= Padua =

City in Veneto, Italy

Padua Padova (Italian) Pàdova / Pàdoa / Pàoa (Venetian)
- Comune
- Città di Padova
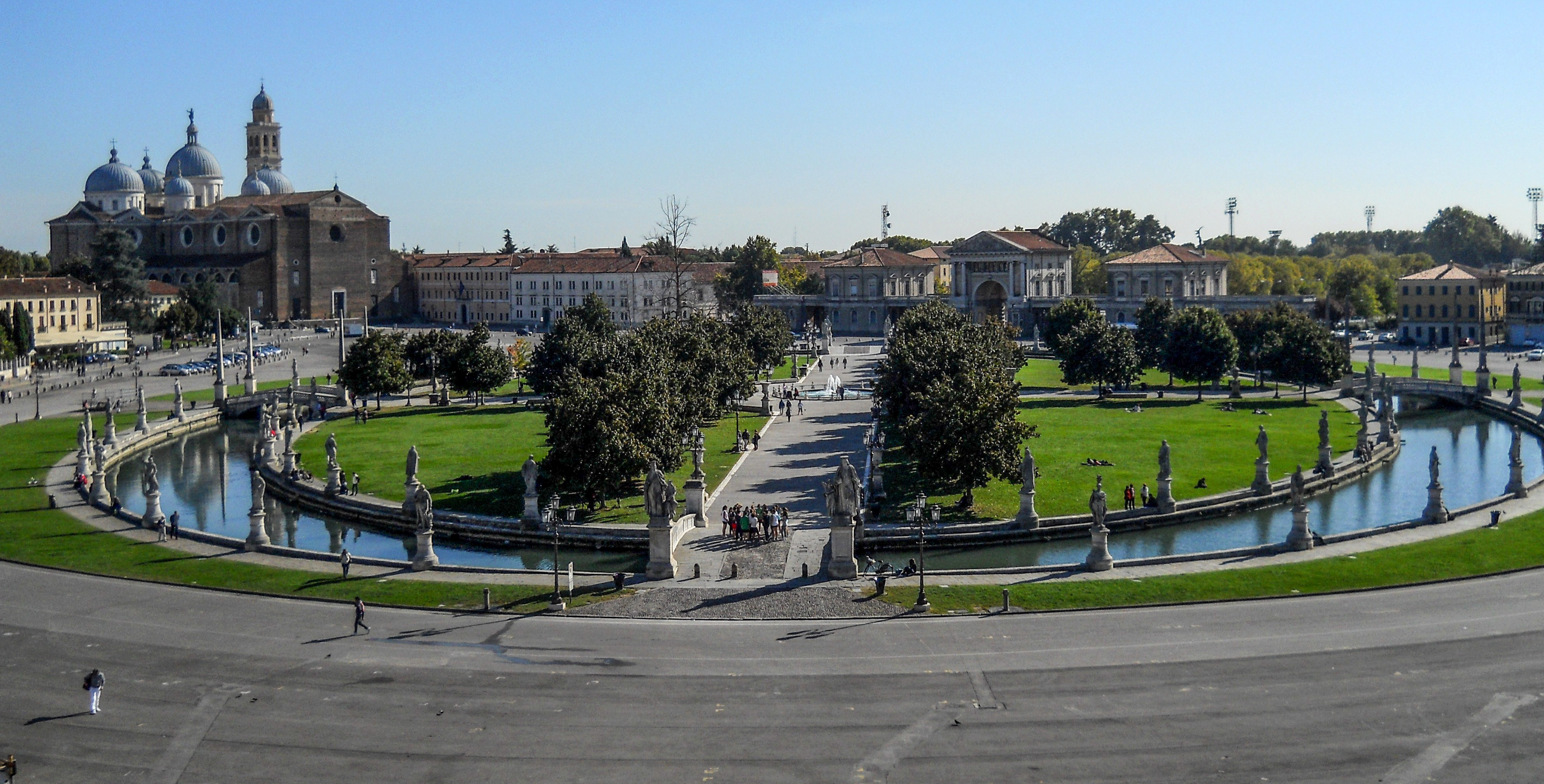
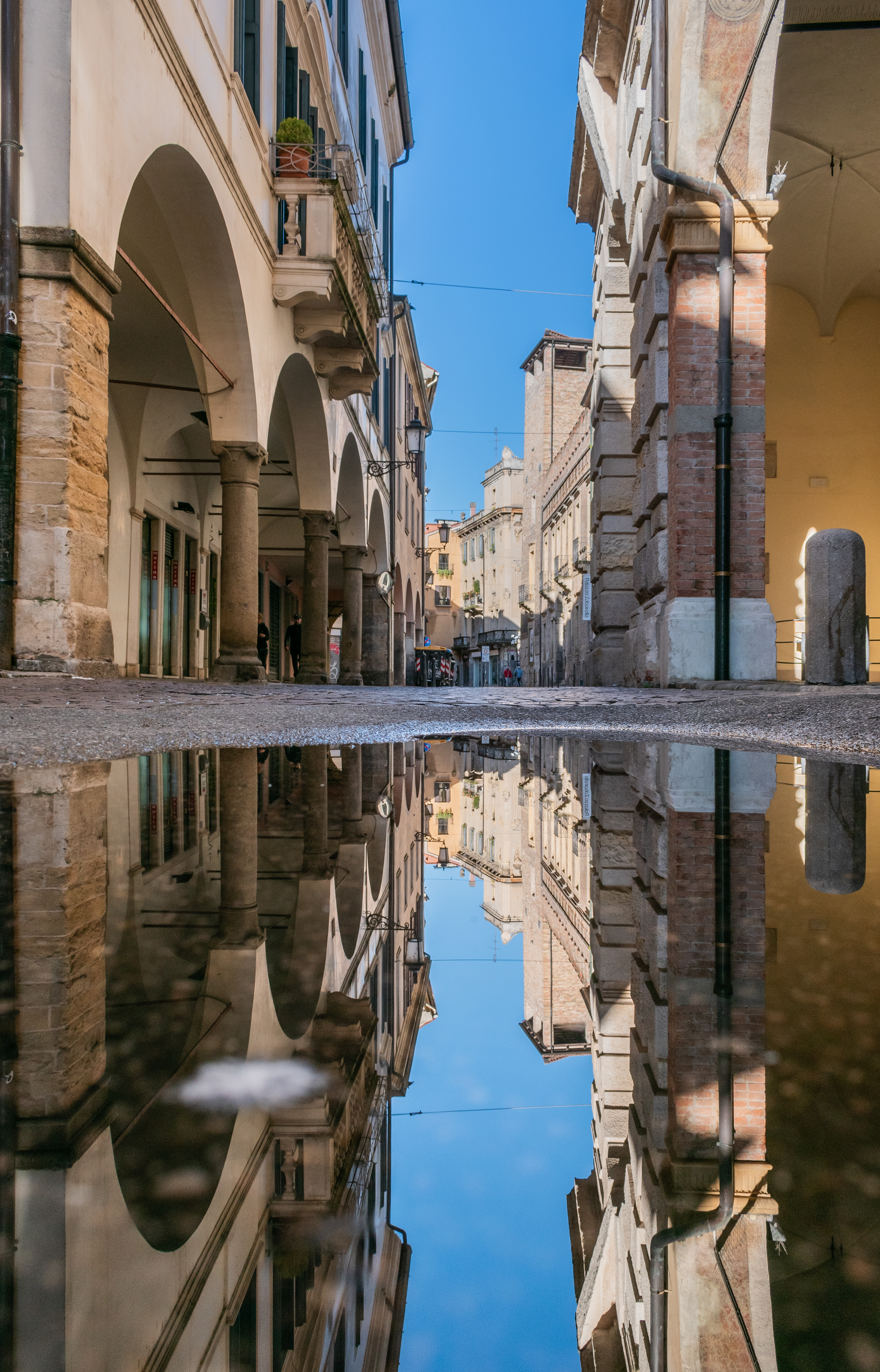
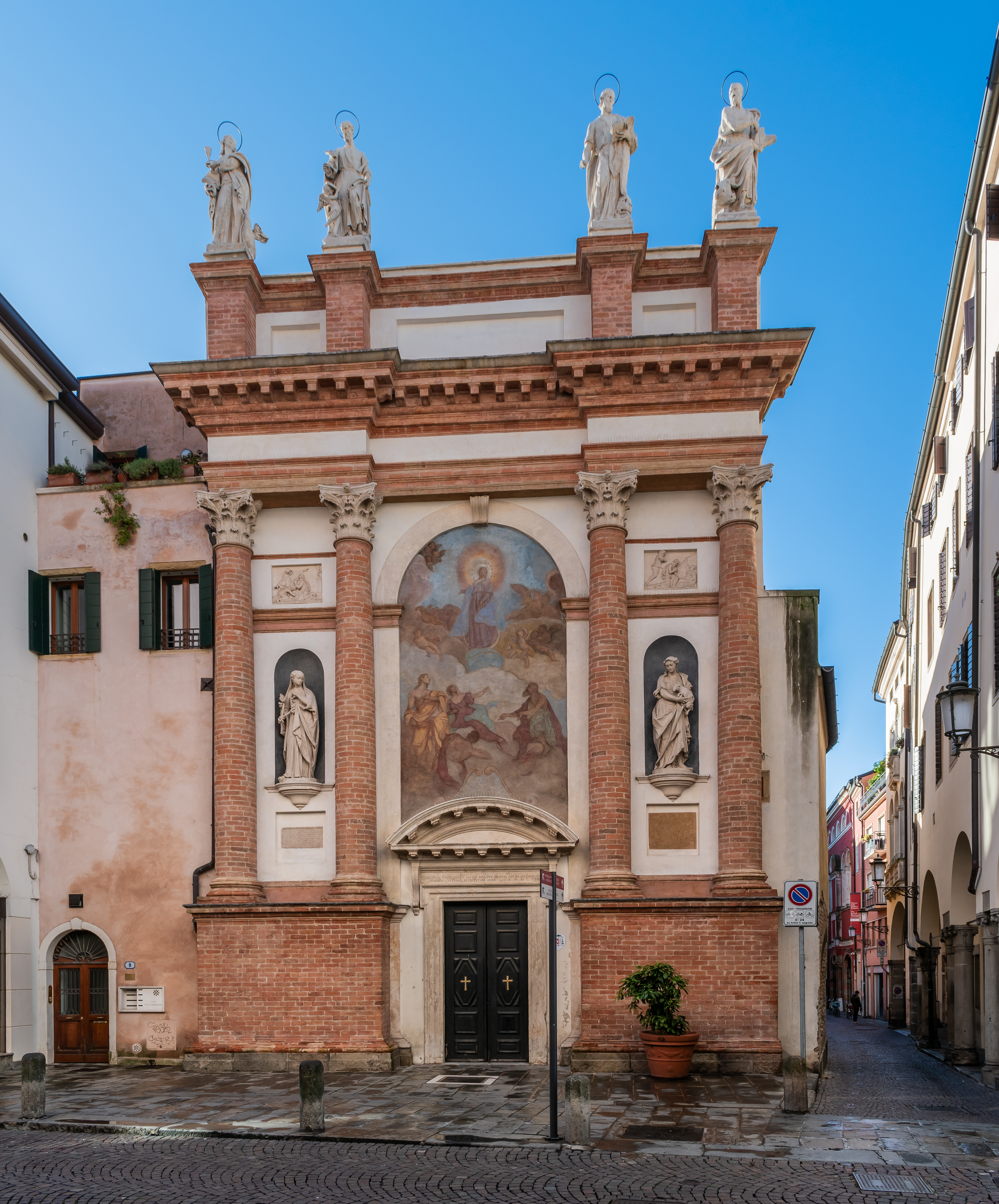
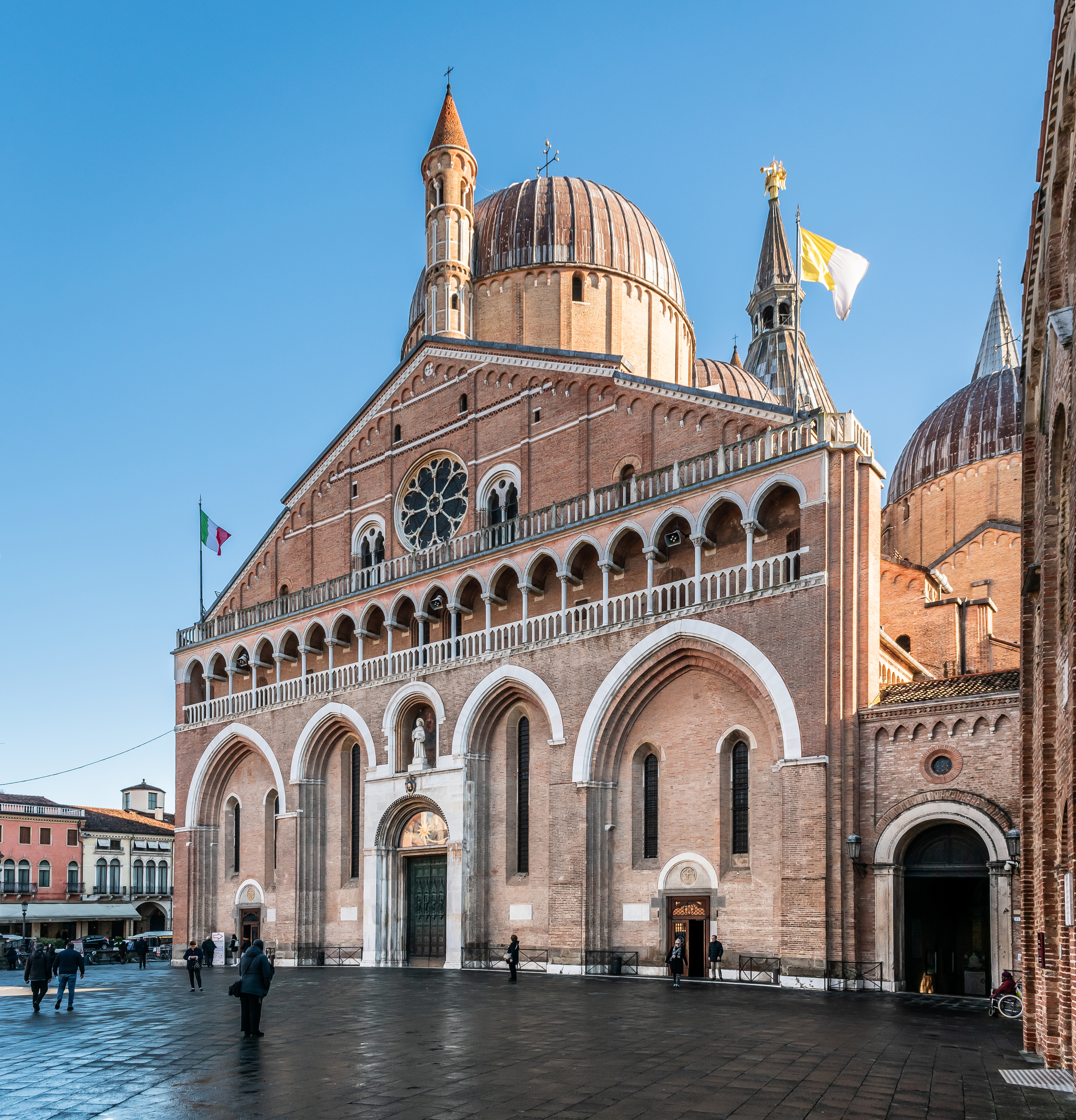
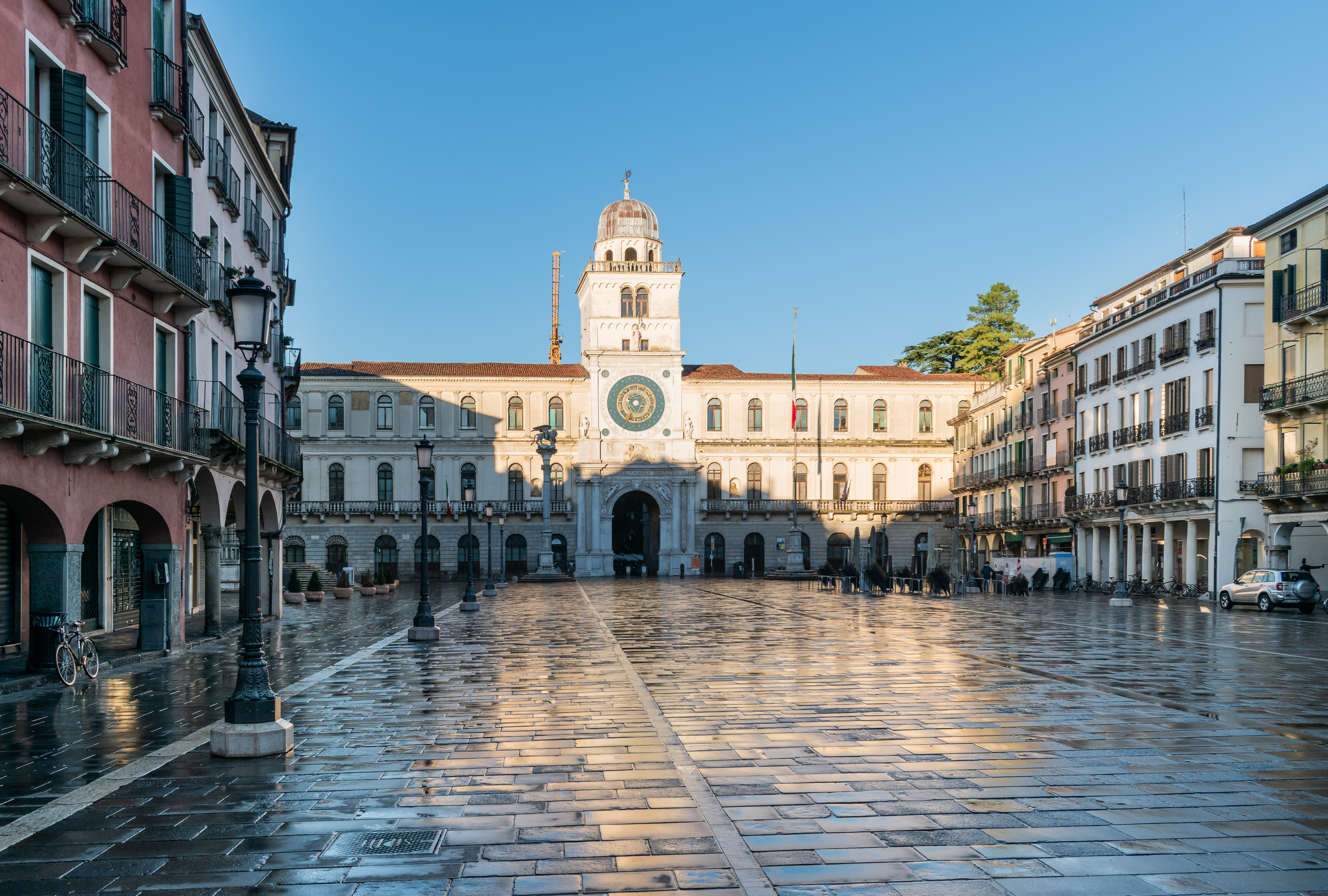
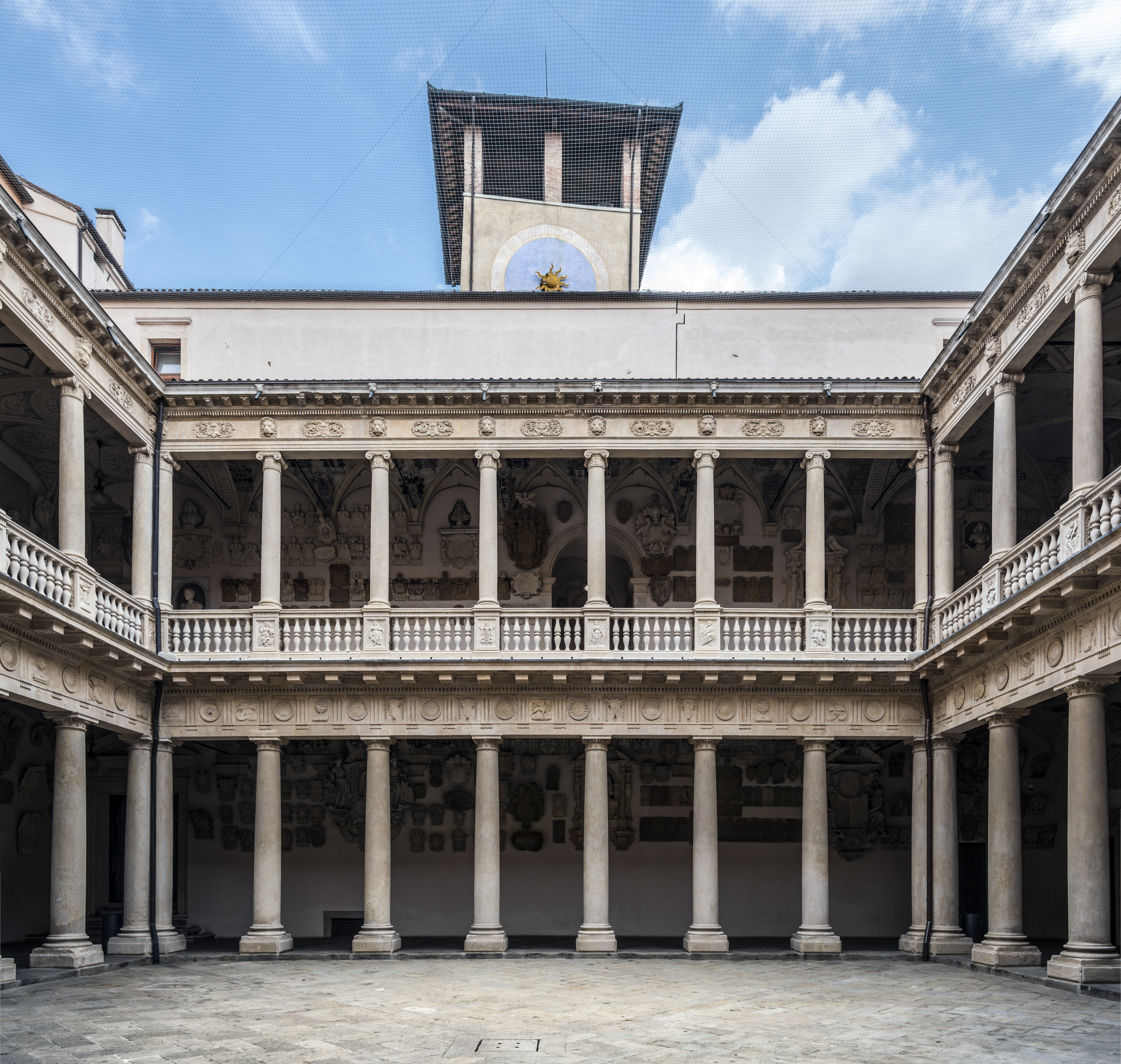
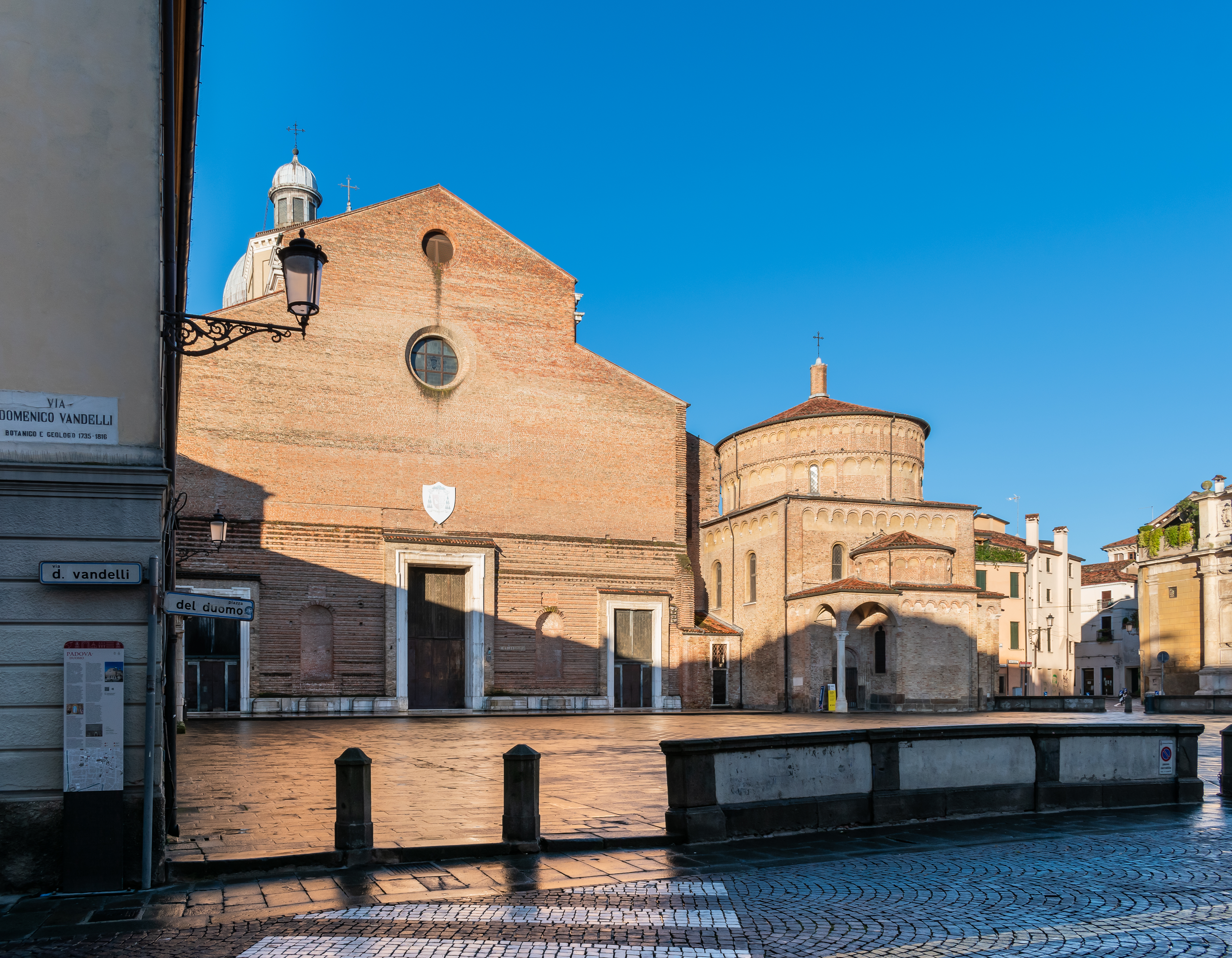
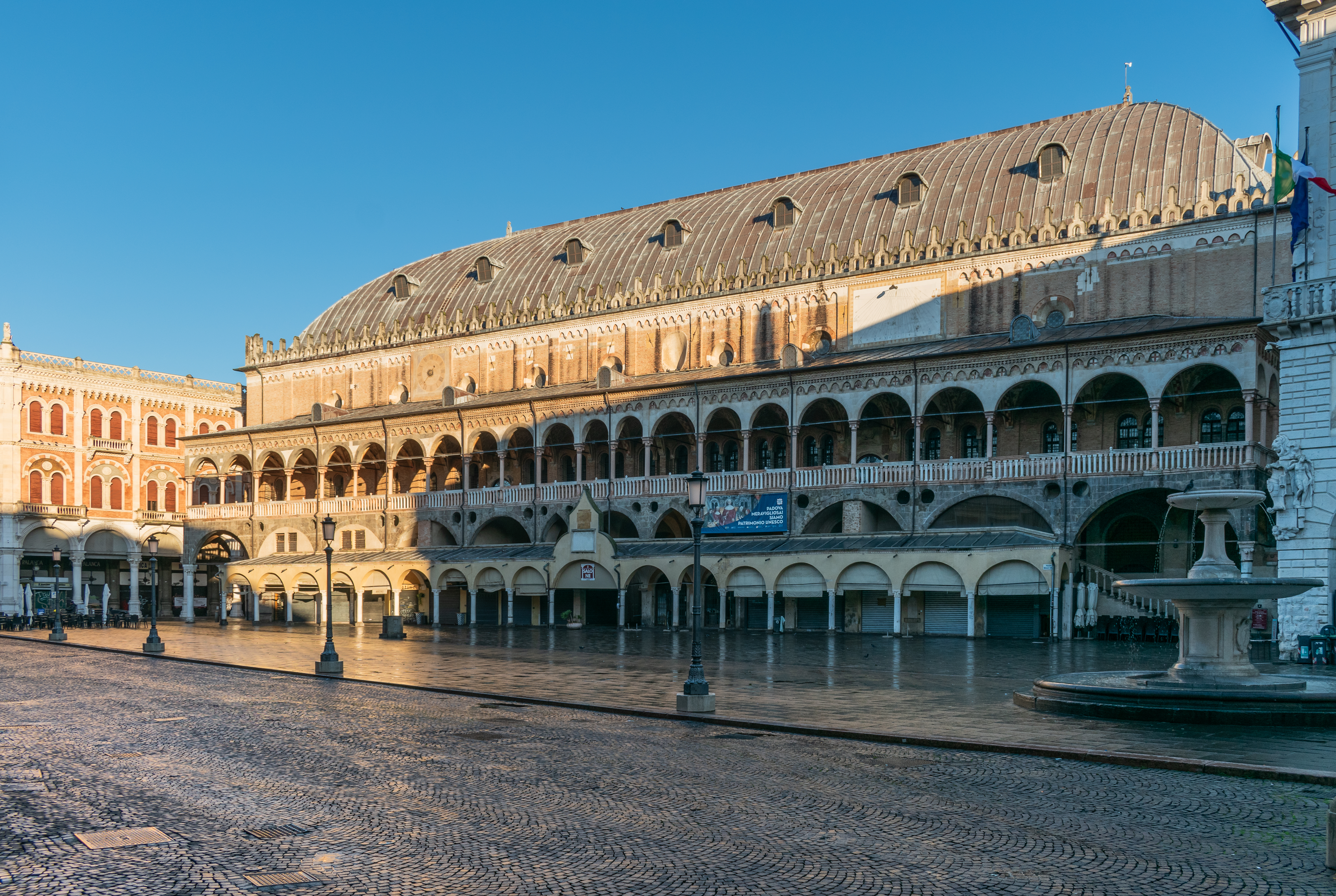
- Prato della Valle Via San Francesco St. Cantianus Church Basilica of Saint Anthony Torre dell'Orologio Bo Palace Padua Cathedral Palazzo della Ragione

- Flag Coat of arms

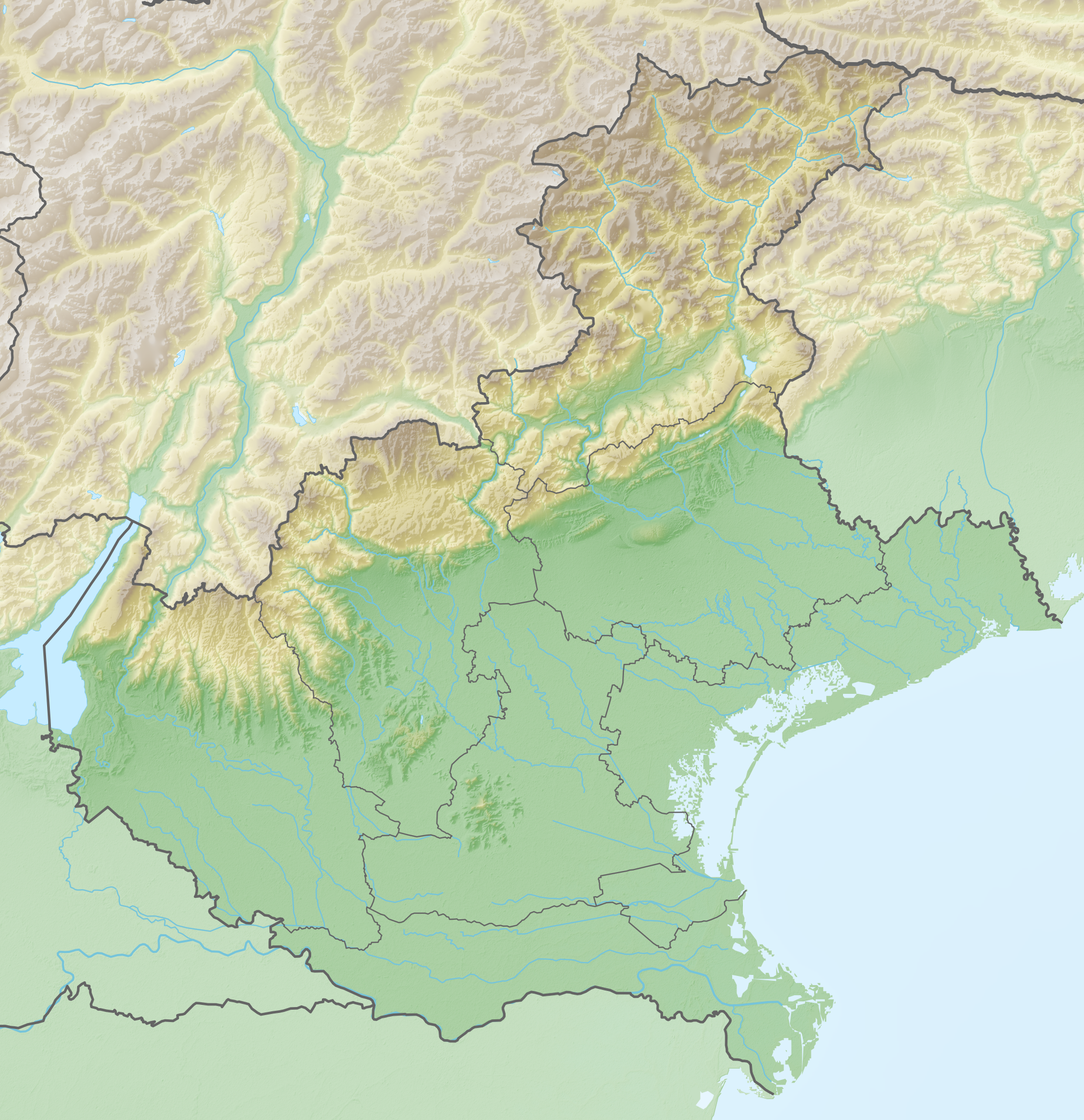
- Location within Italy Location within Veneto
- Coordinates: 45°24′28″N 11°52′24″E
- Country: Italy
- Region: Veneto
- Province: Padua (PD)
- Frazioni: Altichiero, Arcella, Bassanello, Brusegana, Camin, Chiesanuova, Forcellini, Guizza, Mandria, Montà, Mortise, Paltana, Ponte di Brenta, Ponterotto, Pontevigodarzere, Sacra Famiglia, Salboro, Stanga, Terranegra, Volta Brusegana

Government
  - Mayor: Sergio Giordani (PD)

Area
  - Total: 93.03 km^{2} (35.92 sq mi)
- Elevation: 12 m (39 ft)

Population (2026)
  - Total: 208,202
  - Density: 2,238/km^{2} (5,796/sq mi)
- Demonym(s): Padovano; Patavino
- Time zone: UTC+1 (CET)
  - Summer (DST): UTC+2 (CEST)
- Postal code: 35100
- Dialing code: 049
- Patron saint: Saint Anthony of Padua
- Saint day: 13 June
- Website: www.comune.padova.it

Padua (/ˈpædjuə/ PAD-ew-ə; Italian: Padova [ˈpaːdova]; Venetian: Pàdova, Pàdoa or Pàoa) is a city and comune (municipality) in the autonomous region of Veneto in northern Italy, and the capital of the province of Padua. The city lies on the banks of the river Bacchiglione, 40 kilometres (25 miles) west of Venice and 29 km (18 miles) southeast of Vicenza. With a population of 208,202 as of 2026, Padua is the 3rd-largest city in Veneto. It is also the economic and communications hub of the area. Padua is sometimes included, with Venice and Treviso, in the Padua–Treviso–Venice metropolitan area (PATREVE), which has a population of around 2,600,000.

Besides the Bacchiglione, the Brenta River, which once ran through the city, still touches the northern districts. Its agricultural setting is the Venetian Plain. To the city's south west lies the Euganaean Hills, which feature in poems by Lucan, Martial, Petrarch, Ugo Foscolo, and Percy Bysshe Shelley. Padua has two UNESCO World Heritage List entries: its Botanical Garden, which is the world's oldest, and its 14th-century frescoes, situated in buildings in the city centre such as the Scrovegni Chapel.

Padua is home to one of the oldest universities in the world, the University of Padua, founded in 1222, where Galileo Galilei and Nicolaus Copernicus taught or studied. In 1610, Galileo observed the moons of Jupiter through a homemade telescope in Padua, marking the second phase of the Copernican Revolution. Today, the university has around 72,000 students and has a profound impact on the city's recreational, artistic and economic activities.

== Etymology ==
The original significance of the Roman name Patavium (Venetian: Padoa) is uncertain. It may be connected with Padus, the ancient name of the Po river. In addition, the Indo-European root pat- may refer to a wide open plain as opposed to nearby hills; in Latin, this root is present in the word patera ("plate") and the verb patere ("to open"). The suffix -av (also found in names of rivers such as Timavus and Tiliaventum) is likely of Venetic origin, precisely indicating the presence of a river, which in the case of Padua is the Brenta. The ending -ium signifies the presence of villages that have united themselves together. According to another theory, Patavium probably derives from Gaulish padi ("pine"), in reference to the pine forests thereabouts.

== History ==
=== Antiquity ===
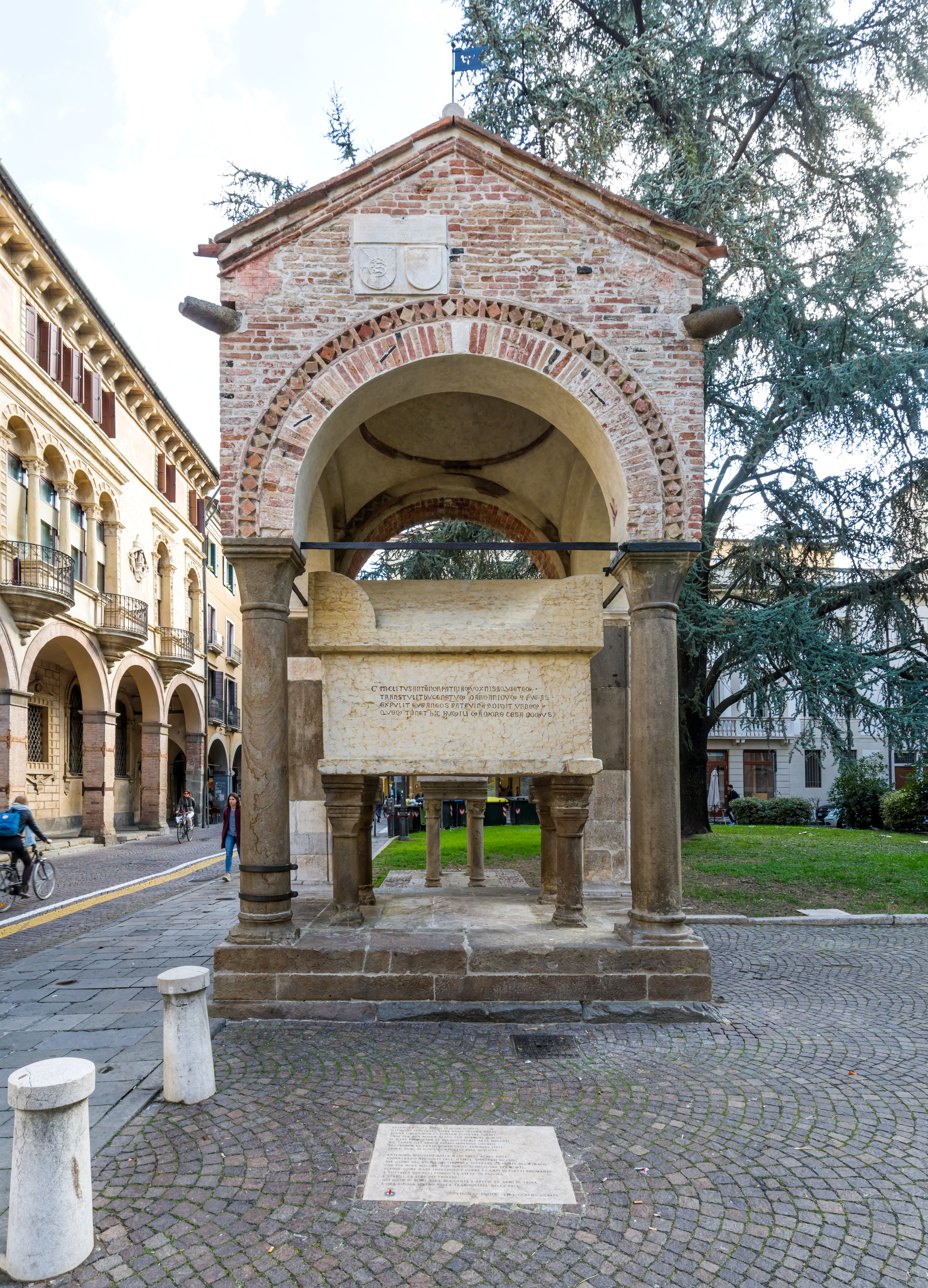
Tomb of Antenor

Padua claims to be among the oldest cities in northern Italy. According to a tradition dated at least to the time of Virgil's Aeneid and to Livy's Ab Urbe Condita, Padua was founded around 1183 BC by the Trojan prince Antenor. After the Fall of Troy, Antenor led a group of Trojans and their Paphlagonian allies, the Eneti or Veneti, who lost their king Pylaemenes to settle the Euganean plain in Italy. Thus, when a large ancient stone sarcophagus was exhumed in the year 1274, officials of the medieval commune declared the remains within to be those of Antenor. An inscription by the native humanist scholar Lovato Lovati placed near the tomb reads:

Inclitus Antenor patriam vox nisa quietem.
Transtulit huc Enetum Dardaniumque fugas,
Expulit Euganeos, Patavinam condidit urbem,
Quem tenet hic humili marmore cesa domus

"This sepulchre excavated from marble
contains the body of the noble Antenor who left his country,
guided the Eneti and Trojans,
banished the Euganeans and founded Padua."

More recent tests suggest the sepulcher dates back to between the 4th and 3rd centuries BC. Nevertheless, archeological remains confirm an early date for the foundation of the center of the town to between the 11th and 10th centuries BC. By the 5th century BC, Padua, rose on the banks of the river Brenta, which in the Roman era was called Medoacus Maior and probably until AD 589 followed the path of the present-day Bacchiglione (Retrone). Padua was one of the principal centers of the Veneti.

The Roman historian Livy records an attempted invasion by the Spartan king Cleonimos around 302 BC. The Spartans came up the river but were defeated by the Veneti in a naval battle and gave up the idea of conquest. Still, later, the Veneti of Padua successfully repulsed invasions by the Etruscans and Gauls. According to Livy and Silius Italicus, the Veneti, including those of Padua, formed an alliance with the Romans by 226 BC against their common enemies, first the Gauls and then the Carthaginians. Men from Padua fought and died beside the Romans at Cannae.

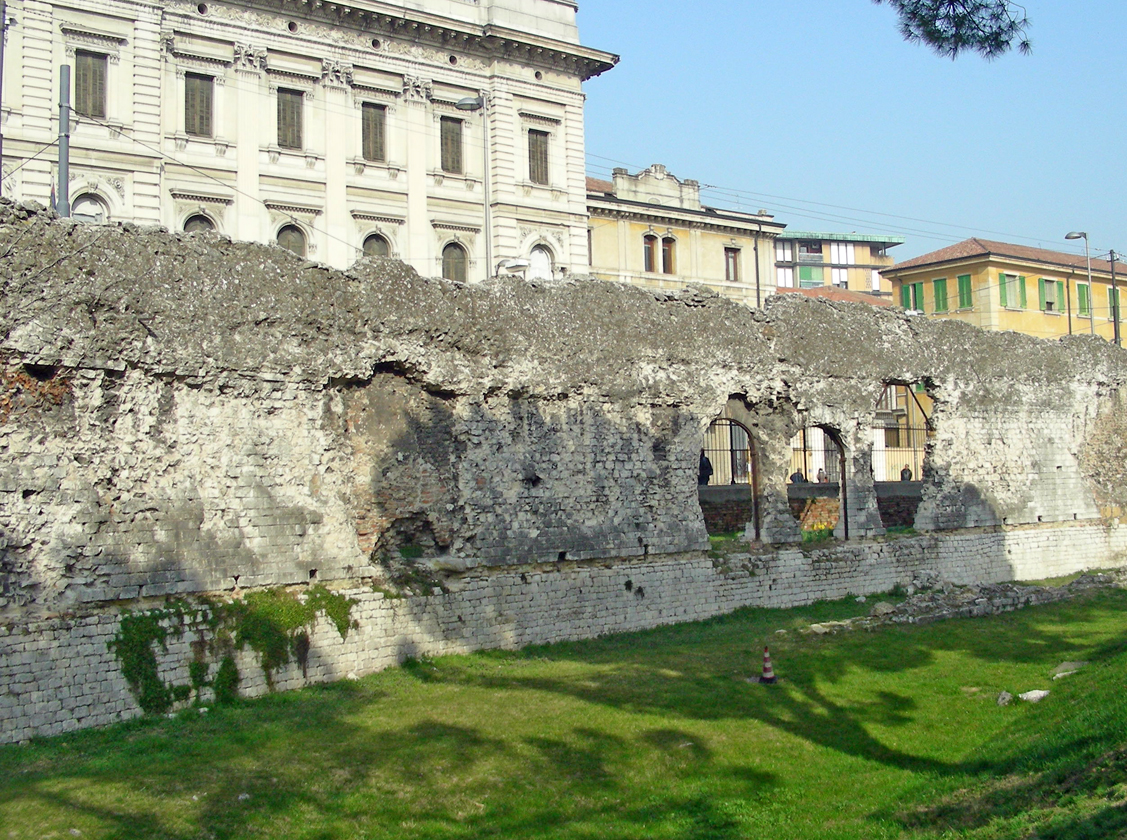
Remnants of Padua's Roman amphitheatre wall

With Rome's northwards expansion, Padua was gradually assimilated into the Roman Republic. In 175 BC, Padua requested the aid of Rome in putting down a local civil war. In 91 BC, Padua, along with other cities of the Veneti, fought with Rome against the rebels in the Social War. Around 49 (or 45 or 43) BC, Padua was made a Roman municipium under the Lex Julia Municipalis and its citizens ascribed to the Roman tribe, Fabia. At that time the population of the city was perhaps 40,000. The city was reputed for its excellent breed of horses and the wool of its sheep. In fact, the poet Martial remarks on the thickness of the tunics made there.

By the end of the first century BC, Padua seems to have been the wealthiest city in Italy outside of Rome. The city became so powerful that it was reportedly able to raise two hundred thousand fighting men. However, despite its wealth, the city was also renowned for its simple manners and strict morality. This concern with morality is reflected in Livy's Roman History (XLIII.13.2) wherein he portrays Rome's rise to dominance as being founded upon her moral rectitude and discipline. Still later, Pliny, referring to one of his Paduan protégés' Paduan grandmother, Sarrana Procula, lauds her as more upright and disciplined than any of her strict fellow citizens (Epist. i.xiv.6). Padua provided the Empire with notable intellectuals. Nearby Abano was the birthplace, and after many years spent in Rome, the death place of Livy, whose Latin was said by the critic Asinius Pollio to betray his Patavinitas (q.v. Quintilian, Inst. Or. viii.i.3). Padua was also the birthplace of Thrasea Paetus, Asconius Pedianus, and perhaps Valerius Flaccus. Christianity was introduced in Padua and in most of the Veneto region by Saint Prosdocimus. He is venerated as the first bishop of the city. His deacon, the Jewish convert Daniel, is also a saintly patron of the city.

=== Late Antiquity ===
The history of Padua during Late Antiquity follows the course of events common to most cities of north-eastern Italy. Padua suffered from the invasion of the Huns and was savagely sacked by Attila in 450. A number of years afterward, it fell under the control of the Gothic kings Odoacer and Theodoric the Great. It was reconquered for a short time by the Byzantine Empire in 540 during the Gothic War. However, depopulation from plague and war ensued. The city was again seized by the Goths under Totila, but was restored to the Eastern Empire by Narses only to fall under the control of the Lombards in 568. During these years, many Paduans sought safety in the countryside and especially in the nearby lagoons of what would become Venice. In 601, the city rose in revolt against Agilulf, the Lombard king who put the city under siege.

After enduring a 12-year-long bloody siege, the Lombards stormed and burned the city. Many ancient artifacts and buildings were seriously damaged. The remains of an amphitheater (the Arena) and some bridge foundations are all that remain of Roman Padua today. The townspeople fled to the hills and later returned to eke out a living among the ruins; the ruling class abandoned the city for the Venetian Lagoon, according to a chronicle. The city did not easily recover from this blow, and Padua was still weak when the Franks succeeded the Lombards as masters of northern Italy.

=== Frankish and Episcopal Supremacy ===
At the Diet of Aix-la-Chapelle (828), the duchy and march of Friuli, in which Padua lay, was divided into four counties, one of which took its title from the city of Padua. The end of the early Middle Ages in Padua was marked by the sack of the city by the Magyars in 899. It was many years after Padua recovered from this ravage. During the period of episcopal supremacy over the cities of northern Italy, Padua does not appear to have been either very important or very active. The general tendency of its policy throughout the war of investitures was Imperial (Ghibelline) and not Roman (Guelph); and its bishops were, for the most part, of Germanic extraction.

=== Emergence of the Commune ===
Under the surface, several important movements were taking place that were to prove formative for the later development of Padua. At the beginning of the 11th century, the citizens established a constitution, composed of a general council or legislative assembly and a credenza or executive body. During the next century, they were engaged in wars with Venice and Vicenza for the right of water-way on the Bacchiglione and the Brenta. The city grew in power and self-confidence and in 1138, the government was entrusted to two consuls.

The great families of Camposampiero, Este and Da Romano began to emerge and to divide the Paduan district among themselves. The citizens, in order to protect their liberties, were obliged to elect a podestà in 1178. Their choice first fell on one of the Este family. A fire devastated Padua in 1174. This required the virtual rebuilding of the city.

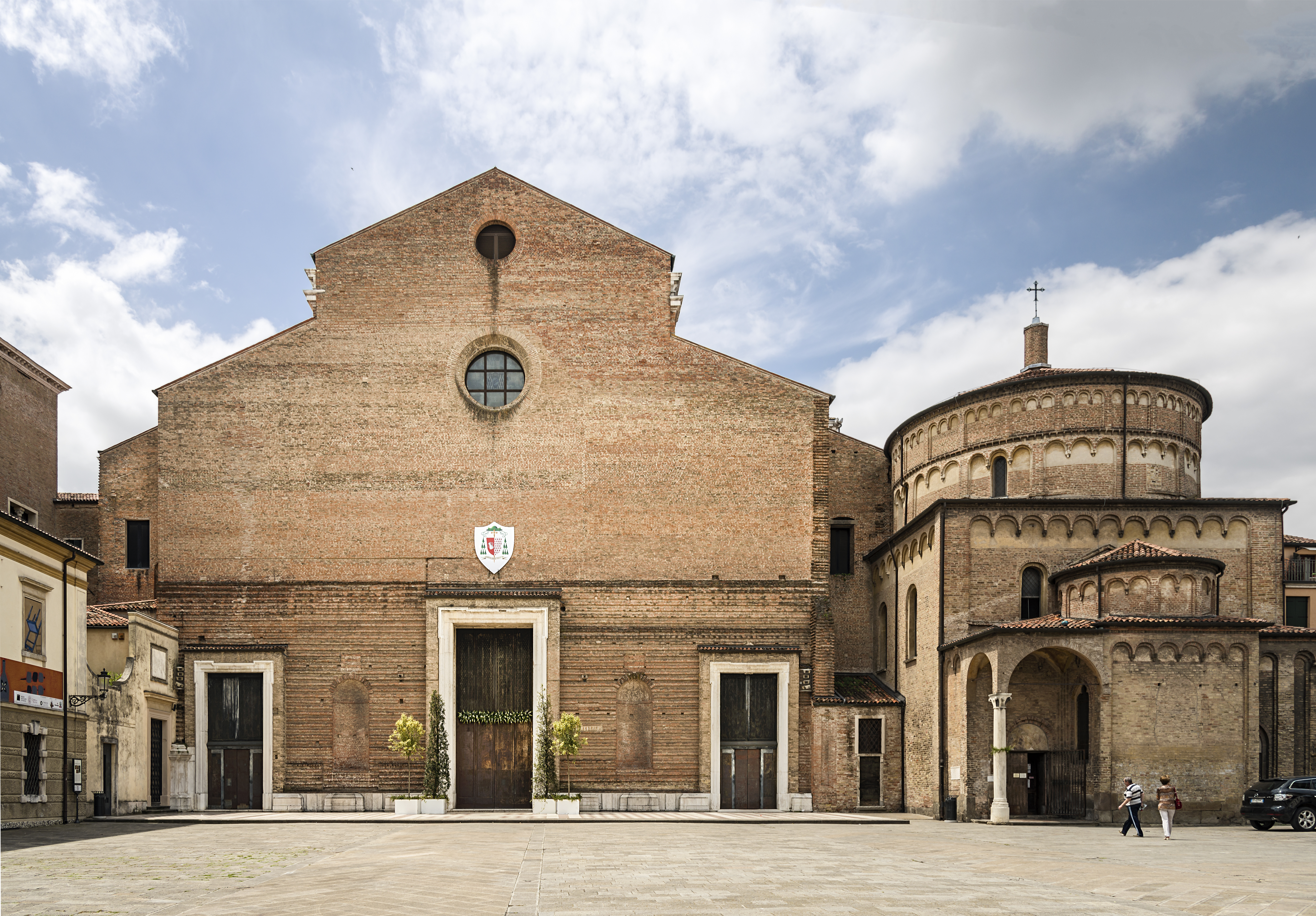
The unfinished façade of Padua Cathedral

The temporary success of the Lombard League helped to strengthen the towns. However, their civic jealousy soon reduced them to weakness again. In 1214–1216, Padua was involved in a conflict with Venice, which it lost. In 1236 Frederick II found little difficulty in establishing his vicar Ezzelino III da Romano in Padua and the neighbouring cities, where he practised frightful cruelties on the inhabitants. Ezzelino was unseated in June 1256 without civilian bloodshed, thanks to Pope Alexander IV.

Padua then enjoyed a period of calm and prosperity: the basilica of the saint was begun; and the Paduans became masters of Vicenza. The University of Padua (the second university in Italy, after Bologna) was founded in 1222, and as it flourished in the 13th century, Padua outpaced Bologna, where no effort had been made to expand the revival of classical precedents beyond the field of jurisprudence, to become a center of early humanist researches, with first-hand knowledge of Roman poets that was unrivalled in Italy or beyond the Alps. The advances of Padua in the 13th century finally brought the commune into conflict with Can Grande della Scala, lord of Verona. In 1311 Padua had to yield to the Scaligeri of Verona.

=== Emergence of the Signoria ===
Jacopo da Carrara was elected lord (signore) of Padua in 1318, at that point the city was home to 40,000 people. From then till 1405, nine members of the Carraresi family, including Ubertino, Jacopo II, and Francesco il Vecchio, succeeded one another as lords of the city, with the exception of a brief period of Scaligeri overlordship between 1328 and 1337 and two years (1388–1390) when Giangaleazzo Visconti held the town. The period of the signoria is covered down to 1358 in the chronicle of Guglielmo Cortusi.

The Carraresi period was a long period of restlessness, for the Carraresi were constantly at war. Under Carraresi rule the early humanist circles in the university were effectively disbanded: Albertino Mussato, the first modern poet laureate, died in exile at Chioggia in 1329, and the eventual heir of the Paduan tradition was the Tuscan Petrarch. In 1387, John Hawkwood won the Battle of Castagnaro for Padua, against Giovanni Ordelaffi, for Verona. The Carraresi period finally came to an end as the power of the Visconti and of Venice grew in importance.

=== Venetian rule ===
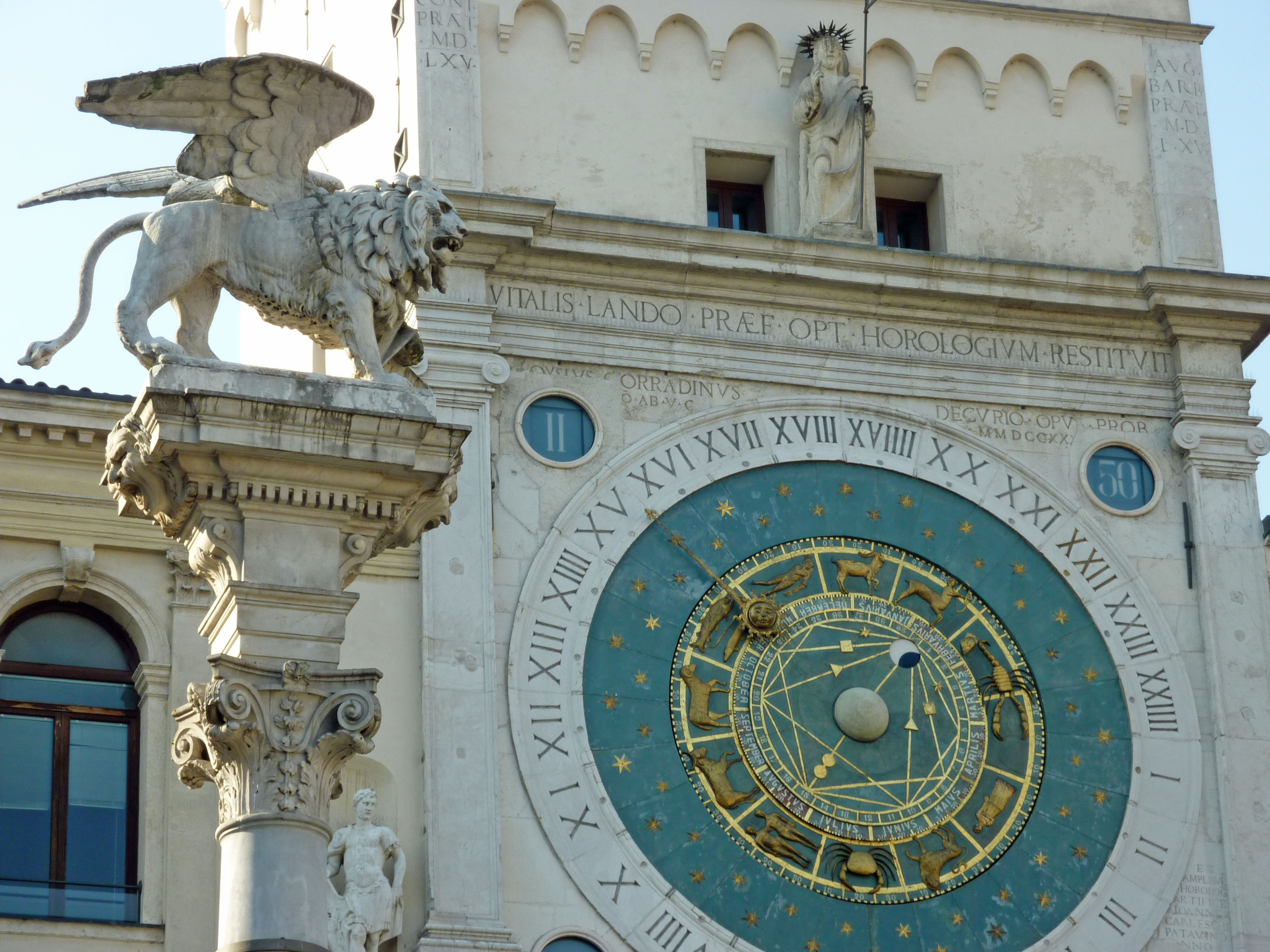
Clock tower and Lion of St. Mark, symbol of the 'Most Serene Republic'

Padua came under the rule of the Republic of Venice in 1405, and mostly remained that way until the fall of the republic in 1797. There was just a brief period when the city changed hands (in 1509) during the wars of the League of Cambrai. On 10 December 1508, representatives of the Papacy, France, the Holy Roman Empire, and Ferdinand V of Castile concluded the League of Cambrai against the Republic. The agreement provided for the complete dismemberment of Venice's territory in Italy and for its partition among the signatories: Holy Roman Emperor Maximilian I of the House of Habsburg was to receive Padua in addition to Verona and other territories. In 1509 Padua was held for just a few weeks by Imperial supporters. Venetian troops quickly recovered it and successfully defended Padua during its siege by Imperial troops.

The city was governed by two Venetian nobles, a podestà for civil affairs and a captain for military affairs. Both of them were elected for sixteen months. Under these governors, the great and small councils continued to discharge municipal business and to administer the Paduan law, contained in the statutes of 1276 and 1362. The treasury was managed by two chamberlains; and every five years the Paduans sent one of their nobles to reside as nuncio in Venice, and to watch the interests of his native town. Venice fortified Padua with new walls, built between 1507 and 1544, with a series of monumental gates.

=== Austrian rule ===
In 1797 the Venetian Republic came to an end with the Treaty of Campo Formio, and Padua, like much of the Veneto region, was ceded to the Habsburgs. In 1806 the city passed to the French puppet Kingdom of Italy until the fall of Napoleon, in 1814, when the city became part of the newly formed Kingdom of Lombardy–Venetia, part of the Austrian Empire. Austrian rule was unpopular with progressive circles in northern Italy, but the feelings of the population (from the lower to the upper classes) towards the empire were mixed.

In Padua, the year of revolutions of 1848 saw a student revolt which on 8 February turned the University and the Caffè Pedrocchi into battlegrounds in which students and ordinary Paduans fought side by side. The revolt was short-lived, and there were no other episodes of unrest under the Austrian Empire (nor previously had there been any), as in Venice or in other parts of Italy; while opponents of Austria were forced into exile. Under Austrian rule, Padua began its industrial development; one of the first Italian rail tracks, Padua-Venice, was built in 1845. In 1866 the Battle of Königgrätz gave Italy the opportunity, as an ally of Prussia, to take Veneto, and Padua was also annexed to the recently formed Kingdom of Italy.

=== Italian rule ===
Annexed to Italy during 1866, Padua was at the centre of the poorest area of Northern Italy, as Veneto was until the 1960s. Despite this, the city flourished in the following decades both economically and socially, developing its industry, being an important agricultural market and having a very important cultural and technological centre like the University. The city hosted also a major military command and many regiments.

=== 20th century ===
When Italy entered World War I on 24 May 1915, Padua was chosen as the main command of the Italian Army. The king and the commander in chief, respectively Vittorio Emanuele III and Luigi Cadorna, went to live in Padua for the period of the war. After the defeat of Italy in the battle of Caporetto in autumn 1917, the front line was situated on the river Piave. This was just 50–60 km (31–37 mi) from Padua, and the city was now in range of the Austrian artillery. However, the Italian military command did not withdraw. The city was bombed several times (about 100 civilian deaths). A memorable feat was Gabriele D'Annunzio's flight to Vienna from the nearby San Pelagio Castle air field. A year later, the threat to Padua was removed. In late October 1918, the Italian Army won the decisive Battle of Vittorio Veneto, and the Austrian forces collapsed. The armistice was signed at Villa Giusti, Padua, on 3 November 1918.

During the war, the industry grew rapidly, and this provided Padua with a base for further post-war development. In the years immediately following World War I, Padua developed outside the historical town, enlarging and growing in population, even if labor and social strife were rampant at the time. As in many other areas in Italy, Padua experienced great social turmoil in the years immediately following World War I. The city was shaken by strikes and clashes, factories and fields were subject to occupation, and war veterans struggled to re-enter civilian life. Many supported fascism as a new political way. As in other parts of Italy, the National Fascist Party in Padua soon came to be seen as the defender of property and order against revolution. The city was also the site of one of the largest fascist mass rallies, with some 300,000 people reportedly attending one speech by the Italian fascist leader Benito Mussolini. New buildings, in typical fascist architecture, sprang up in the city. Examples can be found today in the buildings surrounding Piazza Spalato (today Piazza Insurrezione), the railway station, the new part of City Hall, and part of the Bo Palace hosting the University.

Following Italy's defeat in the Second World War on 8 September 1943, Padua became part of the Italian Social Republic, a puppet state of the Nazi occupiers. The city hosted the Ministry of Public Instruction of the new state, as well as military and militia commands and a military airport. The Resistenza, the Italian partisans, was very active against both the new fascist rule and the Nazis. One of the main leaders of the Resistenza in the area was the University vice-chancellor, Concetto Marchesi. From December 1943 to the end of the war, Padua was bombed 24 times by Allied aircraft; the heaviest raids were the ones on 16 and 30 December 1943 (each of which caused 300 victims), 7 February 1944 (300 victims), 11 March 1944 (over 300 tons of bombs dropped by 111 bombers), 22 and 23 March 1944, 20 April 1944 (180 victims), 22 February and 12 March 1945. The worst-hit areas were the railway station (the target of most raids) and the northern district of Arcella, where 96% of all buildings were destroyed; overall, 950 homes were destroyed and 1,400 damaged. During one of these bombings, the Church of the Eremitani, with frescoes by Andrea Mantegna, was destroyed, considered by some art historians to be Italy's biggest wartime cultural loss. The Cathedral and the University also suffered damage. Some 2,000 inhabitants of Padua were killed by the raids.

On 26 April 1945, the partisans started the final insurrection against the Germans and Fascists; in the subsequent fighting, 224 partisans and 497 Germans were killed. 5,000 German troops, including three generals, surrendered to the partisans in Padua, and another 10,000 in the surrounding area; on 28 April New Zealand troops (2nd New Zealand Division) of the British Eighth Army entered the city. A small Commonwealth War Cemetery is located in the west part of the city, commemorating the sacrifice of these troops. After the war, the city developed rapidly, reflecting Veneto's rise from being the poorest region in northern Italy to one of the richest and most economically active regions of modern Italy.

== Geography ==
=== Climate ===
Padua experiences a humid subtropical climate (Köppen climate classification Cfa) characteristic of northern Italy, modified by the nearby Adriatic Sea.

Climate data for Padua (2000–2016 normals, extremes 1946–1990)
Month	Jan	Feb	Mar	Apr	May	Jun	Jul	Aug	Sep	Oct	Nov	Dec	Year
Record high °C (°F)	17.2 (63.0)	22.9 (73.2)	24.8 (76.6)	29.4 (84.9)	32.5 (90.5)	35.0 (95.0)	38.2 (100.8)	37.2 (99.0)	34.0 (93.2)	29.0 (84.2)	21.9 (71.4)	16.8 (62.2)	38.2 (100.8)
Mean daily maximum °C (°F)	7.3 (45.1)	9.6 (49.3)	14.5 (58.1)	19.1 (66.4)	24.0 (75.2)	27.9 (82.2)	30.2 (86.4)	29.9 (85.8)	24.8 (76.6)	18.7 (65.7)	12.8 (55.0)	8.1 (46.6)	18.9 (66.0)
Daily mean °C (°F)	3.9 (39.0)	5.4 (41.7)	9.7 (49.5)	14.0 (57.2)	18.7 (65.7)	22.7 (72.9)	24.7 (76.5)	24.0 (75.2)	19.4 (66.9)	14.5 (58.1)	9.5 (49.1)	4.8 (40.6)	14.3 (57.7)
Mean daily minimum °C (°F)	1.5 (34.7)	2.3 (36.1)	5.8 (42.4)	9.7 (49.5)	14.1 (57.4)	18.0 (64.4)	19.9 (67.8)	19.4 (66.9)	15.5 (59.9)	11.4 (52.5)	7.0 (44.6)	2.2 (36.0)	10.6 (51.0)
Record low °C (°F)	−19.2 (−2.6)	−15.4 (4.3)	−8.2 (17.2)	−1.8 (28.8)	0.8 (33.4)	4.5 (40.1)	6.5 (43.7)	8.6 (47.5)	5.2 (41.4)	−1.6 (29.1)	−6.9 (19.6)	−10.0 (14.0)	−19.2 (−2.6)
Average precipitation mm (inches)	57.7 (2.27)	76.6 (3.02)	81.6 (3.21)	83.8 (3.30)	101.9 (4.01)	80.0 (3.15)	72.6 (2.86)	77.5 (3.05)	92.1 (3.63)	94.3 (3.71)	108.7 (4.28)	60.6 (2.39)	987.4 (38.88)
Average precipitation days (≥ 1.0 mm)	6	6	7	9	9	7	6	7	6	8	8	6	85
Average relative humidity (%)	82	76	72	71	69	67	65	69	73	81	84	82	74
Mean monthly sunshine hours	68.2	107.4	142.6	162.0	207.7	246.0	297.6	279.0	186.0	127.1	81.0	46.5	1,951.1
Source 1: ARPA Veneto
Source 2: Servizio Meteorologico (sun 1961–1990)

== Demographics ==
Historical population
Year	Pop.	±%
1871	64,862	—
1881	70,753	+9.1%
1901	81,242	+14.8%
1911	96,118	+18.3%
1921	108,912	+13.3%
1931	126,843	+16.5%
1936	138,709	+9.4%
1951	167,672	+20.9%
1961	197,680	+17.9%
1971	231,599	+17.2%
1981	234,678	+1.3%
1991	215,137	−8.3%
2001	204,870	−4.8%
2011	206,192	+0.6%
2021	206,651	+0.2%
Source: ISTAT

As of 2026, the population is 208,202, of which 48.4% are males, and 51.6% are females. Minors make up 13.1% of the population, and seniors make up 27.0%.

=== Immigration ===
As of 2025, immigrants make up 19.6% of the population. The 5 largest foreign countries of birth are Romania, Moldova, Bangladesh, China, and Morocco.

Foreign-born population (2025)
Country of birth	Population
Romania	5,896
Moldova	5,487
Bangladesh	2,228
China	2,221
Morocco	2,214
Albania	2,014
Nigeria	2,005
Philippines	1,488
Pakistan	1,159
Ukraine	1,142
Iran	1,133
Sri Lanka	845
Brazil	652
India	624
Tunisia	606

== Government ==
Since local government political reorganization in 1993, Padua has been governed by the City Council of Padua. Voters elect directly 33 councilors and the mayor of Padua every five years. The incumbent mayor of Padua is Sergio Giordani (an independent politician supported by the Democratic Party and the centre-left coalition), elected on 26 June 2017. While Veneto has traditionally been Italy's most conservative region, Padua as a university city has had somewhat left-wing leanings. In the 1970s, leftist groups like Potere Operaio and Autonomia Operaia were strong in the city. Since the mayors of Padua became directly elected in 1995 (as in all other Italian cities above 15,000 inhabitants since 1993), only two right-leaning mayors have been elected: Giustina Destro in 1999 and Massimo Bitonci in 2014.

Mayor	Term start	Term end	Party
Gastone Costa	1946	1947	PSI
Cesare Crescente	1947	1970	DC
Ettore Bentsik	1970	1977	DC
Luigi Merlin	1977	1980	DC
Ettore Bentsik	1980	1981	DC
Guido Montesi	1981	1982	DC
Settimo Gottardo	1982	1987	DC
Paolo Giaretta	1987	1993	DC
Flavio Zanonato	1993	1995	PDS
Flavio Zanonato	8 May 1995	27 June 1999	PDS
Giustina Destro	27 June 1999	27 June 2004	FI
Flavio Zanonato	27 June 2004	10 June 2013	PD
Ivo Rossi (acting)	10 June 2013	9 June 2014	PD
Massimo Bitonci	9 June 2014	12 November 2016	LN
Michele Penta*; Paolo De Biagi*	12 November 2016	26 June 2017	
Sergio Giordani	26 June 2017	Incumbent	PD

* Special prefectural commissioners, nominated after the majority of the members of the City Council resigned in order to remove the mayor from the office.

== Sights ==
Padua's fourteenth-century fresco cycles
UNESCO World Heritage Site
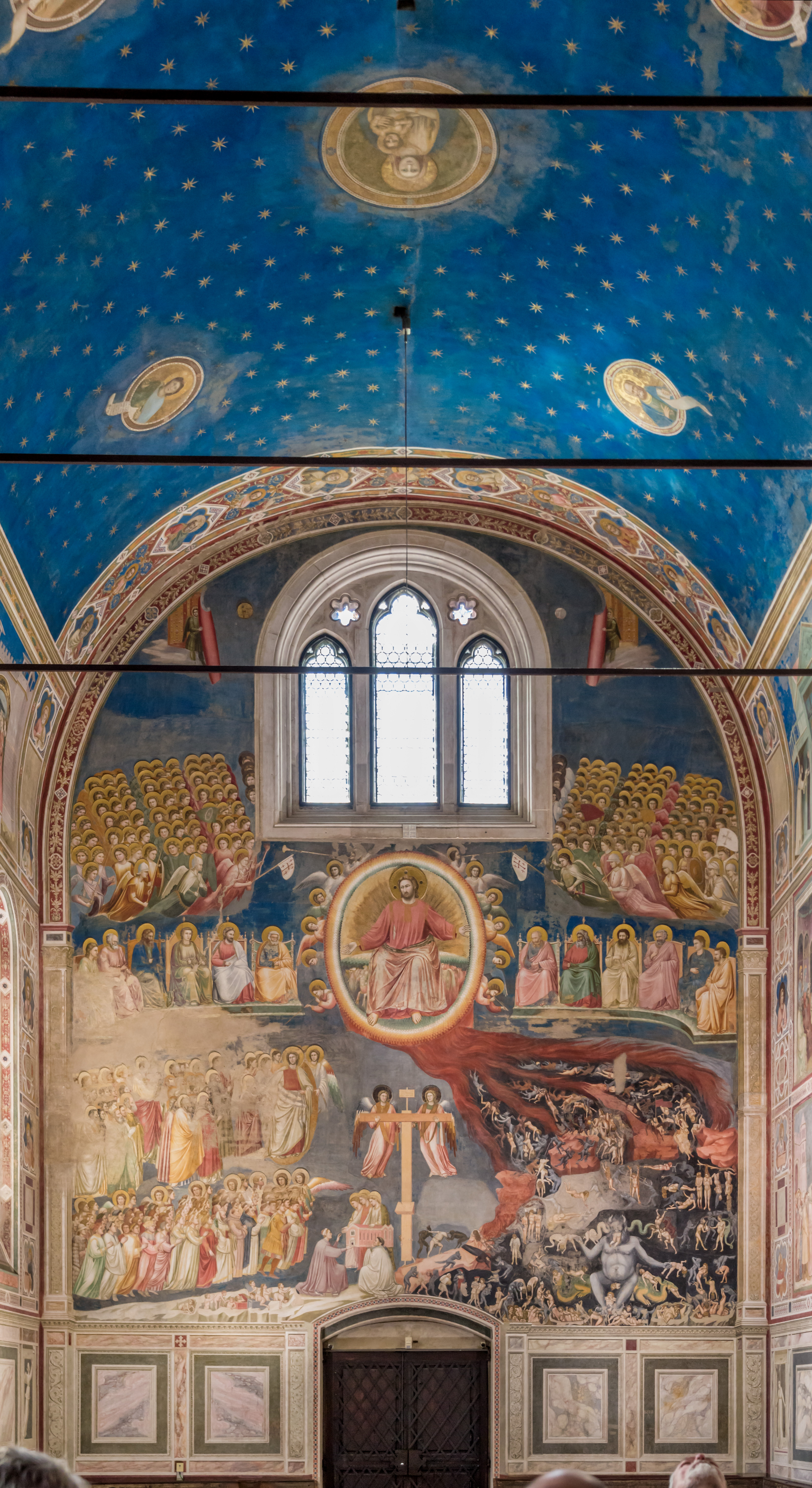
- Last Judgment by Giotto (1305), Scrovegni Chapel
- Interactive map of Padua's fourteenth-century fresco cycles
- Criteria: Cultural: (ii), (iii)
- Reference: 1623
- Inscription: 2021 (44th Session)
- Website: www.cappelladegliscrovegni.it/index.php/en/
- Coordinates: 45°24′05″N 11°52′51″E

- The Scrovegni Chapel (Italian: Cappella degli Scrovegni) is Padua's most notable sight. It houses a cycle of frescoes completed in 1305 by Giotto. It was commissioned by Enrico degli Scrovegni, a wealthy banker, as a private chapel once attached to his family's palazzo. It is also called the "Arena Chapel" because it stands on the site of a Roman-era arena. The fresco cycle details the life of the Virgin Mary and has been acknowledged by many to be one of the most important fresco cycles in the world for its role in the development of European painting. It also includes one of the earliest representations of a kiss in the history of art (Meeting at the Golden Gate, 1305). Entrance to the chapel is an elaborate ordeal, as it involves spending 15 minutes prior to entrance in a climate-controlled, airlocked vault, used to stabilize the temperature between the outside world and the inside of the chapel. This is intended to protect the frescoes from moisture and mold.
- The Palazzo della Ragione, with its great hall on the upper floor, is reputed to have the largest roof unsupported by columns in Europe; the hall is nearly rectangular, its length 81.5 m (267.39 ft), its breadth 27 m (88.58 ft), and its height 24 m (78.74 ft); the walls are covered with allegorical frescoes; the building stands upon arches, and the upper storey is surrounded by an open loggia, not unlike that which surrounds the basilica of Vicenza. The Palazzo was begun in 1172 and finished in 1219. In 1306, Fra Giovanni, an Augustinian friar, covered the whole with one roof. Originally there were three roofs, spanning the three chambers into which the hall was at first divided; the internal partition walls remained till the fire of 1420, when the Venetian architects who undertook the restoration removed them, throwing all three spaces into one and forming the present great hall, the Salone. The new space was refrescoed by Nicolo' Miretto and Stefano da Ferrara, working from 1425 to 1440. Beneath the great hall, there is a centuries-old market.
  - The City Hall, called Palazzo Moroni, is attached to the Palazzo della Ragione. Its facade is covered by the names of the Paduan dead in the different wars of Italy.
- In the Piazza dei Signori is the loggia called the Gran Guardia, (1493–1526), and close by is the Palazzo del Capitanio, the residence of the Venetian governors, with its great door, the work of Giovanni Maria Falconetto, the Veronese architect-sculptor who introduced Renaissance architecture to Padua and who completed the door in 1532. Falconetto was the architect of Alvise Cornaro's garden loggia, (Loggia Cornaro), the first fully Renaissance building in Padua.
  - Nearby stands Padua Cathedral, remodelled in 1552 after a design of Michelangelo. It contains works by Nicolò Semitecolo, Francesco Bassano and Giorgio Schiavone.
  - The Baptistry to its right, consecrated in 1281, houses the most important frescoes cycle by Giusto de' Menabuoi.
- The most celebrated of the Paduan churches is the Basilica di Sant'Antonio da Padova, locally known as "Il Santo". The bones of the saint rest in a chapel richly ornamented with carved marble, the work of various artists, among them Sansovino and Falconetto. The basilica was begun around the year 1230 and completed in the following century. Tradition says that the building was designed by Nicola Pisano. It is covered by seven cupolas, two of them pyramidal. There are also four cloisters. The belltower has eight bells in C.
  - Donatello's equestrian statue of Gattamelata, the Venetian general Erasmo da Narni, can be found on the piazza in front of the Basilica of Saint Anthony. It was cast in 1453, and was the first full-size equestrian bronze cast since antiquity. It was inspired by the Marcus Aurelius equestrian sculpture at the Capitoline Hill in Rome.
  - To the right of the Basilica of Saint Anthony there is the Oratory of St George (13th century), with frescoes by Altichiero, and the Scuola di S. Antonio (16th century), with frescoes by Tiziano (Titian).
- One of the best known symbols of Padua is the Prato della Valle, a 90,000 m^{2} (968,751.94 sq ft) elliptical square. This is one of the biggest in Europe. In the centre is a wide garden surrounded by an oval canal, lined by 78 statues portraying illustrious citizens. It was created by Andrea Memmo in the late 18th century. Memmo once resided in the monumental 15th-century Palazzo Angeli, which now houses the Museum of Precinema.
  - Abbey of Santa Giustina and adjacent Basilica at the Prato della Valle. The complex was founded in the 5th century on the tomb of the namesake saint, Justine of Padua. In the 15th century, it became one of the most important monasteries in the area, until it was suppressed by Napoleon in 1810. In 1919, it was reopened. The tombs of several saints are housed in the interior, including those of Justine, St. Prosdocimus, St. Maximus, St. Urius, St. Felicita, St. Julianus, as well as relics of the Apostle St. Matthias and the Evangelist St. Luke. This is home to some art, including the Martyrdom of St. Justine by Paolo Veronese. The belltower has eight bells in B.
- The Church of the Eremitani is an Augustinian church of the 13th century, containing the tombs of Jacopo (1324) and Ubertinello (1345) da Carrara, lords of Padua, and the chapel of SS James and Christopher, formerly illustrated by Mantegna's frescoes. This was largely destroyed by the Allies in World War II, because it was next to the Nazi headquarters. The old monastery of the church now houses the Musei Civici di Padova (town archeologic and art museum).
- Santa Sofia Church is probably Padova's most ancient church. The crypt was begun in the late 10th century by Venetian craftsmen. It has a basilica plan with Romanesque-Gothic interior and Byzantine elements. The apse was built in the 12th century. The edifice appears to be tilting slightly due to the soft terrain.
- The church of San Gaetano (1574–1586) was designed by Vincenzo Scamozzi, on an unusual octagonal plan. The interior, decorated with polychrome marbles, houses a Madonna and Child by Andrea Briosco, in Nanto stone.
- The 16th-century, Baroque Padua Synagogue
- At the centre of the historical city, the buildings of Palazzo del Bò, the centre of the University of Padua
- The Teatro Verdi is host to performances of operas, musicals, plays, ballets, and concerts.
- The Caffé Pedrocchi, built in 1831 by architect Giuseppe Jappelli in neoclassical style with Egyptian influence. This café has been open for almost two centuries. It hosts the Risorgimento museum, and the near building of the Pedrocchino ("little Pedrocchi") in neogothic style.
- The city centre is surrounded by the 11 km-long (6.8 mi) city walls, built during the early 16th century, by architects that include Michele Sanmicheli. There are only a few ruins left, together with two gates, of the smaller and inner 13th-century walls. There is also a castle, the Castello. Its main tower was transformed between 1767 and 1777 into an astronomical observatory known as Specola. However the other buildings were used as prisons during the 19th and 20th centuries. They are now being restored.
- The Ponte San Lorenzo, a Roman bridge largely underground, along with the ancient Ponte Molino, Ponte Altinate, Ponte Corvo, and Ponte San Matteo.

=== Villas ===
In the community of Padua are numerous noble villas. These include:

- Villa Contarini, at Piazzola sul Brenta, built in 1546 by Palladio and enlarged in the following centuries.
- Villa Loredan, at Sant'Urbano
- Villa Molin, in the Mandria fraction, designed by Vincenzo Scamozzi in 1597
- Villa Mandriola (17th century), at Albignasego
- Villa Pacchierotti-Trieste (17th century), at Limena
- Villa Selvatico da Porto (15th–18th century), at Vigonza
- Villa Cittadella-Vigodarzere (19th century), at Saonara

=== Churches ===
Padua's historic core includes numerous churches of significant architectural and artistic value. These include (most already mentioned above):

- Sant'Andrea – founded in the 12th century
- Basilica of Saint Anthony of Padua – built in 1235.
- Basilica Cathedral of the Assumption of St. Mary – the most recent structure, the fourth on this site, was built in 1551.
- Baptistry (adjacent to the Cathedral) – consecrated in 1281
- Santa Caterina d'Alessandria – documented since the 13th century.
- San Clemente – built in 1190.
- Santa Croce – built in 1737.
- San Daniele – completed in 1076.
- Church of the Eremitani – built in 1276.
- San Francesco – consecrated in 1430.
- San Gaetano Church – built between 1574 and 1576.
- Oratory of St George – built between 1376 and 1377.
- Abbey Church of Santa Giustina – the original structure was built in 520 and expanded in 1050.
- Santa Maria dei Servi – dedicated in 1511.
- Scrovegni Chapel – consecrated in 1305.
- Church of Saint Sofia – dating from the 10th century.

=== Gallery ===
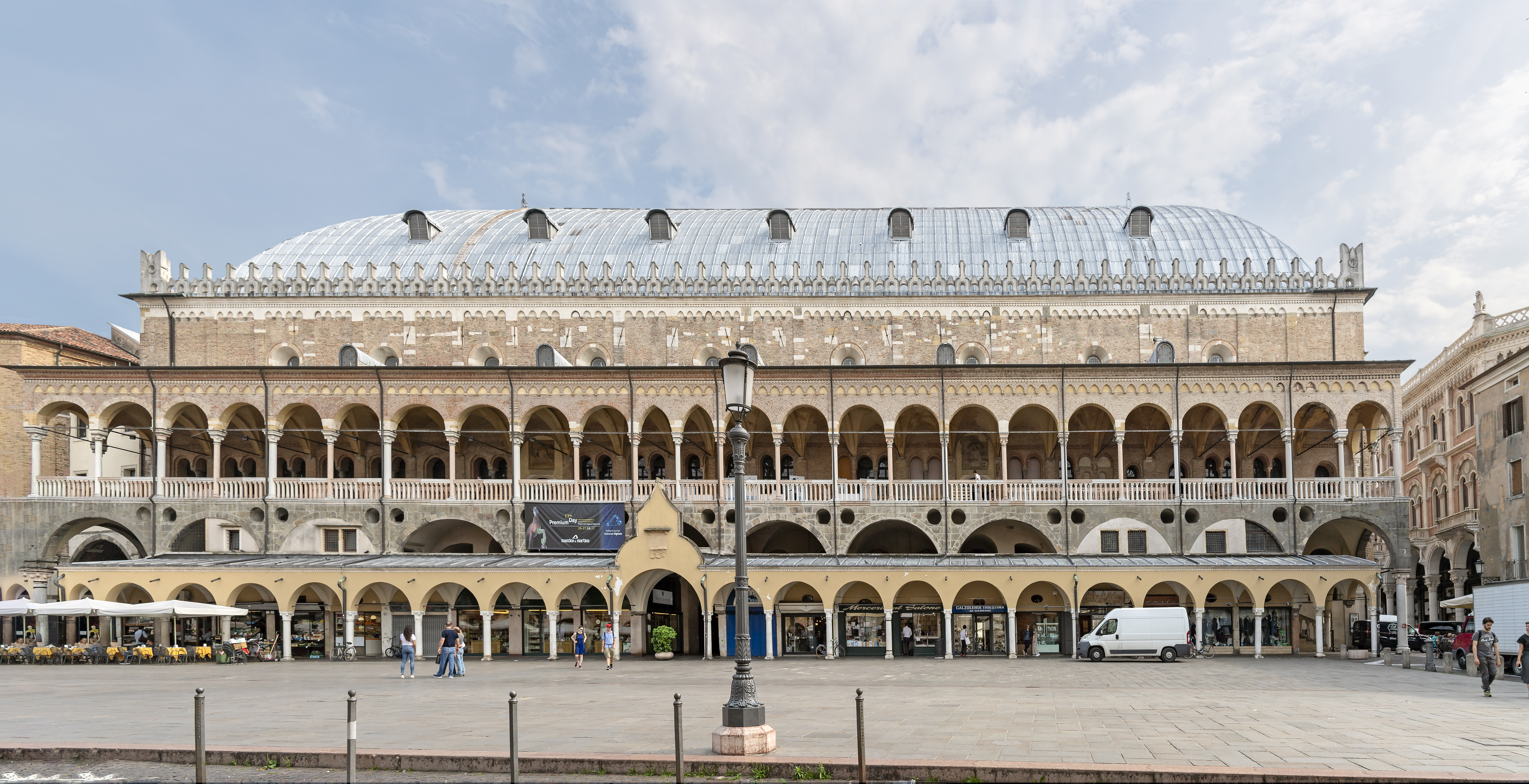
Palazzo della Ragione

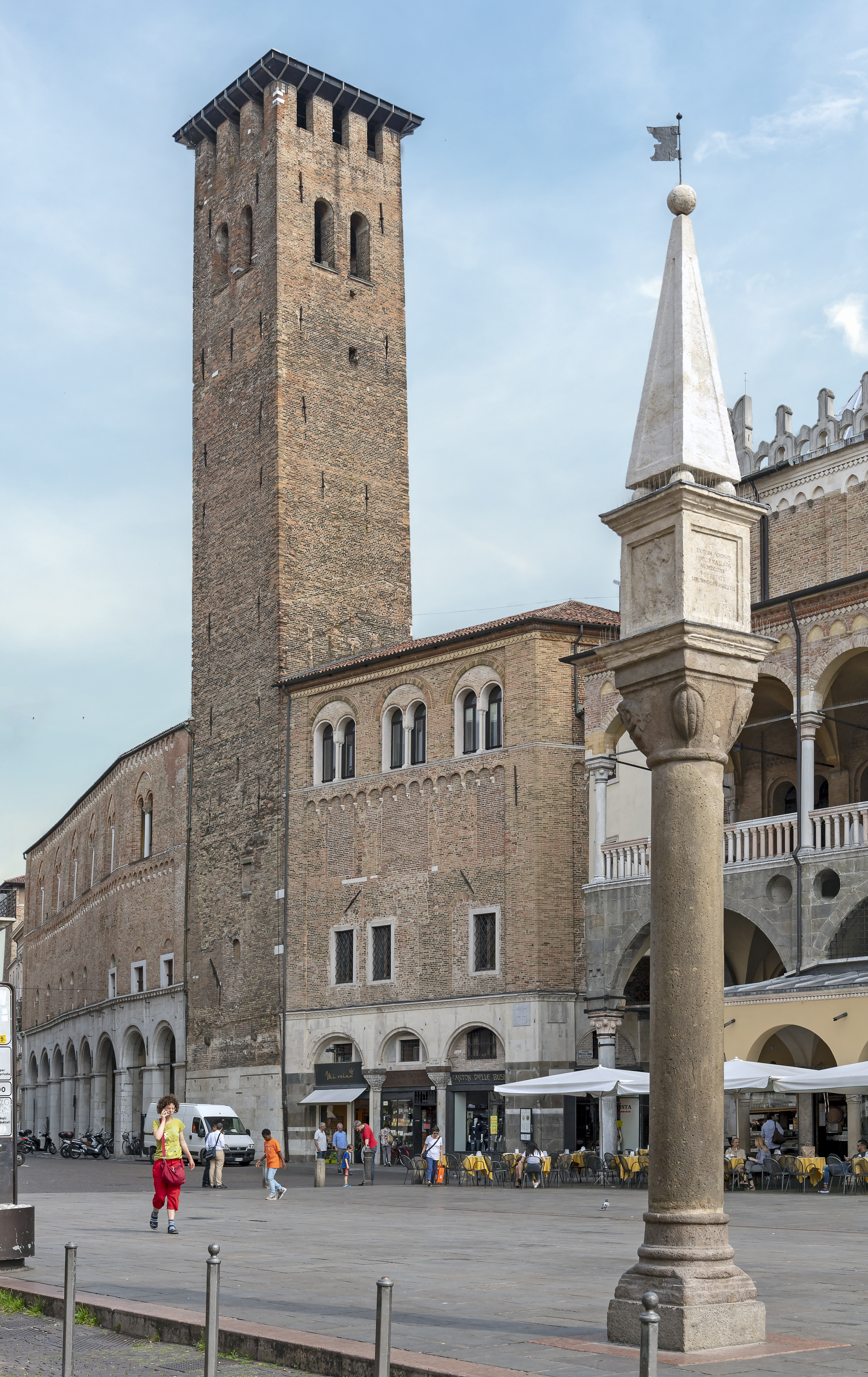
Torre degli Anziani, as seen from Piazza della Frutta

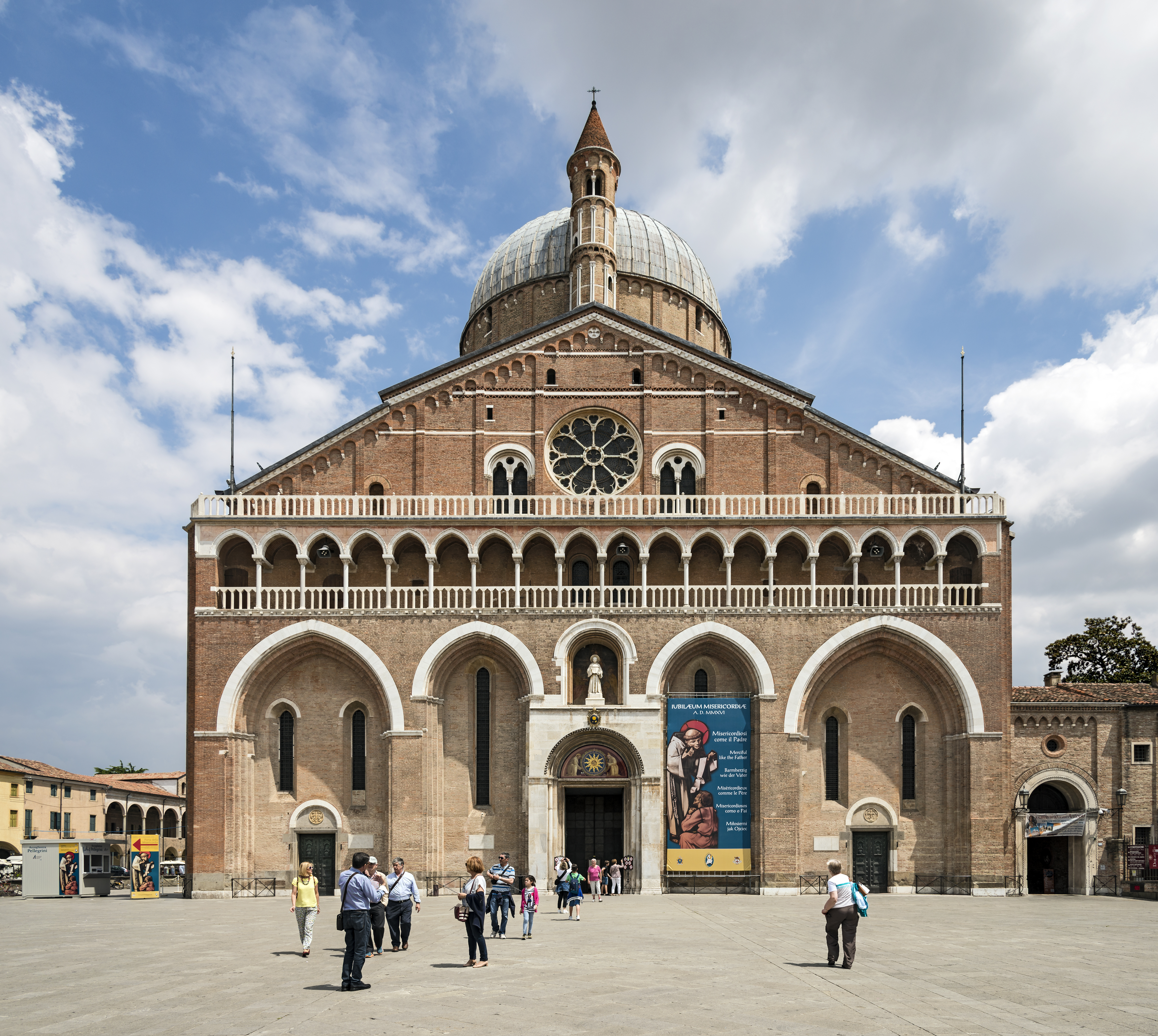
The Basilica of Saint Anthony of Padua

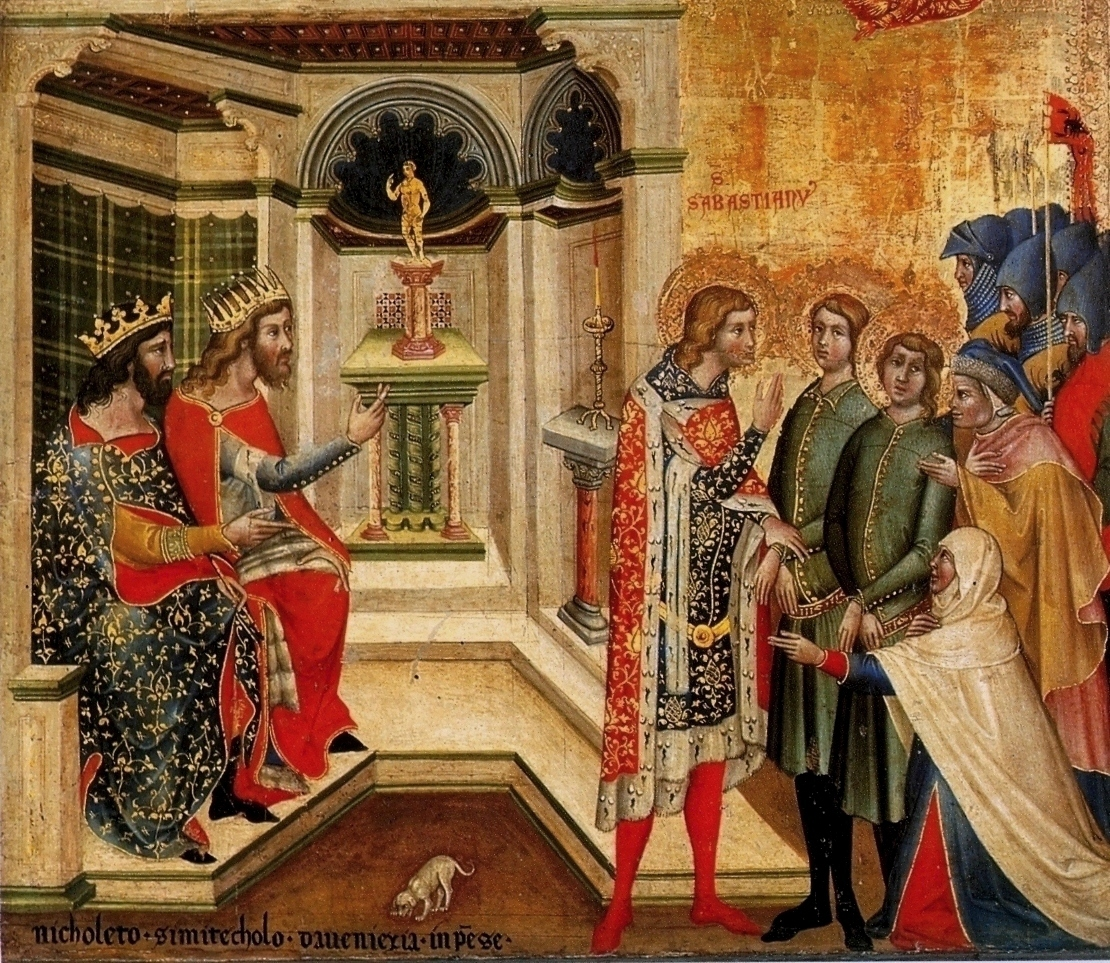
This tempera, Two Christians before the Judges, hangs in the sacristy of Padua Cathedral

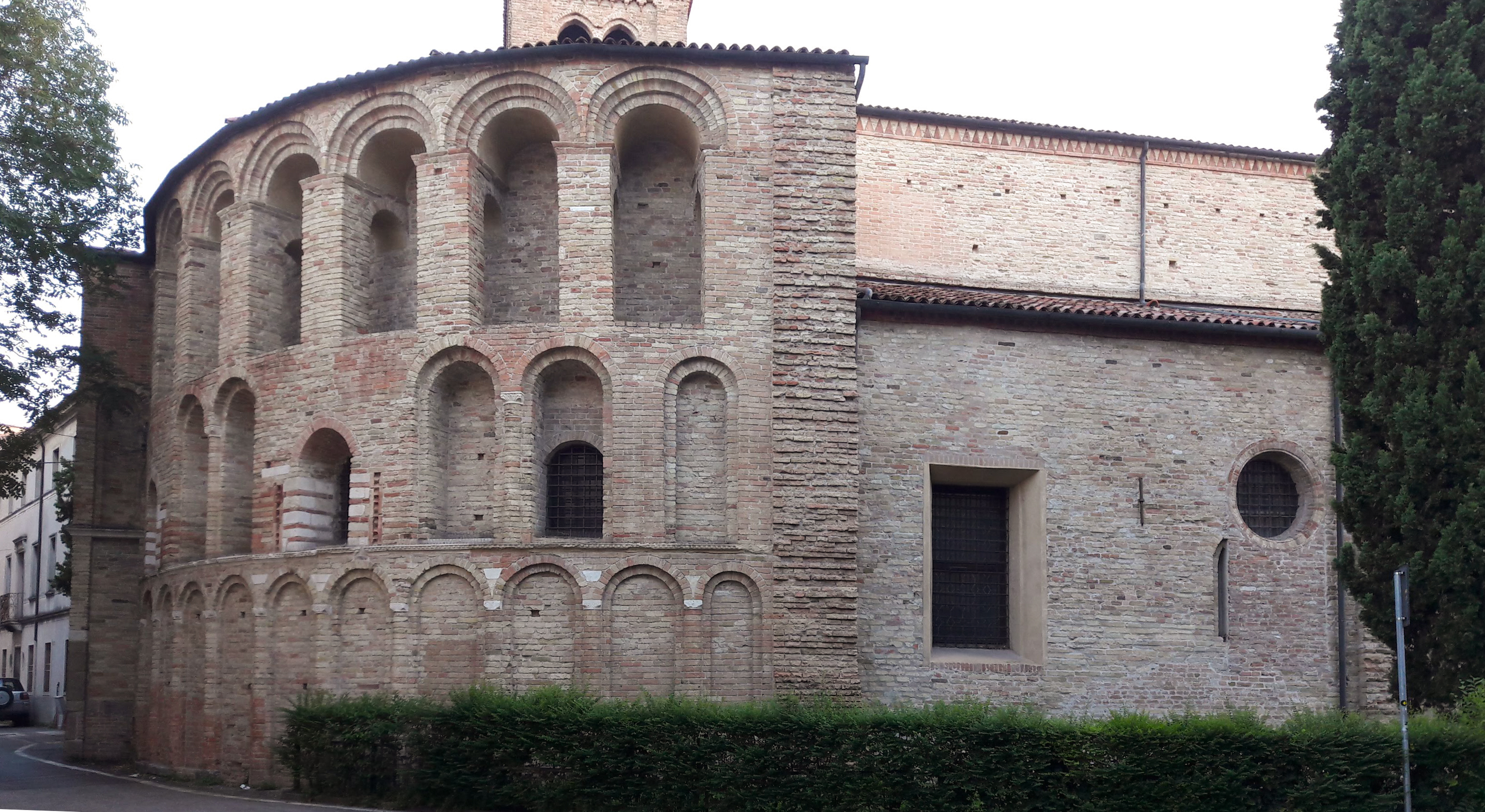
Santa Sofia, 10th century apse

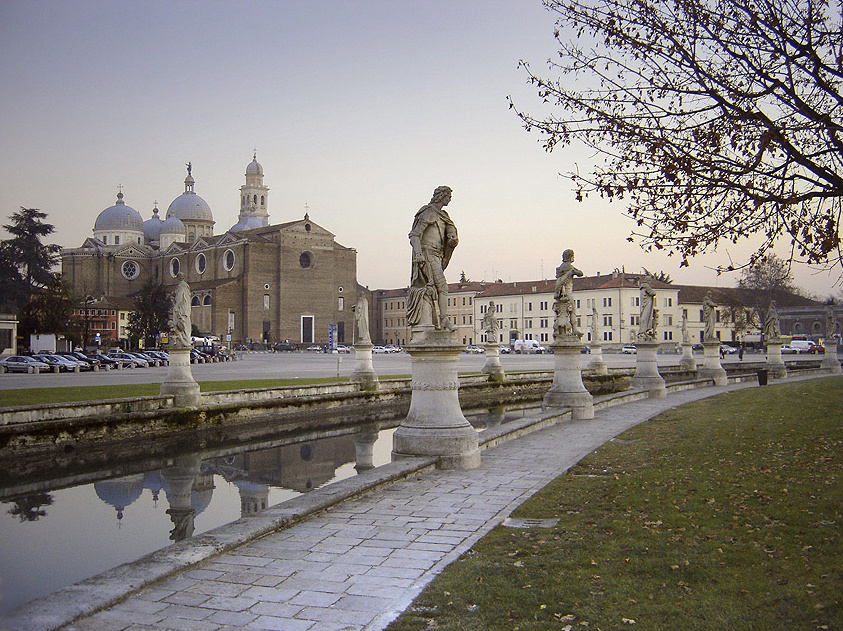
The Basilica of St. Giustina, facing the great piazza of Prato della Valle

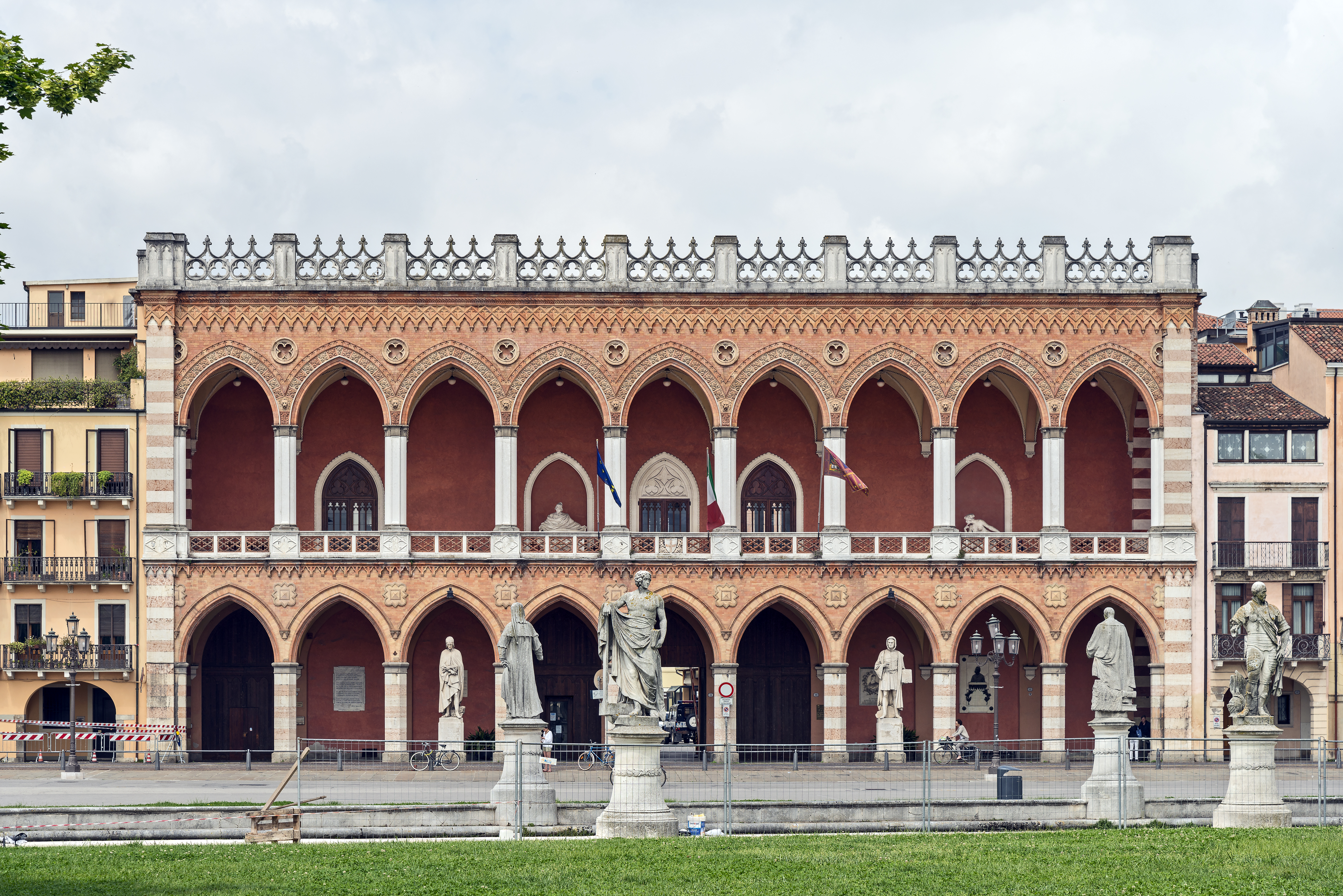
Neogothic Loggia Amulea (1906) at Prato della Valle, headquarters of the Padua firefighters until 1989

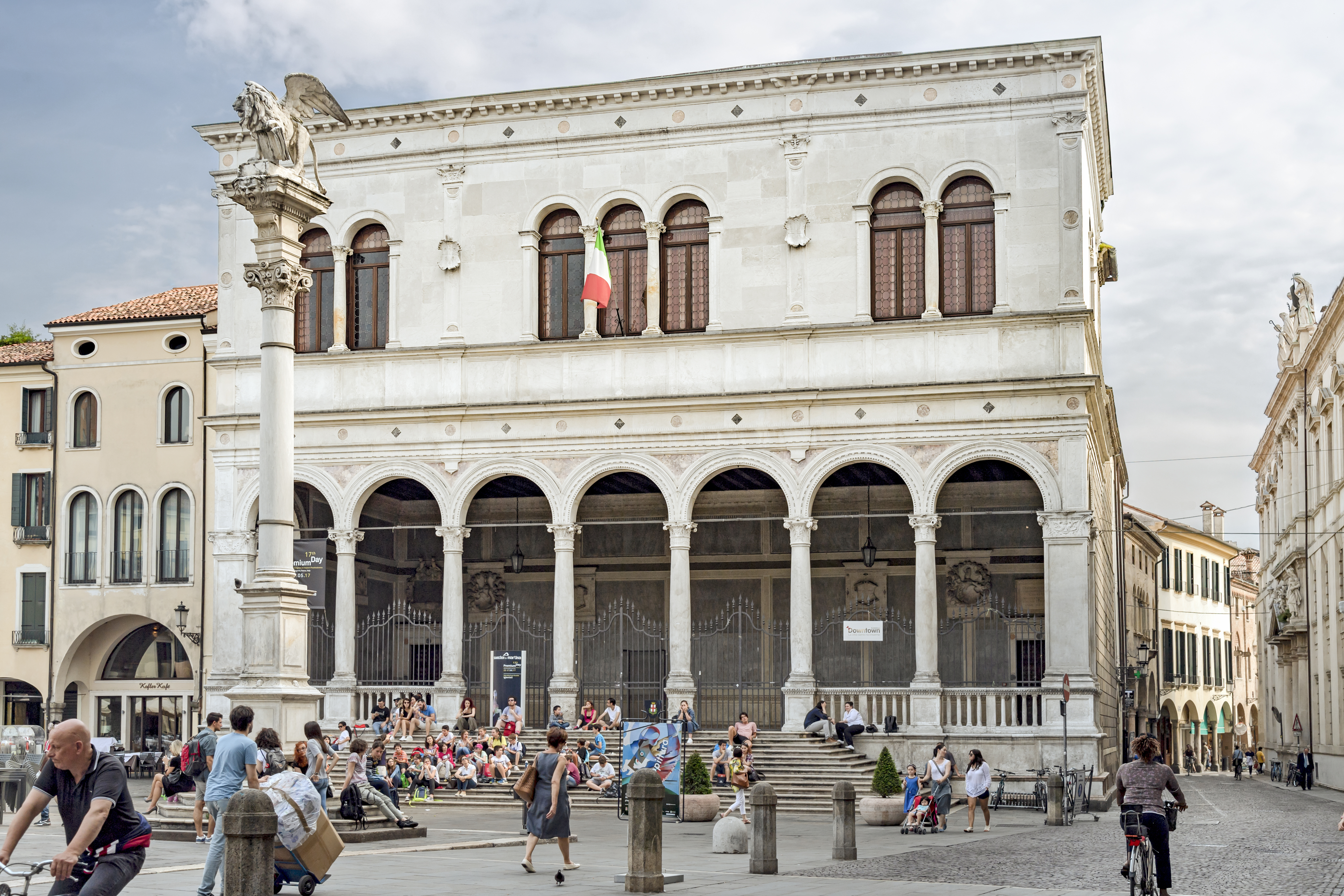
The Gran Guardia loggia at Piazza dei Signori

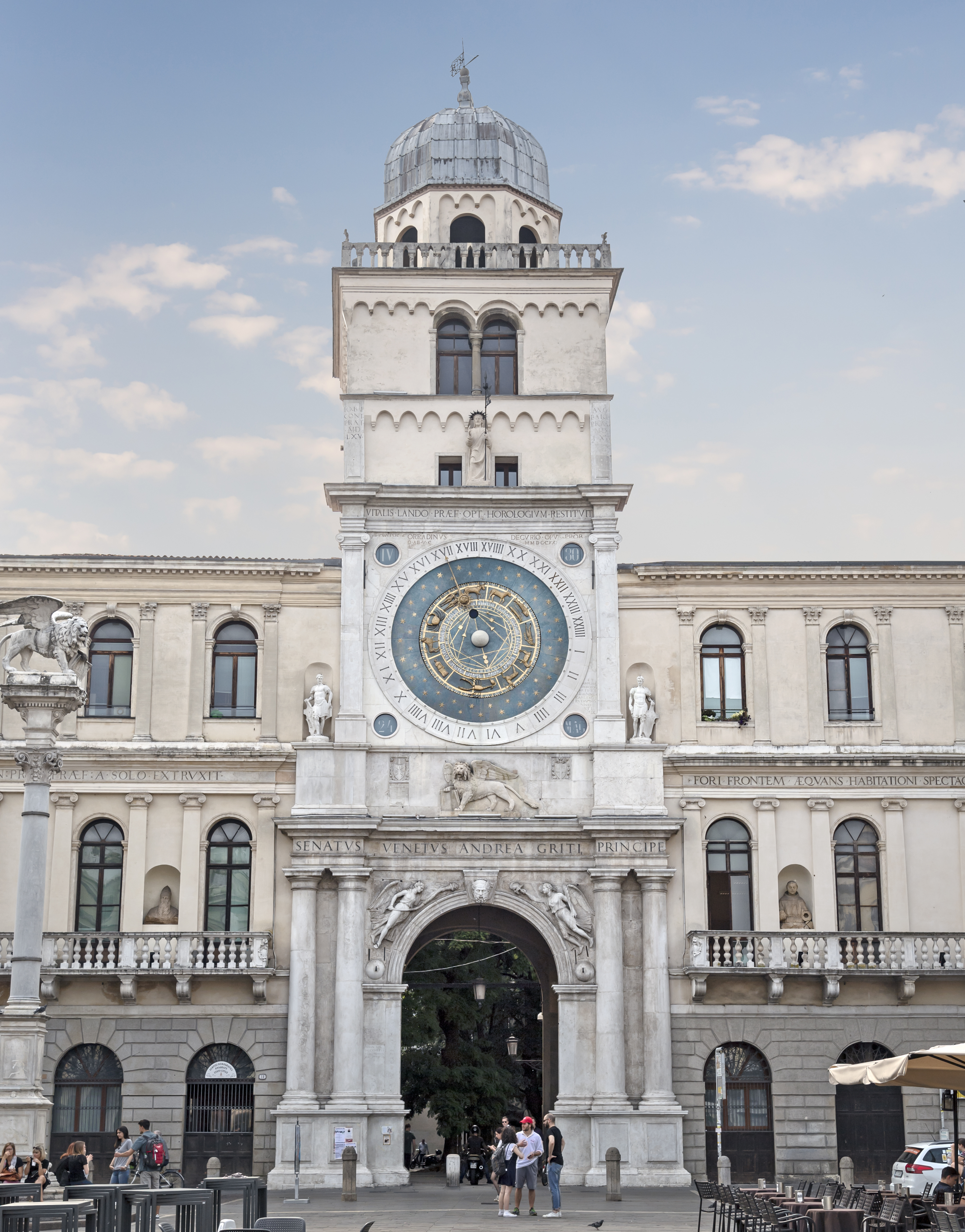
The astronomical clock, Piazza dei Signori

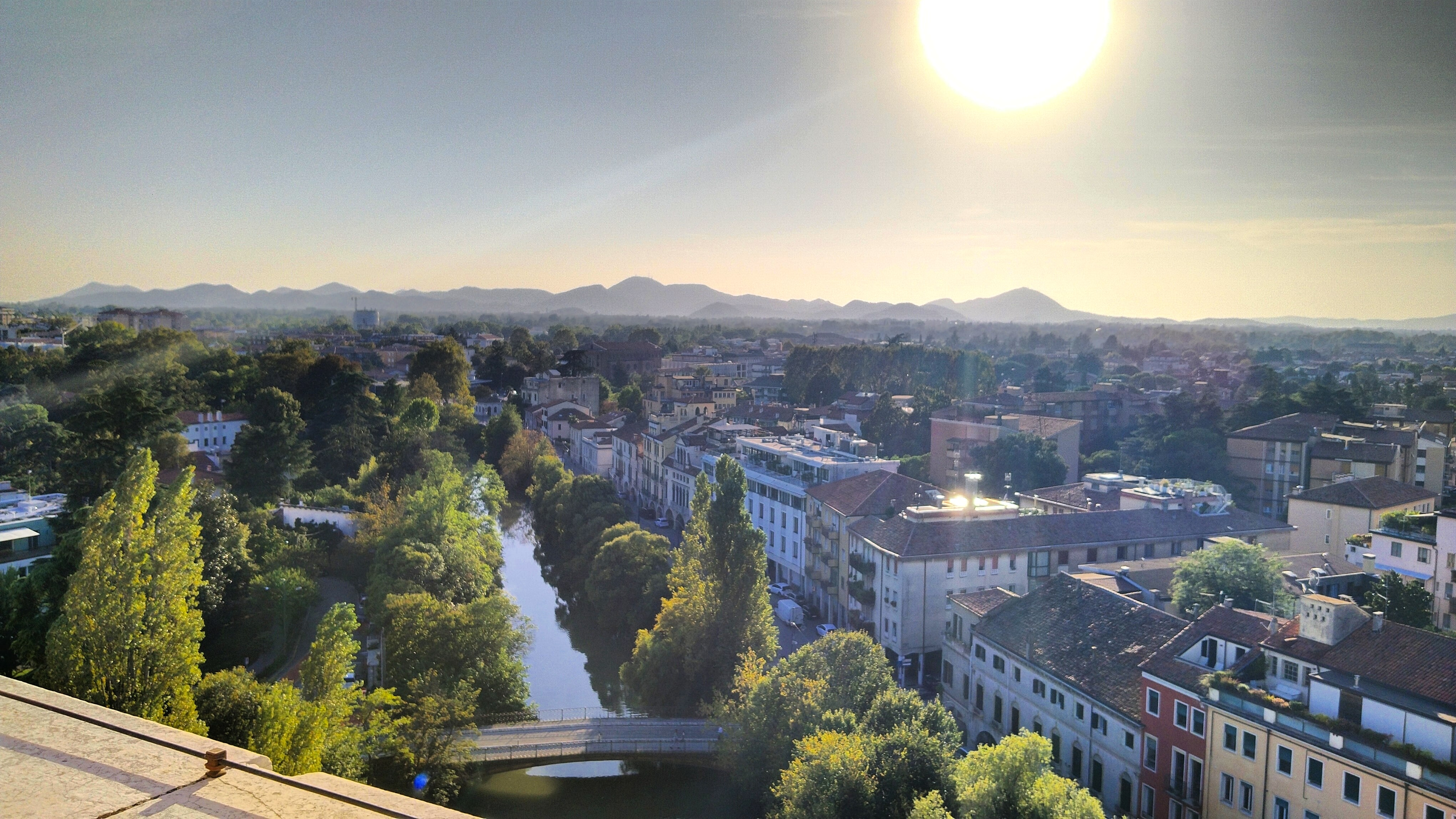
View from the top of La Specola

== Culture ==
Orto botanico di Padova
UNESCO World Heritage Site
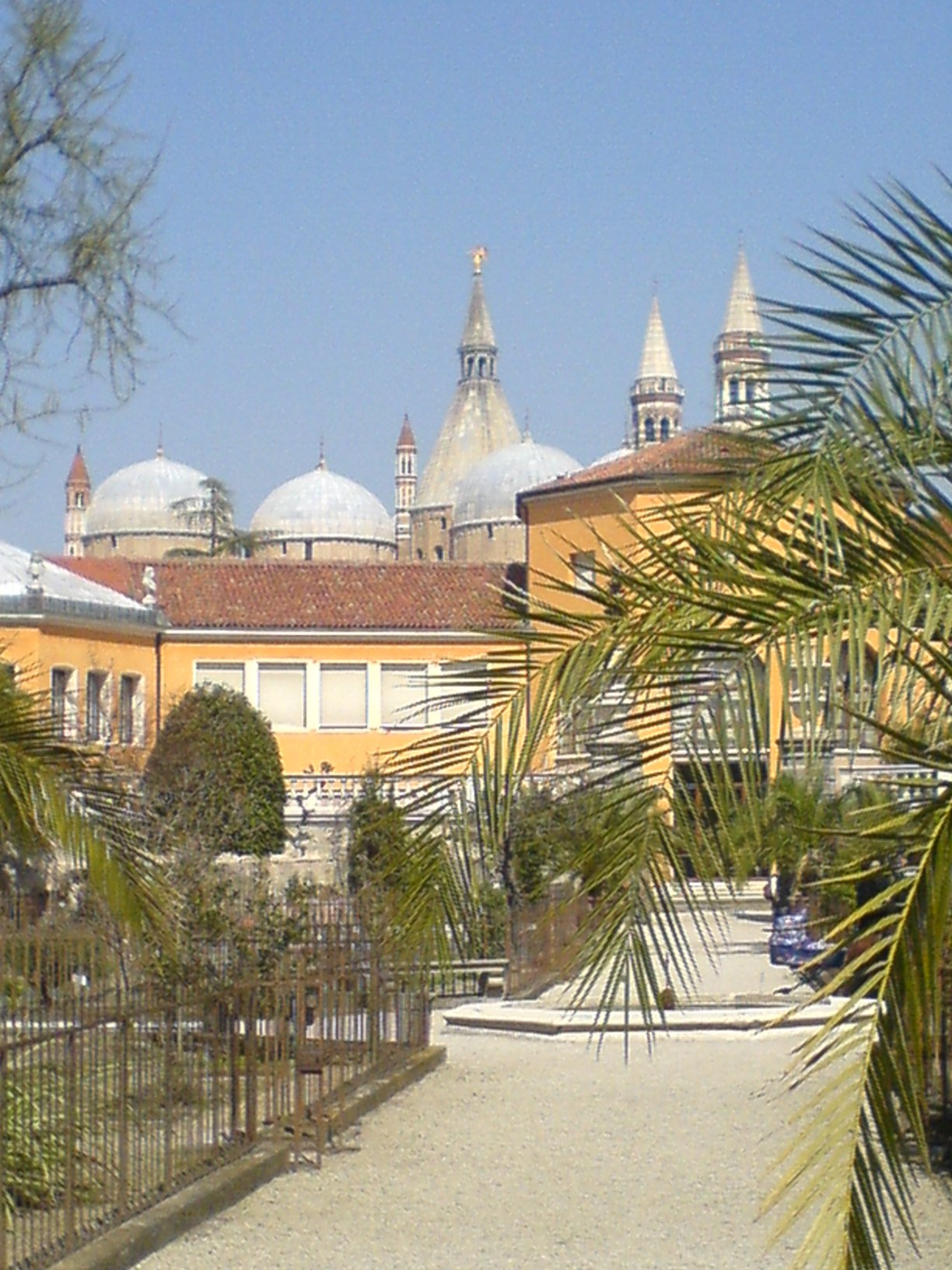
- The Botanical Garden of Padova today; in the background, the Basilica of Sant'Antonio
- Interactive map of Orto botanico di Padova
- Criteria: Cultural: ii, iii
- Reference: 824
- Inscription: 1997 (21st Session)
- Area: 2.2 ha (5.4 acres)
- Buffer zone: 11.4 ha (28 acres)

Padua has long been acclaimed for its university, founded in 1222. Under the rule of Venice the university was governed by a board of three patricians, called the Riformatori dello Studio di Padova. The list of notable professors and alumni is long, containing, among others, the names of Bembo, Sperone Speroni, the anatomist Vesalius, Copernicus, Fallopius, Fabrizio d'Acquapendente, Galileo Galilei, William Harvey, Pietro Pomponazzi, Reginald, later Cardinal Pole, Scaliger, Tasso, and Jan Zamoyski. It is also where, in 1678, Elena Lucrezia Cornaro Piscopia became the first woman in the world to graduate from university. The university hosts the oldest anatomy theatre, built in 1594.

The university also hosts the oldest botanical garden (1545) in the world. The botanical garden Orto Botanico di Padova was founded as the garden of curative herbs attached to the University's faculty of medicine. The Senate of the Venetian republic decided that knowledge of herbal remedies would reduce errors made by pharmacists, so the garden was built. Over time, the Venetian republic funded field trips that gathered plants from all over the world, making it an important place for the introduction of many exotic plants. It still contains an important collection of rare plants.

The place of Padua in the history of art is nearly as important as its place in the history of learning. The presence of the university attracted many distinguished artists, such as Giotto, Fra Filippo Lippi, and Donatello; and for native art there was the school of Francesco Squarcione, whence issued Mantegna. Francesco Petrarca (commonly anglicized as Petrarch), a scholar, poet of the Italian Renaissance, and one of the earliest humanists, was Canonico at the Padua Cathedral (Duomo), invited by Francesco I da Carrara, lord of Padua. Petrarca lived in the canonical house via Dietro Duomo 26/28 in 1349 which remained his property until 1374. His house in Padua was a stopover for numerous historical figures, such as the Carrara princes and Giovanni Boccaccio.

Padua is the birthplace of the celebrated architect Andrea Palladio, whose 16th-century villas in the area of Padua, Venice, Vicenza and Treviso are among the most notable of Italy and they were often copied during the 18th and 19th centuries; and of Giovanni Battista Belzoni, adventurer, engineer, and egyptologist. The sculptor Antonio Canova produced his first work in Padua, one of which is among the statues of Prato della Valle (presently a copy is displayed in the open air, while the original is in the Musei Civici). In Prato della Valle, there is the statue of Antonio Canova (by Giovanni Ferrari), which depicts the sculptor in the act of sculpting the bust of the prosecutor Antonio Cappello.

The Antonianum is settled among Prato della Valle, the Basilica of Saint Anthony and the Botanic Garden. It was built in 1897 by the Jesuit fathers and kept alive until 2002. During World War II, under the leadership of P. Messori Roncaglia SJ, it became the center of the resistance movement against the Nazis. Indeed, it briefly survived P. Messori's death and was sold by the Jesuits in 2004. Padua also plays host to the majority of The Taming of the Shrew by William Shakespeare and in Much Ado About Nothing Benedick is named as "Signior Benedick of Padua". Paolo De Poli, painter and enamellist, author of decorative panels and design objects, 15 times invited to the Venice Biennale was born in Padua. The electronic musician Tying Tiffany was also born in Padua.

== Economy ==
The industrial area of Padova was created in the eastern part of the city in 1946; it is now one of the biggest industrial zones in Europe, having an area of 11 million sqm. The main offices of 1,300 industries are based here, employing 50,000 people. In the industrial zone, there are two railway stations, one fluvial port, three truck terminals, two highway exits and a lot of connected services, such as hotels, post offices and directional centres. According to data released by the Italian Ministry of the Economy and Finances, based on declared income from tax filings, the total average per capita gross income in Padova was €30,134 for 2022, well above the declared average for Italy at €20,039. The rate of local income tax for Padova has trended steadily upwards from 0.20% in 2001. In 2024, the city levied a local income tax with rates that ranged from 0.69% to 0.80% depending on the bracket.

== Transport ==
=== By car ===
By car, there are 2 motorways (autostrade in Italian): A4 Brescia-Padova, connecting it to Verona (then to Brenner Pass, Innsbruck, and Bavaria) and Milan (then Switzerland, Turin, and France); A4 Padova-Venezia, to Venice then Belluno (for Dolomites holiday resorts like Cortina), Trieste, and Tarvisio (for Austria, Slovenia, Croatia, and Eastern Europe); A13 Bologna-Padova, to Ferrara and Bologna (then Central and South Italy). Roads connect Padua with all the large and small centers of the region. A motorway with more than 20 exits surrounds the city, connecting districts and the small towns of the surrounding region.

=== By rail ===
Padua has two railway stations open to passengers. The main station Stazione di Padova has 11 platforms and is sometimes colloquially referred to as "Padova Centrale"; it is one of the biggest stations in Italy. More than 450 trains per day leave Padova. The station is used by over 20 million passengers per year. From Padova, high speed trains connect to Milan, Rome, Bologna, Florence and Venice; one can reach Milan in 1 hour and 59 minutes, Rome in 3 hours 13 minutes and Venice in 30 minutes. There are also international day trains to Zurich and Munich, and overnight sleeper services to Munich and Vienna (ÖBB). The station was opened in 1842 when the service started on the first part of the Milan–Venice railway (the "Imperial Regia Ferrovia Ferdinandea") built from Padua to Marghera through Mestre. Porta Marghera is a major port of the Venetian area. Railways enthusiasts can visit the Signal Box A (Cabina A), preserved by the "Società Veneta Ferrovie" (a society named after the former public works and railway company, based in "Piazza Eremitani" in Padua) association.

=== By aeroplane ===
Padua is approximately 50 km (31 mi) away from Venice Marco Polo Airport which is the nearest airport with regular commercial service. Padua is also served by the Verona Villafranca Airport and Treviso Airport. The Gino Allegri, or Aeroporto civile di Padova "Gino Allegri", is no longer served by regularly scheduled flights. Padua is, however, the home of one of Italy's four area control centres.

=== Public transport ===
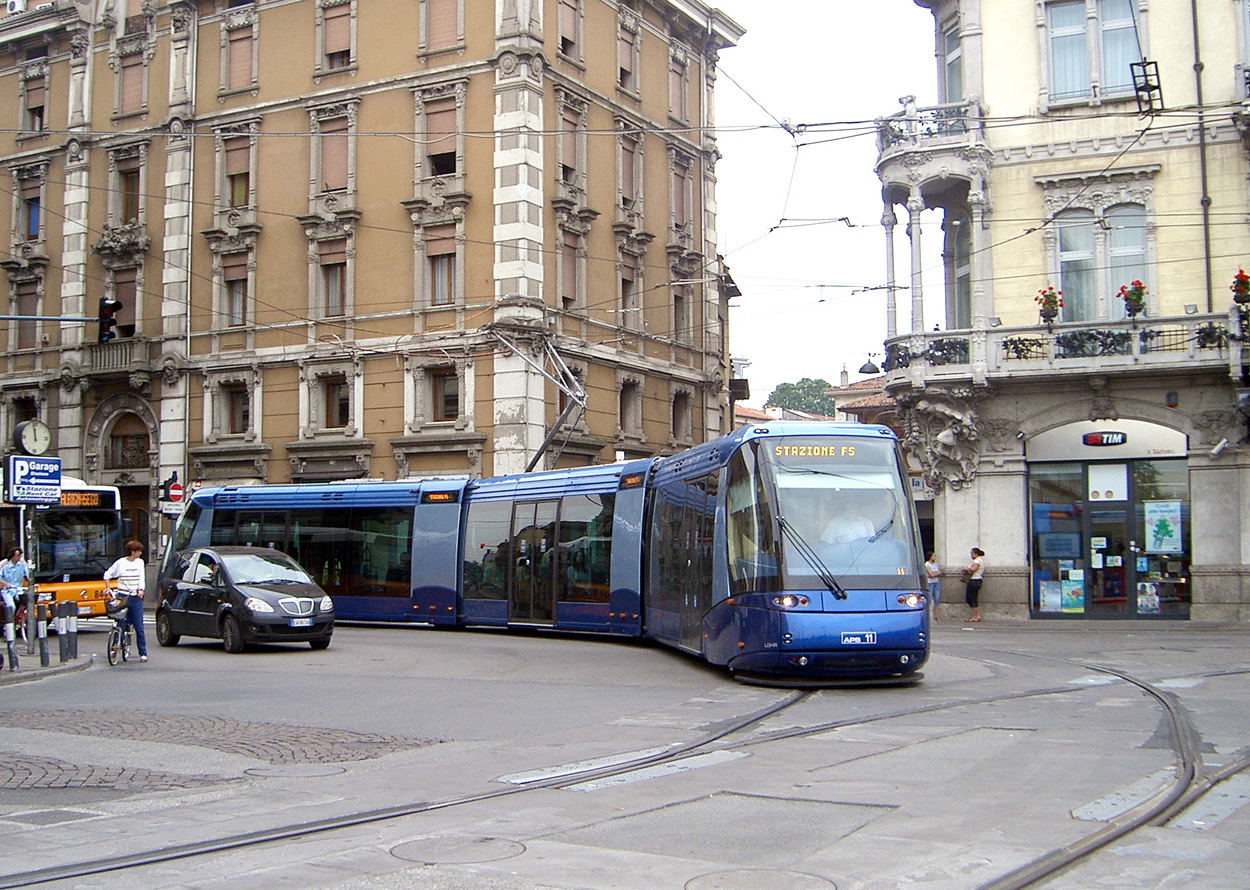
Street tram in Padua

Urban public transport includes public buses together with a new Translohr guided tramway (connecting Albignasego, in the south of Padua, with Pontevigodarzere in the north of the city, thanks to the new line built in 2009) and private taxis. The city centre is partly closed to vehicles, except for residents and permitted vehicles. There are some car parks surrounding the district. In this area, as well, there are some streets and squares restricted to pedestrian and bicycle use only. Padua has approximately 40 bus lines, which are served by new buses (purchased in 2008–2009). The Veneto region is building a regional rail line (S-Bahn-like system) around the city with 15 new stations. Its name would be SFMR and it would reach the province of Venice.

=== Statistics ===
The average amount of time people spend commuting with public transit in Padova, Vicenza, and Verona, for example to and from work, on a weekday is 46 min. 5% of public transit riders, ride for more than 2 hours every day. The average amount of time people wait at a stop or station for public transit is 13 min, while 30% of riders wait for over 20 minutes on average every day. The average distance people usually ride in a single trip with public transit is 4.7 km, while 4% travel for over 12 km in a single direction.

== Sport ==
Padua is the home of Calcio Padova, an association football club that plays in Italy's Serie B, and who played 16 Serie A championships (last 2 in 1995 and 1996, but the previous 14 between 1929 and 1962); Petrarca Rugby, a rugby union team winner of 14 national championships (all between 1970 and 2022) and 2 national cups that plays in the Top12 league; and the Pallavolo Padova volleyball club, once called Petrarca Padova, which plays in the Italian first division (Superlega) and who won a CEV cup in 1994. Basketball, cycling (Padua has been for several years home of the famous Giro del Veneto), rowing (two teams among the best ones in Italy, Canottieri Padova and Padova Canottaggio SOURCE?), horseback-riding, and swimming are popular sports too.

The main venues are the following: Stadio Euganeo for football, rugby (it occasionally hosts the national team during the Autumn internationals) and athletics, about 32,000 seats; Stadio Plebiscito for rugby union, about 9,000 seats; Palazzetto dello Sport San Lazzaro for volleyball and basketball, about 5,000 seats; Ippodromo Breda – Le Padovanelle for horse races. The old Stadio Appiani, which hosted up to 21,000 people, presently reduced to 10,000 for security reasons twenty years ago, and near to Prato della Valle in the city central area, was recently restored and hosts some Calcio Padova training sessions, as well as youth games. There is also a small ice stadium for skating and hockey, with about 1,000 seats. Italy international rugby players Mauro and Mirco Bergamasco, Marco Bortolami, Andrea Marcato, and Leonardo Ghiraldini were all born in Padua. All of them started their careers in Petrarca Padova. Well known footballers from Padua are Francesco Toldo, who was born here, and Alessandro Del Piero, who started his professional career in Padova.

== International relations ==
Padua hosts consulates for several nations, including those of Canada, Croatia, Ivory Coast, Peru, Poland, Switzerland, and Uruguay. A consulate for South Korea was planned in 2014 and a consulate for Moldova was opened on 1 August 2014.

=== Twin towns – sister cities ===
Padua is twinned with:

- Nancy, France, since 1964
- Freiburg im Breisgau, Germany, since 1967
- Boston, United States, since 1983
- Handan, China, since 1988
- Iași, Romania, since 1995
- Beira, Mozambique, since 1995
- Coimbra, Portugal, since 1998
- Zadar, Croatia, since 2003
- Oxford, England, United Kingdom, since 2019

== Notable people ==
- Livy (59 BC – 17 AD), historian.
- St. Anthony of Padua (1195–1231), Franciscan priest, saint, and doctor of the Church.
- Marsilius of Padua (c. 1270 – c. 1342), scholar, trained in medicine.
- Maddalena Scrovegni (c. 1356 – 1429), humanist.
- Francesco Zabarella (1360–1417), cardinal and canonist.
- Simon of Cremona (d. 1390 in Padua), writer and preacher.
- Judah Minz (c. 1405–1508), Italian rabbi.
- Abraham Minz (c. 1440–1520), Italian rabbi.
- Marin Barleti (c. 1450–1512), Albanian historian, humanist, and Catholic priest.
- Andrea Riccio (c. 1470 – 1532), sculptor and occasional architect.
- Meir Katzenellenbogen (1482–1565), Chief Rabbi of Padua, authority on Talmudic, and Rabbinical matters.
- Ruzzante (1496–1542), writer, playwright, and actor.
- Andrea Palladio (1508–1580), architect.
- Samuel Judah Katzenellenbogen (1521–1597), Italian Rabbi.
- Camilla Erculiani (died c. 1584), Italian apothecary tried by the Roman Inquisition.
- Jacopo Zabarella (1533–1589), professor of philosophy and science.
- Saul Wahl (1541–1617), King of Poland for a day.
- Ercole Sassonia (1551–1607), physician.
- Giovanni Antonio Magini (1555–1617), astronomer, astrologer, cartographer, and mathematician.
- Tiziano Aspetti (1557–1606), sculptor.
- Galileo Galilei (1564–1642), physicist, mathematician, astronomer, and philosopher, father of modern science.
- Stefano Landi (1586–1639), early music composer.
- Moses Chayyim Catalan (d. 1661), Jewish Italian poet.
- Bartolomeo Cristofori (1655–1731), inventor of the piano.
- Giovanni Battista Morgagni (1682–1771), anatomist, father of modern anatomical pathology.
- Giuseppe Tartini (1692–1770), composer, violinist, and music theorist.
- Giovanni Benedetto Platti (possibly 1697–1763), oboist and composer.
- Vincenzo Rota (1703–1785), dramatist.
- Moshe Chaim Luzzatto (1707–1746), rabbi, kabbalist, and philosopher.
- Melchiorre Cesarotti (1730–1808), poet, translator, and theorist.
- Giovanni Battista Belzoni (1778–1823), explorer and archaeologist.
- Ippolito Nievo (1831–1861), writer.
- Arrigo Boito (1842–1918), poet, journalist, novelist, librettist. and composer.
- Johann von Pallavicini (1848–1941), Austro-Hungarian diplomat.
- Tullio Levi-Civita (1873–1941), mathematician.
- Giuseppe Valentini (1900–1979), priest and historian, one of the founders and secretary general of the Royal Institute of the Albanian Studies.
- Blessed Elisa Angela Meneguzzi (1901–1941), Catholic professed religious of the Sisters of Saint Francis de Sales.
- Paolo De Poli (1905–1996), painter and designer.
- Lina Bruna Rasa (1907–1984), operatic soprano.
- Giorgio Perlasca (1910–1992), Righteous Among the Nations.
- Antonio Negri (1933–2023), political philosopher.
- Claudio Scimone (1934–2018), orchestral conductor.
- Renato Pengo (born 1943), artist and painter.
- Lucia Valentini Terrani (1946–1998), operatic mezzo soprano.
- Massimo Carlotto (born 1956), writer and playwright.
- Carlo Mazzacurati (1956–2014), film director and screenwriter.
- Maurizio Cattelan (born 1960), artist.
- Carlo Covi (born 1961), Venetist and social-democratic politician and rally driver.
- Kenny Random (born 1971), artist and writer.
- Fabrizio Sotti (born 1975), musician.
- Chiara Galiazzo (born 1986), singer.

=== Sport ===
- Mario Mazzacurati (1903–1985), racing driver.
- Novella Calligaris (born 1954), swimmer and Olympic medallist.
- Riccardo Patrese (born 1954), racing driver.
- Francesco Toldo (born 1971), footballer.
- Giorgio Pantano (born 1979), racing driver.
- Mirco Bergamasco (born 1983), rugby union player.
- Andrea Marcato (born 1983), rugby union player.
- Mattia Turetta (born 1984), professional footballer.
- Michele Faccin (born 1990), racing driver.
- Enrico Miglioranzi (born 1991), ice hockey player.
- Riccardo Agostini (born 1994), racing driver.
- Giammarco Levorato (born 2003), racing driver.
- Lorenzo Patrese (born 2005), racing driver.

== See also ==
- Diocesan museum of Padua, Italy
- Hotel Terme Millepini
- Padua metropolitan area
- Palazzo Vigodarzere, Padua
- Province of Padua
- Roman Catholic Diocese of Padua
- Tangenziale di Padova
- Triumphal Arch of Vallaresso
- Via Anelli Wall
