= Triumphal Arch of Vallaresso =

17th-century monumental arch in Padua, Veneto, Italy

Coordinates: 45°24′25″N 11°52′19″E

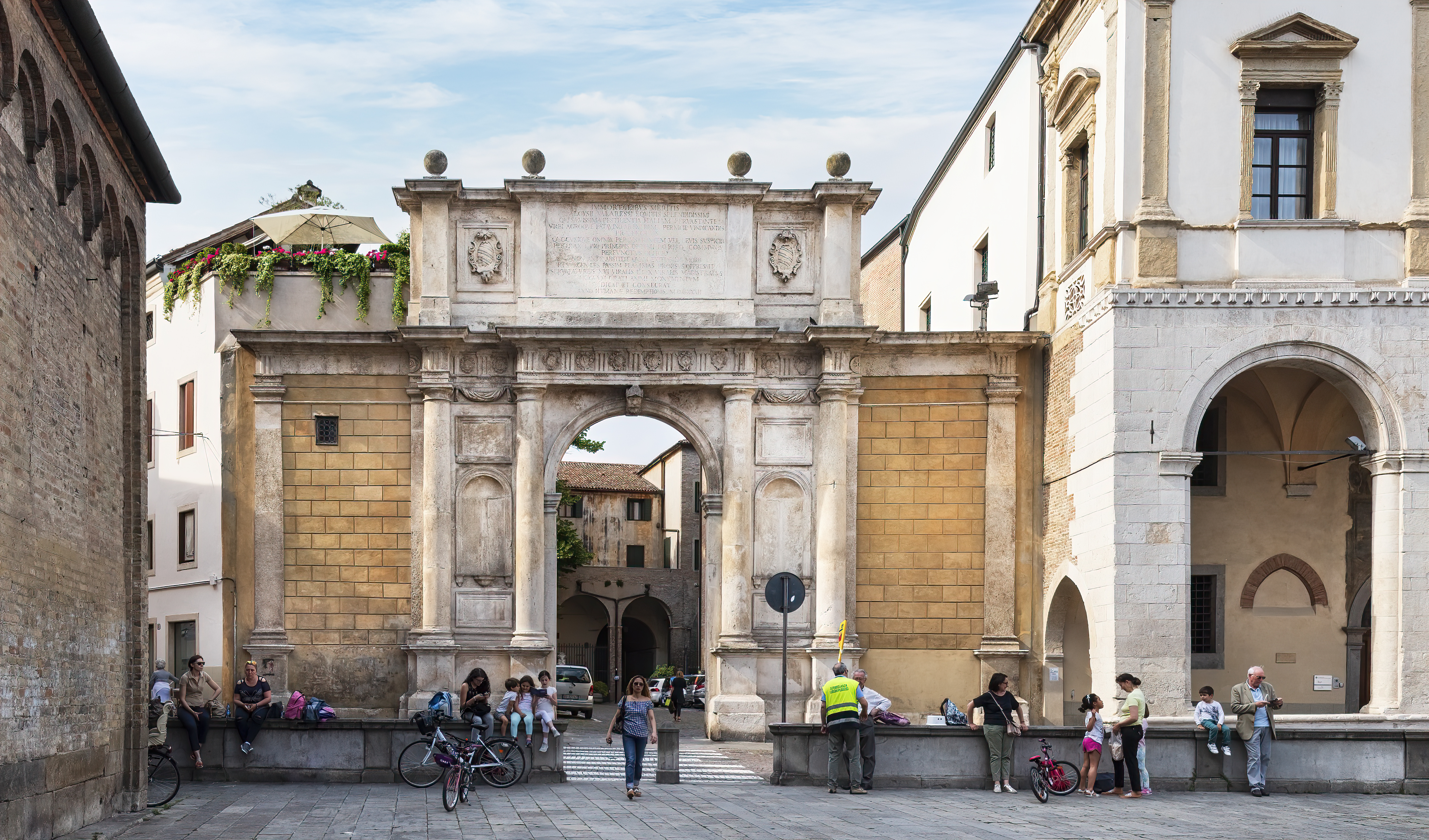
Arco Vallaresso

The Triumphal Arch of Vallaresso, or locally referred to as the Arco Vallaresso is a 17th-century monumental arch in the town center of Padua, region of Veneto, Italy. In 1632, the arch, designed by Giambattista della Scala, was meant to honor Alvise Vallaresso, Venetian captain of the town, for his diligence in attempting to stem the Bubonic plague in Padua.

The arch is a marble facade with an open portal facing the Piazza of the Padua Cathedral, to the left of the church when exiting. It is adjacent to the former Monte de Pieta building. The counter facade is a plain wall with the central opening. The decorative facade is in a sober classical style: four doric columns on plinths. Each couple frame an empty sculpture niche. The columns has a slender architrave, but support an elegant frieze with shields separated by triglyphs. The attic has a central inscription describing the reasons for erecting the arch, flanked by two coat of arms.

Historians recall that Vallaresso did not flinch at imposing measures to stop the spread of the disease, such as quarantine of the sick, burials outside of the wall, and utilizing the local lazzaretto to isolate some of the ill. While the mortality was high, the 1631 plague season in Padua was over in a few months.
