= Via Anelli Wall =

Coordinates: 45.411°N 11.904°E

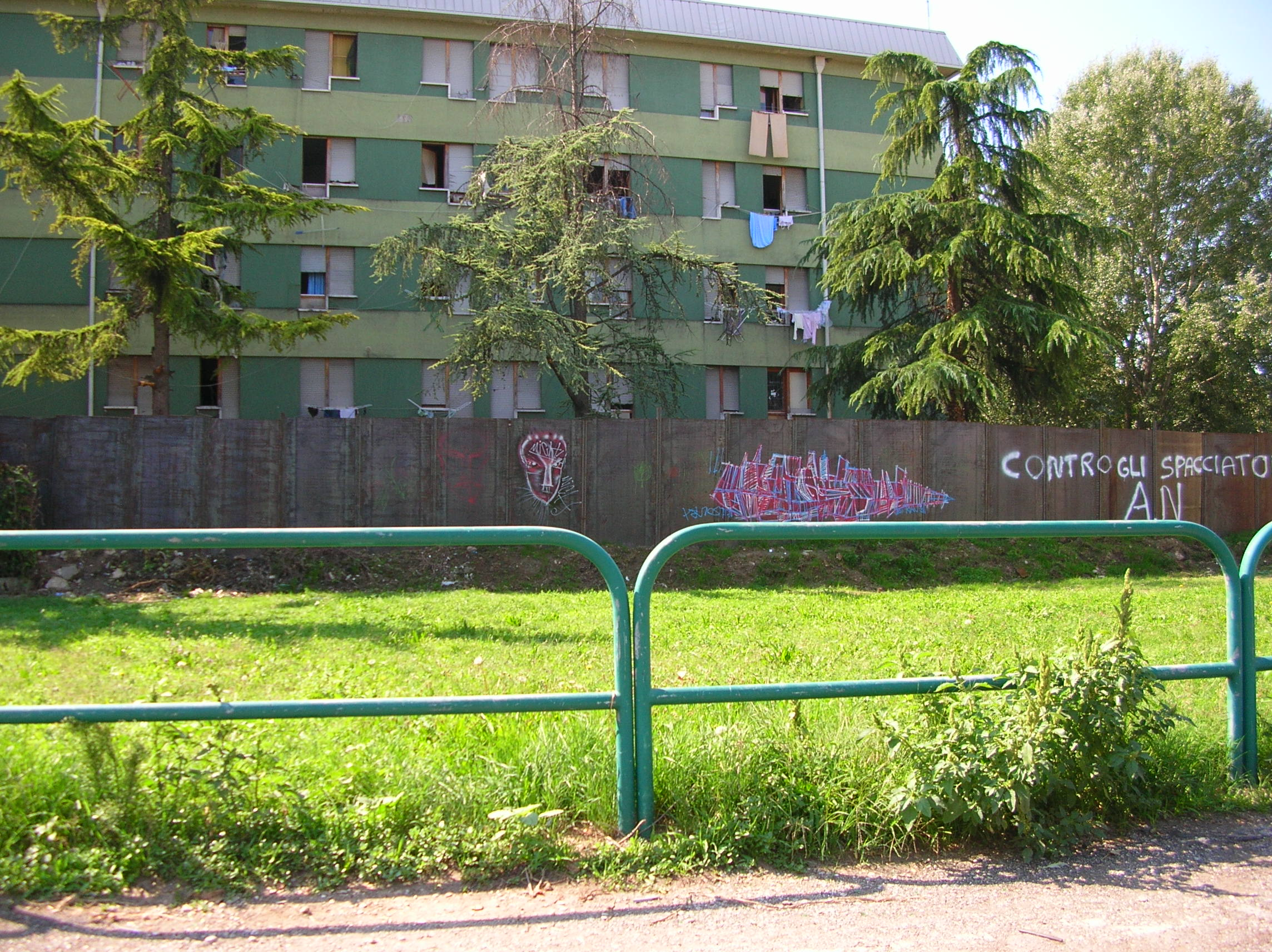
Via Anelli Wall

The Via Anelli Wall was a three-metre-high wall built of steel, with a length of eighty four metres, which encircled the Via Anelli quarter of Padua, northern Italy. It was built in 2006 and torn down in 2007. The area contains six apartment blocks that house roughly 1500 people. The area used to be popular with students, but is now mainly populated by people from Africa seeking asylum in Italy.

The building of the wall was motivated by the extremely high crime rate in this quarter. In particular the estate was the scene of mass rioting between gangs made up of immigrants from Nigeria and Morocco, and was well known for drug dealing. The construction of the wall, which was equipped with a checkpoint, was completed in two days; some opponents dubbed it Padua's Berlin Wall. The wall was demolished between September and October 2007 after all the buildings inside it had been evacuated and all the people living there had been guaranteed fair resettlement.
