= Maddalena Scrovegni =

Italian humanist (c.1356–1429)

- Born: c. 1356; Padua, Italy
- Died: 1429 (aged 72–73); Venice, Italy
- Occupation: Humanist
- Years active: 1380s-1429

Maddalena Scrovegni (1356 ca.-1429) was an Italian humanist.

== Biography ==
Maddalena Scrovegni was from a very wealthy family from Padua, Italy; she was the only daughter in the family. Her father was Ugolino da Scrovegni. She married Francesco Manfredi, a knight, in 1376. Manfredi died by 1381.

In 1383, Scrovegni wrote a letter to the Carraresi family to exonerate her family after they were exiled in Padua. The family was welcomed back into Paduan society under the Carraresi patron, Francesco il Vecchio. She was the subject of Antoni Loschi's poem The Temple of Chastity, written in 1389. In the poem, Loschi depicts Scrovegni as Chastity and that her study or home was a temple. The poem was commissioned by the House of Visconti in response to Scrovegni's letter.

Scrovegni, her father, and her brothers were exiled to Venice in 1390. In Venice, she founded a hospice. She died in Venice in 1429.

Scrovegni communicated with Angela Nogarola.
