= Vincenzo Rota =

Italian dramatist

Vincenzo Rota (15 May 1703 - 10 September 1785) was an Italian dramatist mainly of comedies.

He was born in Padua. Source claims that he was a hunchback (scoliotic) and a misery to look at, despite his vivacious spirit.

He studied in seminary and was ordained a priest in 1726. He was hired as a teacher in Rovigo to teach rhetoric, and subsequently as a tutor to children of the Minucci family in Serravalle. He then became tutor of the children of the Marchese Pietro Gabrielli in Venice. Upon the marquis' death, he then moved to Rome with their mother Contessa Teresa di Valvassone, as tutor and secretary of the Countess. He published some disputes with Jacopo Facciolati. He became a prolific author of dramatic comedies, including:

- La Zoccoletta pietosa
- La Morta viva
- Il Pastor geloso
- Il Fantasima
- Il Lavativo
- L'incendio del tempio di Sant'Antonio (1749)

He also worked on various translations and short novels. He was also a talented musician. He published compositions by his friend in Padua, the violinist Giuseppe Tartini.
