= Palazzo Vigodarzere, Padua =

Coordinates: 45.402030°N 11.877589°E

The Palazzo Vigodarzere, once known as Palazzo Zigno is a Neoclassical palace located on Via Rudana #35 in central Padua, region of Veneto, Italy.

== History ==
The design of the palace is attributed to the 18th-century architect Bernardino Maccarucci. It is notable by doric columns leading to a half-domed portal. The interior ceilings in the stairs were frescoed (1786) by Pier Francesco Novelli. The main salon was frescoed by Giovanni Battista Canal. The ornamentation was completed by Paolo Guidolini. In the 19th century, the palace was known for harboring Count Zigno's geological and fossil collections.
