= Paolo De Poli =

Italian enameller and painter (1905–1996)

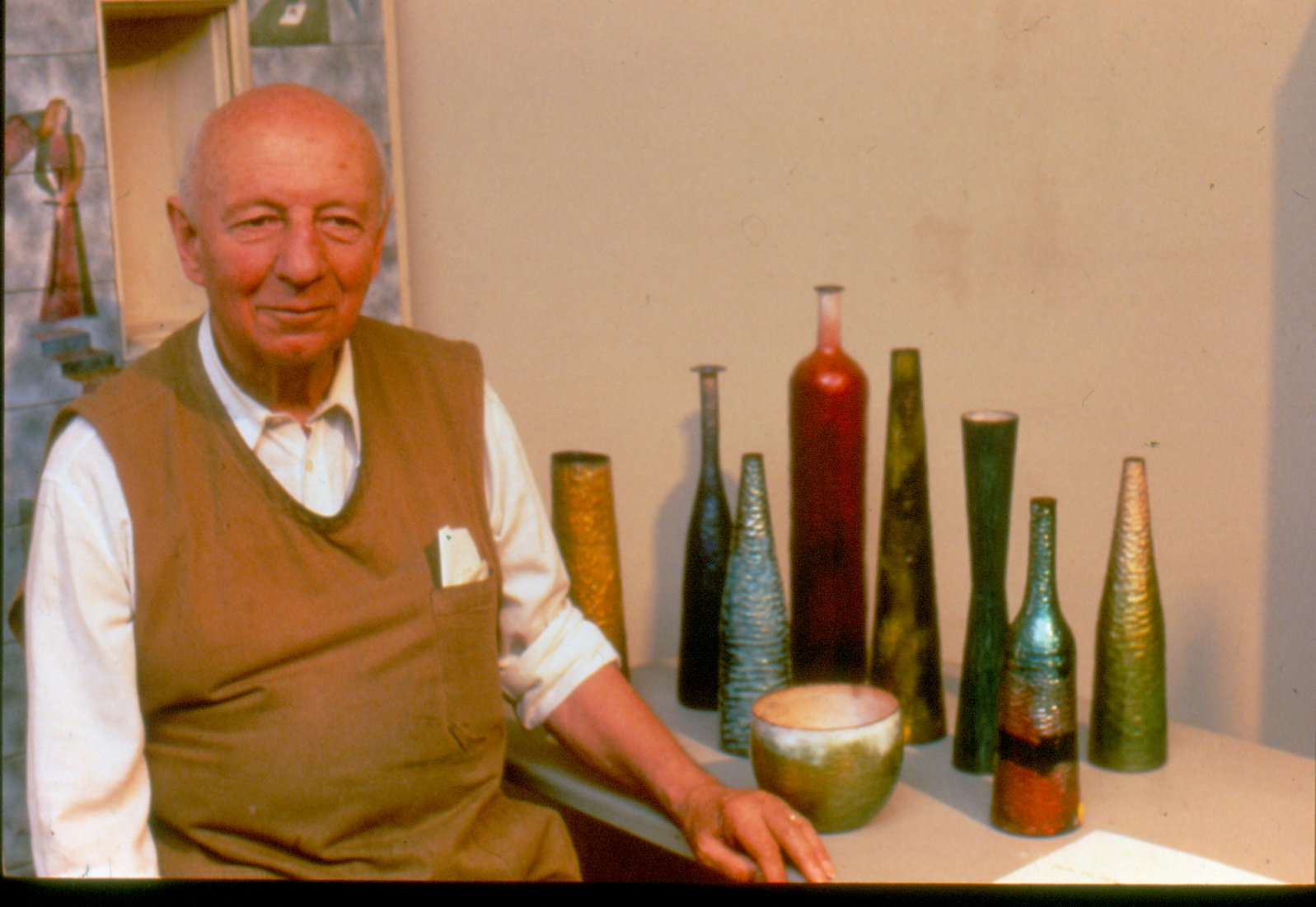
- De Poli in 1967
- Born: 1 August 1905; Padua, Italy
- Died: 21 September 1996 (aged 91); Padua, Italy
- Occupations: Enameller; painter
- Notable work: Arlecchino, Podestà Rusca
- Awards: Three gold medals from Milan Triennale

Paolo De Poli (1 August 1905 – 21 September 1996) was an Italian enameller and painter.

If we can speak of an Italian art of enamel, it is thanks to De Poli, to the road he opened up and followed faithfully, to the example of his orthodox technique, to his sureness of touch, to the esteem and admiration he has won. And we should to be grateful to him for this also. Gio Ponti

== Biography ==
Born in Padua, and after an early training in drawing and embossing on metal at the art school Pietro Selvatico of Padua and in oil painting in the studio of the Trentini painters in Verona, De Poli began a career as portrait and landscape painter. In 1926 he participated for the first time in the XV Venice Biennale with the oil Still life. In the thirties during his travels and visits to art museums and archaeological sites he has been exposed to the traditional and ancient art of vitreous enamel. Fascinated by these experiences, from 1933 onwards he devoted himself to creative works of enamels on metal. At first he experimented with small refined decorative objects of many shapes in brilliant colors. By improving the technique, he mastered the craft and reached the highest levels of innovation. In the forties he collaborated with Gio Ponti in the production of furniture and decorative panels. Later their collaboration led to new objects of design and animal motifs in sculptural forms. In addition to production of vases, bowls, trays, plates, cups, plaques and doorhandles in enamel on copper, he also worked on large panels for decorating the interiors of ships and ocean liners, hotels, universities, public buildings and homes of collectors, in Italy and abroad. Many works are the result of collaborations with architects-designers, such as Gio Ponti, Guglielmo Ulrich (it), Melchiorre Bega (it), and artists such as Filippo De Pisis, Bruno Saetti, Gino Severini, and Roberto Aloi.

He also dedicated himself to executing altarpieces and cycles of panels on the theme of the Stations of the Cross, preserved in churches of Padua, Abano Terme, Bergamo and Treviso. His creations were displayed in the main International Exhibition: Brussels in 1935, in Paris in 1937, in New York in 1939, and in several decorative shows and art fairs as those held in Florence, Cairo, Helsinki, Monaco, London, Oslo, Stockholm, Beirut etc. as part of the expression of the Italian style. He exhibited his enamel works 14 times at the Venice Biennale and 10 times at the Milan Triennale. As for the modern productions of Murano glasses and Faenza majolica, many of his works in enamel on copper, as wall panels and design objects, now belong to the permanent collection of important museums of decorative arts and design.

He has always been actively involved in the defence of the cultural heritage and in the promotion and protection of arts and crafts through associations and boards. From 1960 to 1973 he served as member of the board of directors of the Milan Triennale. In 1970 he was decorated with the title Cavaliere del Lavoro. He died in Padua. His personal archive of designs, prototypes, photographs and correspondence is entrusted to the Archivio Progetti of IUAV University of Venice.

== Works ==
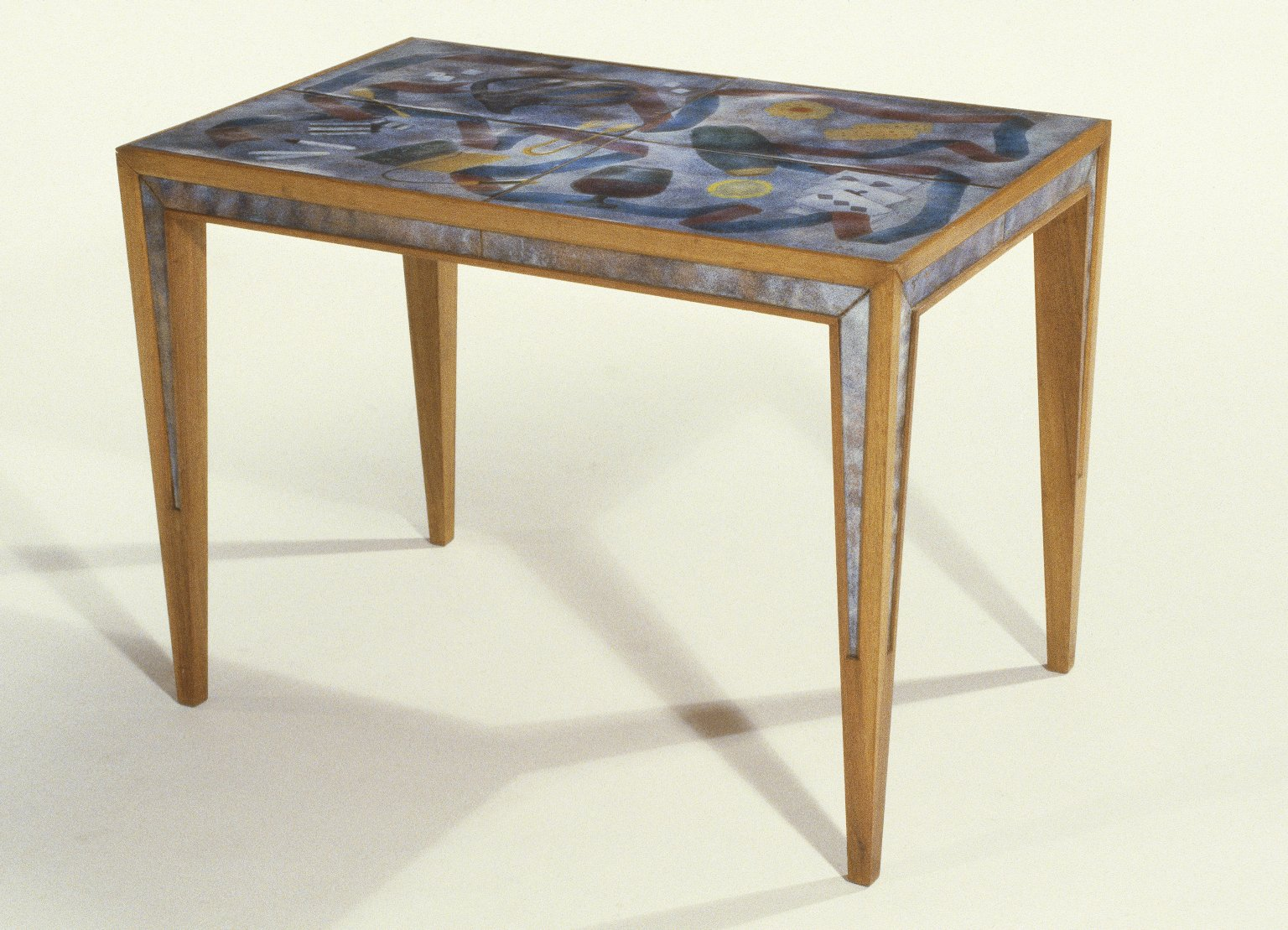
Paolo De Poli and Gio Ponti Table, c. 1942. Brooklyn Museum

In addition to bowls, vases, trays, furniture and panels, Paolo De Poli has executed sculptures and design objects such as:

- Podestà Rusca and Vescovo Giordano, enamel panels (in collaboration with Gio Ponti), Bo Palace, University of Padua, 1940.
- Table, enamel and wood,(in collaboration with Gio Ponti), Brooklyn Museum, New York, c. 1942
- The four seasons, enamel panels (in collaboration with Gio Ponti), first class hall of the SS Conte Grande of the Società di Navigazione Italia, 1949.
- Arlecchino, enamel panel (in collaboration with Gio Ponti), ship SS Conte Biancamano of the Società di Navigazione Italia, 1949.
- Panel, Musei Civici, Padua, 1951.
- Moonlight, enamel panel, design by Bruno Saetti, 1956.
- The big cock, sculpture, model by Marcello Mascherini, 1957.
- Spring-Summer, enamel panel, design by Gino Severini, 1957.
- The big peacock, sculpture, Gallery of Modern Art, Ca' Pesaro, Venice, 1962.
- Vases, Museum of Modern and Contemporary Art of Trento and Rovereto, Trento, Italy, 1962.
- Homage to Galileo, sculpture, Bo Palace, University of Padua, 1964.
- Panel of Saint'Anthony and Panel of the Virgin Mary, enamel panel, design by the painter Pino Casarini, Chiesa del Sacro Cuore, Abano Terme (Padua), 1964.
- Bull, Musei Civici di Padova, Padua, 1966.
- Seagulls with sun, enamel panel, Palazzo della Civiltà del Lavoro, Rome, 1977.

== Awards ==
- 1935: Brussels International Exposition, silver medal
- 1936: VI Milan Triennale, gold medal
- 1940: VII Milan Triennale, Grand Prix from the Presidency of the Council
- 1947: VIII Milan Triennale, gold medal
- 1951: IX Milan Triennale, gold medal

== Main exhibitions ==
- Venice Biennale, 15 participations from 1934 to 1970.
- Milan Triennale, 10 participations from 1936 to 1968.
- Italy at work, Brooklyn Museum, New York, 1950.
- Homage to Manhattan, Enamels by Paolo De Poli, Museum of Contemporary Crafts, New York, 1967.
- Homage to Paolo De Poli, Museo della Scienza e della Tecnologia, Milan, 1972.
- L'arte dello smalto: Paolo De Poli, Palazzo della Ragione, Padua, 1984.
- 8e Biennale Internationale de l'émail, Musée des Beaux-Arts de Limoges, Limoges, 1986.
- The Italian metamorphosis, 1943–1968, Solomon R. Guggenheim Museum, 1994, Triennale di Milano, 1995 and Kunstmuseum Wolfsburg, 1995.
- The magnificent obsession , Museum of Modern and Contemporary Art of Trento and Rovereto, Trento, Italy, 2012–2013.

== Bibliography ==
- Gio Ponti, De Poli: Smalti Enamels Emaux Emaile Esmaltes, Guarnati, Milano,1958.
- Pier Luigi Fantelli, L'arte dello smalto: Paolo De Poli, Arte Grafica Bolzonella, Padova, 1984.
- Jean-Marc Ferrer, Véronique Notin, L'art de l'émail à Limoges, Culture et patrimoine en Limousin, Limoges, 2005.
- AA.VV., Lo stile nella casa e nell'arredamento, N. 17, maggio 1942, Garzanti, Milano, 1942.
- Paolo Piccione, Gio Ponti. Le navi: il progetto degli interni navali 1948–1953, Idearte, Viareggio, 2007 (ISBN 978-8888033570).
- Valeria Cafà, Paolo De Poli (1905–1996), maestro dello smalto a gran fuoco, AIS/Design Storia e Ricerche, n. 4, novembre 2014 (in Italian)
- Alberto Bassi and Serena Maffioletti, Paolo De Poli artigiano, imprenditore, designer, Il Poligrafo, Padova, 2017 (ISBN 978-88-9387-048-1).
- Alberto Bassi and Valeria Cafà, Paolo De Poli e Gio Ponti: l’artigiano-designer e l’architetto, Universalia, Pordenone, 2019 (ISBN 978-88-941359-3-0). (in Italian)
