= 1940 in Italian television =

This is a list of Italian television related events from 1940

== Events ==
In the early months of 1940, while in France, Germany and Great Britain television experiments were suspended due to the war, Italy, still neutral, was the only European country to have regular broadcasts. The new medium spreads among the Fascist hierarchs; a television set is also placed in the study of Pope Pius XII.

- 25 February: an early Italian TV drama, Ho scritto un bel soggetto, written by Vincenzo Rovi (brother of Achille Campanile) and directed by Rodolfo Morandi (later, active at RAI until the Seventies), is broadcast. Rovi had already realized a script for television (Gideon's misfortunes), inspired by slapstick comedies and directed by Victor De Santis.
- 12-28 April: in Milan, during the XXI trade fair, experimental daily broadcasts are carried out from the Torre Branca, for a total of one hour a day. The Corriere della Sera announces the imminent start of a regular TV service also in the Lombard capital.
- 31 May: in Rome and Milan, television broadcasts are suspended to avoid interferences with radio communications at airports.
- 10 June: Italy's entry into the Second World War leads to the definitive closure of broadcasts. During the conflict, EIAR's television equipment was looted by the Germans and was dispersed.
