= Piero Fornasetti =

Italian artist and designer (1913–1988)

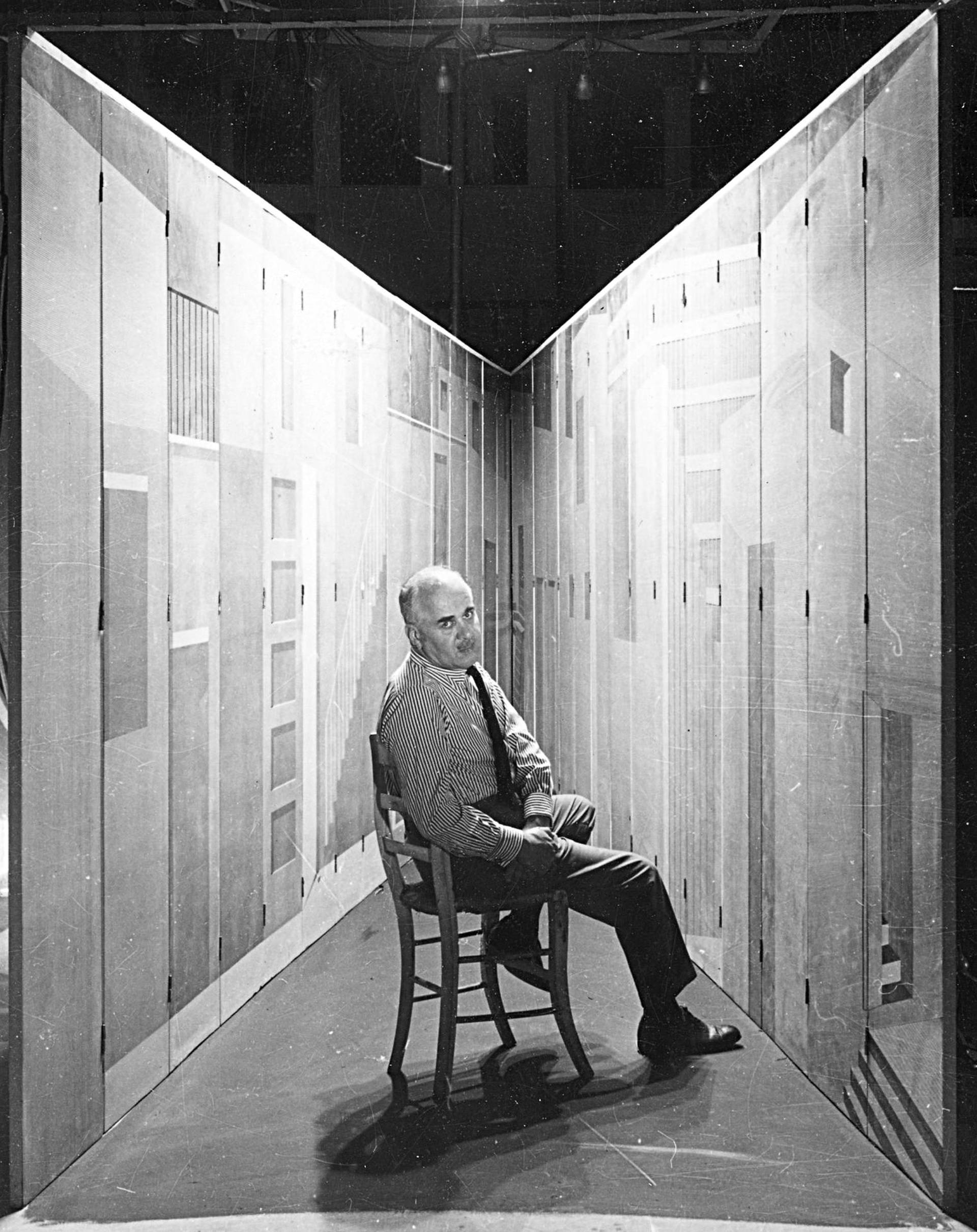
- Piero Fornasetti inside the Stanza Metafisica, one of his creations
- Born: 10 November 1913; Milan
- Died: 15 October 1988 (aged 74); Milan
- Occupations: Designer, artist
- Known for: Design
- Notable work: Stanza metafisica, Tema e variazioni series

Piero Fornasetti (Milan, 10 November 1913 – Milan, 15 October 1988) was an Italian artist and designer, who produced more than 11,000 works over his lifetime in painting, sculpting, interior decoration, and engraving.

== Biography ==
Piero Fornasetti was born in 1913 into a well-off middle-class family in Milan. A multifaceted figure in the Italian art scene of the twentieth century, Fornasetti was active as a designer, decorator, painter, curator and printer. His works - produced in series but in limited numbers – characterise his eclecticism within the Italian culture of design. During his artistic career, he created over 13,000 works, including a vast production of 20th century objects and furniture, especially in terms of diversity of decorations. Art critic and collector Patrick Mauriès said:

"It's rare to see such happiness in the act of making and producing, such a sweeping vision, free of any shadow of conflict in the moment of creation: a serene epiphany, an outpouring of inventions."

— Patrick Mauriès

In the 1940s in Milan Fornasetti founded the design and decorative arts atelier that bears his name, Fornasetti, which, under the artistic direction of his son Barnaba Fornasetti, has become known throughout the world. One decisive factor in starting this activity was meeting Gio Ponti, who pushed him to develop his intuition: to produce everyday objects enriched by the kind of decoration that would bring art into ordinary people's homes. This was the origin of the Fornasetti atelier, an example of the principle of "practical madness", where creativity is in perfect harmony with the utility of the object. Then as now, porcelain items, furniture and furnishing accessories represented the heart of Fornasetti's production.

The choice to work with everyday objects is not accidental. Fornasetti constantly sought reproducibility in series in his works, explaining this choice in terms of democratic and technical principles.

It has always been my notion not to make one-off pieces, but series of items.

— Piero Fornasetti

Even in this climate of seriality, the theme of "variations" is central to the artist's activity, reaching its greatest importance in the Tema e Variazioni series. These are the works inspired by the face of Lina Cavalieri, Piero Fornasetti's long-term muse. To date there are over four hundred variations, extended and expanded by the work of the Fornasetti atelier.

Fornasetti's work straddles different media, from furniture to paintings by way of tapestries and fashion, applied to a diverse variety of surfaces but maintaining a particularly coherent stylistic code. This eclecticism gained admirers of equally diverse origins: Pablo Neruda defined him as "a magician of precious and precise magic", while Bruno Munari affirmed that "Fornasetti can only be measured by the yardstick of Fornasetti", affectionately seeking to underline his artistic uniqueness.

== Childhood and education ==
Piero Fornasetti spent his childhood in the apartment building built by his father Pietro, in the Città Studi district, where at the time the city ended and the fields began. The first child in a wealthy bourgeois family, he found himself facing a seemingly predetermined future: his father, an entrepreneur, had decided that Piero would follow in his footsteps, taking on the family business. Contrary to family expectations, Piero displayed an innate artistic inclination. Of this period he would say:

I will never forget the thrill when, as a boy, one summer morning on the lake, for the first time my pen began to trace the outline of a leg, then a body, then a face. I was astonished, ecstatic and in awe of this miracle, and am still always amazed every time at this blossoming of the image I have inside me, emerging all by itself from the page...

Together with his penchant for drawing, Fornasetti also soon revealed his tough, determined character, demonstrating his resolve to pursue his aspiration. In 1932 he enrolled at the Brera Academy but was expelled two years later for insubordination. He then moved on to the Higher School of Applied Arts in Industry at the Castello Sforzesco, also in Milan, where he completed his schooling.

== The Thirties: the art printworks ==
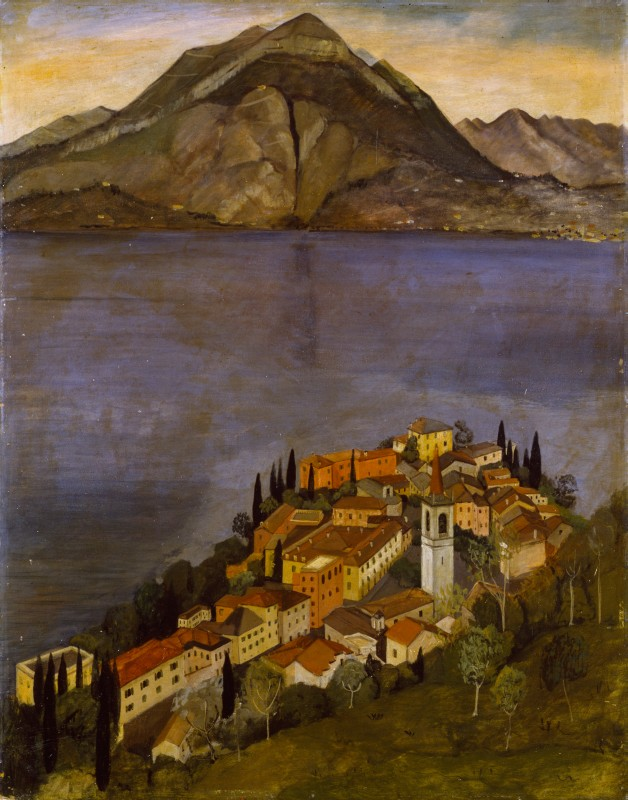
Varenna dal Castello di Vezio, Milano, Art collection of Fondazione Cariplo.

In the early Thirties, Piero began a phase of studying engraving and printing techniques. This constant practice allowed him to work with various artists of the time, printing artist's books and lithographs for them. From Alberto Savinio to Fabrizio Clerici, by way of Giorgio de Chirico, Massimo Campigli, Lucio Fontana, Michele Cascella, Eugene Berman, Raffaele Carrieri and Carlo Bo: the Fornasetti Art Printshop became a benchmark for many artists of his generation. "He was the first to print De Chirico lithographs in Milan, some considerable time ago", wrote Raffaele Carrieri in Epoca in 1978.

Through constant experimentation in the field of printing, Fornasetti was able to obtain unique graphic effects on silk scarves. In 1940 he proposed a series of them at the VII Triennale di Milano, which was rejected because it was off-topic. The proposal, however, earned him the attention of Gio Ponti, with whom years later he would enter into a very close creative partnership. The two of them were aligned not only on the definition and importance of decoration and the cultural heritage that it implies, but also on the whole notion of architecture, the relationship between man and his environment.

== The Forties: the War and working with Gio Ponti ==
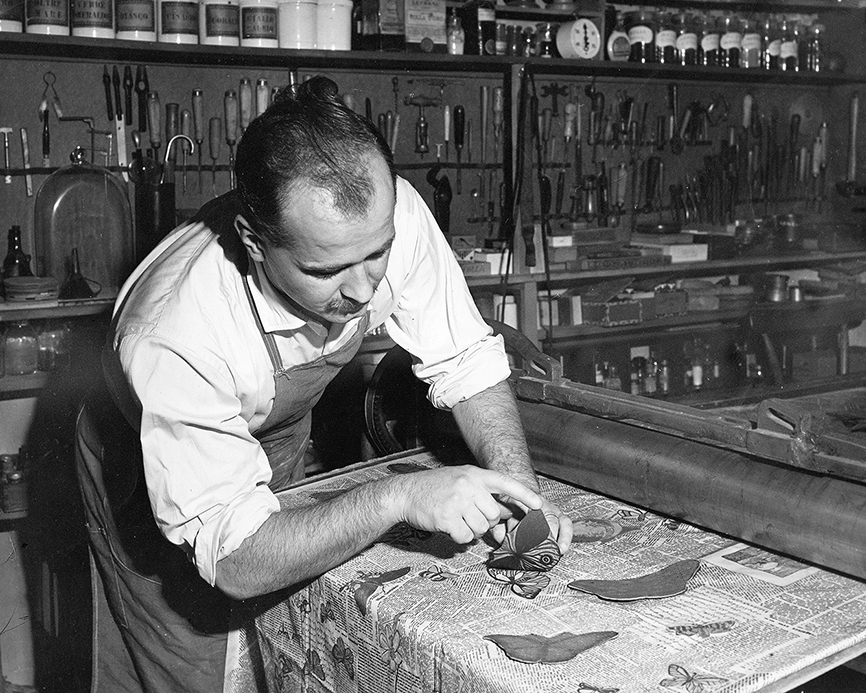
Fornasetti al lavoro nel suo atelier, Milano

Thanks to the experience he had acquired and his passion for printing, from the 1940s onwards Piero created a series of limited edition graphic works. Calendars, gifts, advertising images, theatre programs, posters and magazine covers. Editorial concepts designed and produced on commission or for pleasure, expressing in various forms his conception of formal elegance and his vision of the world.

In this period (along with Filiberto Sbardella, Aligi Sassu, and others) he produced various sketches and drawings for the Esino Lario School of Tapestries. From 1939 he began to publish his works in the design and architecture magazine Domus, edited at the time by Gio Ponti. From 1940 to 1942 he designed almanacs on the commission of Gio Ponti himself. The first three almanacs, small publications designed and printed using previously unpublished themes, which started life as Christmas gifts, would inspire a longer series beginning immediately after the war and ending in 1950.

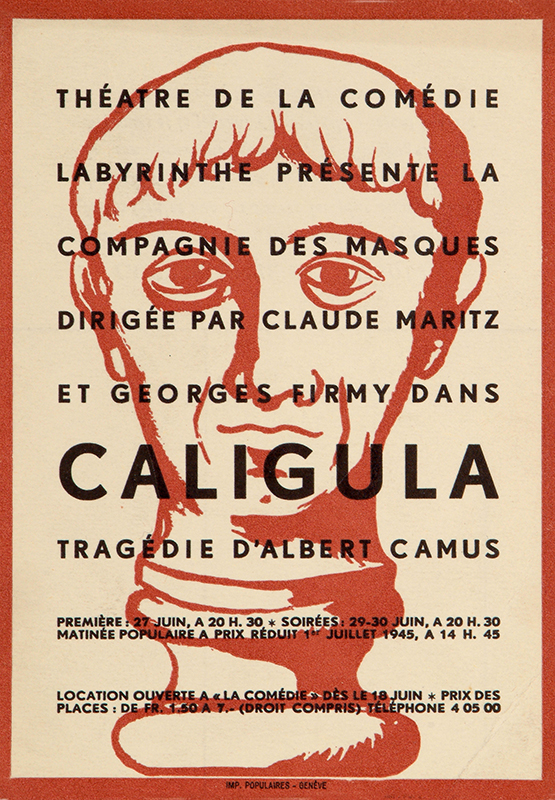
Poster of the Caligula tragedy drawn by Fornasetti

On paper, ideas were born, themes emerged, and characters were defined for a variety of subjects. At the origin of Fornasetti's success, and its furniture and objects, was precisely that production of graphic images and drawings that represent its stylistic code.

Called up on the outbreak of war, Piero initially managed to stay in Milan by procuring the job of decorating the Sant'Ambrogio barracks. Later, in 1943, he took refuge in Switzerland, where he continued his artistic research and produced posters and lithographs for theatrical events and magazines. This period represented an unprecedented opportunity for him, during which he created oil portraits, watercolours, drawings in Indian ink, ink and ballpoint pen, devoting himself to the study of the human body, which he would later draw on in his production of decorative graphic arts. During the same period he created the sets and some promotional materials for Albert Camus' Caligula directed by Giorgio Strehler.

This is the period when his relationship with Gio Ponti also became closer. Their work together, which, on his return to Milan, would produce important concepts of interiors and furnishing, design and decoration for houses, apartments, ship cabins or cinema auditoria, was so felicitous that it would eventually induce Gio Ponti to declare:

"If one day they write my life story, they'll have to call one of the chapters 'Passion for Fornasetti'."

— Gio Ponti

== The Fifties: Lina Cavalieri and the "Tema e Variazioni" series ==
With the advent of the Fifties, the creative duo of Ponti and Fornasetti were able to put their point of view into practice: a home interior and furnishing style that they had long been promoting in theory. A method that envisages "the specific functionality of rooms and furniture, the simplicity and sincerity of forms and materials", the worship of sun, air, and light, and unity of aspiration for all social categories."

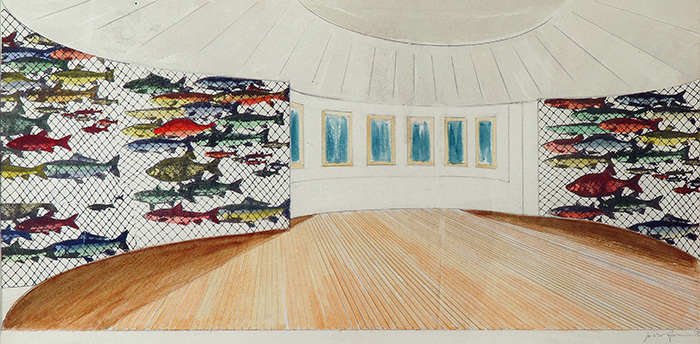
Fornasetti's design for the Andrea Doria ocean liner, 1952

At the beginning of those years the couple designed and decorated the "Architettura" trumeau, exhibited at the IX Triennale in 1951 and then auctioned in 1998 at Christie's for fifteen thousand dollars. A second original from 1951 is currently on display at the Victoria and Albert Museum in London. The "Architettura" trumeau aims to represent the interaction of modern and ancient, rationalism and the Renaissance, architecture and furniture, structure and decoration, and over time has become one of the icons of Fornasetti's work during the interwar years and the economic boom.

Contrasting unused rooms and traditional houses with the reduced living spaces of the modern age, the two furnished and decorated the Sanremo Casino (1950), an entire apartment that became famous as a symbol of their style, the private home Casa Lucano (1951), and the first-class cabins and lounges of ocean liners such as the Andrea Doria (1952).

In 1952 Piero began working on what would later become his most famous and iconic series: "Tema e Variazioni". Starting from a portrait of a woman seen in a magazine from the late nineteenth century, he began a representational study that would accompany him throughout his life. The subject was the face of Lina Cavalieri, an opera singer who lived at the turn of the 19th and 20th centuries and who was celebrated as the most beautiful woman in the world. At that time, Lina Cavalieri represented an archetype of enigmatic, classical beauty that Fornasetti reinterpreted by means of over 400 "variations". Alluring, mysterious, amazed, seductive, with a mustache, glasses, crown or balaclava: over time the face of Lina Cavalieri became the emblem of Fornasetti and his art. Thus was born the “Tema e Variazioni” series, which continues today to be reproduced today by his son Barnaba Fornasetti on a series of everyday objects, not only porcelain, but also furniture and accessories, in new variations. The series has won over a large audience of writers and intellectuals: Alberto Moravia dedicated a text to the infinite variations of Lina Cavalieri's face, while in 1971 Henry Miller chose one of the decorations of the series on the cover of his autobiography "My Life and Times".

Tema e Variazioni decorative plates
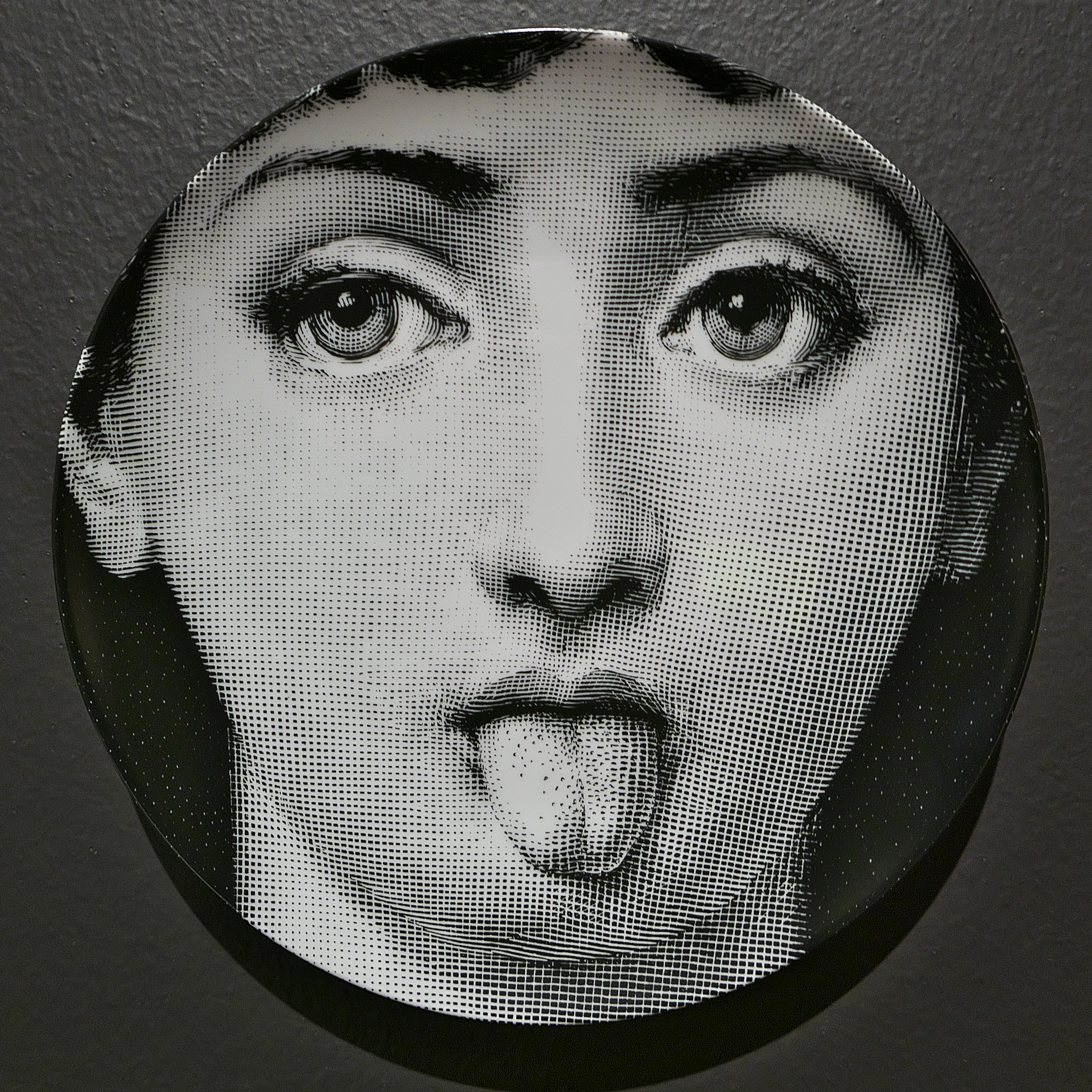
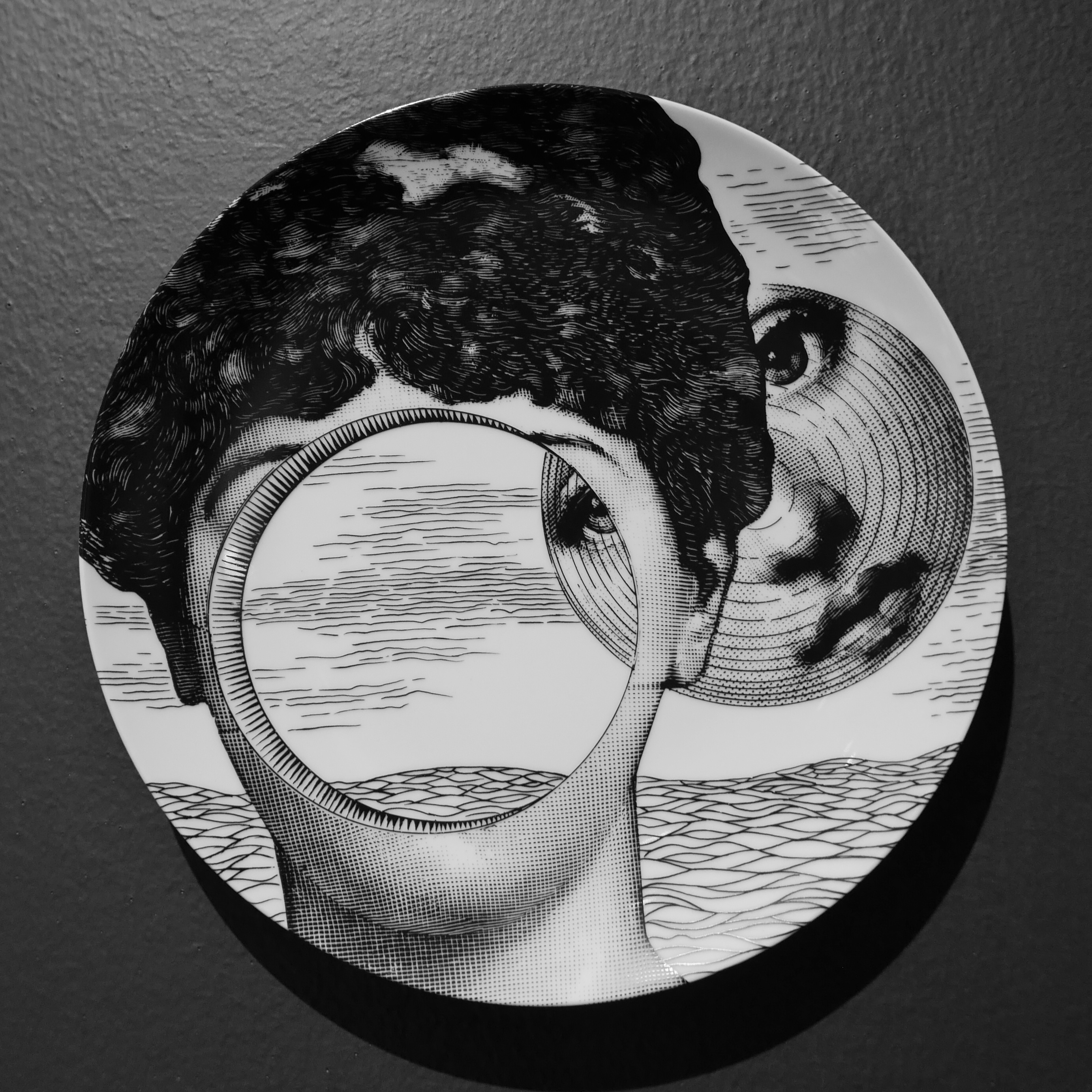
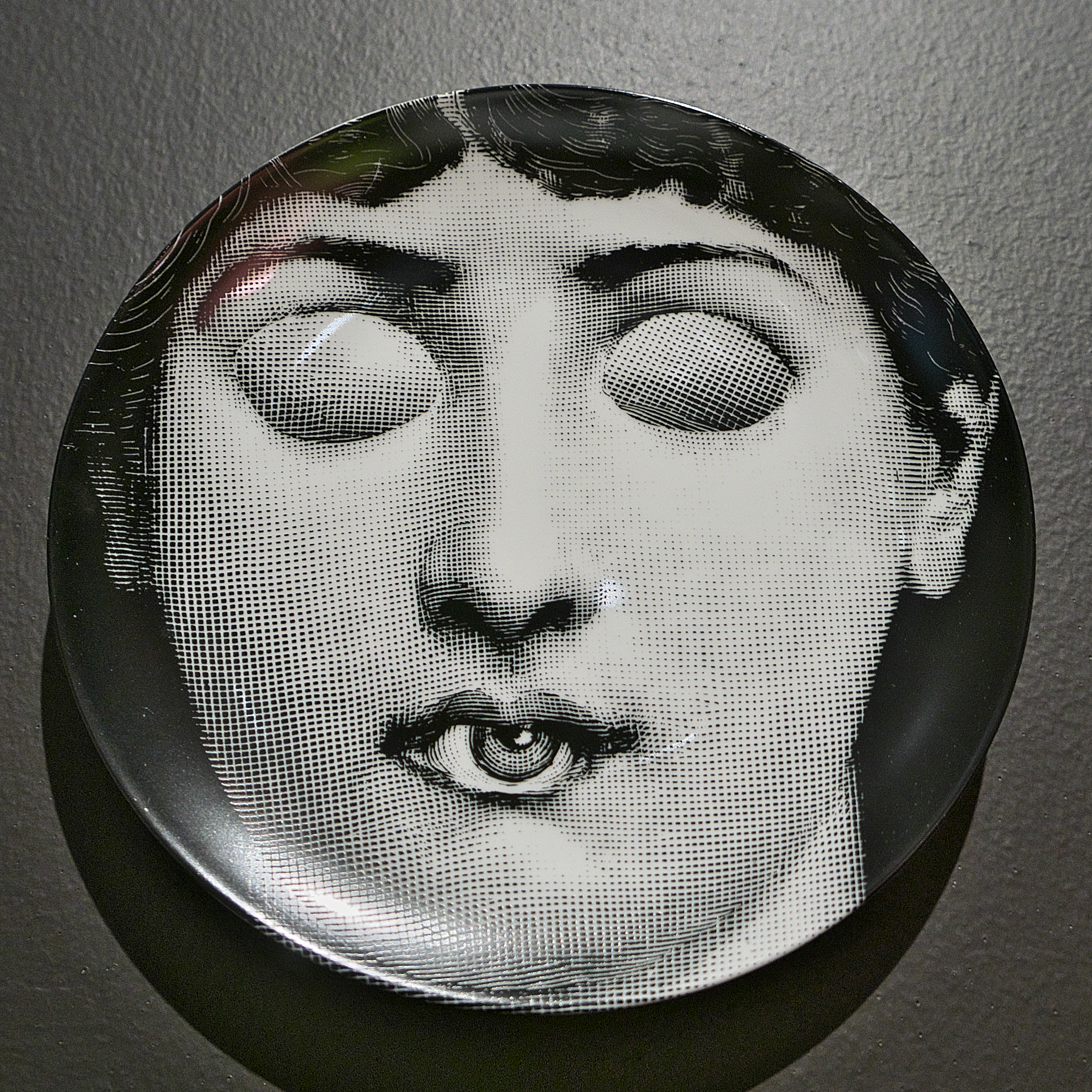

In 2016, the first 100 illustrations from the series were collected in a prestigious, completely handmade, limited edition volume. During the same year, the series made its entrance to the world of theatre, becoming part of the set of "Don Giovanni", the Mozart opera presented and produced by Fornasetti.

Over the same period, in parallel with the development of his personal iconography applied to everyday objects, Fornasetti's artistic evolution progressed. 1958 saw the creation of "Stanza metafisica" ("Metaphysical Room"), a work composed of thirty-two hinged, wheelless doors, designed to form a congenial space for meditation, an early example of an artistic installation, first presented at the exhibition at the Tea Centre in London.

== The Sixties and Seventies: a new cultural climate ==
At the end of the sixties, the cultural climate changed. The affirmation of rationalism and function over form seemed to leave little room for the concept of decoration. Fornasetti struggled to align himself with the new logic of the market and industrial production. The difficulties encountered in this period also led to a cooling in relations with Ponti, who reproached Fornasetti for being unable to reinvent himself.

In this same period Piero succeeded in shaping the conceptual side of his approach. In the seventies he opened a space that offered him a way of giving continuity to his work with other instruments: in 1970, together with a group of friends, he ran the Galleria dei Bibliofili, where he exhibited both his own work and that of contemporary artists. Piero began drawing again. The figures, heads, faces, and bodies made of bottles or fruits remained to herald his new pictorial style, alongside abstract compositions that highlighted an unexpected fascination for layers, interactions of colour and different techniques.

== The Eighties: rediscovery and the London gallery "Themes and Variations" ==
In 1984 the "Themes & Variations" gallery opened in London, on the initiative of Liliane Fawcett and Giuliana Medda, which also revived interest in Fornasetti's work overseas, where he was already known. His oeuvre began to be rediscovered beyond the ideological contrasts of form/function and ornament/utility, and in 1987 Piero collaborated with Patrick Mauriés on the first monograph of his work, accompanied by an introduction by Ettore Sottsass. Fornasetti died in 1988 during a minor operation in hospital and the book was published posthumously. After Piero's death in October 1988, his son Barnaba Fornasetti kept a part of his father's activity going.

Ettore Sottsass on Fornasetti

"I believe that Fornasetti one day, when he was young, had an incredible vision. I do not know if it was during the day or at night, but he must have seen, all of a sudden, the whole world, all the deposits of figures and memories, being blown to pieces (...). He seems to have decided that if there was nothing left on the ground but a layer of debris and broken stuff, and if that was the only floor on which to walk, if he was obliged to walk on the soft ground of a sort of shapeless dump of fragments, shards, and symbols without context, then he, Fornasetti (...) would rebuild the world. (…) I believe that for Fornasetti it was a bit like this: that the set of people, animals, stones, mountains, trees, skies, rains, monuments, cemeteries, and other objects, which in our minds is organised into what we call the world, for him it had really all been blown to pieces. (…) Possessed of this immense baggage of figures and pieces of well-chosen, rigorously controlled and reorganised metaphors, in the end Fornasetti began to (...) draw this great, vast, poetic, infinite new metaphor."

— Ettore Sottsass, Ettore Sottsass, in Patrick Mauriès, "Fornasetti. Practical Madness", Thames and Hudson Ltd, 1991

== The Fornasetti style ==
"I also consider myself the inventor of the tray, because at a certain point in our civilisation people no longer knew how to hand over a glass, a message or a poem. I was born into a family with the worst kind of good taste, and I make terrible good taste the key to the liberation of the imagination." (Piero Fornasetti, "Certain screens have been designed twice")

Following the rediscovery of Italian classicism promoted by the Novecento Italiano artistic movement of the time, Fornasetti's work was inspired on the one hand by Piero della Francesca, Giotto, and Renaissance frescoes, and on the other by metaphysical painting. These two worlds come together in Fornasetti through the virtuosity that distinguished his artistic activity.

Fornasetti's style is full of theatricality, an invitation to the imagination, trying to push those who observe his objects, as well as those who use them, to take a journey of the mind.

In this sense he was inspired by the words of Curzio Malaparte, who he knew through Giò Ponti, and whom he quoted saying: "The important thing is to travel, to move, to meet people, to see things, but above all to do so with no predetermined plan ... the important thing is not knowing how to create, invent, write, but knowing how to deduce, that is, knowing how to start from one thing, anything, and derive from it a multitude of others... Basically, nothing is invented, it is only deduced."

The medium of design represented a kind of notepad for him, useful for not forgetting a suggestion. Suggestions that usually arose either from the casual juxtaposition of two contradictory orders of reality, or from reflections on surrealism and Giorgio de Chirico's metaphysical painting.

Despite the success of the furniture and ceramics he created from the fifties, it was in drawing that Fornasetti believed he could make an innovative impact. The artist's distinctive style was very much of its time, and followed the natural movement of the hand, fixing the idea with simplicity, with immediacy. This conception can be linked to the influence of Picasso's Ingres period.

For Fornasetti the legacy of the great Italian tradition lay precisely in drawing, in the daily practice of sketching and copying. Rigour and simplicity of style were the fundamental antidote against the narcissism of the end of the 19th century that he detested. The design of objects, therefore, represents only one stage of his artistic journey.

== Works (partial) ==
Fornasetti's work was particularly prolific, consisting of tens of thousands of items. A partial list would include the following:

- Curved glass cabinet, designed by Gio Ponti and produced by Fontana Arte, 1939–40
- All’insegna delle dodici mani, commissioned by Gio Ponti, 1940
- Almanac for 1941, commissioned by Gio Ponti, 1941
- Il lunario del Sole, commissioned by Gio Ponti, 1942
- Frescoes of Palazzo del Bo, Padua, 1942
- Decorative motifs commissioned by Gio Ponti, VIII Triennale di Milano, Milan, 1947
- Interior of the Sanremo casino, 1950
- Farfalle chair and desk, decorated to a design by Gio Ponti, 1950, Vitra Design Museum
- Interior of the "Dulciora" pastry shop in Milan, 1950
- Sole lacquered chair, 1950. The chair, with its very geometric and stylised shape, is available in only one color: yellow in strong contrast with the black legs.
- Leopardo chest of drawers and Palladiana chest of drawers, early 1950s
- Interiors of "Casa Lucano", 1951, one of the first examples of complete interior design
- Architettura trumeau, designed with Gio Ponti, 1951, Victoria & Albert Museum
- Il pranzo in piedi, 1951, Triennale Design Museum
- Interior of the ocean liner "Andrea Doria", 1952
- Interior of the ocean liner "Conte Grande".
- Tema e Variazioni plate series, 1952 – 1953
- Adamo ed Eva plate set, 1954, Houston Museum of Fine Arts, Houston
- Stanza metafisica (Metaphysical Room), 1958

== Bibliography ==
- "The European" no. 6 – December 2007 – special issue for Triennale Design Museum – RCS Periodici spa
- Fornasetti, designer de la fantaisie, Patrick Mauriès, Thames & Hudson, 2006
- Fornasetti: The Complete Universe, by Mariuccia Casadio, Barnaba Fornasetti and Andrea Branzi, Rizzoli, 2010, ISBN 0847835340
