= Concattedrale Gran Madre di Dio =

Italian cathedral

Religion
- Affiliation: Roman Catholic

Location
- Location: Taranto
- Country: Italy
- Interactive map of Concattedrale Gran Madre di Dio
- Coordinates: 40.46186°N 17.27037°E

The Concattedrale Gran Madre di Dio is a Roman Catholic co-cathedral in Taranto, Italy. Built between 1967 and 1970, it is notable for its modern architectural style.

== History ==
The cathedral was designed by Italian architect Giovanni "Gio" Ponti at the direction of Archbishop Guglielmo Motolese. The Concattedrale was to be built in the rapidly-developing Città Nuova neighborhood of Taranto and was meant to support the older Taranto Cathedral.

Planning for the structure began in 1964, with construction continuing from 1967 until December 1970.

== Description ==
The design of the cathedral is closely linked to Taranto's position on the Mediterranean Sea. There are three reflecting pools in front of the building that symbolize the ocean and the façade is designed to look like a sail. The floor inside the cathedral is sea foam green, as are the accents in the nave.

The façade is 87 meters long and 35 meters tall. It is composed of two concrete walls spaced a meter apart with geometric holes cut into them, leaving a gothic outline.

== Gallery ==
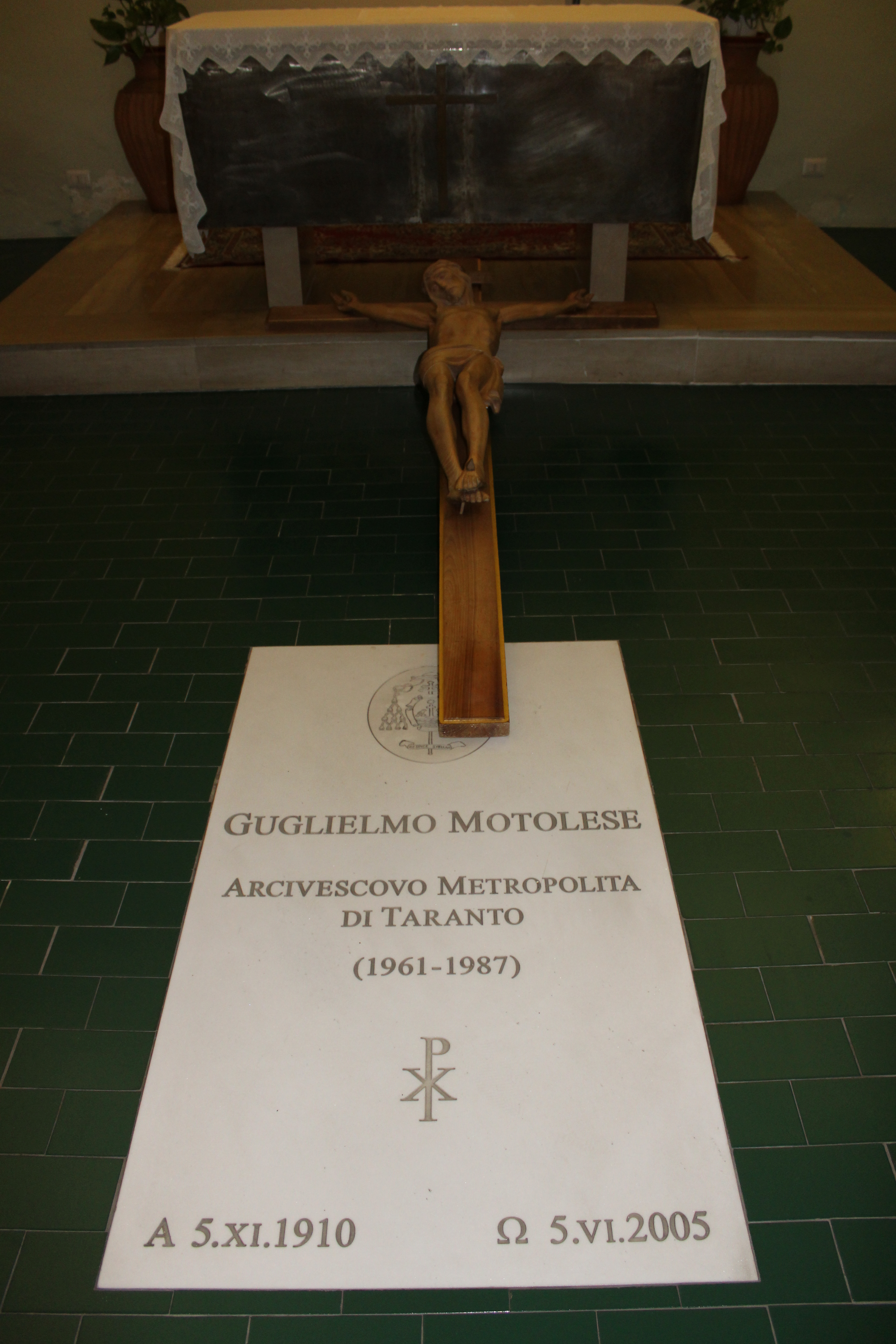
Grave of Archbishop Guglielmo Motolese
