= Pino Casarini =

Italian painter (1897–1972)

Pino Casarini (June 7, 1897, Verona — April 1, 1972, Verona) was an Italian painter.

One of the few major Italian fresco painters in the 20th century. Also worked as illustrator, set designer (for the Arena of Verona), stained glass window maker and sculptor.

His frescos and other works can be found in the University of Padua (Palazzo del Bo), the City Hall of Trent, Palazzo Reale in Bolzano, and in many buildings in Verona, including Museo di Castelvecchio, INA palace, Hotel Due Torri di Verona, Sacile, Nave, Vittorio Veneto, Cordovado, Vicenza, Agnedo, Venice. He created the portals of the church in Cordovado (PN) and of the Duomo in Sacile, and a bas-relief for the Aviation Academy in Pozzuoli.

National “Premio Casarini” Competition is sponsored by the Hotel Due Torri in Verona.

"La Galleria d'Arte Moderna Pino Casarini" is located in Sacile, Piazza Duomo.
