= Torre Branca =

Panoramic tower by Giò Ponti in Milan

Coordinates: 45°28′24″N 9°10′22″E

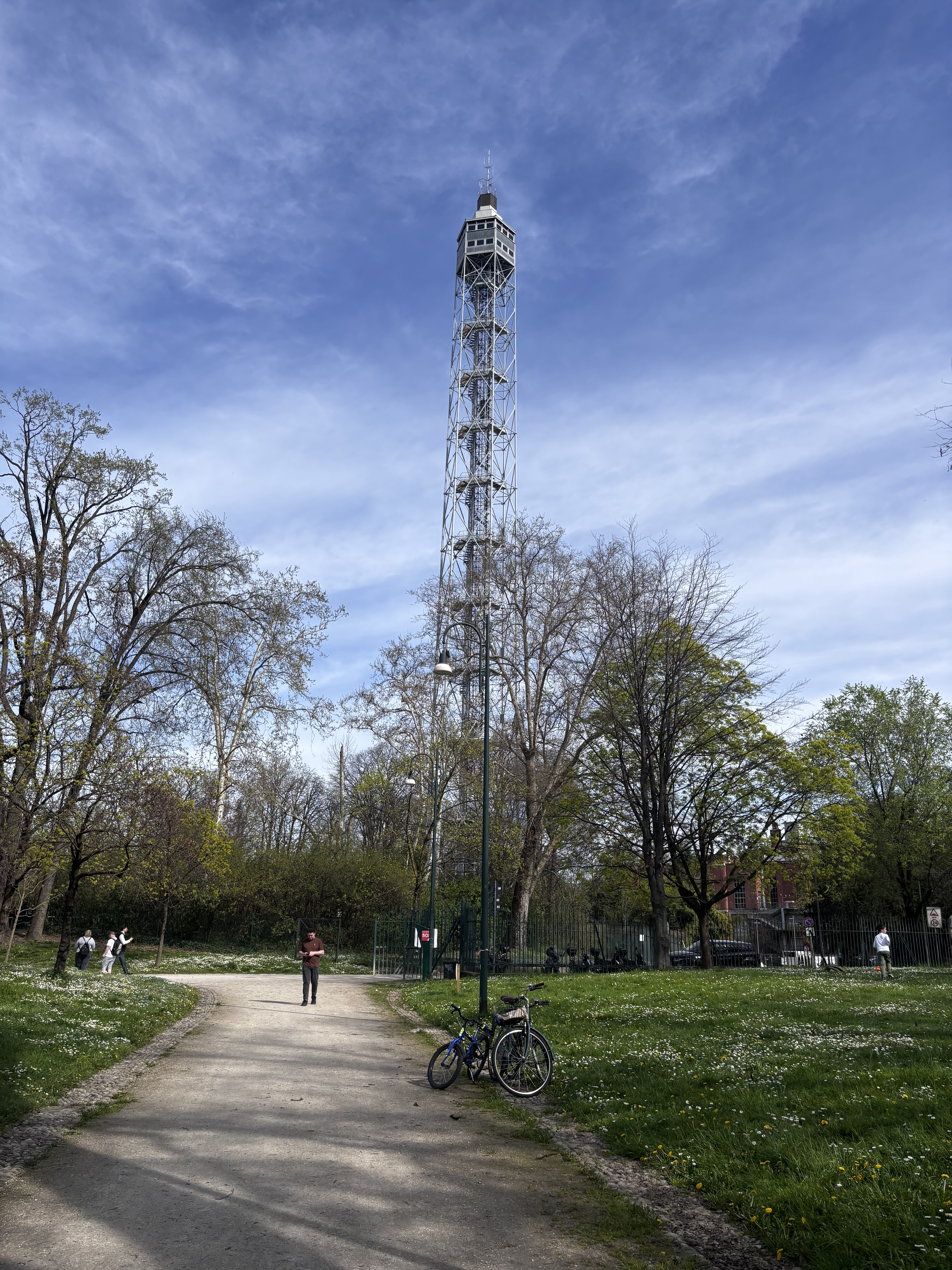
The Torre Branca in 2025

Torre Branca ("Branca Tower") is a steel-frame panoramic tower designed by architect Giò Ponti in 1933, located in Parco Sempione, the main city park of Milan, Italy. The top of the tower is a panoramic point whose view, on a clear day, may encompass the Milan cityline as well as the Alps, the Apennines, and part of the Po Valley.

== History ==
The tower was designed by architect Gio Ponti, and with the help of engineers Cesare Chiodi and Ettore Ferrari. It was inaugurated in 1933, in the Fascist era during the 5th edition of the Milan Triennial, at the request of Benito Mussolini who wanted a tower similar to the Eiffel Tower in Milan. It was originally named "Torre Littoria" after fascio littorio, i.e. the fasces. At the time of its construction, a decree was instituted that forbid any new buildings to exceed the height of the Maddonina atop the duomo, and thus the tower's height was limited to 108.6m. The tower took 68 days to build. The top of the tower was fitted with a 5000 watt bulb, which, in 1939, was substituted by the EIAR for a radio antenna to transmit for the RAI stations. After World War II it was renamed "Torre del Parco" ("park tower"). In 1972, access to the top of the tower was closed as the structure needed restoring. It was restored and reopened to the public in 2002 by the Fratelli Branca liquor company, and thus renamed Torre Branca. The tower previously hosted a bar/restaurant at the top, however this was closed due to health and safety concerns and not reopened after the restoration. Currently, there is a restaurant and club located at the base of the tower.
