= Bo Palace =

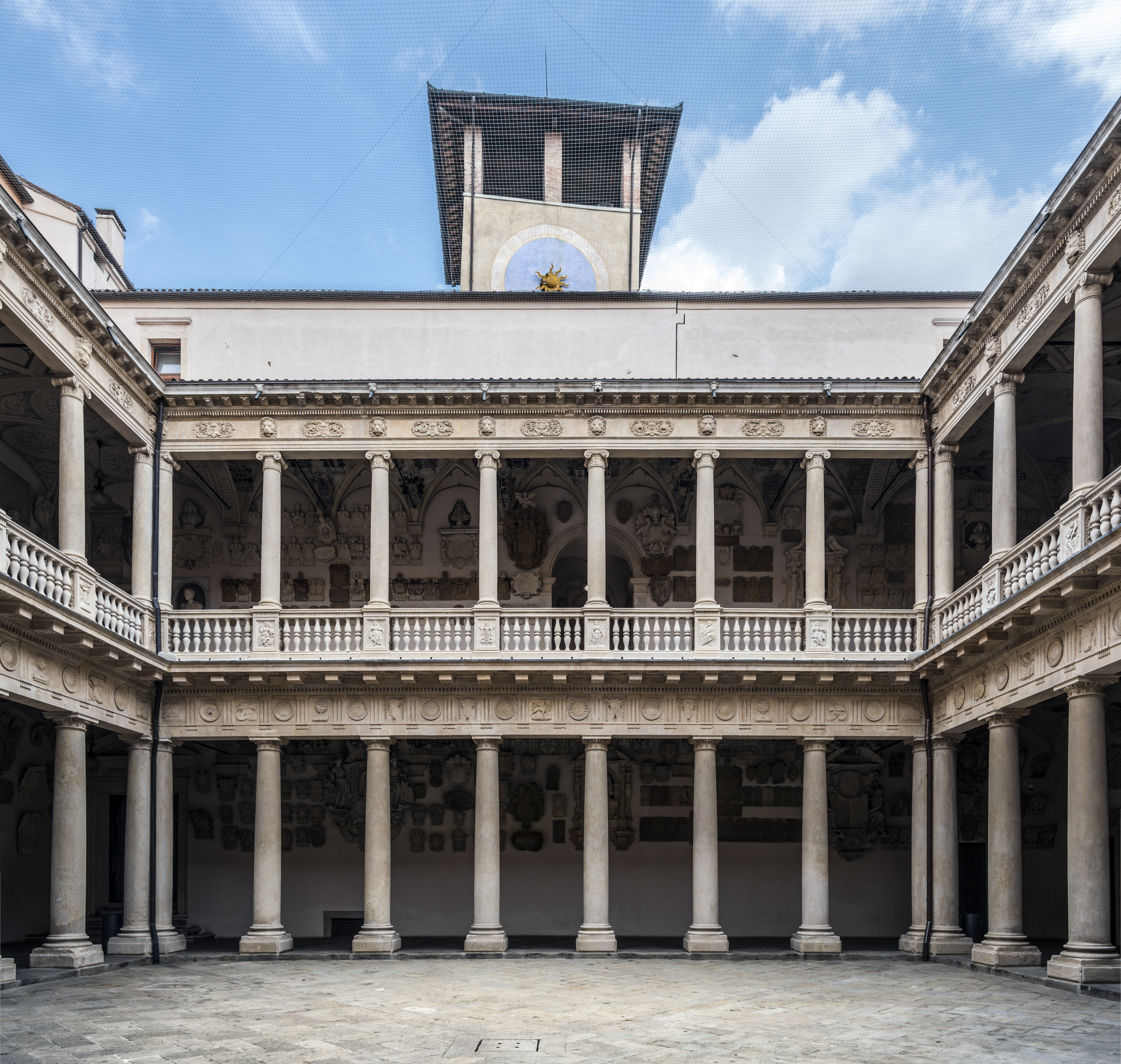

General information
- Status: In use
- Architectural style: Renaissance style, Rationalism
- Address: Via 8 Febbraio 1848, 2
- Town or city: Padua
- Country: Italy
- Coordinates: 45.4093°N 11.8762°E
- Inaugurated: 16th century
- Landlord: University of Padua

The Bo Palace (Italian: Palazzo del Bo) is the historical seat of University of Padua since 1493, It is still home to the Rectorate and the School of Law. It is also home to the oldest anatomical theatre in the world.

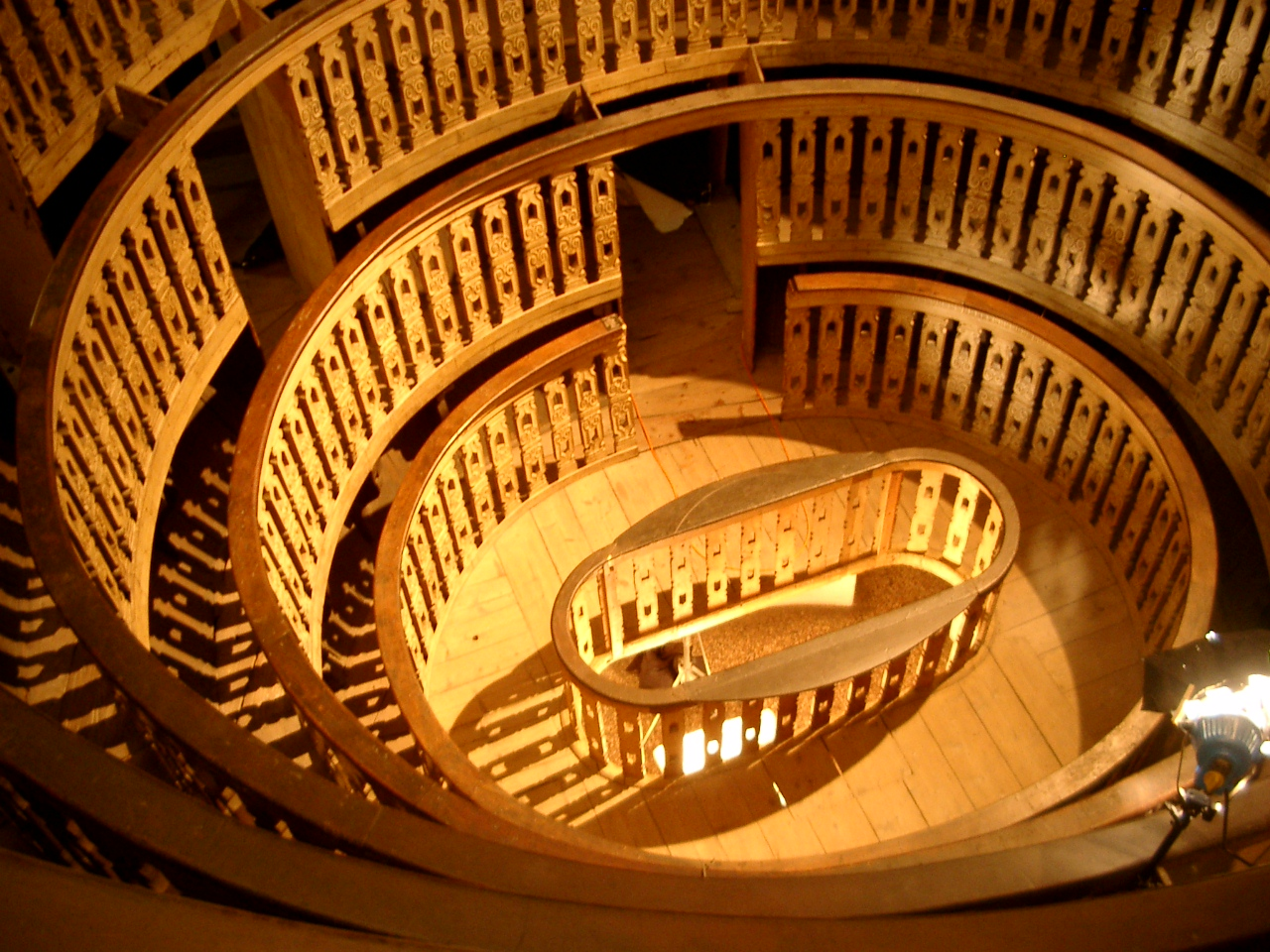
Anatomical Theatre of Padua

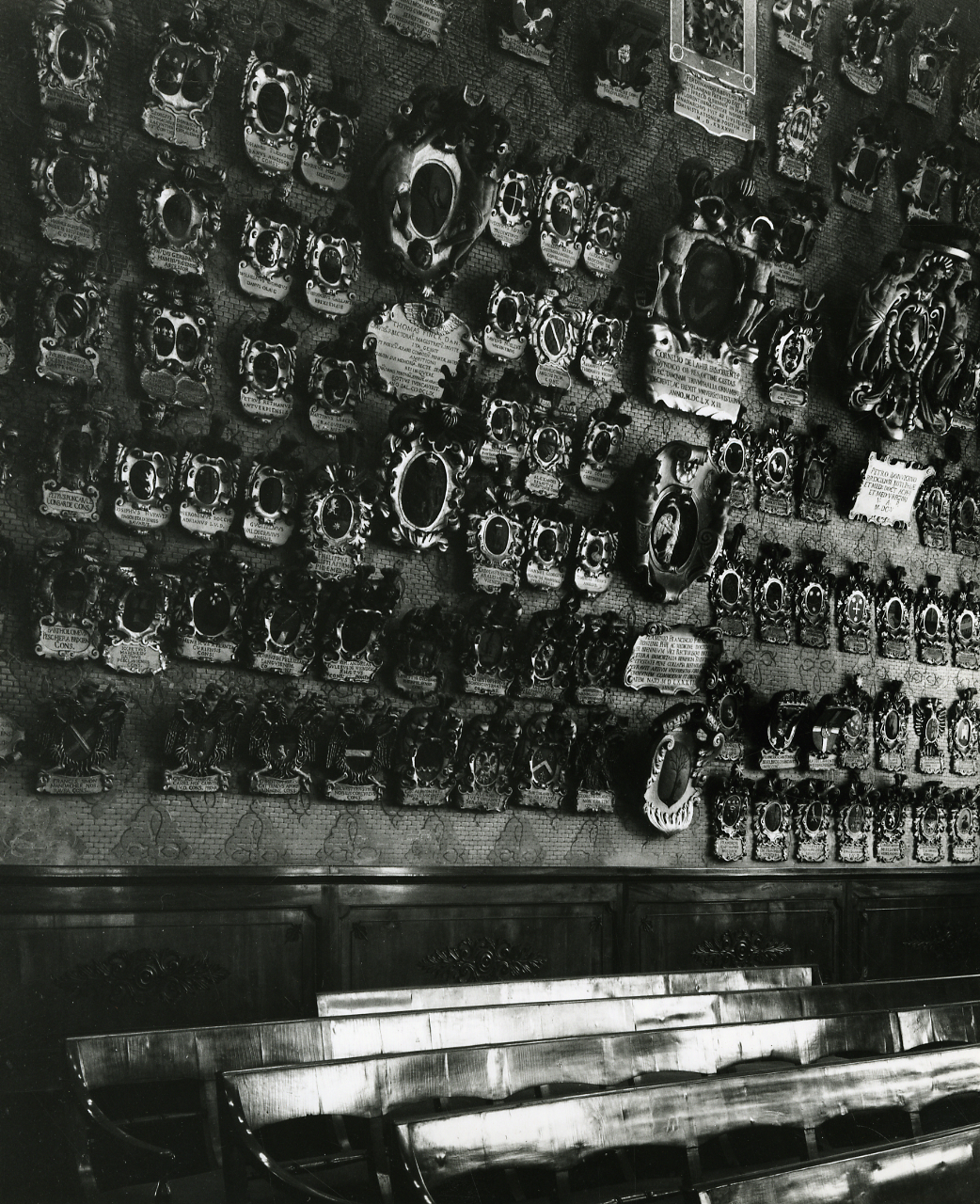
Aula Magna. Photo by Paolo Monti, 1966
