= Listed buildings in Skirpenbeck =

Skirpenbeck is a civil parish in the county of the East Riding of Yorkshire, England. It contains ten listed buildings that are recorded in the National Heritage List for England. Of these, one is listed at Grade II*, the middle of the three grades, and the others are at Grade II, the lowest grade. The parish contains the village of Skirpenbeck and the surrounding area. All the listed buildings are in the village, and consist of a church, houses, cottages and associated structures, a rectory and a telephone kiosk.

== Key ==
Grade	Criteria
II*	Particularly important buildings of more than special interest
II	Buildings of national importance and special interest

== Buildings ==
Name and location	Photograph	Date	Notes	Grade
St Mary's Church; 54.00562°N 0.85748°W		12th century	The church has been altered and extended through the centuries, including a restoration in 1893–94. The tower is built in brick, and the rest of the church is in stone with freestone dressings and a slate roof. The church consists of a nave, a south porch, a chancel with a north vestry, and a west tower. The tower is slim, and has a low stepped plinth, round-headed louvred bell openings, a stepped brick eaves cornice and a pyramidal roof. The south doorway is Norman, and has a round arch with two orders.	II*
The Willows; 54.00313°N 0.86503°W		Mid-18th century	The house is in brick, with a stepped brick eaves cornice, and a double-span pantile roof. There are two storeys and four bays, and a parallel rear range. On the front is a doorway and sash windows, those on the ground floor under slightly cambered brick arches.	II
The Cottage; 54.00378°N 0.86182°W	—	Mid to late 18th century	The cottage is in red brick, with a stepped and dentilled eaves cornice, and a pantile roof with tumbled-in brick to the raised gable on the right. There is a single storey and attics, and three bays. On the front is a gabled timber porch, and top-opening lights under segmental brick arches. Above are two raking roof dormers with top-openings lights.	II
House to the east of The Cottage; 54.00383°N 0.86141°W	—	Late 18th century	The house is in brown brick, with a dentilled brick eaves cornice, and a pantile roof with tumbled-in brick to the raised gables. There are two storeys and three bays. In the centre is a projecting porch and a doorway, and the windows are horizontally sliding sashes under segmental brick arches.	II
Skirpenbeck House; 54.00336°N 0.86322°W		Late 18th century	The house is in brown brick on a plinth, with stone dressings, a floor band, a modillion eaves cornice, and a Westmorland slate roof with raised coped gables on shaped kneelers. There are two storeys, three bays, and a rear wing. The central doorway has fluted pilasters, impost blocks, a fanlight with radial glazing, an open dentilled pediment, and portrait medallions to the frieze and apex, the latter flanked by wheatear festoons. The windows are sashes under slightly cambered gauged brick arches.	II
Cowhouse, Skirpenbeck House; 54.00312°N 0.86269°W	—	Late 18th century	A barn, later a cowhouse, is in red brick, with cogged eaves, and a pantile roof with stone gable copings and shaped kneelers. There are two storeys and five bays, and a single-storey, single bay link to the north. On the main block is a doorway, casement windows and vents, and on the link is a round-arched window.	II
Dovecote range, Skirpenbeck House; 54.00299°N 0.86273°W	—	c. 1800	The range, consisting of a dovecote, a shelter shed and a cartshed, is in red brick, with dentilled eaves and hipped pantile roofs. The centre has two storeys and one bay, and is flanked by single-storey single-bay wings. In the centre is a basket-arched cart entrance, and above are square openings, ledges and pigeon holes. The roof has a truncated central apex.	II
Stable block, Skirpenbeck House; 54.00325°N 0.86287°W	—	Late 18th to early 19th century	The stable block is in red brick, with dentilled eaves and a hipped pantile roof. There are two storeys and five bays. In the centre is a doorway with an elliptical arch in gauged brick flanked by doors with fanlights under similar arches. On the end bays are horizontally sliding sash windows, and above the central entrance is a Diocletian window flanked by louvred openings with fanlights.	II
The Rectory; 54.00535°N 0.85831°W	—	1841	The rectory is in brown brick, with oversailing eaves and a hipped slate roof. There are two storeys, fronts of three and two bays and a rear wing. In the centre is an open timber porch with a belled roof, and a doorway with a fanlight. The windows are sashes under slightly cambered gauged brick arches.	II
Telephone kiosk 54.00387°N 0.86162°W		1935	The telephone kiosk in Main Street is of the K6 type designed by Giles Gilbert Scott. Constructed in cast iron with a square plan and a dome, it has three unperforated crowns in the top panels.	II
