= Architecture of Chiswick House =

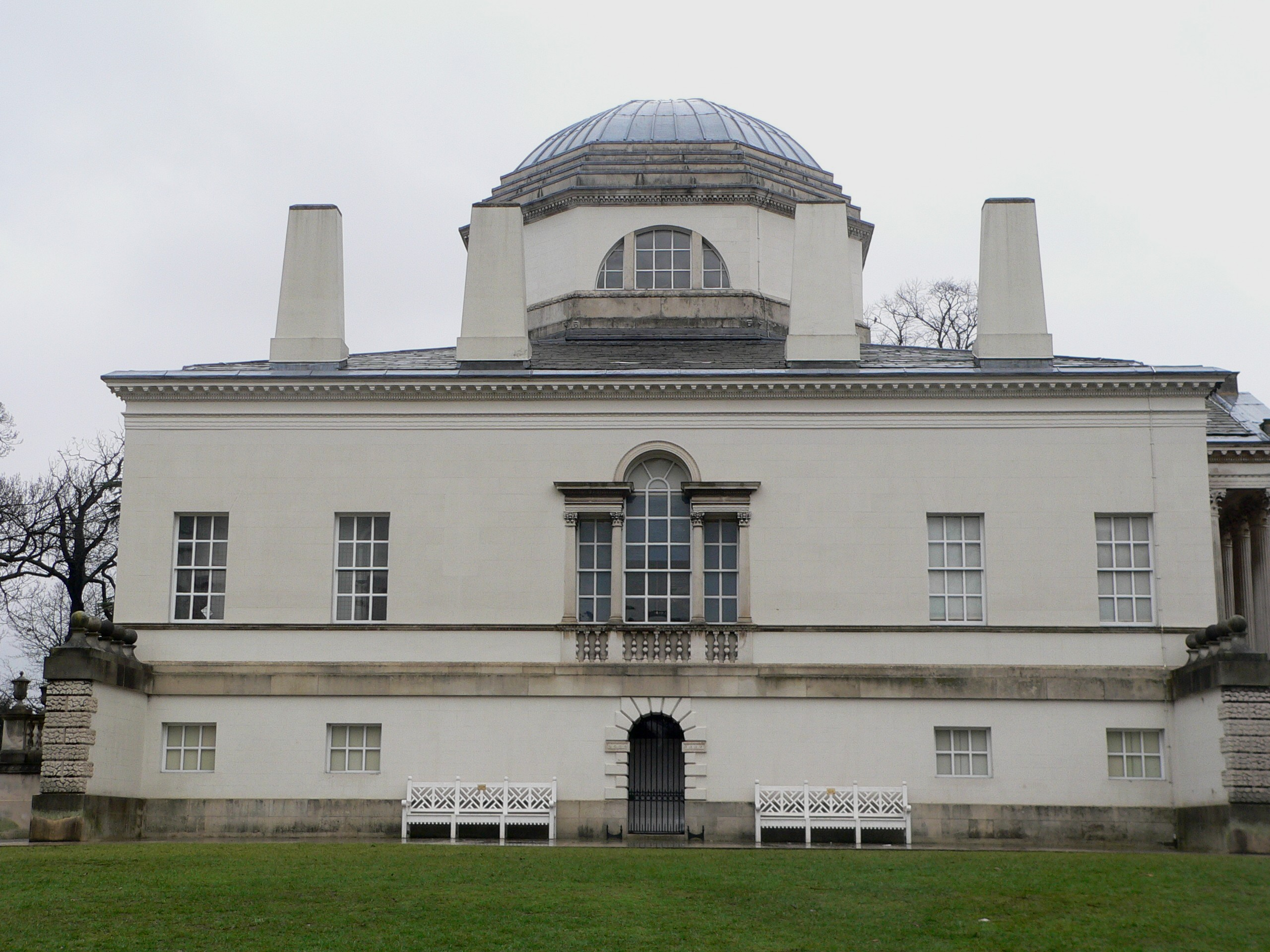
The Villa from the southwest, showing a Venetian window and chimneys disguised as obelisks

Chiswick House is an example of English Palladian Architecture in Burlington Lane, Chiswick, in the London Borough of Hounslow in England. Arguably the finest remaining example of Neo-Palladian architecture in London, the house was designed by Lord Burlington, and built between 1727 and 1729. The architectural historian Richard Hewlings has established that Chiswick House was an attempt by Lord Burlington to create a Roman villa, rather than Renaissance pastiche, situated in a symbolic Roman garden. Chiswick House is inspired in part by several buildings of the 16th-century Italian architects Andrea Palladio (1508–1580) and his assistant Vincenzo Scamozzi (1552–1616). The house is often said to be directly inspired by Palladio's Villa Capra "La Rotonda" near Vicenza, due to the fact that architect Colen Campbell had offered Lord Burlington a design for a villa very closely based on the Villa Capra for his use at Chiswick. However, although still clearly influential, Lord Burlington had rejected this design and it was subsequently used at Mereworth Castle, Kent.

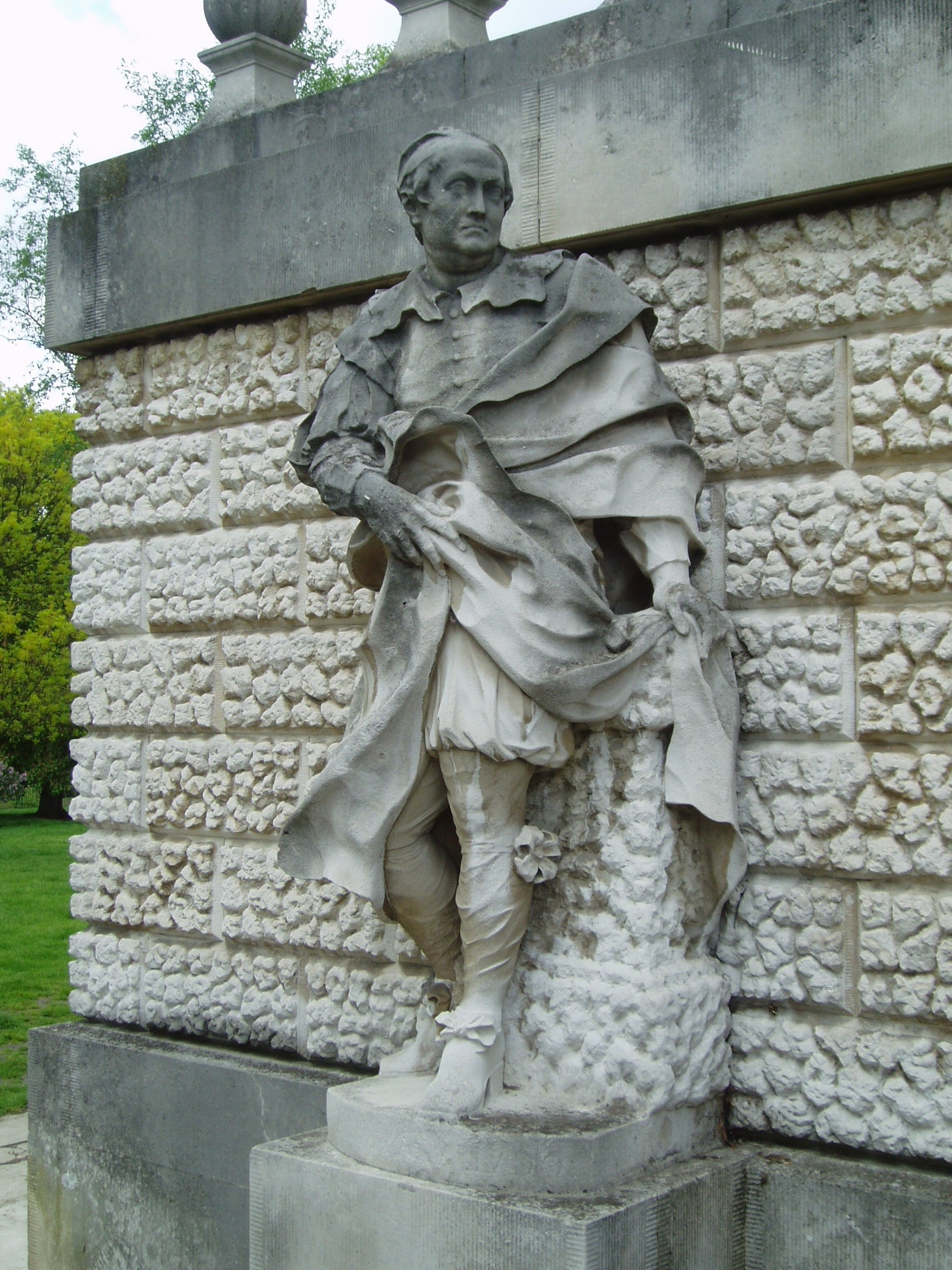
Statue of Andrea Palladio, by Michael Rysbrack, flanking the doorway to the house

The brick-built Villa's facade is faced in Portland stone, with a small amount of stucco. The finely carved Corinthian capitals on the projecting six-column portico at Chiswick, carved by John Boson, are derived from Rome's Temple of Castor and Pollux. The inset door, projecting plinth and 'v'-necked rusticated vermiculation (resembling tufa) were all derived from the base of Trajan's Column. The short sections of crenellated wall with ball finials which extend out either side of the villa were symbolic of medieval (or Roman) fortified town walls and were inspired by their use by Palladio at his church of San Giorgio Maggiore in Venice and by Inigo Jones (1573–1652) (Palladio also produced woodcuts of the Villa Foscari with crenellated sections of walls in his I quattro libri dell'architettura in 1570, yet in reality they were never built). To reinforce this link two full-length statues of Palladio and Jones by the celebrated Flemish-born sculptor John Michael Rysbrack (1694–1770) are positioned in front of these sections of wall. Palladio's influence can also be found in the general cubic form of the villa with its central hall with other rooms leading off its axis. The villa is a half cube with a side of 70 feet (21 m), 35 feet high. Inside are rooms of 10 feet (3.0 m) square, 15 feet (4.6 m) square and 15 feet (4.6 m) by 20 feet (6.1 m) by 25 feet. The distance from the apex of the dome to the base of the cellar is 70 feet (21 m), making the whole pile fit within a perfect, invisible cube. However, the decorative cornice at Chiswick was derived from a contemporary source, that of James Gibbs's cornice at the Church of St Martin-in-the-Fields, London.

At the rear of the Villa were positioned 'herm' statues that derive from the Greek god Hermes, the patron of travellers and thus are welcoming figures for all who wish to visit Lord Burlington's gardens (Lord Burlington's gardens at Chiswick were the most visited of all London villas. A small entrance charge applied).

Lord Burlington's intentions for his villa have never been established and received much speculation. The memoirist and gossip, John, Lord Hervey, for example, described the newly built Villa as "Too small to live in, and too big to hang to a watch". John Clerk of Penicuik described it as "Rather curious than convenient", whilst Horace Walpole referred to the villa as "the beautiful model". Burlington only spoke of his villa in passing as his 'toy'. For the most part Burlington's intention for his new building remains a mystery. What is certain is that the villa was never intended for occupation as it contained no kitchens and space for only three four poster beds on the ground floor. It is possible that one purpose of the Villa was as an art gallery, as inventories show more than 167 paintings hanging in situ at Chiswick House in Lord Burlington's lifetime, many purchased on his two Grand Tours of Europe.

== Overview ==
Lord Burlington was not just restricted to the influence of Andrea Palladio as his library list at Chiswick indicates. He owned books by influential Italian Renaissance architects such as Sebastiano Serlio and Leon Battista Alberti and his library contained books by French architects, sculptors, illustrators and architectural theorists such as Jean Cotelle, Philibert de l'Orme, Abraham Bosse, Jean Bullant, Salomon de Caus, Roland Fréart de Chambray, Hugues Sambin, Antoine Desgodetz, and John James's translation of Claude Perrault's Treatise of the Five Orders. Whether Palladio's work inspired Chiswick or not, the Renaissance architect exerted an important influence on Lord Burlington through his plans and reconstructions of lost Roman buildings; many of these unpublished and little known, were purchased by Burlington on his second Grand Tour and housed in cabinets and tables the Blue Velvet Room, which served as his study. These reconstructions were the source for many of the varied geometric shapes within Burlington's Villa, including the use of the octagon, circle and rectangle (with apses). Possibly the most influential building reconstructed by Palladio and used at Chiswick was the monumental Roman Baths of Diocletian: references to this building can be found in the Domed Hall, Gallery, Library and Link rooms.

Burlington's use of Roman sources can be viewed in the steep-pitched dome of the villa which is derived from the Pantheon in Rome. However, the source for the octagonal form of the dome, the Upper Tribunal, Lower Tribunal and cellar at Chiswick all possibly derive from Vincenzo Scamozzi's Rocca Pisana near Vicenza. Burlington may also have been influenced in his choice of octagon from the drawings of the Renaissance architect Sebastiano Serlio (1475–1554), or from Roman buildings of antiquity (for example, Lord Burlington owned Andrea Palladio's drawings of the octagonal mausoleum at Diocletian's Palace at Split in modern Croatia). Archaeological remains have shown the Roman willingness to experiment with different geometric forms in their buildings, such as the underground octagonal hall in Nero's Domus Aurea.

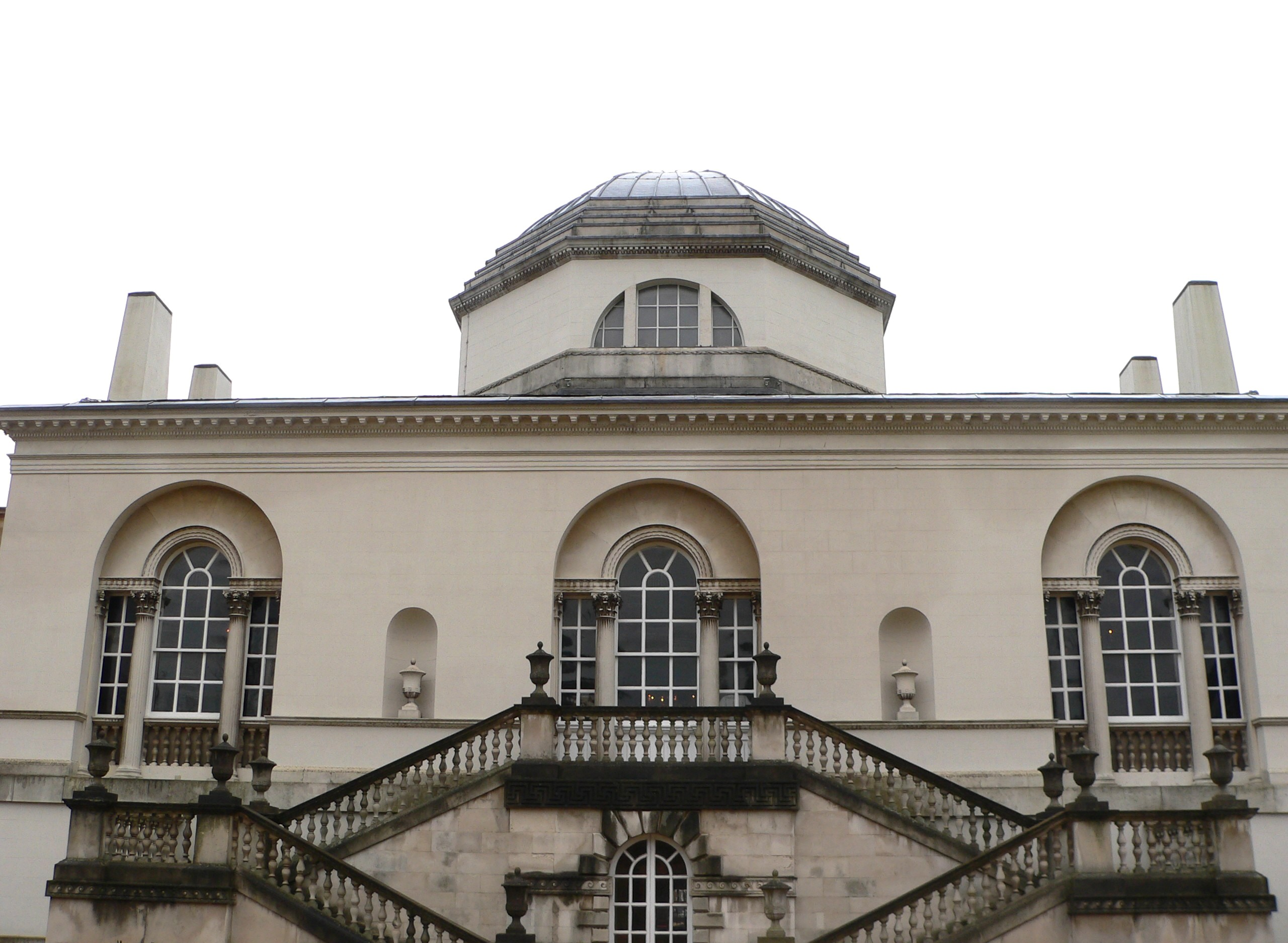
Three concentric relieving arches at rear of the Villa containing Venetian windows. This arrangement derives directly from drawings by Andrea Palladio in Lord Burlington's collection

On the portico leading to the Domed Hall is positioned a bust of the Roman Emperor Augustus. Augustus was regarded by many of the early 18th-century English aristocracy as the greatest of all the Roman Emperors (the early Georgian era was known as the Augustan Age). This link with the Emperor Augustus was reinforced in the garden at Chiswick through the presence of Egyptianizing objects such as sphinxes (who symbolically guard the 'Temple' front and rear), obelisks and stone lions. Lord Burlington and his contemporaries were conscious of the fact that it was Augustus who invaded Egypt and brought back Egyptian objects and erected them in Rome. The influence of Rome manifested itself at Chiswick through Burlington's strategic deployment of statues, including those of a Borghese gladiator, a Venus de' Medici, a wolf (used to inspire nostalgic memories of the legendary founders of Rome, Romulus and Remus, a goat (symbolising the zodiac of Capricorn, the sign under which Octavian was conceived) and a boar located at the rear of the Villa (symbolic of the legendary Calydonian Boar hunt). Inside the Villa many references to the Roman goddess Venus abound, as Venus was the mother of Aeneas who fled Troy and co-founded Rome. On the forecourt to the Villa are several 'term' statues that derive their forms from the Roman god Terminus, the god of distance and space. Such items therefore are used as boundary markers, positioned in the hedge at set distances apart.

== Principal rooms ==
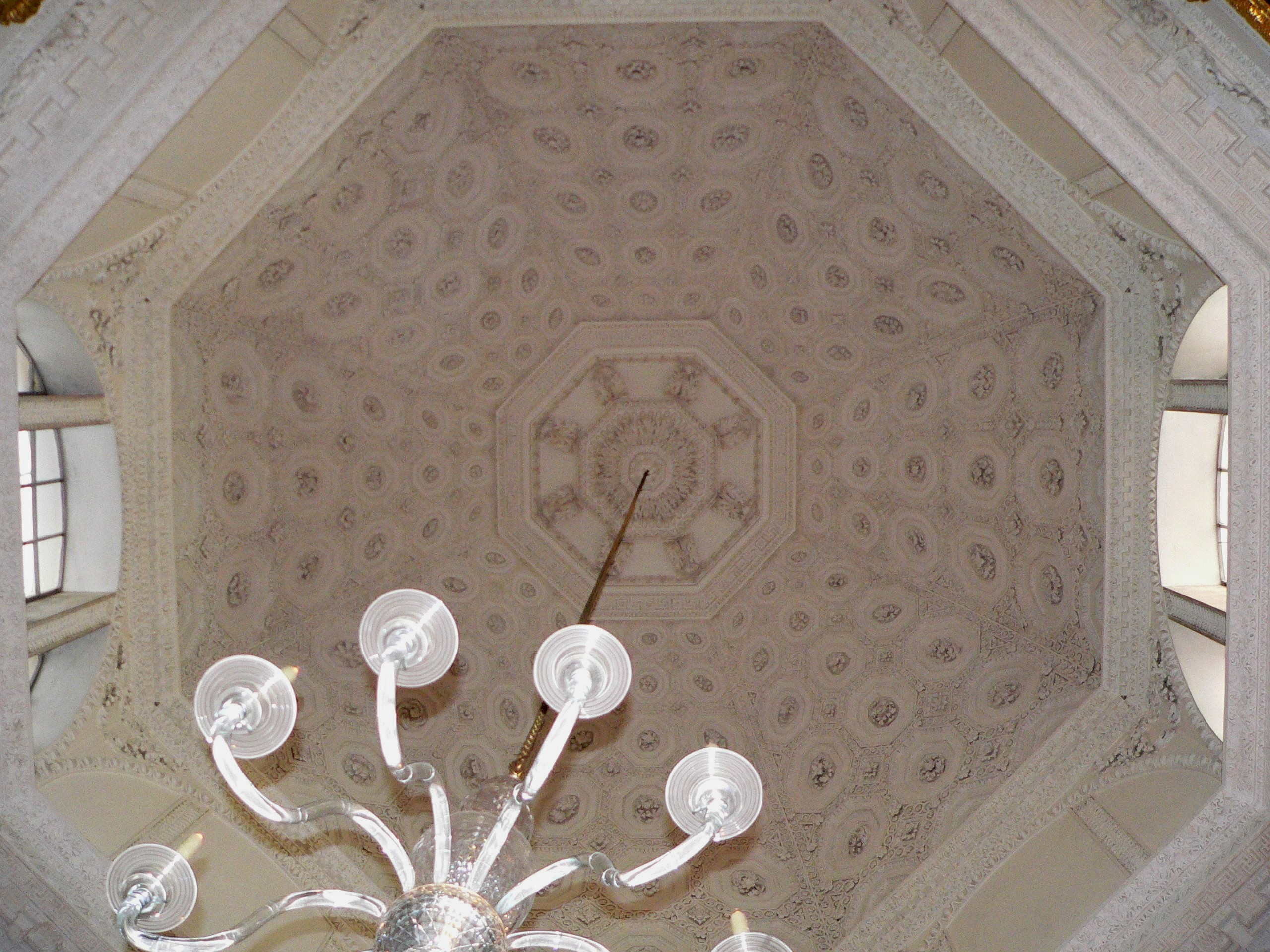
The coffered ceiling in the Domed Hall, inspired by the Roman ruin of the Basilica of Maxentius

Chiswick Villa is built of brick and its façade fronted with Portland stone with a small amount of stucco. The walls of the Villa, interrupted only by the porticos and Serlian windows, were deliberately austere, yet its interiors more refined and colourful. This followed both Palladio and Jones's recommendations that the façade of a building, like that of a gentlemen, should be businesslike and serious, yet inside, away from prying eyes, could be more relaxed, playful and informal.

Two features of Chiswick Villa were revolutionary in English architectural practice- the centrally-planned layout, and the geometry of the rooms. Chiswick Villa was the first domestic building in England to be designed with a central room which provided access ('communications') to other rooms around its perimeter. The source for this feature was Andrea Palladio's centrally planned Villas, such as the Villa Capra and Villa Foscari. In the design of the rooms Lord Burlington used different geometric shapes, some with coved ceilings. Such a variety of differing spatial forms, many derived from Palladio's reconstructions of ancient Roman buildings (such as the Baths of Diocletian) had never previously been seen in English architecture. Many of the most important rooms within Chiswick Villa were situated on the piano nobile (Upper Floor) and comprise eight rooms and a link building. The rooms on this level were either of the Composite or Corinthian order of architecture to illustrate their important status.

In contrast, the Villa's ground-floor level was always intended to be plain and unadorned; it has low ceilings and little carving or gilding. Its rooms were for business, and Lord Burlington followed Palladio's recommendation to restrict the lowest order of Roman architecture, the Tuscan, to the ground floor. The three internal spiral staircases, based on Palladian precedent, were not intended to be accessed by Lord Burlington's guests, and were used only by the house servants; a dumb waiter was installed in place of the fourth internal staircase.

=== Upper Tribune (or Domed Hall) ===
The Upper Tribune is an octagonal room surmounted with a central dome. The dome has octagonal coffering of a type derived from the Basilica of Maxentius. The half-moon lunette windows below the dome are called 'Thermal' or 'Diocletian' windows. Their use at Chiswick was the first in northern Europe. Running beneath the Diocletian windows in the frieze are several lion heads, a feature also associated with the Diocletian bath houses, with Old St Paul's Cathedral under Inigo Jones, and with the Temple of Jerusalem.

In the original (and unexecuted) decorative scheme for this room, illustrated by William Kent around 1727, the spaces between the Diocletian windows were represented as half-moon panels with painted scenes, possibly frescos. The picture frames were smaller than those in place today and therefore did not have the problem of resting uncomfortably just above the stone pediments. Instead of busts on brackets, Kent includes small panels placed between the four doors. Kent also illustrated small cherubs who reclined on the triangular pediments, similar to those illustrated by Inigo Jones on the new west front of Old St. Paul's Cathedral.

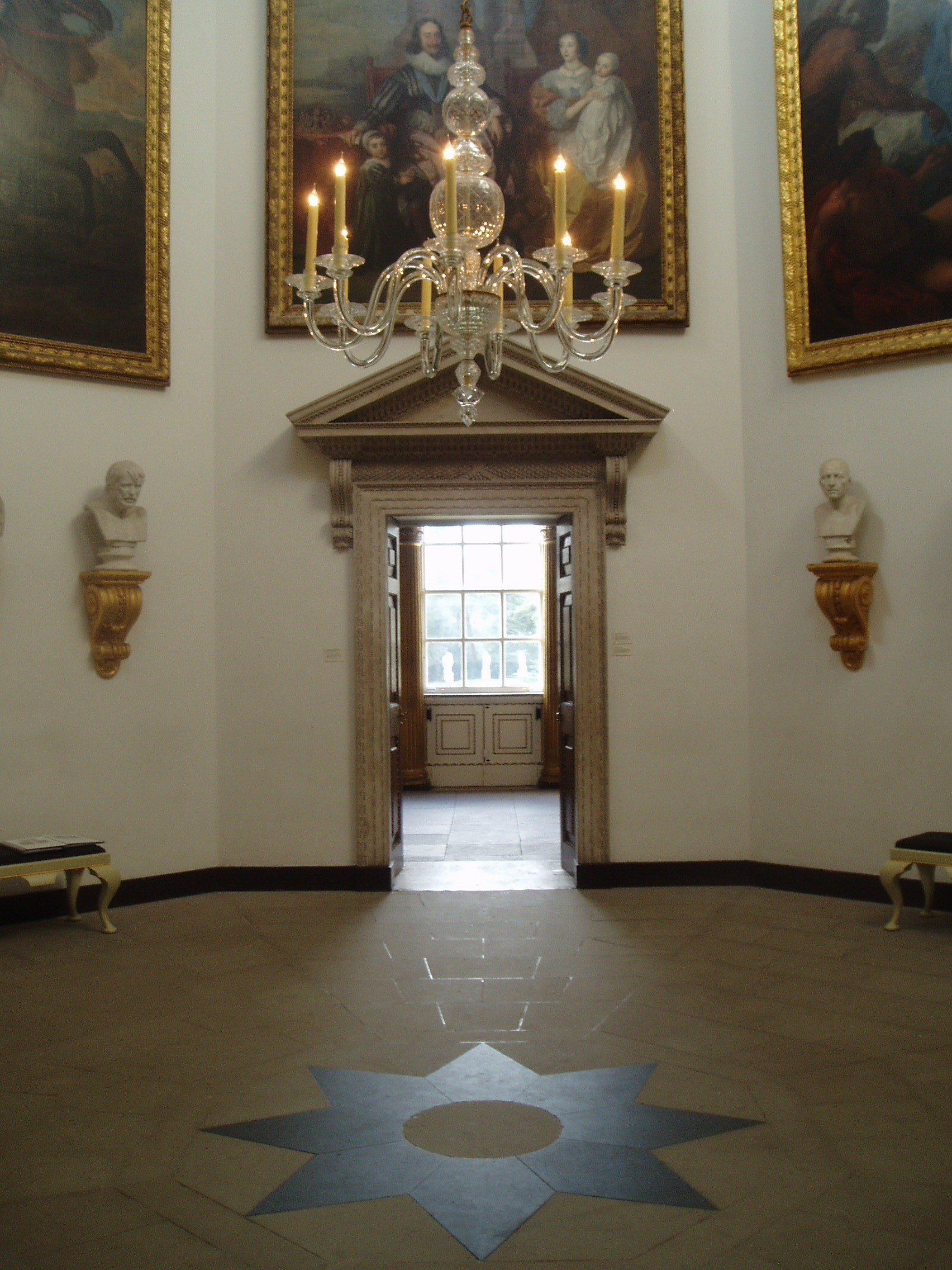
The Upper Tribunal looking towards the Gallery. Of note is the eight-pointed Garter star/Masonic Blazing Star in the centre of the floor with a painting of King Charles I in the background

This room also contained four heavy gilded tables carved with Kent's characteristic baroque shells and accompanied with central carved lion masks (complementing the lion heads in the frieze). For each table two mahogany chairs were placed either side. These chairs had pediment backs which matched the four stone triangular pediments in this room. Eight large paintings were placed in gilded frames above the stone pediments and busts, including three of the Stuart and French Royal family, one executed by Sir Godfrey Kneller of Lord Burlington and his sisters, and popular mythological scenes such as "Daphne and Apollo" and "The Judgment of Paris" Twelve antique busts of Roman and Greek figures, such as Emperors, poets, politicians and generals were also positioned on gilded brackets designed by Lord Burlington..

In the centre of the floor in this room is positioned an eight-pointed star, a potential reference to the star of the Order of the Garter which was introduced by King Charles I in 1629 and received by Lord Burlington from King George II in 1730. However, positioned immediately before the large portrait of King Charles I and his family it provides further circumstantial evidence that Lord Burlington may have received an earlier secret Garter from the Stuart Kings in exile (in this painting King Charles I can be seen wearing the blue sash of the Garter with a "Lesser" George attached).

This central room, which provides access to the Gallery, Green and Red Velvet Rooms, would originally have been used for poetry readings, theatrical performances, gambling and small musical recitals (for example the composer George Frideric Handel (1685–1759) may have performed in this room. Handel lived with the family at Burlington House for two years when he arrived in England in 1712). The Upper Tribune was entered from the outside staircase in imitation of the staircases on many of Palladio's Villas in Vicenza.

=== Gallery ===
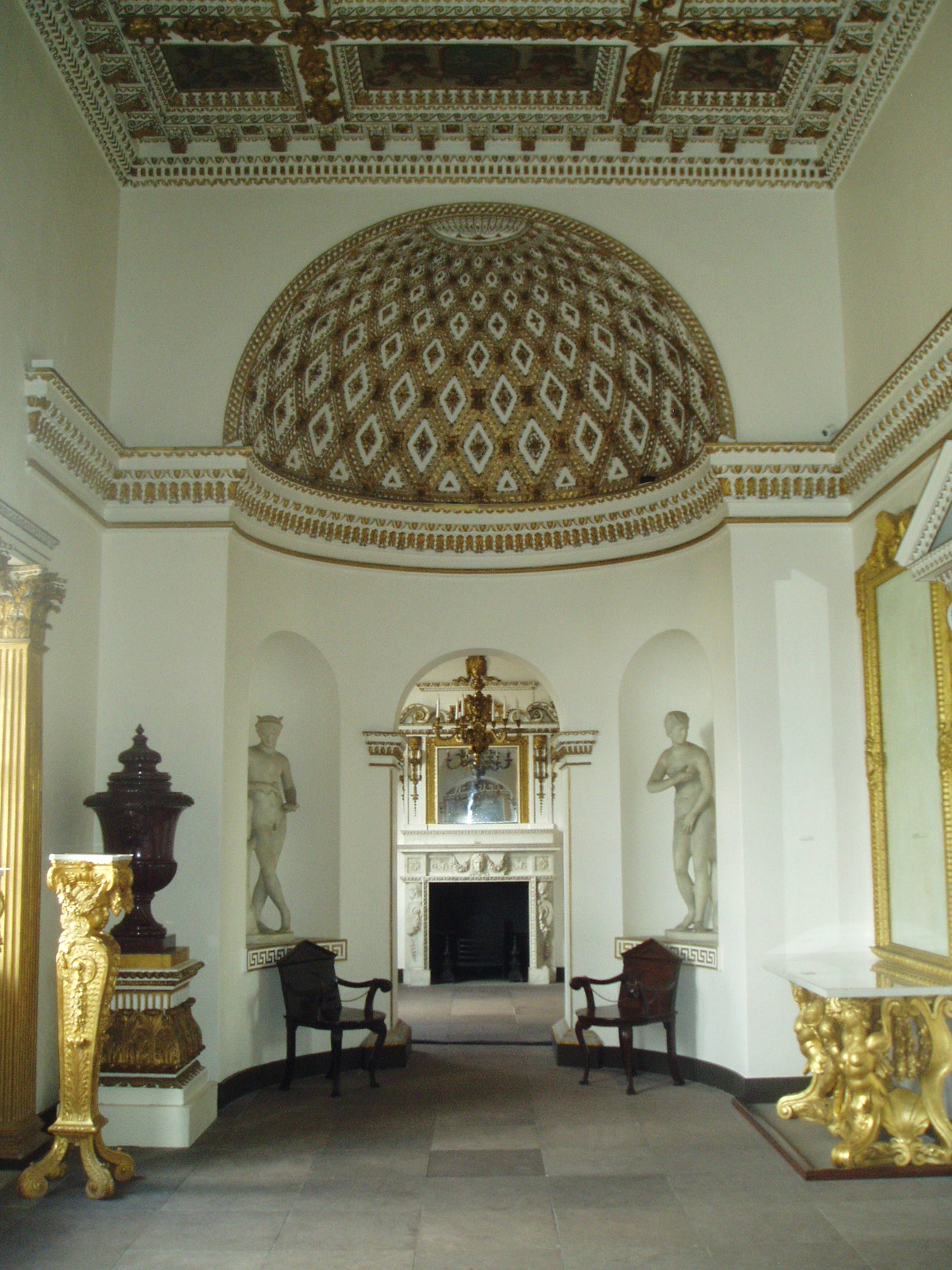
View of the central Gallery showing the apse derived from the ancient Roman Temple of Venus and Roma

The tripartite series of rooms overlooking the garden at the rear of the Villa are collectively known as the ‘Gallery Rooms’. The distinctive apses here are derived from the Temple of Venus and Roma - the same source that Inigo Jones utilised when he refaced the west front of old St. Paul's Cathedral before its destruction in 1666. In the four niches were placed classical mythological statues of a Muse, Mercury, Apollo and Venus. This Gallery was designed as a statue Gallery and if in Italy this series of rooms would have been a loggia (a room open to the elements on one or more sides). The distinctive nine-panelled compartmentalised ceiling is a conflation of two ceilings derived from The Queen's House at Greenwich and The Banqueting House at Whitehall, both designed by Inigo Jones and both Royal apartments.

The central painting, by the Venetian artist Sebastiano Ricci (1659–1734), is a close copy of Paolo Veronese's (c.1528–88) ‘The Defense of Scutari’ located in the Doge's Palace, Venice. The side paintings, believed to be by William Kent, depict double cornucopias which form crusader tents accompanied by Turkish prisoners with arms and armour positioned in various postures of captivity. The military theme in these paintings may possibly be a reference to Lord Burlington's status as a Knight of the Order of the Garter or his position as head of the 'Gentlemen Pensioners' (symbolic bodyguards to the King). Alternatively these paintings may be of a Masonic motivation as in the 18th century it was believed that the Crusader Military orders, such as The Poor Knights of the Temple of Solomon (Knights Templar) and the Knights of St John (Hospitallers), were in some way inexplicably linked. These higher 'Chivalric and Historic' orders met in 'encampments' rather than lodges and were predominantly Christian in their outlook and composition.

This room also contains two purple Egyptian porphyry urns purchased by Burlington on his first Grand Tour in 1714. These are accompanied by two heavy tables designed by Kent with their distinctive shells and featuring a mask of Neptune, accompanied by two water cherubs wearing pearls. The two handsome marble tops were inlaid with twenty two different types of marble and formed into geometric shapes with Greek Key (meander) borders. These were also joined by two torchers (flame holders) in the form of ‘Terms’. Either end of the Gallery are rooms that are circular and octagonal in shape. Together with the central rectangular Gallery, this series of geometric forms derive from Andrea Palladio's reconstructions of the Diocletian Bathhouses, which designs Lord Burlington owned. The female faces in the decorations of the two end rooms tell the story as told by Vitruvius of the origins of the Corinthian order. The double sunflowers mark Lord and Lady Burlington's status as courtiers in the service of the King and Queen.

When the Villa was rented out to John Patrick Crichton-Stuart, 3rd Marquess of Bute between 1865 and 1892, the central Gallery space, headed by apses at both ends, became his chapel.

=== Pillared Drawing Room ===
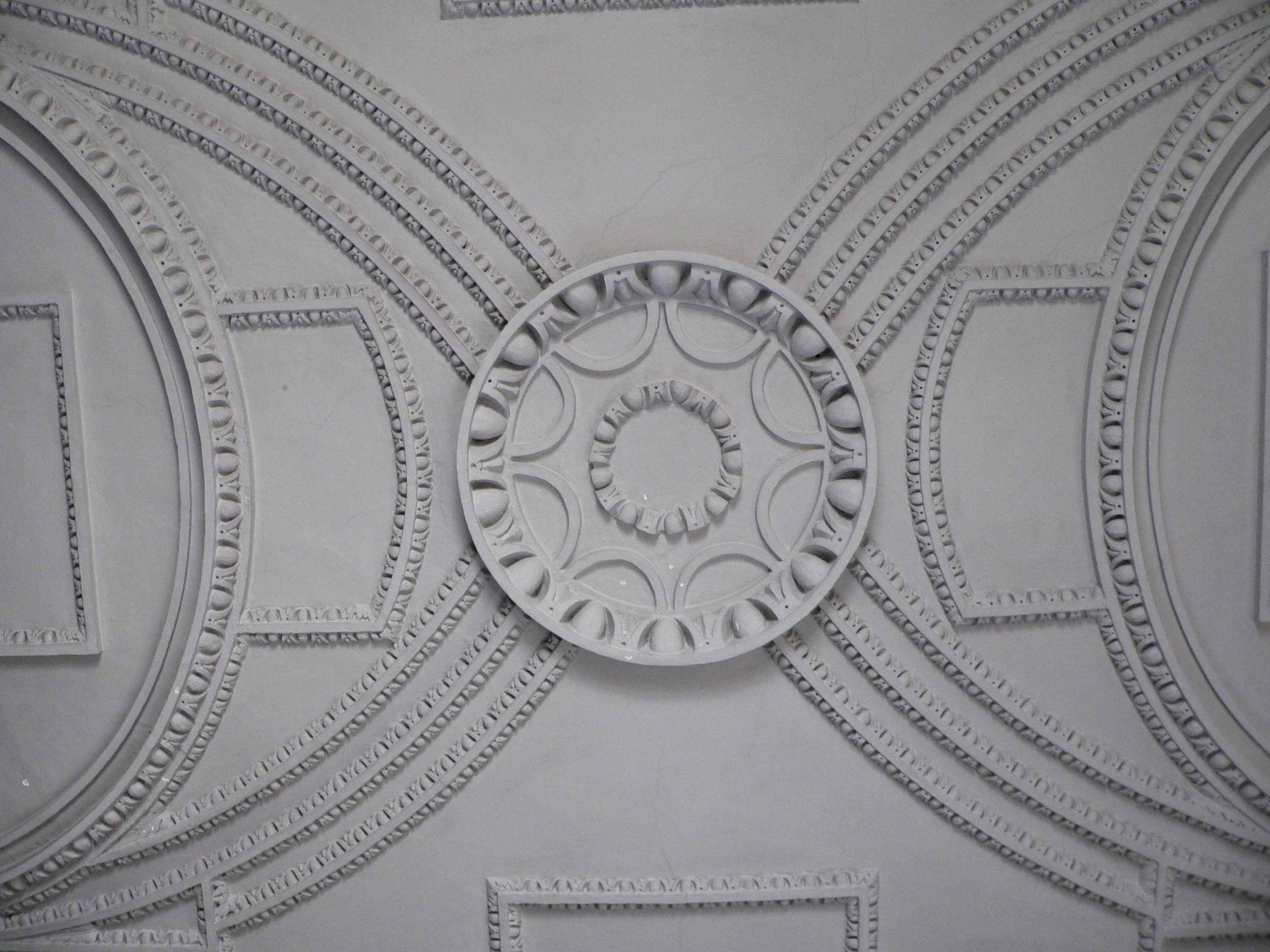
Ceiling in the Upper Link.

Today known as the Upper Link, this room was built in about to attach the new Villa to the old Jacobean House. The room is divided into three sections by the inclusion of unfluted Corinthian pillars which support an elaborate Corinthian entablature and ceiling. Above the entablature are open screens. These features are associated with the Baths of Diocletian and Caracalla, with Andrea Palladio's reconstructions again the source. The ceiling is a copy of a 16th-century design depicting a decorative relief from a Roman sarcophagus from a room that may have sealed a mausoleum in the Roman funerary city of Pozzuoli. Outside this room is a central avenue flanked by funerary urns. This was Lord Burlington's attempt to symbolise the Appian Way which led to ancient Rome. It was by this road that the Emperor Augustus chose to enter Rome after the assassination of Julius Caesar on 15 March 44 BC.

=== Green Velvet Room ===
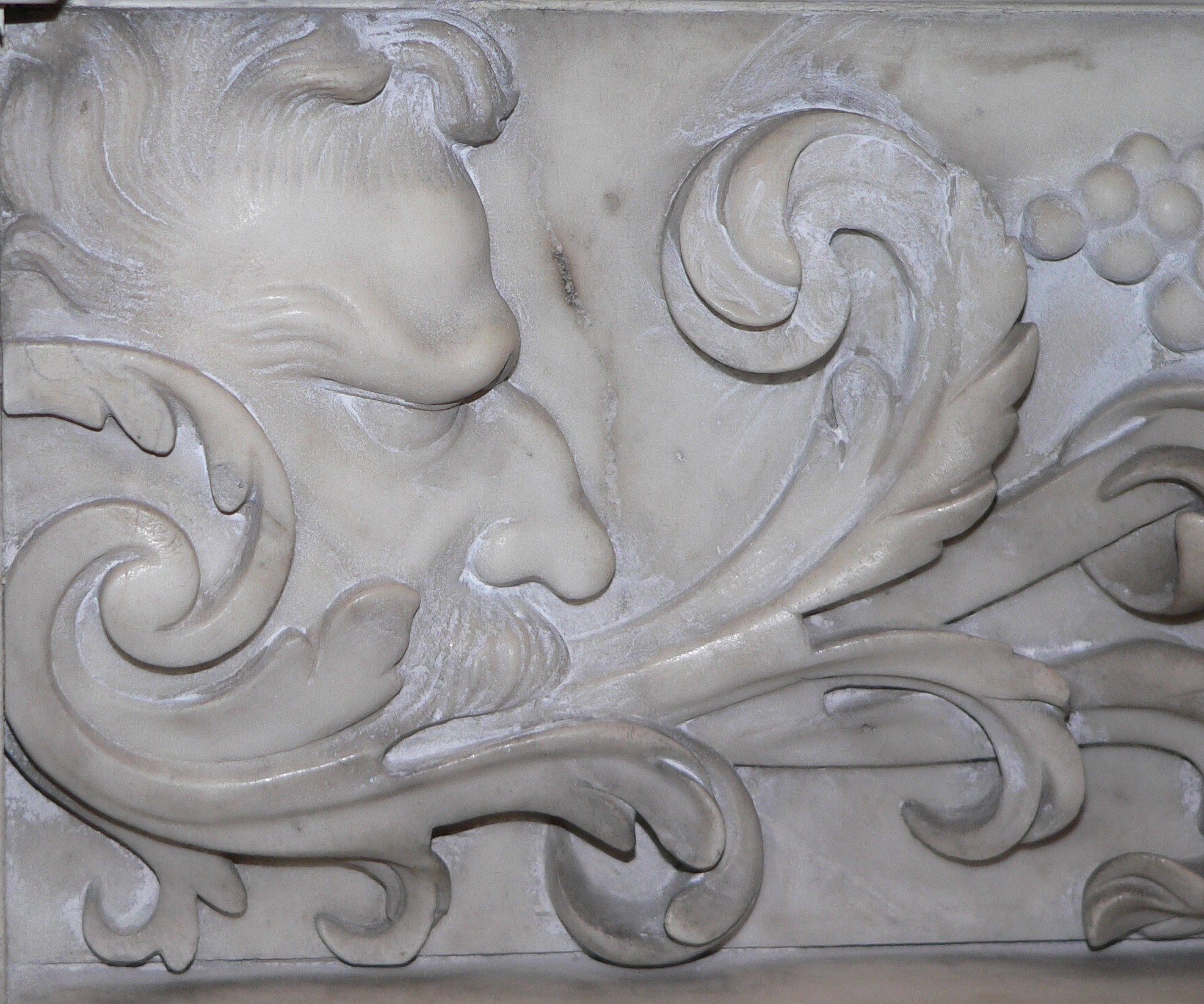
One of four Green Men in the fireplaces in the Green Velvet Room at Chiswick Villa

The Green Velvet Room is 15 feet (4.6 m) by 20 feet (6.1 m) by 25 feet (7.6 m) in size and has a plaster ceiling with nine deeply recessed, gilded compartments derived from Inigo Jones's design for the Queen's Chapel at Old Somerset House (formally Denmark House, now demolished). Four depictions of the Green Man, pagan god of the oak and symbol of rebirth and resurrection, can be viewed carved into the marble fireplaces. The stone overmantels are a conflation of two designs by Inigo Jones and contain mythological paintings by Jean Baptiste Monnoyer (1636–99) and the Venetian painter Sebastiano Ricci who also carried out commissions at Burlington House in Piccadilly. This room later become an extension to Lady Burlington's Bedchamber and Closet, situated next door. Today this rooms contains six paintings of the gardens by the Flemish artist Pieter Andreas Rysbrack. These paintings are particularly valuable as they trace the development of the gardens from its formal to naturalistic appearance under Burlington, Kent and Pope. This room also features a painting by George Lambert with figures attributed to William Hogarth, regarded by art historians as the first painting to depict the English Landscape Garden.

=== Lady Burlington's Bedchamber and Closet ===
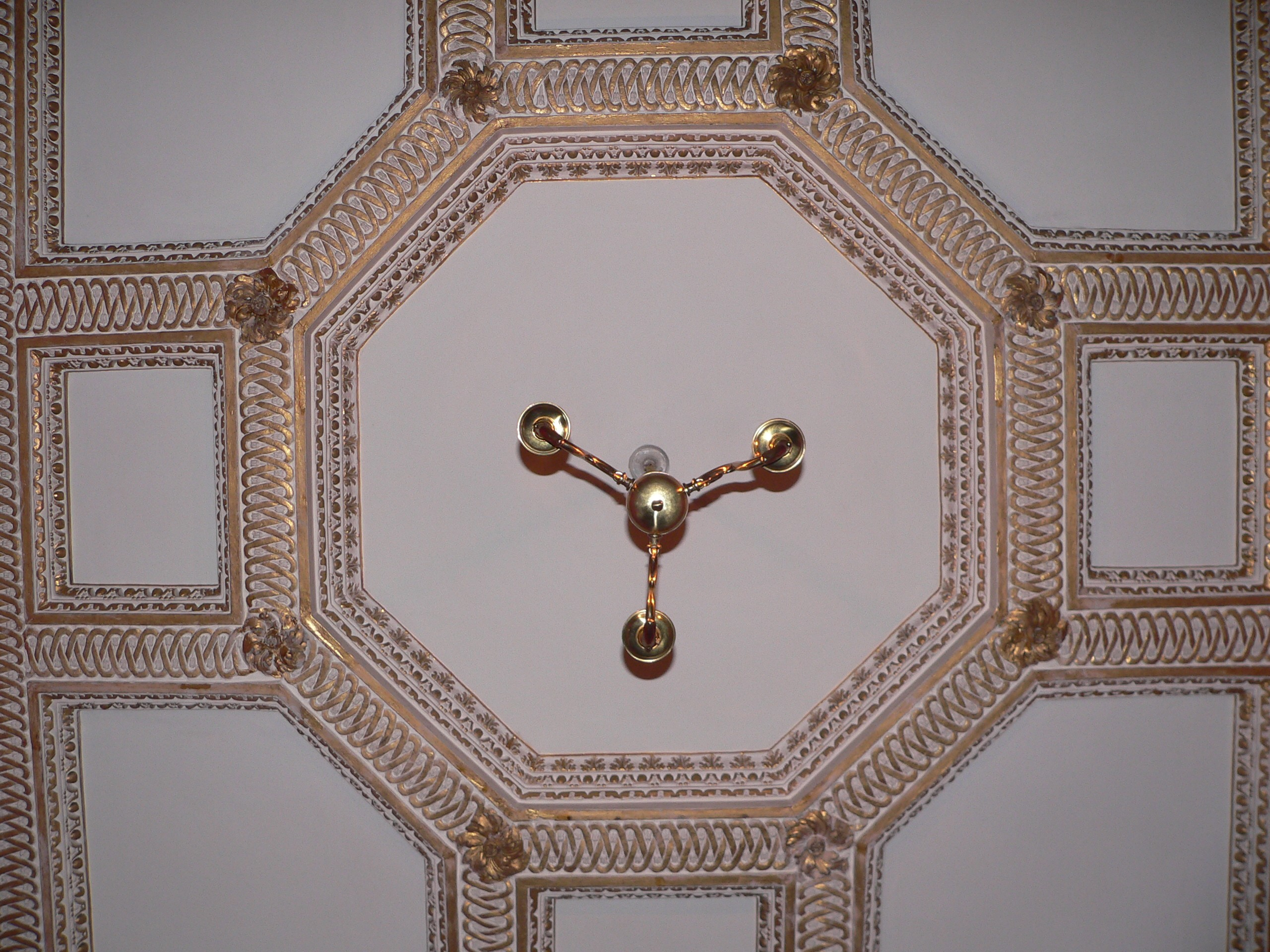
Ceiling in the Bedchamber Closet and Red Closet Room, derived from a ceiling by Inigo Jones at The Queen's House, Greenwich

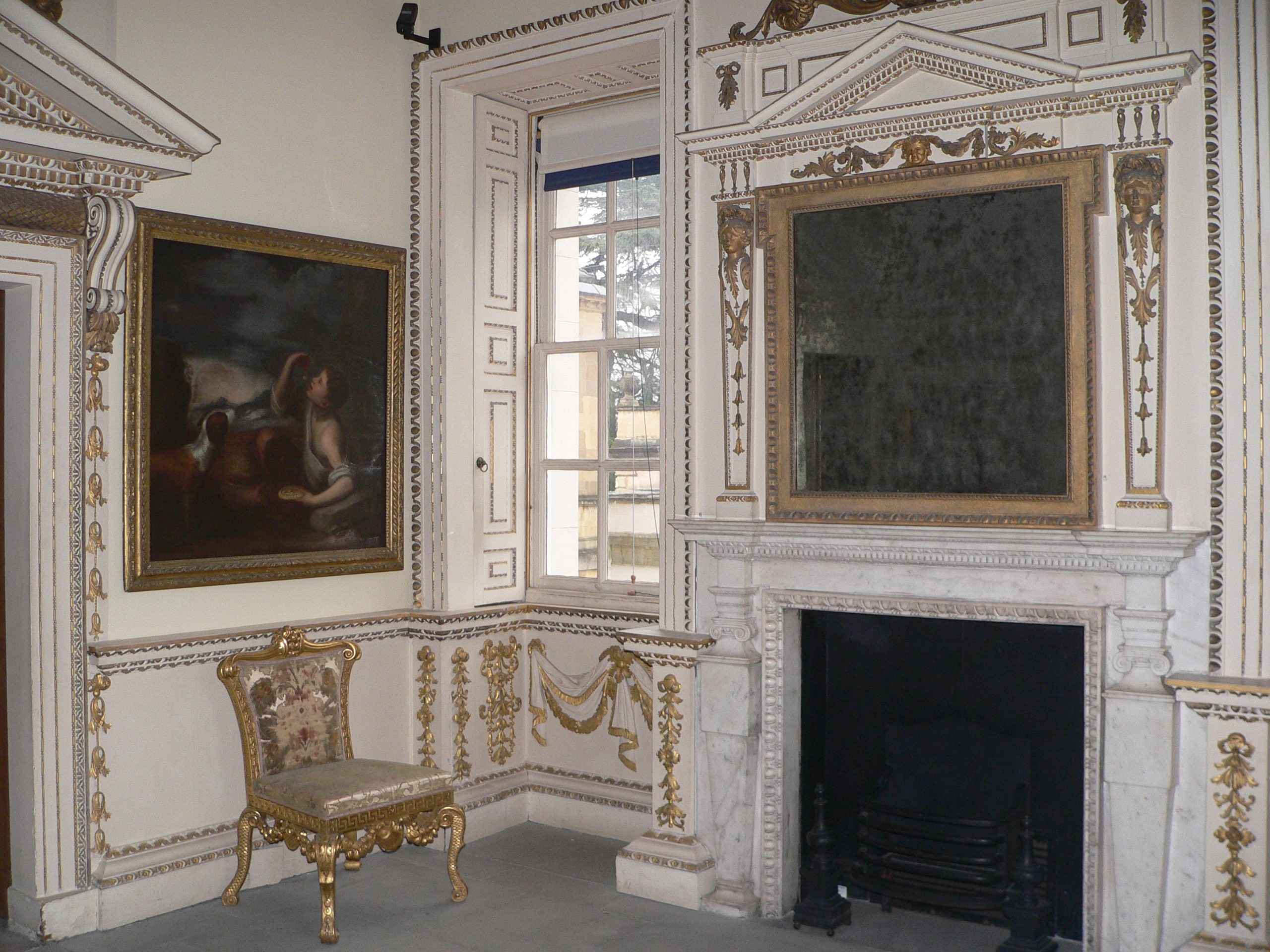
Bedchamber Closet

Lady Burlington died in this bedchamber in 1758, as did the Whig leader Charles James Fox in 1806. The designation of this room in Lord Burlington's lifetime is unknown, but it appears Lady Burlington occupied this room some time after the death of her last daughter in 1754. Records at Chatsworth House show that the room was used intermittently as a children's nursery, undoubtedly for Lady Burlington's grand children and subsequently for the children of Georgiana and Elizabeth Foster. Today, several portraits of the Savile family can be viewed here and in the Bedchamber closet. One painting of note is of the poet Alexander Pope, painted by his good friend and fellow drinker William Kent.

The bedchamber closet is a perfect cube and has a ceiling design derived from the Queen's House, Greenwich. Originally the room would have contained around twenty seven paintings and access would have been restricted to Lady Burlington's closest friends. Prince of Wales swags and feathers can be seen in both rooms, possibly denoting the Villa as a Royal Palace.

=== Red Velvet Room ===
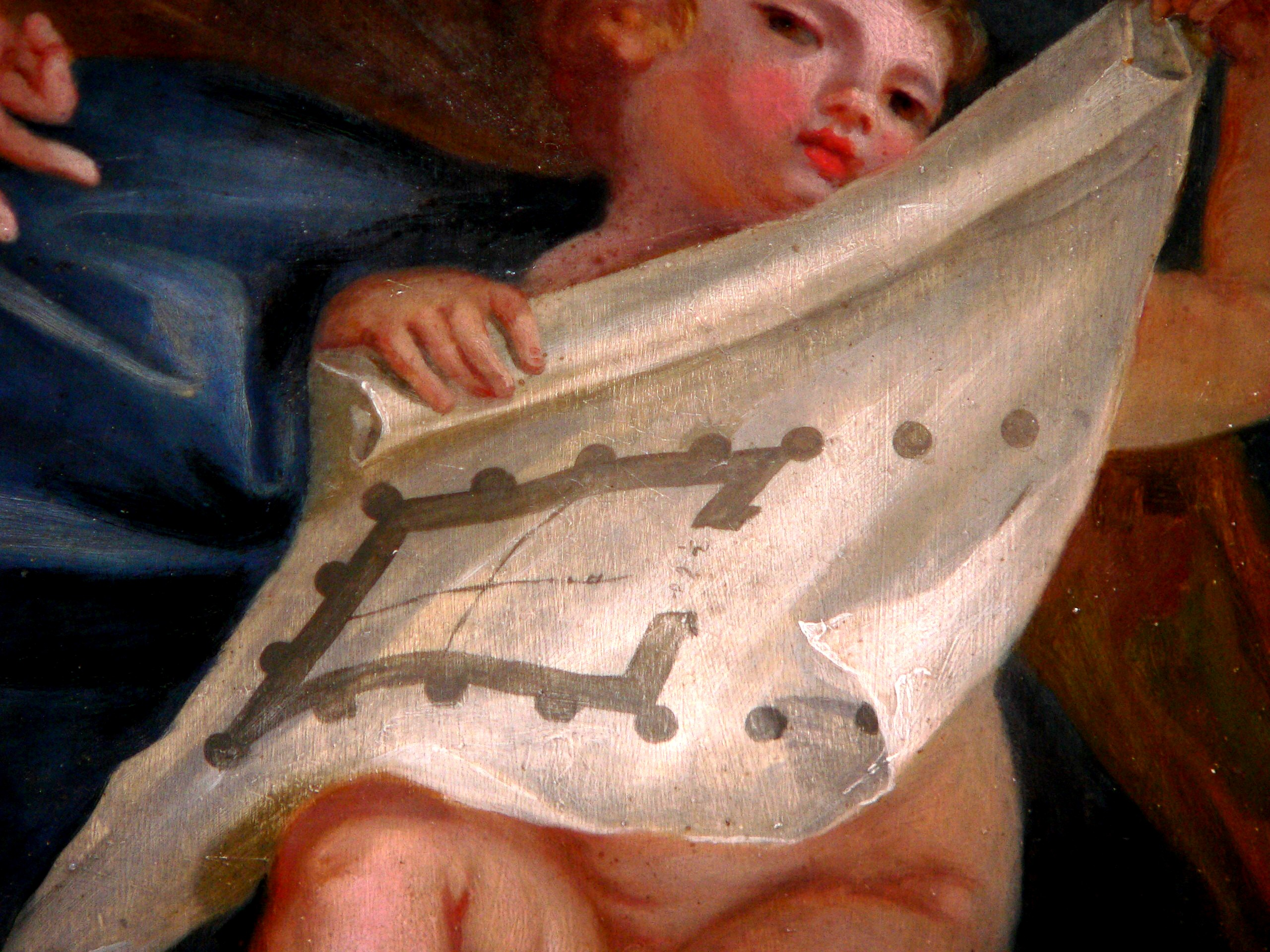
Detail in the Red Velvet Room ceiling of a ground floor plan of the Temple of Fortuna Virilis after Andrea Palladio

The Red Velvet Room once contained the largest and most expensive paintings in Lord Burlington's collection, including paintings by Sir Anthony van Dyck (1599–1641), Giacomo Cavedone (1577–1660), Peter Paul Rubens (1573–1640), Rembrandt van Ryn (1606–69), Salvator Rosa (1615–1673), Pier Francesco Mola (1612–1666), Jacopo Ligozzi (c.1547–1632), Jean Lemaire (1598–1659), Francisque Millet (1642–79) and Leonardo da Vinci (1452–1519). The Venetian window in this room is derived from the Queen's Chapel at St James's Palace and was much imitated. The chimneypieces and surrounds again derive from Jonesian sources, in this case from the Queen's House, Greenwich. These marble chimneypieces have the inclusion of roses, Scottish thistles, grapes, sunflowers, oak apples, Pomegranates and fleur-de-lys which may be interpreted as Jacobite symbols.

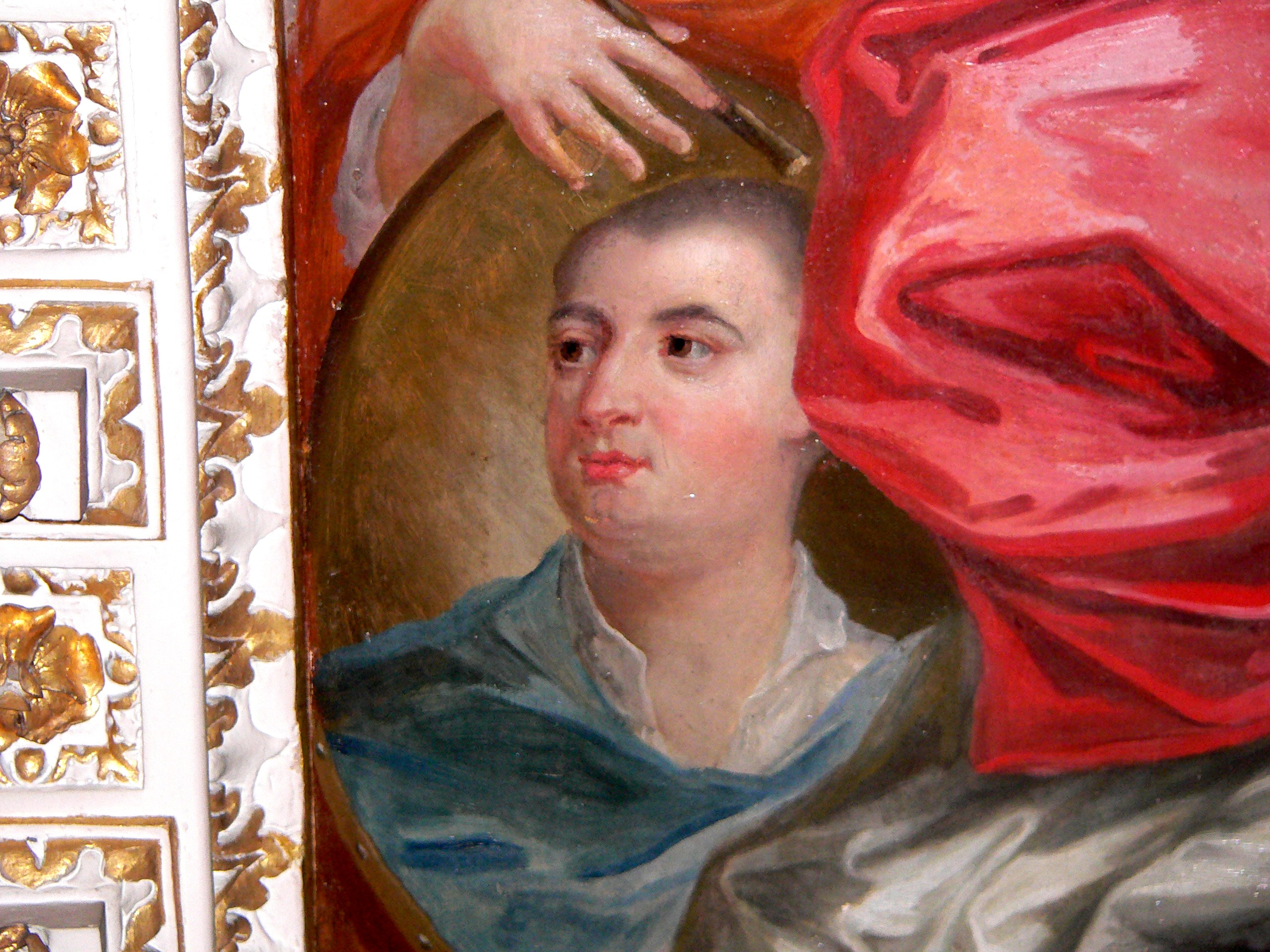
Detail from the Red Velvet Room ceiling of a self-portrait of William Kent. This illustrates Lord Burlington's patronage of artists.

The ceiling, similar in design to that in the Green Velvet Room, but containing painted panels has at its centre a painting attributed to William Kent representing Lord Burlington's patronage of the arts. The main character is the Roman god Mercury, the great patron of the arts and god of commerce, who is dispensing money into the arts depicted at the bottom of the panel. Burlington's wealth is represented by a putto who holds a cornucopia. The arts are represented by a self-portrait of William Kent (art), a supine bust of Inigo Jones (sculpture) and a putto with a temple plan of the Temple of Fortuna Virilis as depicted by Palladio in his architectural treatise I quattro libri dell’architettura first published in 1570.

An additional interpretation of this ceiling and its iconography relates to Freemasonry and its legendary history, and that this space could have functioned as a working Masonic Lodge. Positioned around the central painting are six roundels containing personifications of six of the then known stars or planets of the Moon, Venus, Sun, Mars, Jupiter and Saturn with their associated zodiac signs. The seventh planet, that of Mercury, is personified in the central painting and is accompanied by a section of the northern zodiacal wheel containing the zodiacs for the planet Mercury and the constellations Gemini and Virgo. As such this ceiling painting is an important depiction of the universe as viewed through early Georgian eyes. (The Freemasons equated the seven known planets with the several liberal arts of which the fifth, Geometry, was considered the most important). At the centre of the painting is positioned the eight pointed star of the Order of the Garter which Lord Burlington received from King George II in 1730. This star also represents the Sun at the longest day of the year, the Summer Solstice, a day which the Freemasons associate with their Patron Saint, the 'messenger' (like Mercury) St John the Baptist.

Recent research on the iconography of the ceiling paintings in this room has also suggested that it may be the first visual reference to the third degree of Freemasonry, that of 'Master Mason' which first come to light in around 1730.

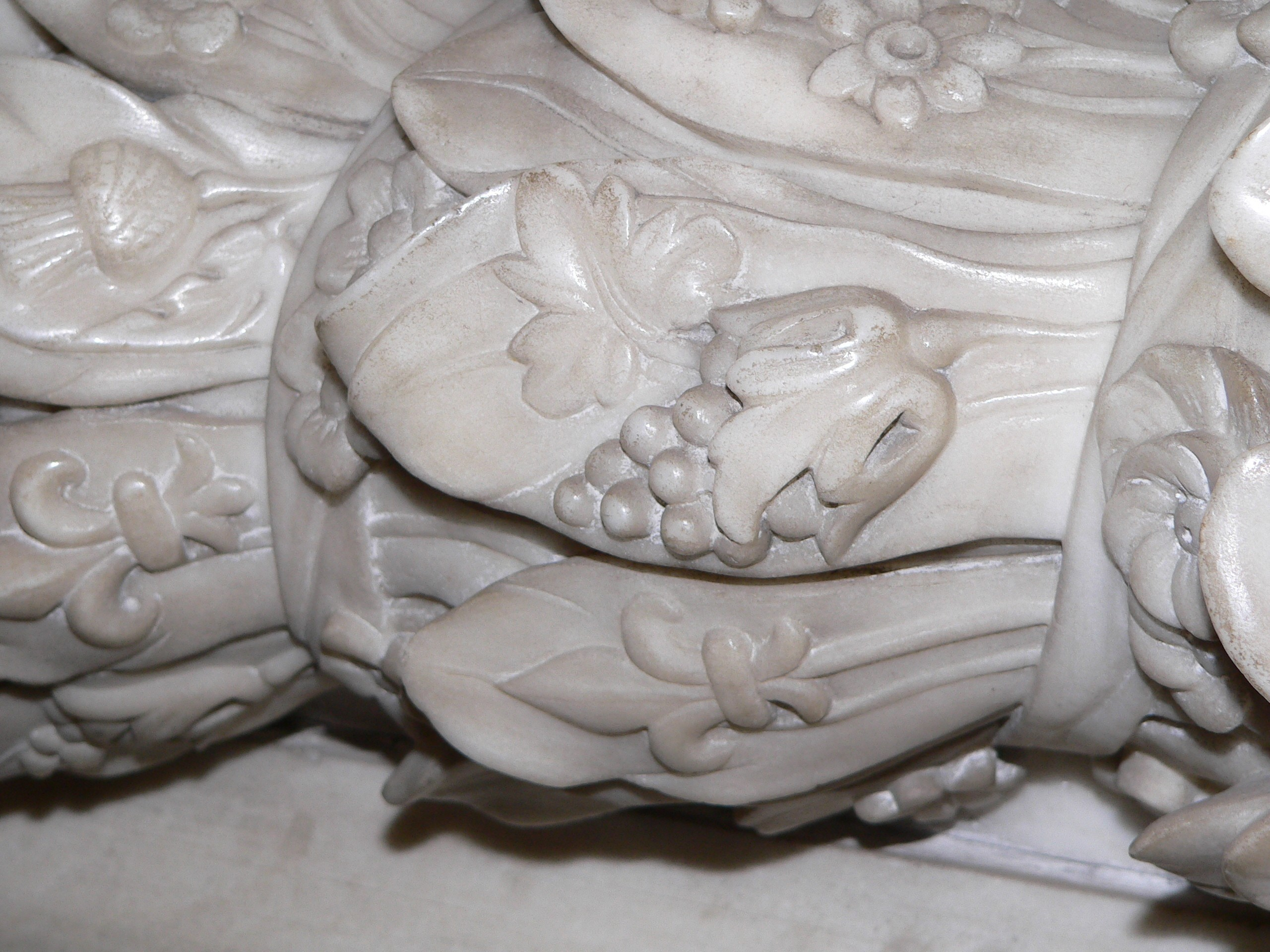
Thistles, Scottish thistles and Fleur-de-lys- Jacobite symbols in the marble fireplaces?

A third, and potentially the most controversial explanation of the iconographical program of the central ceiling painting can be read in terms of Lord Burlington's suspected Jacobite loyalties. In this regard the meaning of the painting can be interpreted as the 'Crucifixion' and 'Resurrection' of King Charles I, the great Stuart martyr whose murder was promoted in Jacobite rhetoric as paralleled to the Passion of Jesus Christ (King Charles II returned from exile in 1660). If this reading is correct, the three ladies at the bottom of the central panel represent the three Maries who biblically were present at Christ's Crucifixion. Here the bare-breasted lady in blue with child is the Virgin Mary; the lady dressed in blue and red with reddish hair bound up in the style of a courtesan and on her knees as if at the base of the cross, Mary Magdalene. The third lady, holding a roundel containing the image of William Kent, is the remaining Mary. King Charles I is represented by both the fallen bust of Inigo Jones and the god Mercury, as the Stuarts associated themselves with this Roman god of eloquence (as depicted on the Banqueting House ceiling) and ruled as 'Mercurian' Monarchs. Lord Burlington would also have been aware of the Stuarts identification with Mercury through the theatre and masque set designs for the Stuart Court which were designed by Inigo Jones, the majority of which Lord Burlington owned.

=== Blue Velvet Room and Closet ===
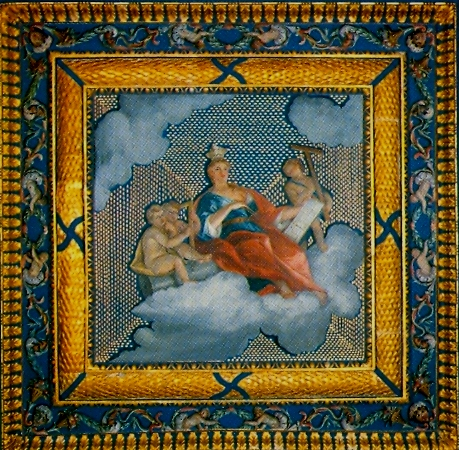
The ceiling of the Blue Velvet Room depicting "Architecture"

The Blue Velvet Room is a perfect cube measuring 15 feet (4.6 m) square to the egg-and-dart lip. This room was Lord Burlington's studiola or ‘Drawing Room’ and originally contained a large table by William Kent which contained many designs by architects such as Andrea Palladio, Inigo Jones, John Webb and Vincenzo Scamozzi, which were ready for inspection. The ceiling is supported by eight large cyma reversa brackets, all in the Italian manner.

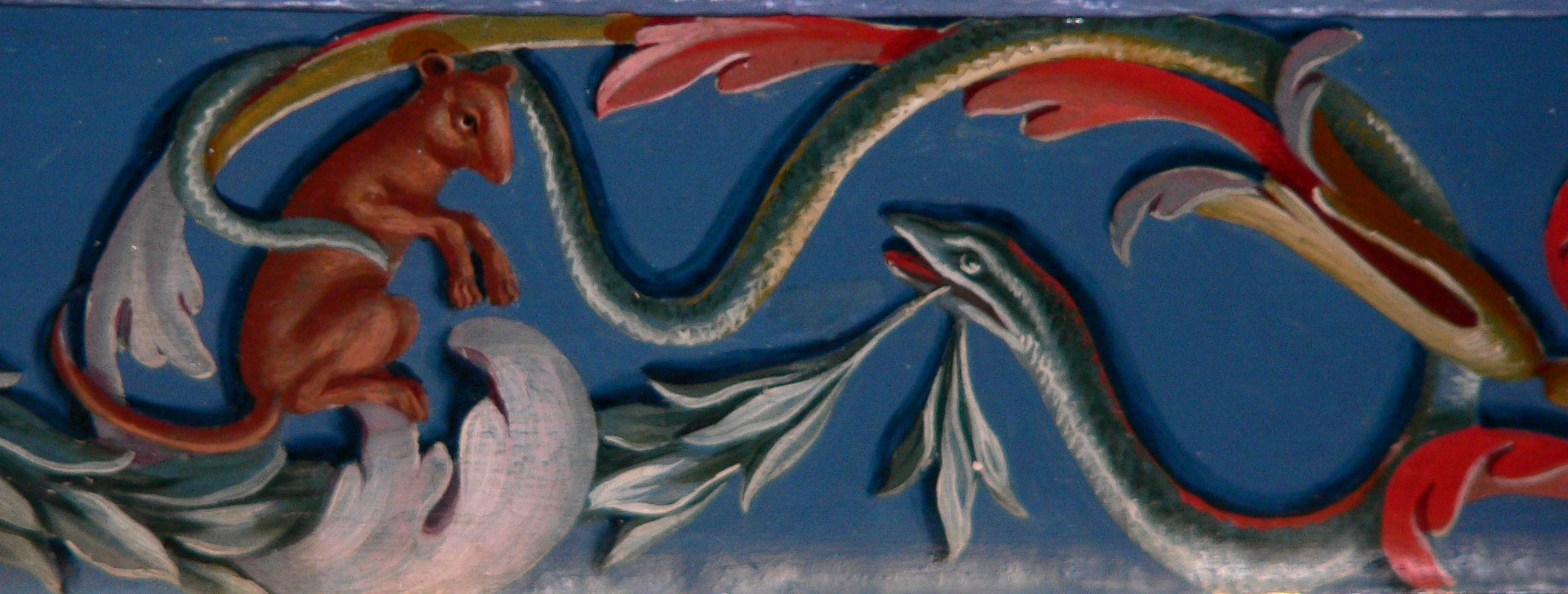
Snakes and rats, symbols sacred to Venus and Apollo, in the ceiling

The coved ceiling, painted by William Kent, depicts a personification of ‘Architecture’ accompanied by three putti who grasp architectural implements in the form of T-Square, Set-Square and plumb line. ‘Architecture’ herself holds dividers and an unknown Temple plan (possible derived from the Jesuit architect Juan Bautista Villalpando who produced a classical reconstruction of the sanctum sanctorum at the heart of Solomon's Temple). All four characters are seated on a fallen, hollow, metal column and are surrounded by a canopy of stars.

This ceiling represents Lord Burlington's interest in architecture. Alternatively the painted ceiling and its surrounding decoration (including the presence of rats and snakes) can be interpreted as having a Masonic program, as dividers, set-squares, T-Squares and plumb lines were important Masonic symbols of morality. The putto to the left of ‘Architecture’ holds his finger to his lips suggesting silence or secrecy – a gesture mimicking the Egyptian child god of silence, Harpocrates. The idea that this room could have been used for initiation into Masonic mysteries is further supported by the proportions of this room as a perfect cube measuring 15x15x15 feet – the equivalent of 10 cubits by 10 cubits by 10 cubits, the stated dimensions of the Holy of Holies within Moses' Tabernacle according to the Bible.

== Rooms on the ground floor ==
=== Lower Tribune ===
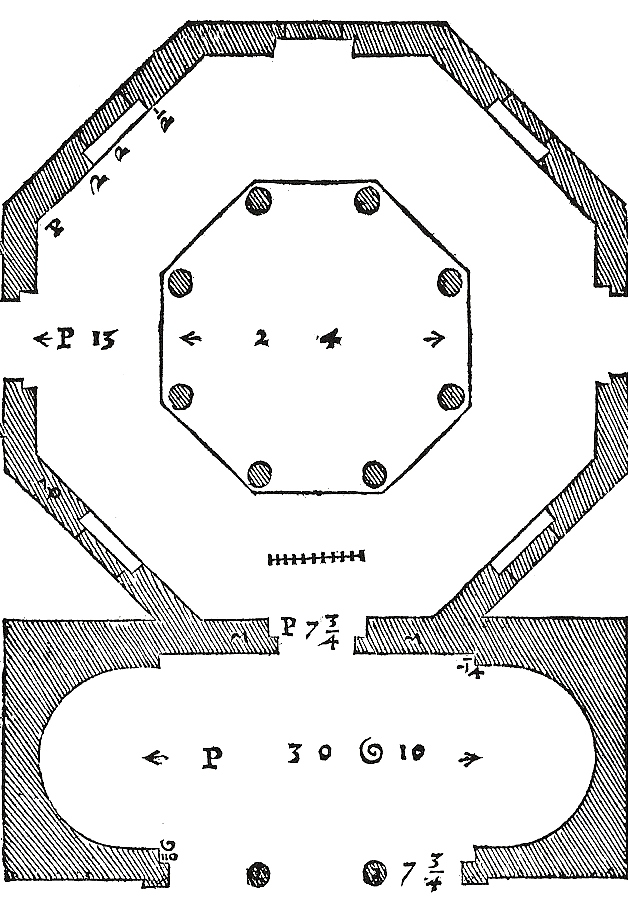
Palladio's reconstruction of the Baptistry of Constantine. This was the building on which the Lower Tribune with its ring of eight Tuscan columns was based

The Lower Tribune was essentially a waiting room (an ‘inner court’ or ‘vestibule’) for associates wishing to meet with Lord Burlington. The room is an octagon with eight Tuscan columns positioned around its perimeter. The architect Andrea Palladio made it clear that the Tuscan order of architecture, being the simplest of the five Roman orders, should only ever be used on the ground floor of a building as they were suitable for prisons, fortifications and amphitheatres. The eight pillars placed in a circular formation within on octagon are derived from the Baptistery of Constantine, (also known as the Baptistery of St John Lateran), a building reconstructed by Palladio in his I quattro libri dell'architettura in 1570.
In this room today are twelve oil paintings of Chiswick House and gardens from the 1930s by Joseph William Topham Vinall. These paintings are of great interest as they show views that no longer exist with several showing the now lost interiors of the two Devonshire wing buildings.

=== Library ===
Echoing the Gallery Rooms located above, the Library is a tripartite arrangement of rooms in octangular, rectangular and circular spatial forms. In the 1740s these rooms were lined with books in English, French, Italian and Latin. There were sections on architecture, antiques, sculpture, history, poetry, geography, fortification, science, divinity, philosophy and exploration. Three copies of the original 1570 publication of Andrea Palladio's I quattro libri dell'architettura were also placed here. Many of these books were housed in specially commissioned cabinets designed by William Kent. Today the Library is devoid of books, the collections having been removed to Chatsworth House, Derbyshire, or in the Royal Institute of British Architects collections, which can be consulted at the Victoria and Albert Museum.

Twelve steps leading from the octagonal section of the Library descend to an octagonal brick cellar vaulted in Early English style. From this cellar wine and beer were raised by dumb waiter to guests on the piano nobile.

=== Lower Link ===
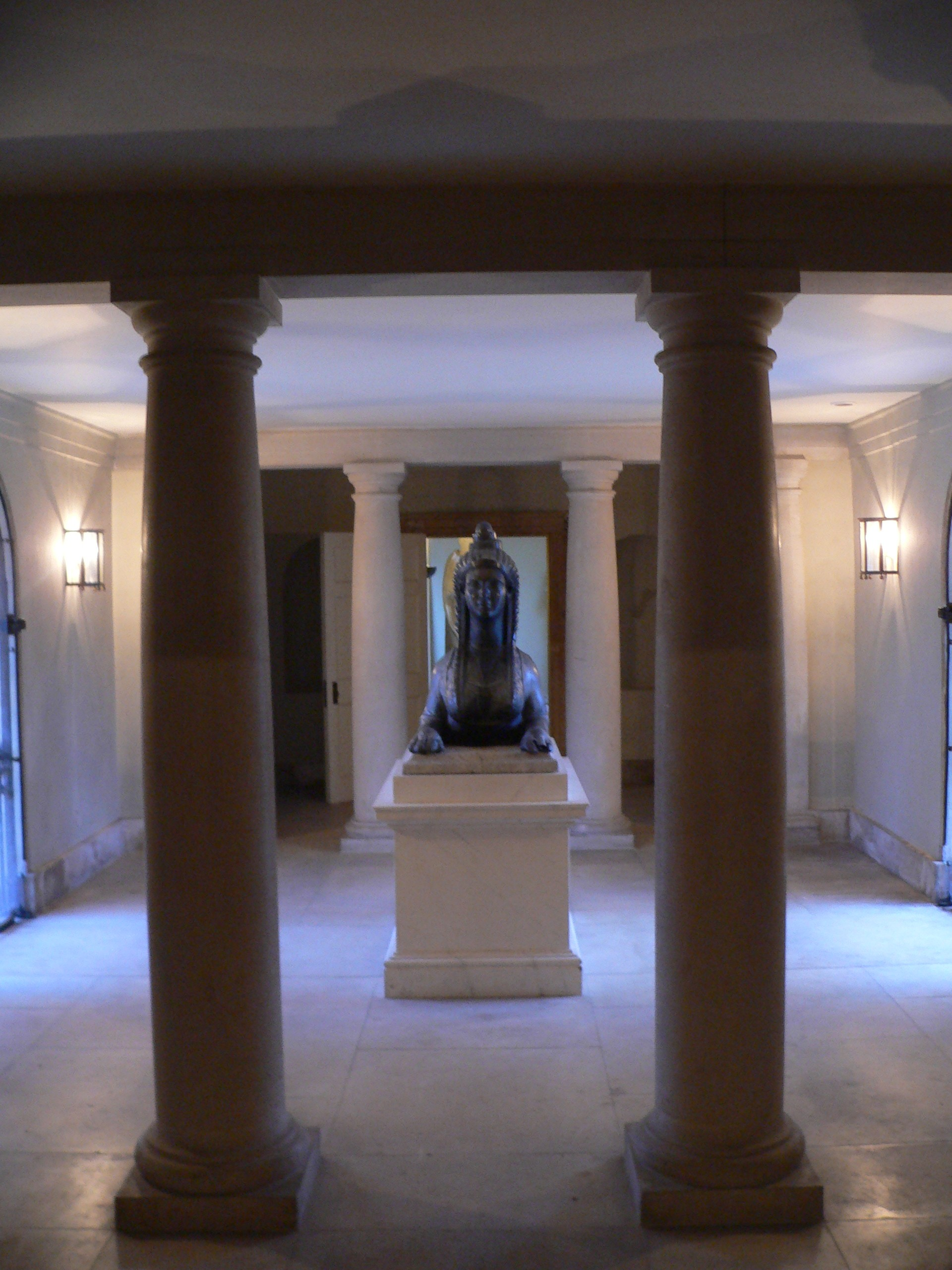
The Lower Link building with a lead sphinx, originally in the garden

The Lower Link Building (Lower Pillared Drawing Room) was built in 1733 to link the Old Jacobean House to the new Villa. This room contained no fireplaces and its doors were open to the elements making this room very cold in the winter. In the four niches classical statues may have been positioned or flowers arranged in the summer. As according to Palladio's recommendations Burlington used two screens of Tuscan columns in this room with the arrangement replicating the tripartite arrangement of Roman Bath Houses. Today a lead Sphinx designed by the celebrated sculptor John Cheere is positioned on a plinth in this room, together with one of the famous Arundel marbles which originally was inset into the base of an obelisk within the gardens and dates from the 3rd century BC.

=== Summer Parlour ===
The Summer Parlour was the most important room on the ground floor of the Villa. Possibly the oldest part of the complex, it was designed around 1715 by either Lord Burlington, Colin Campbell or James Gibbs, who also designed the ‘Pagan Temple’(or 'Heathen' Temple) in the gardens. James Gibbs was sacked by Lord Burlington on the advice of his architectural rival, Colen Campbell. Campbell subsequently took over Gibbs' architectural projects at Chiswick and Burlington House.

This is the only room on this level to have elevated and painted ceilings. Originally designed as a Summer Room for Lady Burlington, in terms of expense the contents of this private room doubled that of any other interior. The ceilings were executed by William Kent in the ‘Grotesque’ style- a mode of painting found predominantly in subterranean Rome and popularised by the artist Raphael. This style, rare in Britain until reintroduced by William Kent at Kensington Palace, consisted of foliage forms interwoven with mythical creatures, such as cherubs or sphinxes.

In the ceiling of the Summer Parlour, Kent also added small owls, a motif that incorporated the owl of the Savile heraldic device. Kent designed two tables with matching mirror frames containing the owl device (the owl was also associated with the owl-faced Roman goddess Minerva, like Lady Burlington a great patroness of the arts). The original elbow chairs in this room were made by Stephen Langley and were unusual in their use of a Greek Key design interspersed with flowers, dated to 1735. Today these large pieces of furniture are situated in the Green Velvet Room. It was in the Summer Parlour that Lady Burlington was taught to paint by William Kent. At the rear of the Summer Parlour was a small china closet for Lady Burlington's most valuable objects. Here would have been stored (and possibly displayed) blue and white export china, famille colored china (red, green, yellow and black), Imari, Meissen and Delft domestic wares.

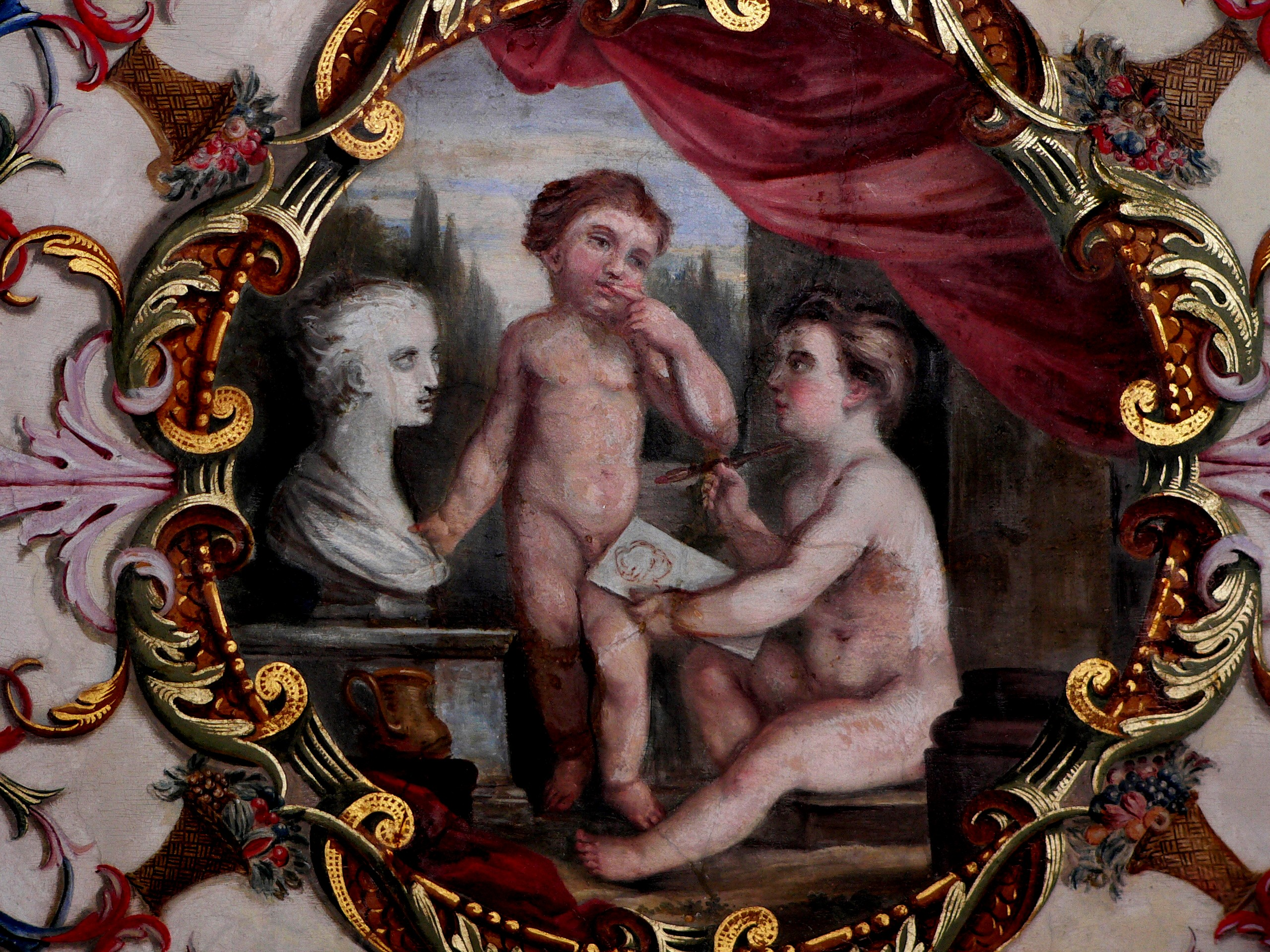
Two putti painting a bust in the ceiling of the Summer Parlour. One putto raises his finger to his lips in a Masonic gesture of silence and secrecy. The bust resembles the Polish Princess Maria Clementina Sobieska.

The central ceiling panel shows a sunflower at the centre, surrounded by four scenes of ports, each framed by shells, a reference to the Roman water goddess Venus and the Egyptian protector of ports and sailors, Isis. The panel nearest the fireplace (in Burlington's time the doorway) depicts two putti, one of whom sketches a female bust. The other holds his finger to his lips illustrating the need for silence.

The historian Jane Clark noted that the female bust bears a resemblance to the Jacobite Queen and Polish Princess Maria Clementina Sobieska, wife of James the Old Pretender. The two putti with reddish hair who accompany her may be representations of the two Stuart Princes living in exile, Charles (Bonnie Prince Charlie- the 'Young Pretender') and Henry Stuart, who were children at the time the painting was executed. In the ceiling painting furthest away from the door the two putti reappear, this time hugging what appears to be a pug dog. The pug dog was a symbol adopted by the 'Society of the Mopses', a European pseudo-Masonic organisation with both male and female members. As a symbol of revolt, the pug dog became particularly important after the publication of Pope Clement XII's Papal Bull In Eminenti in 1738 which condemned Catholic involvement in 'Craft' Freemasonry. As Clark explains, a symbolic initiation of female Freemasons involved the visiting of ports, a ritual which provides a possible link to the four scenes of ports on the ceiling panel. As such the sunflower at the centre would double as a Masonic Blazing Star, echoing the Garter Blazing stars at the centre of the Red Velvet Room ceiling and in the centre of the floor in the Upper Tribunal.

=== Relationship between Villa and Gardens ===
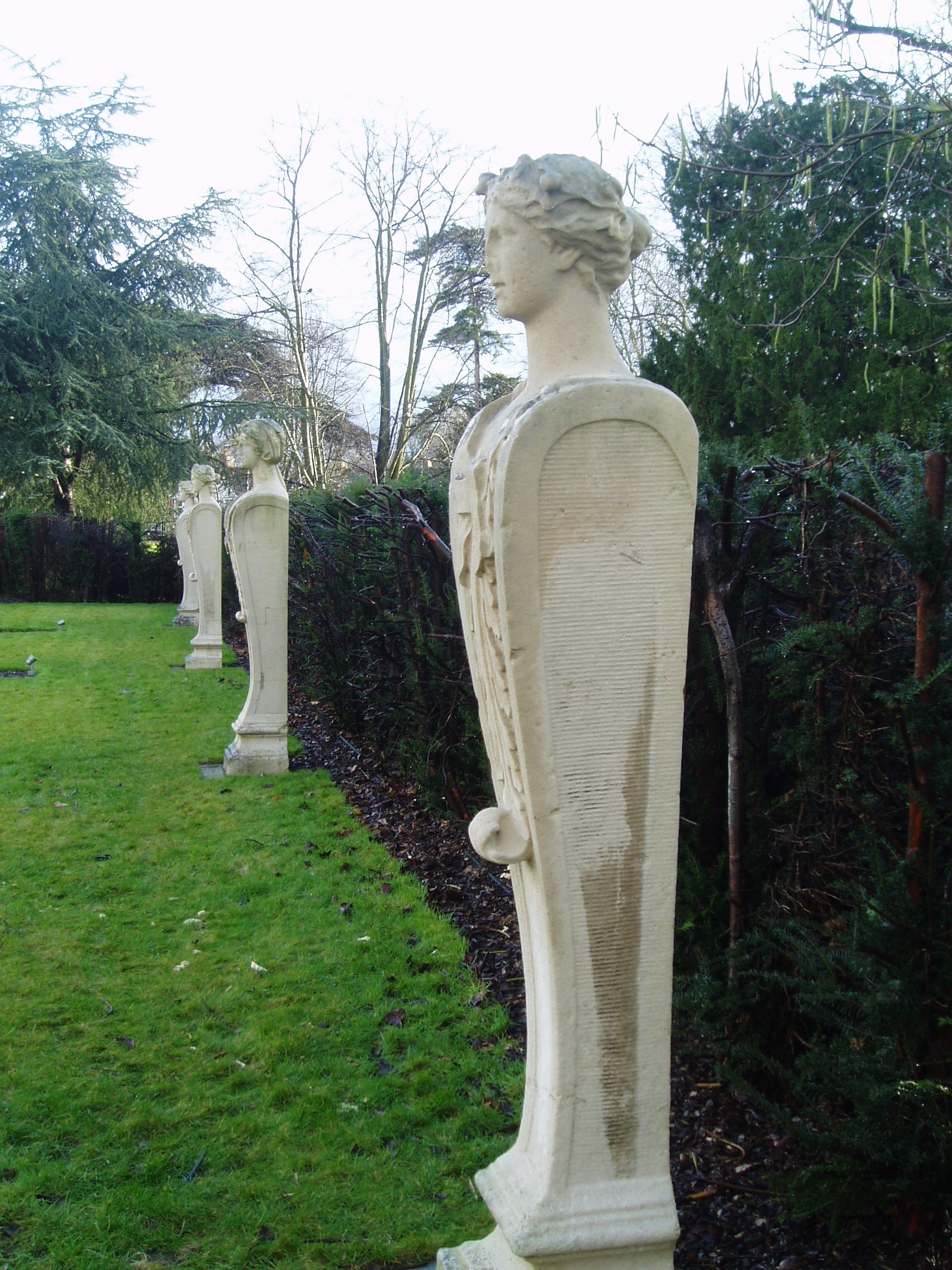
'Term' statues at the front of the Villa

Lord Burlington's use of certain motifs and decorative schemes suggests that he regarded the Villa and its garden as a single entity. Features employed within the Villa are reflected in the garden. For example, the portico of the Villa displays a dado rail, with mock picture frames located above. The concept of a single entity of villa and garden is reinforced with the use of 'thermal' and 'serlian' windows within the Villa to capture natural light, and the positioning of the main staircase on the outside of the Villa. Within the interior of the Villa William Kent painted a plan of the Temple of Fortuna Virilis, the portico of which is reconstructed by Burlington on the Ionic Temple in the Orange Tree Garden. The apses utilised in the Gallery Rooms are likewise reproduced in the garden as terminating features to the two lakes. At the Bowling Green Lord Burlington positioned eight sweet chestnut trees around its perimeter, echoing the eight Tuscan columns located around the circumference of the Lower Tribune. To Burlington the primitive Tuscan order was associated with the use of trees as columns in ancient buildings. It is through such designs that Lord Burlington attempted to break down the barriers between man-made architecture and the architecture of nature. This philosophy was vaguely similar to Andrea Palladio's approach to his Villas in Vicenza, many of which had a semi-agricultural purpose, with the ground floor used for domestic and commercial activities, and the piano noble used for entertainment.
