= Skirpenbeck =

Village and civil parish in the East Riding of Yorkshire, England

Coordinates: 54.003636°N 0.862110°W

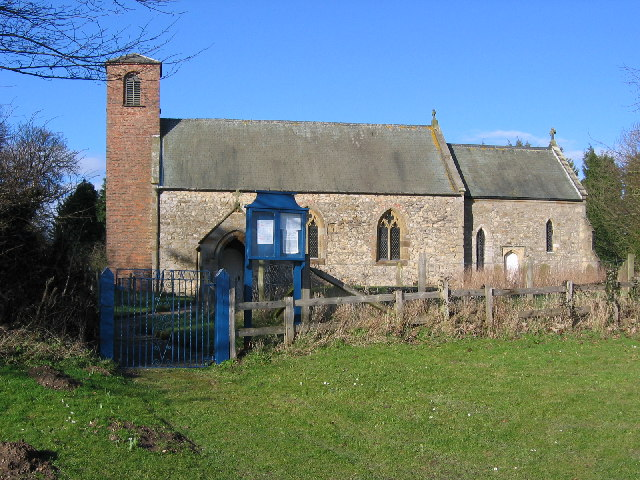
- St Mary's Church at Skirpenbeck

- Location within the East Riding of Yorkshire
- Population: 192 (2011 census)
- OS grid reference: SE746570
- Civil parish: Skirpenbeck
- Unitary authority: East Riding of Yorkshire
- Ceremonial county: East Riding of Yorkshire
- Region: Yorkshire and the Humber
- Country: England
- Sovereign state: United Kingdom
- Post town: YORK
- Postcode district: YO41
- Dialling code: 01759
- Police: Humberside
- Fire: Humberside
- Ambulance: Yorkshire
- UK Parliament: Bridlington and The Wolds

Skirpenbeck is a village and civil parish in the East Riding of Yorkshire, England. It is situated 2 miles (3.2 km) north-west of Stamford Bridge just north of the A166 road.

According to the 2011 UK census, Skirpenbeck parish had a population of 192, an increase on the 2001 UK census figure of 142. In 2019 this was estimated to be 304.

The place-name 'Skirpenbeck' is first attested in the Domesday Book of 1086, where it appears as Scarpenbec. It derives from the Old Norse skerping and bekkr, meaning barren land by a beck or stream.

Skirpenbeck is near Stamford Bridge, over the River Derwent, near where King Harold of England defeated Harald Hardrada King of Norway in 1066. Its first baron was Sir William de Chauncy, son of Chauncy de Chauncy.

Unusually for a village there are a still number of working farms in the village, some of which have been farmed by the same families for generations. There are currently 7 working farms in the village.

The parish church of St Mary's is a Grade II* listed building.

There are markings on the church building (near the bell tower) that appear to be Saxon runes.

The village has also had some notable residents:

Alick Walker the palaeontologist was born in Skirpenbeck.

Thomas Cooke the machinist was the school Headmaster in Skirpenbeck where he also created precision scientific instruments such as microscopes and telescopes.

Frederick James Lloyd, more commonly known as James Lloyd, was an English artist. He became famous for his paintings, mostly of animals and country landscapes. He was the first living self-taught artist to have a painting hung at the Tate in London, titled Cat and Mouse. He and his family moved to Skirpenbeck in 1950 where he took on the job as a cowman. There were now so many paintings, laboriously constructed dot by dot (pointillism). His wife Nancy decided it was time that Lloyd's work was seen by more people. Without telling her husband she wrote to Sir Herbert Read and he paid Lloyd a visit to see his paintings, and bought a couple of them. Herbert Read sent some to various galleries in London.

In 1958 Lloyd held his first one-man show at (the late) Arthur Jeffress Gallery in London. All but 2 of the 32 paintings being held were sold within hours of opening.

== Governance ==
The parish has a joint parish council with Full Sutton, known as the Parish Council of Full Sutton and Skirpenbeck.

== See also ==
- Listed buildings in Skirpenbeck
