= Diocletian window =

Architectural feature of Ancient Roman baths

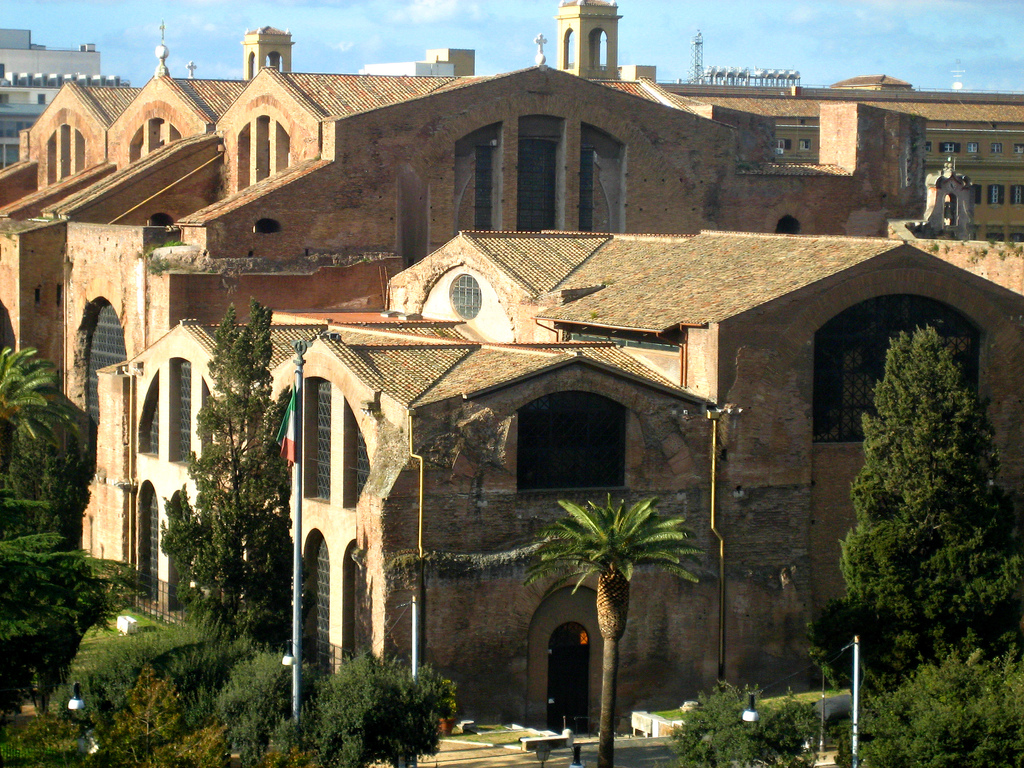
The Baths of Diocletian in Rome with three-light “Diocletian windows” visible.

Diocletian windows, also called thermal windows, are large semicircular windows characteristic of the enormous public baths (thermae) of Ancient Rome. They have been revived on a limited basis by some classical revivalist architects in more modern times.

== Description ==
Diocletian windows are large segmental arched windows (or other openings), which are usually divided into three lights (window compartments) by two vertical mullions. The central compartment is often wider than the two side lights on either side of it.

== Names ==
Diocletian windows are named after the windows found in the Baths of Diocletian (AD 302) in Rome. (The Thermae is now the church of Santa Maria degli Angeli e dei Martiri.) The variant name, thermal window, also comes from their association with the Thermae of Diocletian.

== Influence ==
This type of window was revived and used in Italy in the 16th century, especially by Andrea Palladio. Palladio and others incorporated an elongated Diocletian window in the form of an arched central light flanked by narrower, square-headed apertures. This combination became known as a Venetian window.

The Diocletian window was much used in the early 18th century by the English architect Richard Boyle, one of the originators of the English Palladian style, and by his followers.

Diocletian windows continued to be used occasionally in large public buildings in the various devolutions of Neoclassical architecture including the Beaux Arts movement (1880–1920).

== Gallery ==
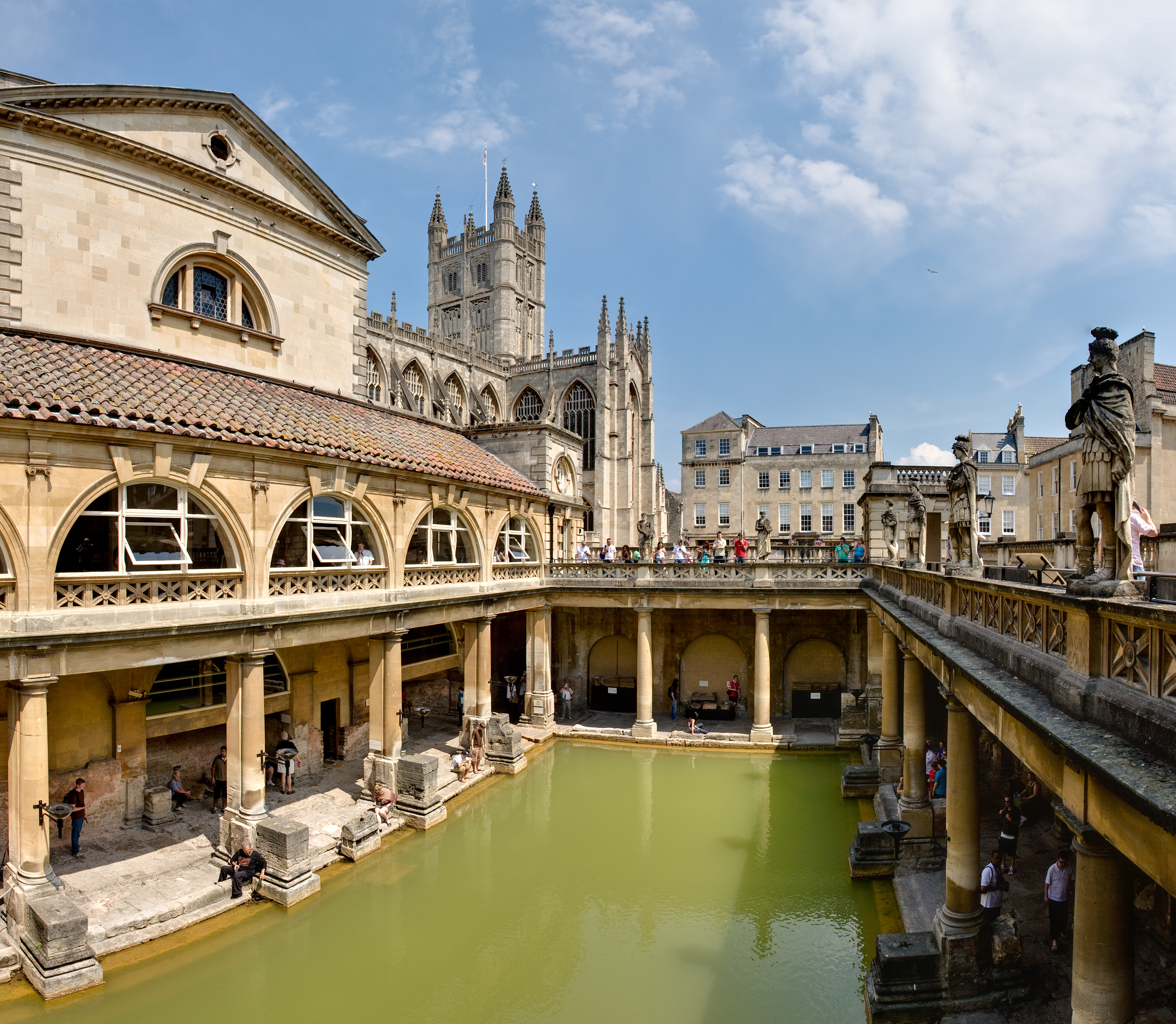
Roman Baths in Bath, Somerset, built ca 70 CE (used until the 4th–5th ct.)

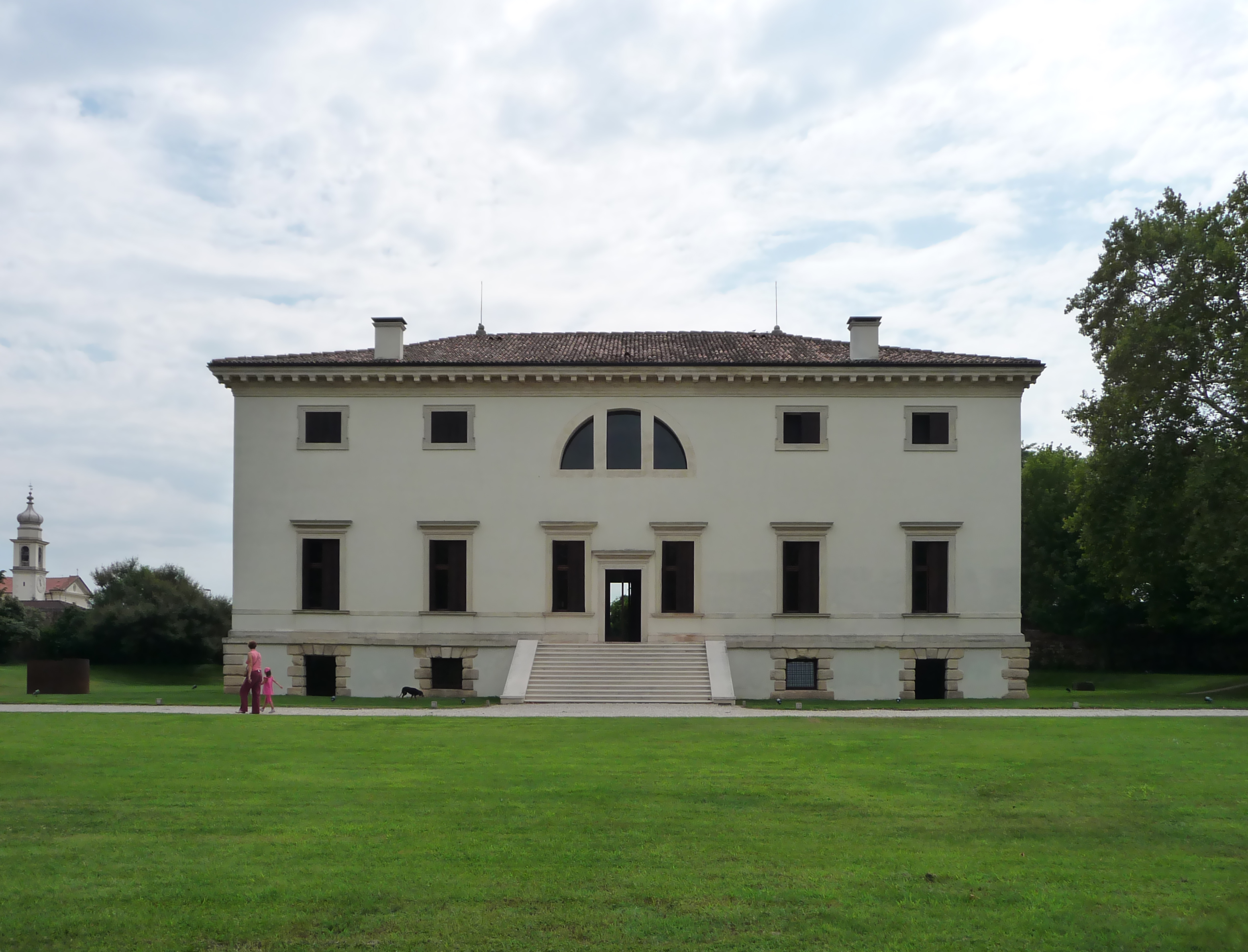
Villa Pisani, Bagnolo, by Palladio, rear facade (1540s)

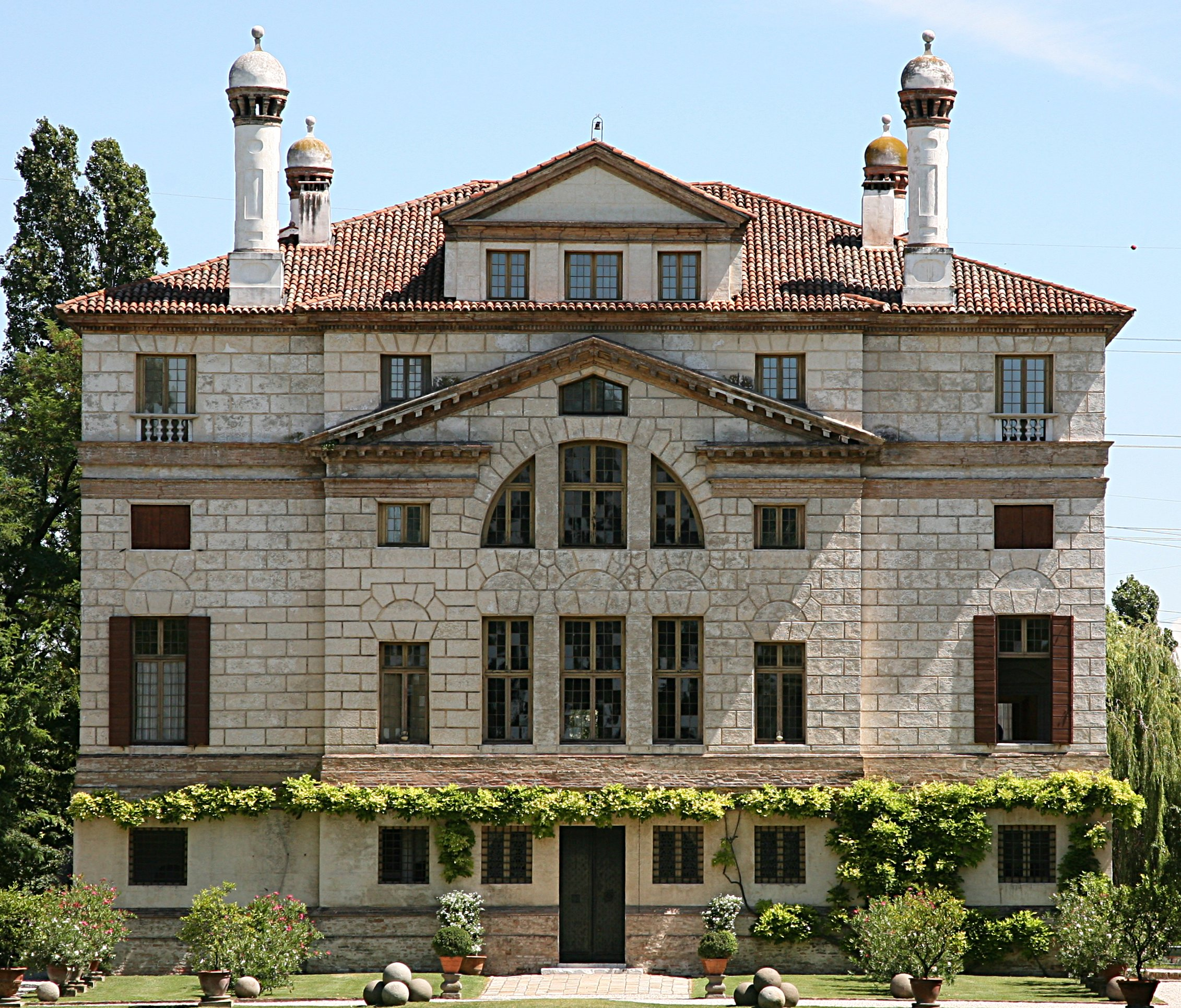
Villa Foscari, Mira (near Venice), by Andrea Palladio, rear facade (mid 1550s)

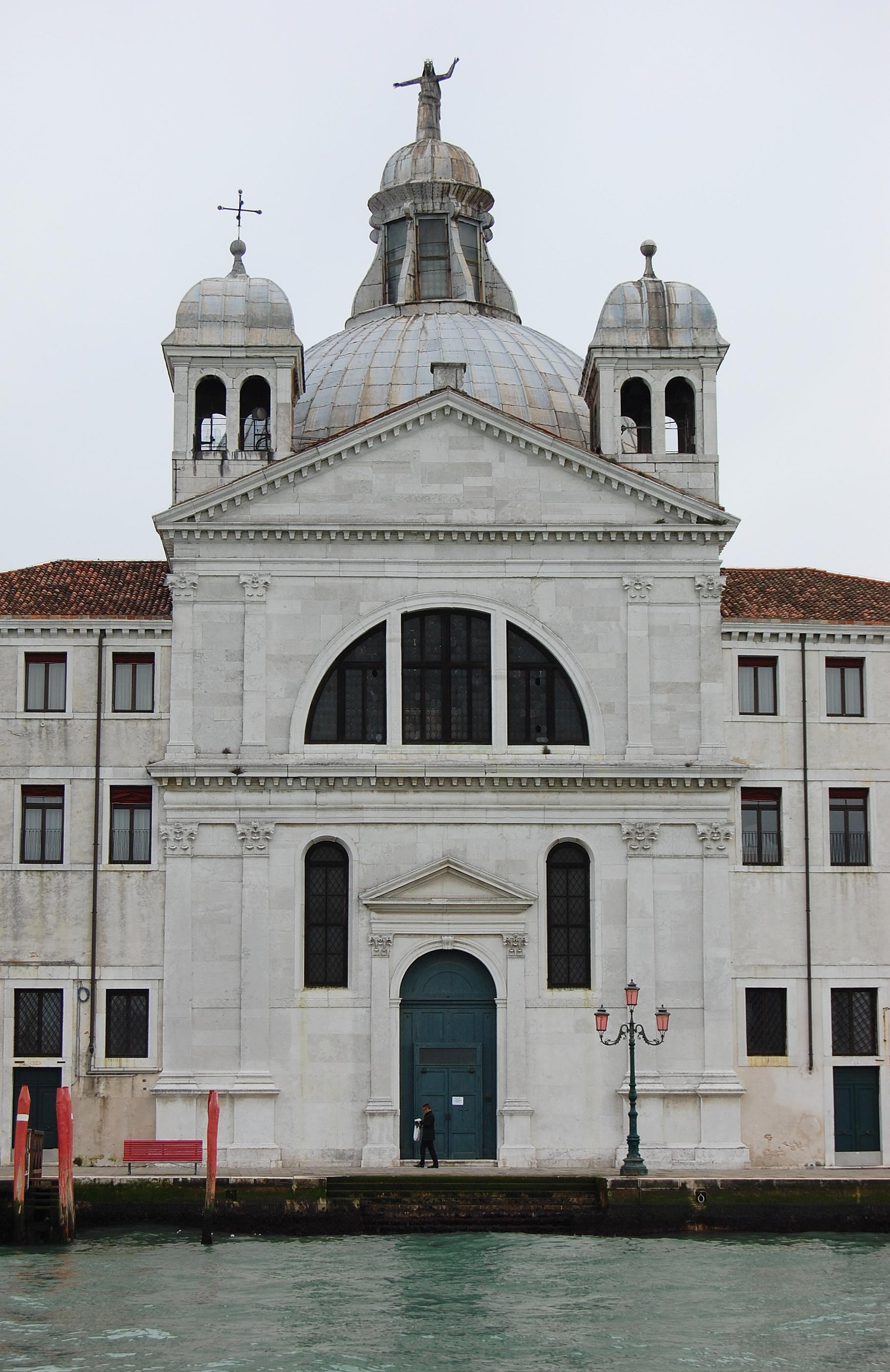
Chiesa delle Zitelle, Venice, attributed to Palladio (1581)

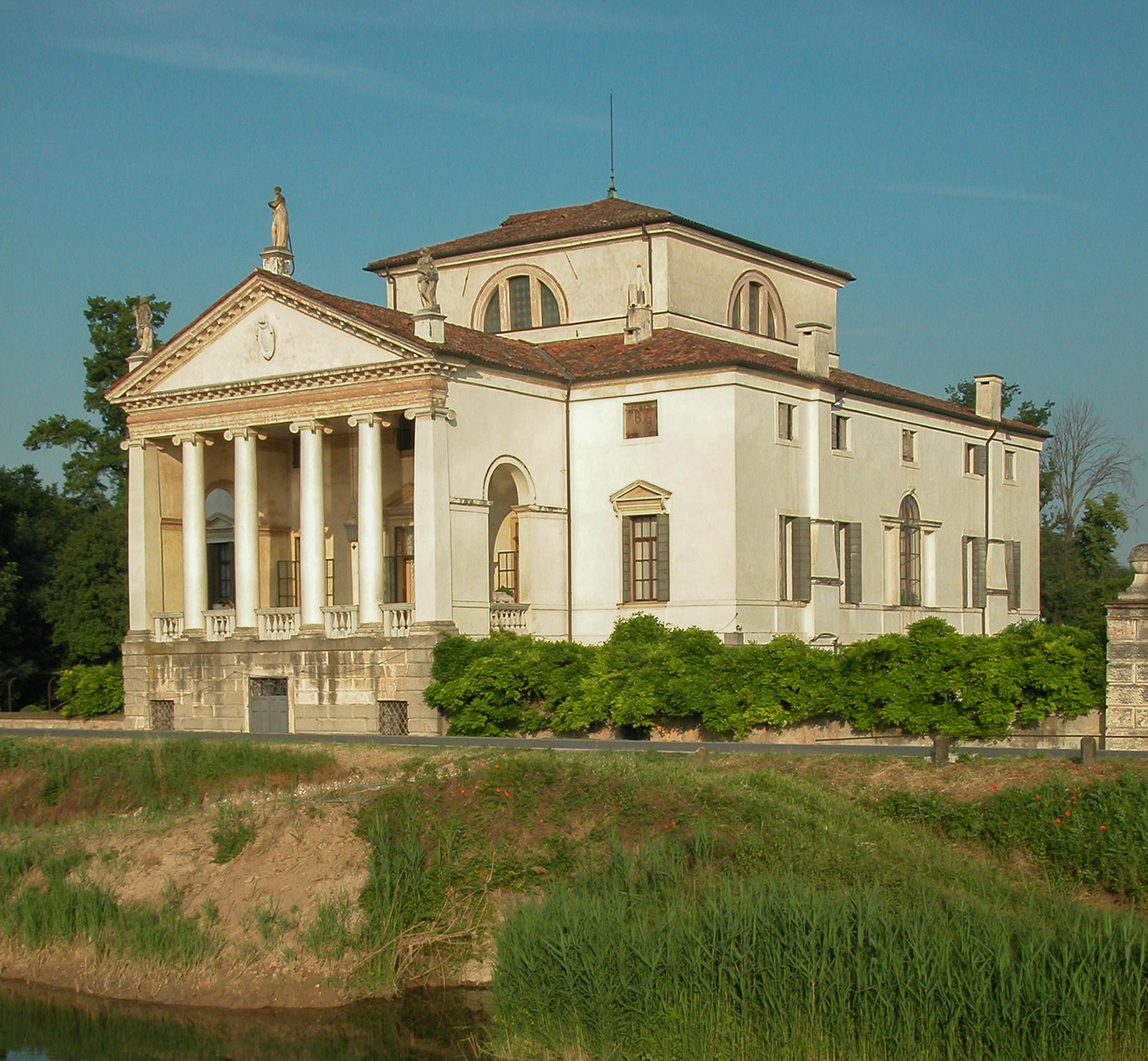
Villa Molin, near Padua, designed by Vincenzo Scamozzi (completed 1597)

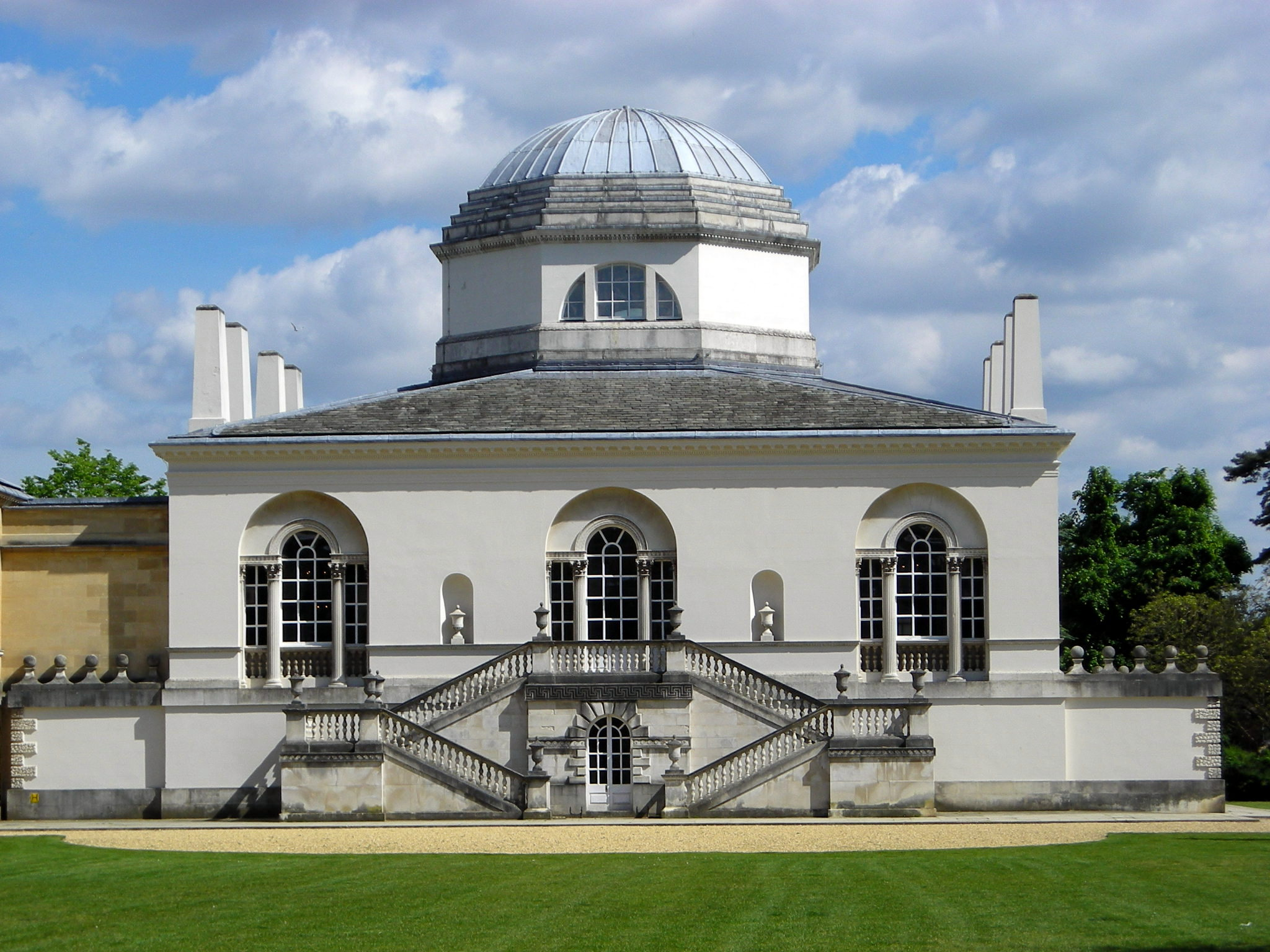
Lord Burlington's Chiswick House (1727–29), London Hounslow

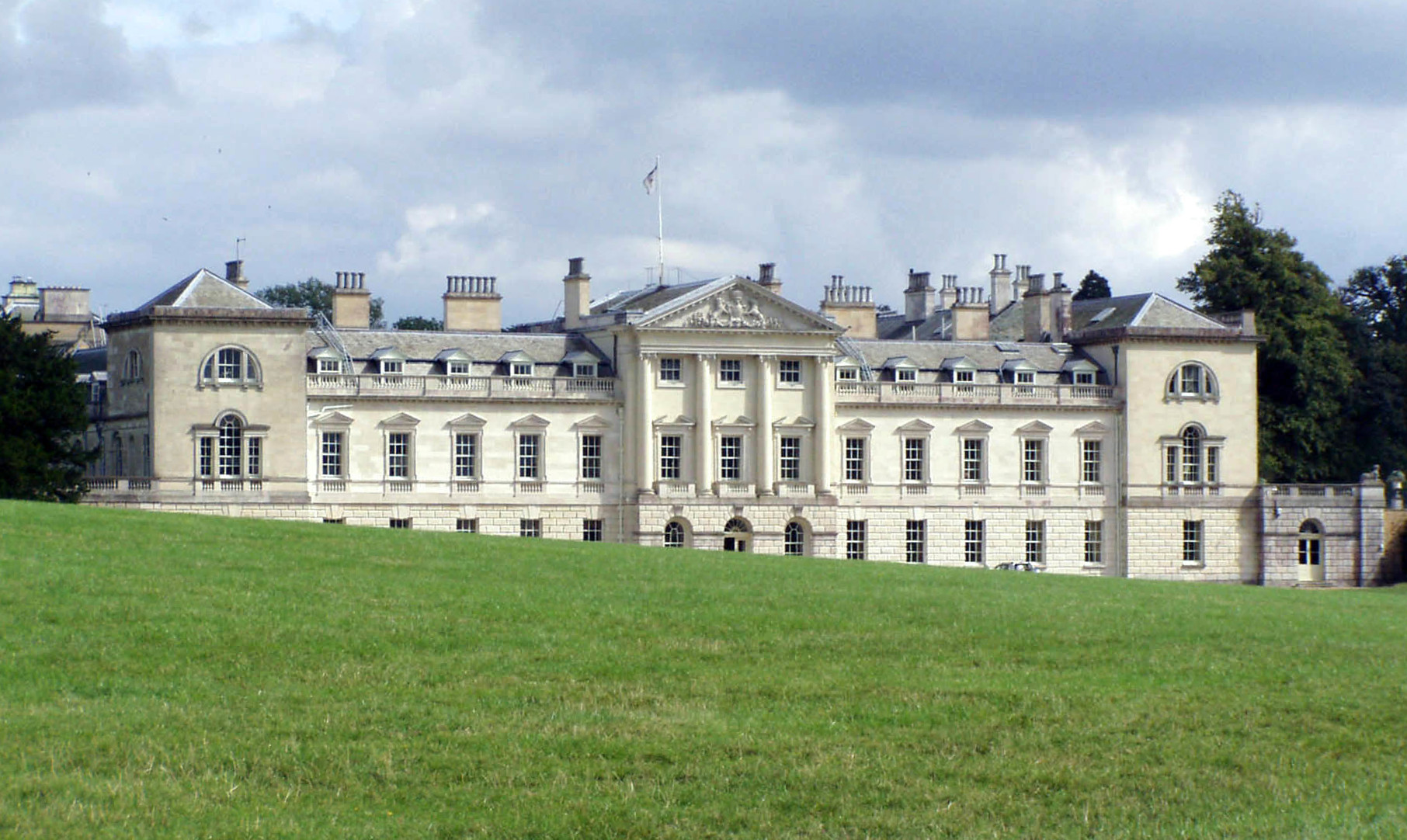
Woburn Abbey, Bedfordshire (England), 12th-century Cistercians abbey remodeled by Henry Flitcroft and John Sanderson (1747–1761)

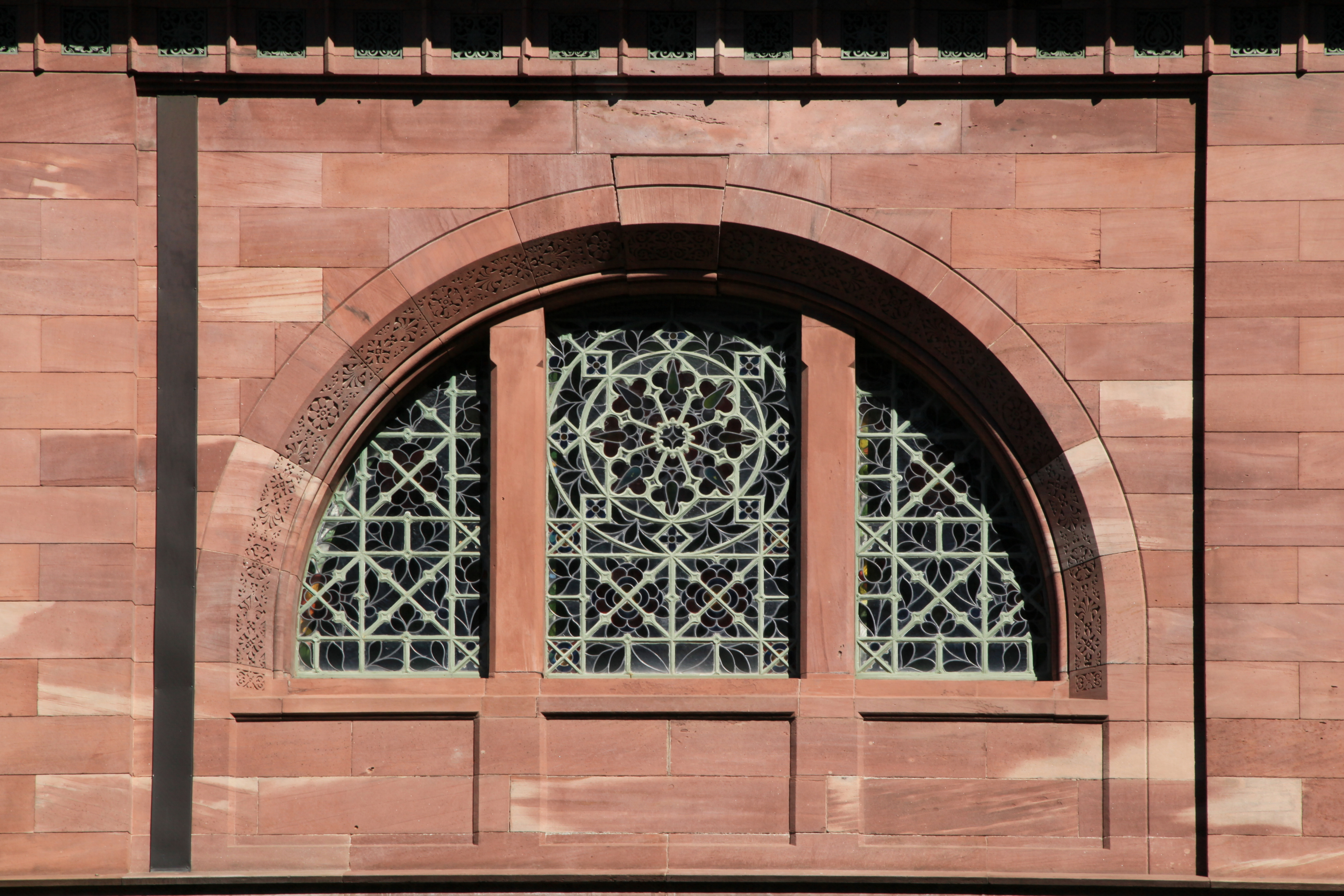
Palais Thermal (1847), Bad Wildbad, Germany

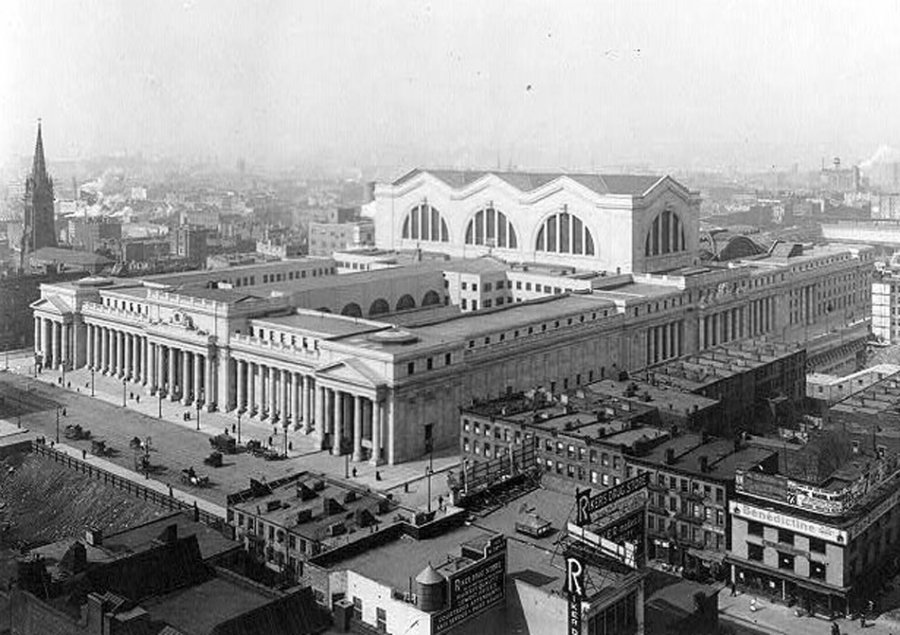
A five-light variant of the thermal window is seen on the old Penn Station in New York City (ca. 1911).

== See also ==
- Trifora
