= Tolentini, Venice =

Church building in Venice, Italy

Coordinates: 45.4374°N 12.3221°E

Church of San Nicolò da Tolentino
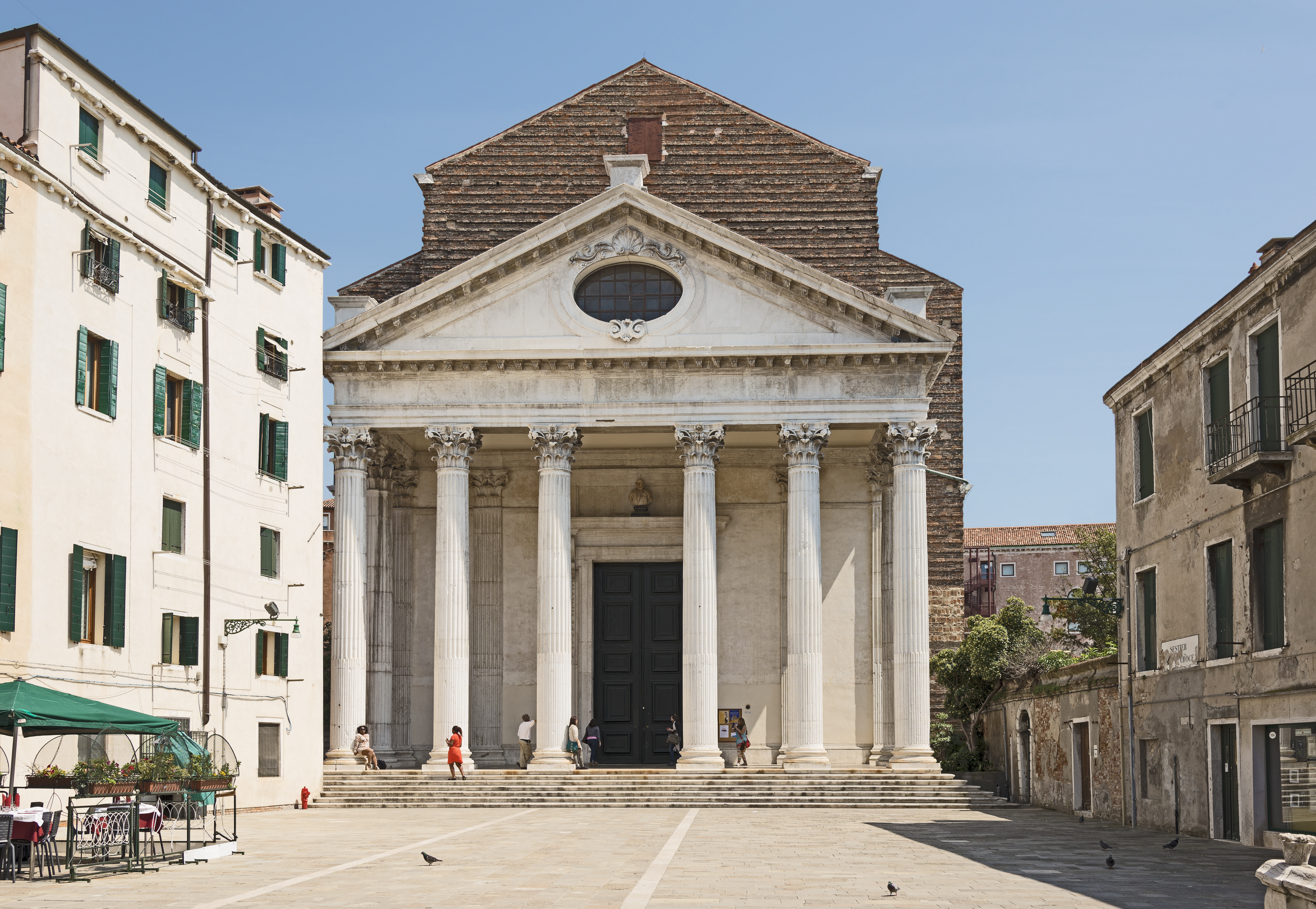
- Facade on Campo dei Tolentini.

- Location within Venice Location within Italy

Religion
- Affiliation: Roman Catholic
- Province: Venice

Location
- Location: Venice, Italy

Architecture
- Architects: Vincenzo Scamozzi and Andrea Tirali
- Type: Church
- Completed: 1714

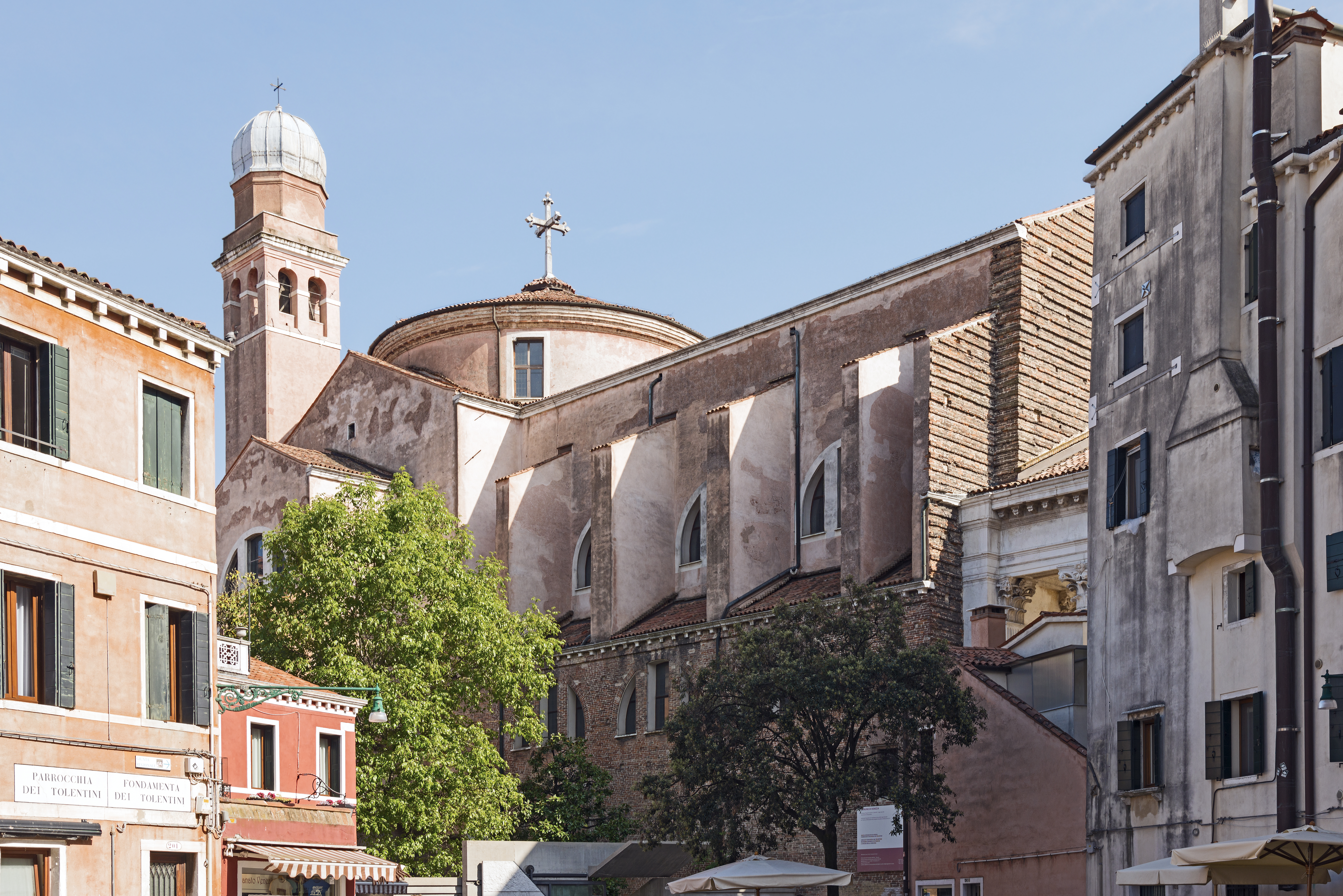
The north side of the church and the campanile.

The Chiesa di San Nicolò da Tolentino, commonly known as the Tolentini, is a church in the sestiere of Santa Croce in Venice, northern Italy. It lies in a Campo of the same name and along the Rio dei Tolentini, near the Giardino Papadopoli.

== History ==
The Theatines arrived in Venice in 1527 after the Sack of Rome. The church dedicated to Saint Nicholas of Tolentino was begun in 1590 by Vincenzo Scamozzi. The relationship between Scamozzi and his patrons was stormy, and the church was finally completed only in 1714. It is a large church with a huge freestanding Corinthian portico, the only one in Venice, designed by Andrea Tirali.

The Tolentini is a parish church of the Vicariate of San Polo-Santa Croce-Dorsoduro. The church contains the tomb of Doge Giovanni I Corner, Francesco Corner, Giovanni II Corner, and Paolo Renier. The baroque organ was constructed by Pietro Nacchini in 1754.

Annexed to the church was the monastery, now site of the architecture university of Ca’ Foscari. In 1966 Carlo Scarpa worked on creating an entrance for the institute.

== Works of art ==
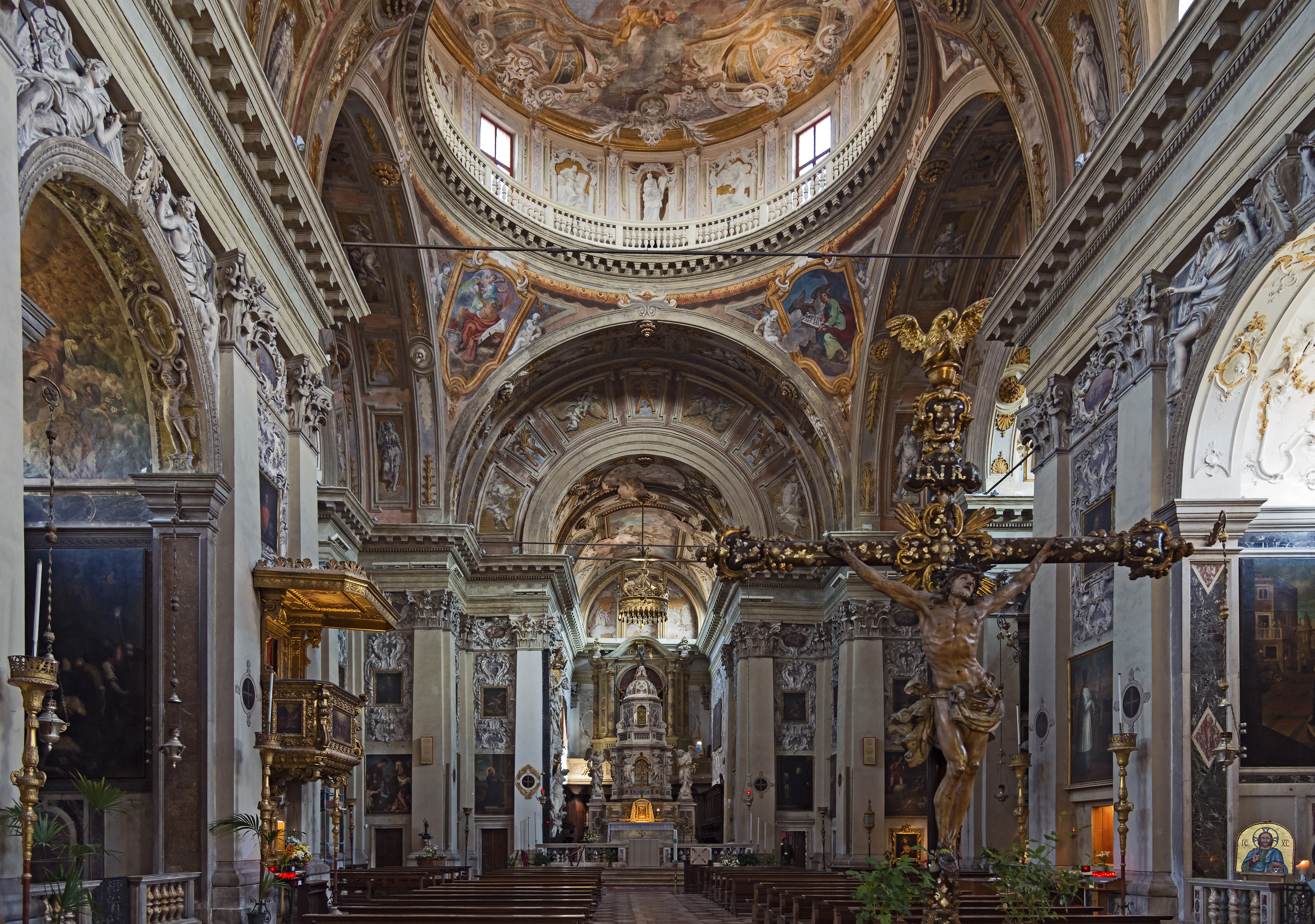
San Nicola da Tolentino

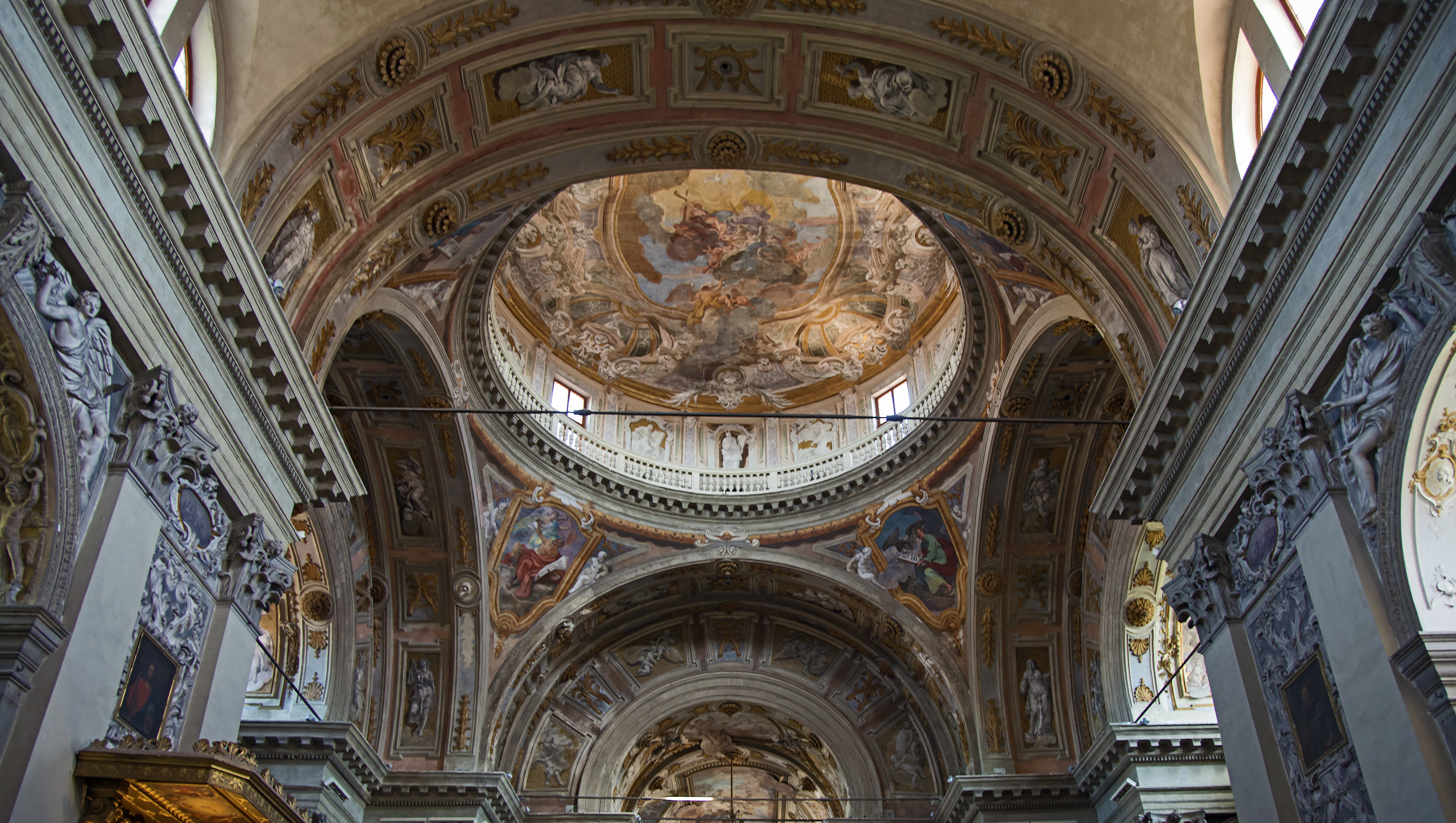
Ceiling by Mattia Bortoloni

The high altar is by Baldassare Longhena. In 1627, Johann Liss painted a large altarpiece, the Inspiration of Saint Jerome to the left of chancel. In 1629 Bernardo Strozzi painted St Lawrence Giving Alms for the chancel.

The funereal monument of the Patriarch of Venice, Giovan Francesco Morosini (d.1678) in the chancel, was completed by the Genovese sculptor Filippo Parodi.
