= Nicolò Molin =

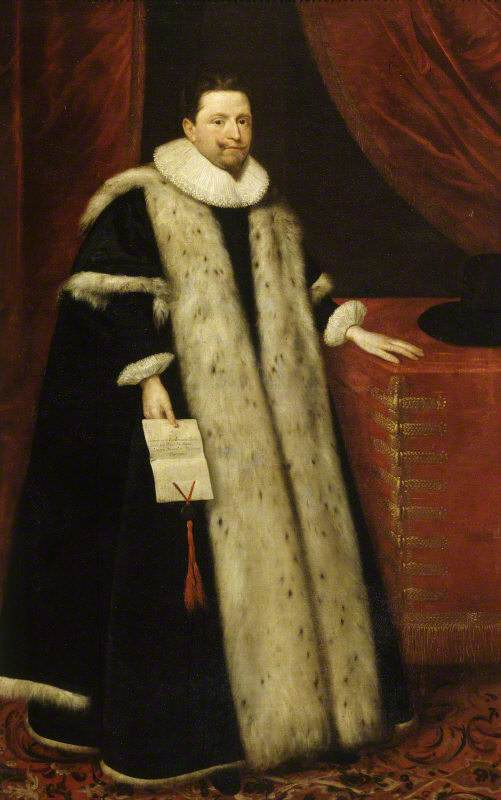
Nicolò Molino, by Daniël Mijtens, Knole

Nicolò Molin (1562-1608) was a Venetian noble and ambassador to England.

The main residence of the Molin family in Venice was the Palazzo Molin del Cuoridoro.

He commissioned the architect Vincenzo Scamozzi to build the Villa Molin near Padua for him in 1597.

He was ambassador in England from November 1603 to January 1606. In November 1603 he travelled with Piero Duodo to Wilton House for an audience with King James, Anne of Denmark, and Prince Henry. Molin wrote to the Doge of Venice, Marino Grimani that James was dressed in cloak of marten fur, and his costume was otherwise the same as that in a portrait of the king at Venice. The Venetian ambassadors stayed at Salisbury and had further audiences at Wilton. They spoke to Anne of Denmark who was seated under a canopy embroidered with jewels and strings of pearls. Prince Henry came to dinner at their lodging in Salisbury which Molin considered a great honour.

Molin described the royal Entry to London in March 1604, which had been delayed because of plague, but he did not attend because of quarrels in the diplomatic community about precedence. At the Accession day tilt or tournament, three equivalent spectators' boxes were built for the ambassadors of Spain, France, and Venice, but the diplomats contended over which seat was the place of honour.

Molin thought the new Stuart court was filled with corruption and discontent, and he reported that in his first ten months he had heard many conversations that revolved around gifts and presents. He disapproved of King James's enthusiasm for hunting, as he was frequently absent from London leaving the business of government to courtiers and councillors.

Molin and the queen's brother, the Duke of Holstein had a disagreement over precedence at the wedding of the Earl of Montgomery and Susan Vere on 27 December 1604. The Duke sat in Molin's place of honour opposite Prince Henry. Molin felt the Duke still held a grudge against him when he left England without paying him a courtesy visit. In June 1605, after his two brothers had died, Molin began the process of resigning as ambassador, and Zorzi Giustinian was named as his successor.

Anne of Denmark, who seemed to be interested in learning the language, enjoyed hearing Molin speaking Italian. King James knighted Molin and in January 1606 allowed him to augment his coat of arms with a "canton". The news letter writer John Pory, after describing the performance of the court masque Hymenaei, mentioned that Molin introduced the new ambassador Zorzi Giustinian; "the old Venetian lieger, Molino, presented to the king and Prince a new lieger, Justiniano. I say 'to the prince' because they delivered a letter from the Signory to him as well as to the King. They came to court in thirteen coaches, they were apparalled in black gowns, lined with the richest fur of all others, black fox". King James gave him a gift of gilt plate, made by his goldsmith John Williams.

Molin was granted an English coat of arms featuring the wheel of a watermill, punning on his name. He gave Anne of Denmark a gold ring with an aquamarine with the motto "Una gota de aqui de molyne", meaning a drop of water from the mill.

Molin wrote a relation or discourse on the politics and the court of King James in 1607, giving frank opinions on several courtiers. In the relazione Molin said King James criticised Prince Henry for not being as diligent as the Duke of York in his studies. Molin thought James was jealous of the Prince's popularity.

In 1607 he married Maria Grimani, a daughter of the Doge, Marino Grimani and his wife Morosina Morosini, and widow of Alvise Grimani.

He died on 9 May 1608. His widow married Lorenzo Giustinian.

A posthumous portrait of the ambassador was painted by Daniël Mijtens, and is now at Knole, where a bedroom is supposed to have been used by Molin.

Inigo Jones and the Earl of Arundel visited the Villa Molin in 1614 and its design influenced the Queen's House at Greenwich and Jones' designs for the Prince's Lodging at Newmarket.
