= Andrea Tirali =

Italian architect

Andrea Tirali (around 1660–1737) was an Italian architect working in Venice and the Veneto. He was responsible for the intricate design of the pavement in the Piazza San Marco in Venice (from 1723).

In the Basilica of Saints Giovanni e Paolo, Venice, he built the chapel of St Dominic (1700-20) and the elaborate tomb of the Valier doges (c. 1704–07). He designed the portico to Vincenzo Scamozzi's San Nicolò di Tolentino (1706-14) and the facade of S. Vidal (c. 1725–35). Other works in Venice include the Ponte dei Tre Archi at Cannaregio (1688), Scuola dell'Angelo Custode at Santi Apostoli (1713), Palazzo Priuli (later Manfrin Venier; 1724–31), the Palazzo Diedo (between 1710 and 1720) and the staircase of Ca' Sagredo (c. 1734).

He is the architect of the Villa Morosini (later Vendramin Calergi) at Fiesso Umbertiano (from 1706) and possibly Villa Sceriman (later Widmann Foscari Rezzonico; 1719) at Mira.

From 1700, he built the bell tower of San Martino in Burano. He also designed the church of SS. Trinità (1703-07) and the Palazzo Grassi (1703-14) in Chioggia as well as the nearby Santuario of S.Maria di San Vito (1717-23) at Pellestrina.

He died suddenly at Monselice in 1737 while building a new wing to Scamozzi's Villa Duodo (completed in 1740).

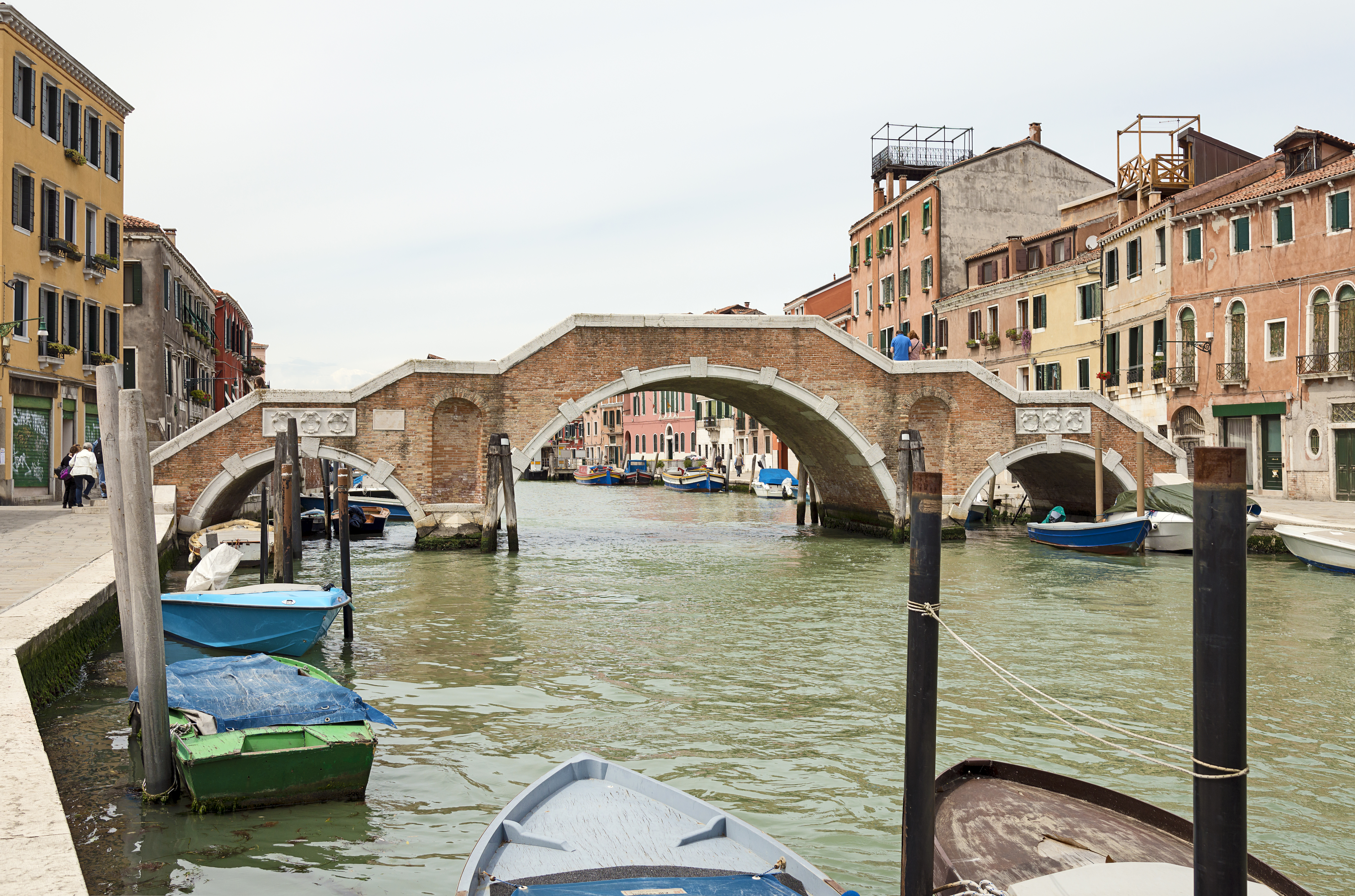
Ponte dei Tre Archi

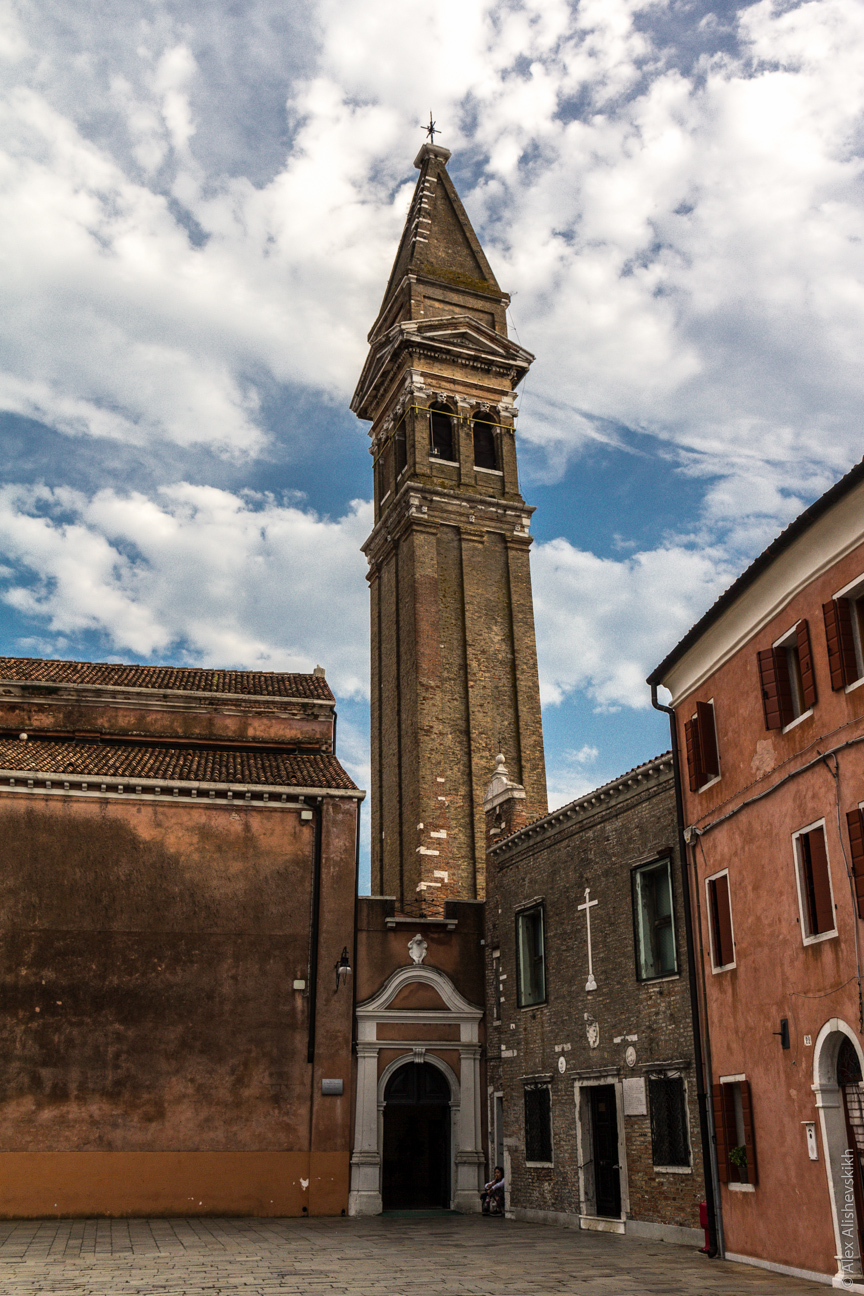
Campanile, Burano

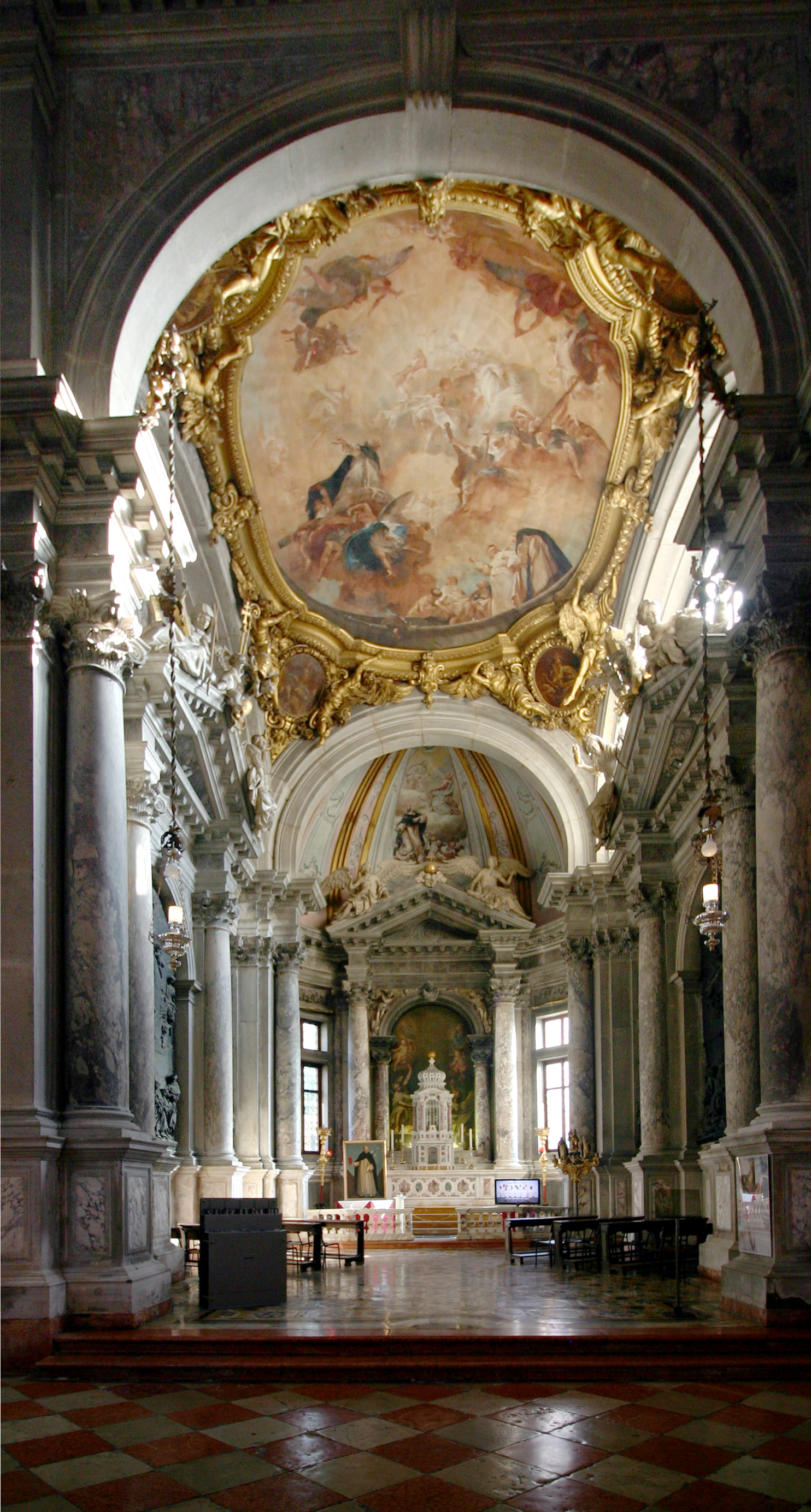
Chapel of Saint Dominic, Santi Giovanni e Paolo, Venice

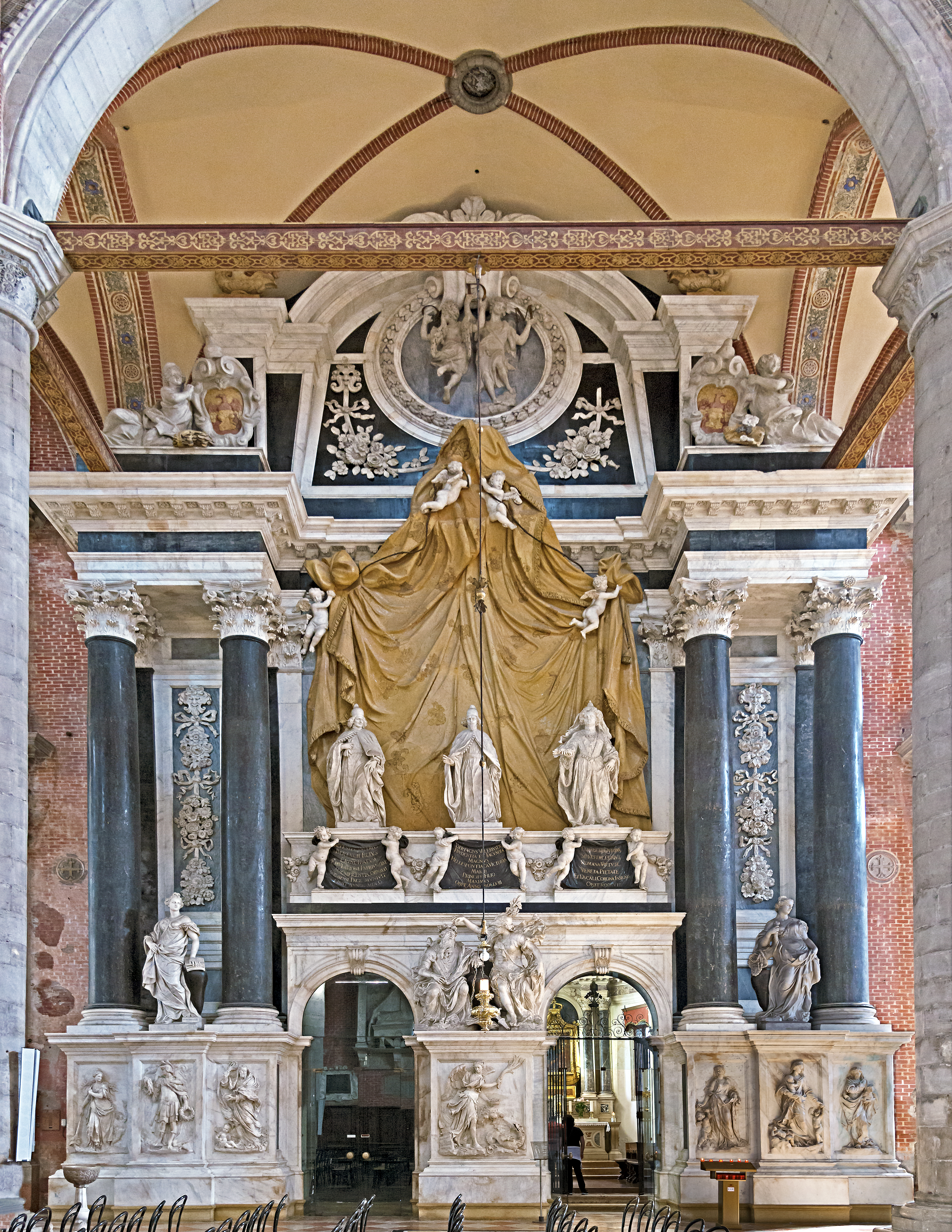
Valier tomb, Santi Giovanni e Paolo, Venice

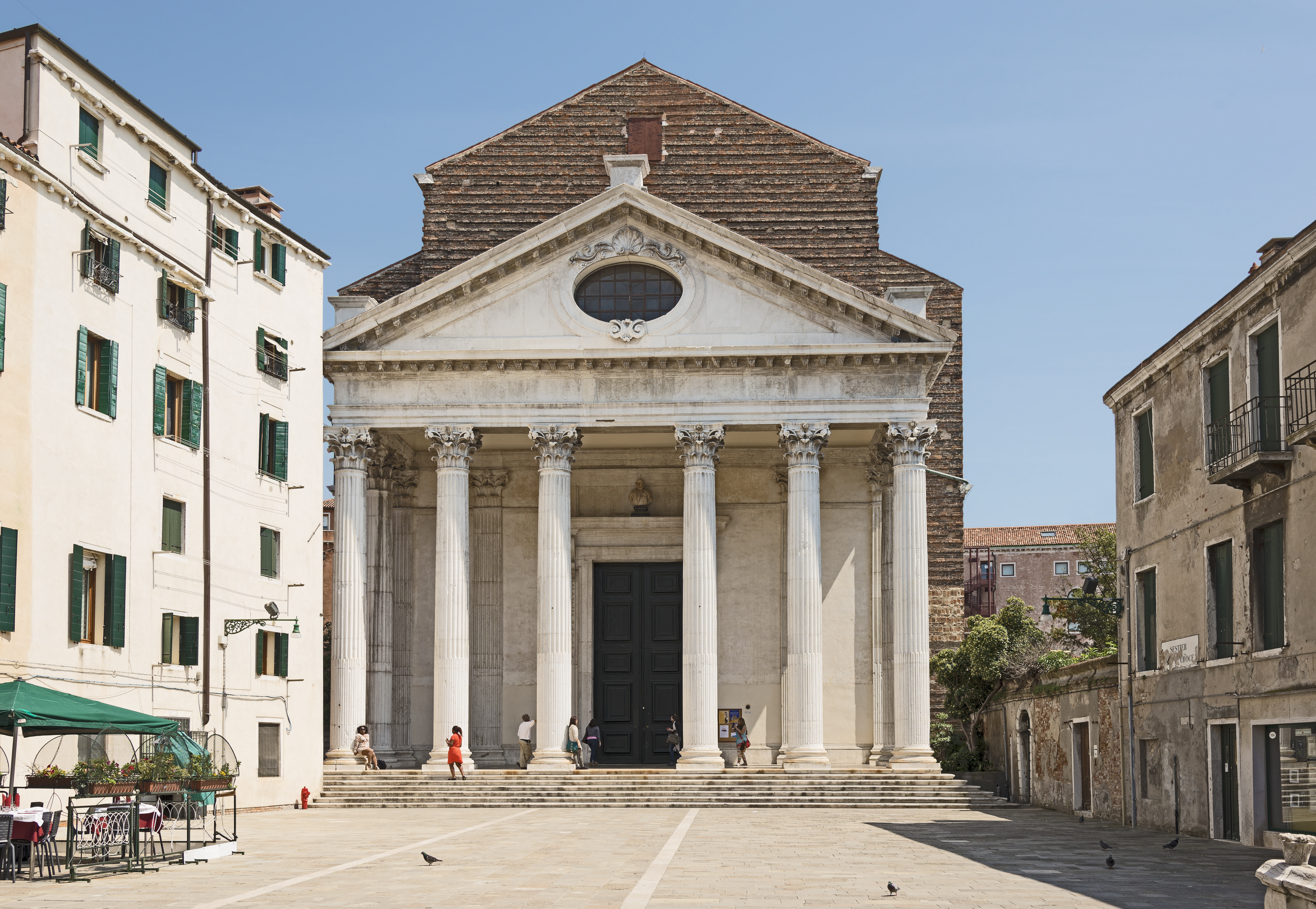
Facade portico of San Nicolò di Tolentino (Venice)

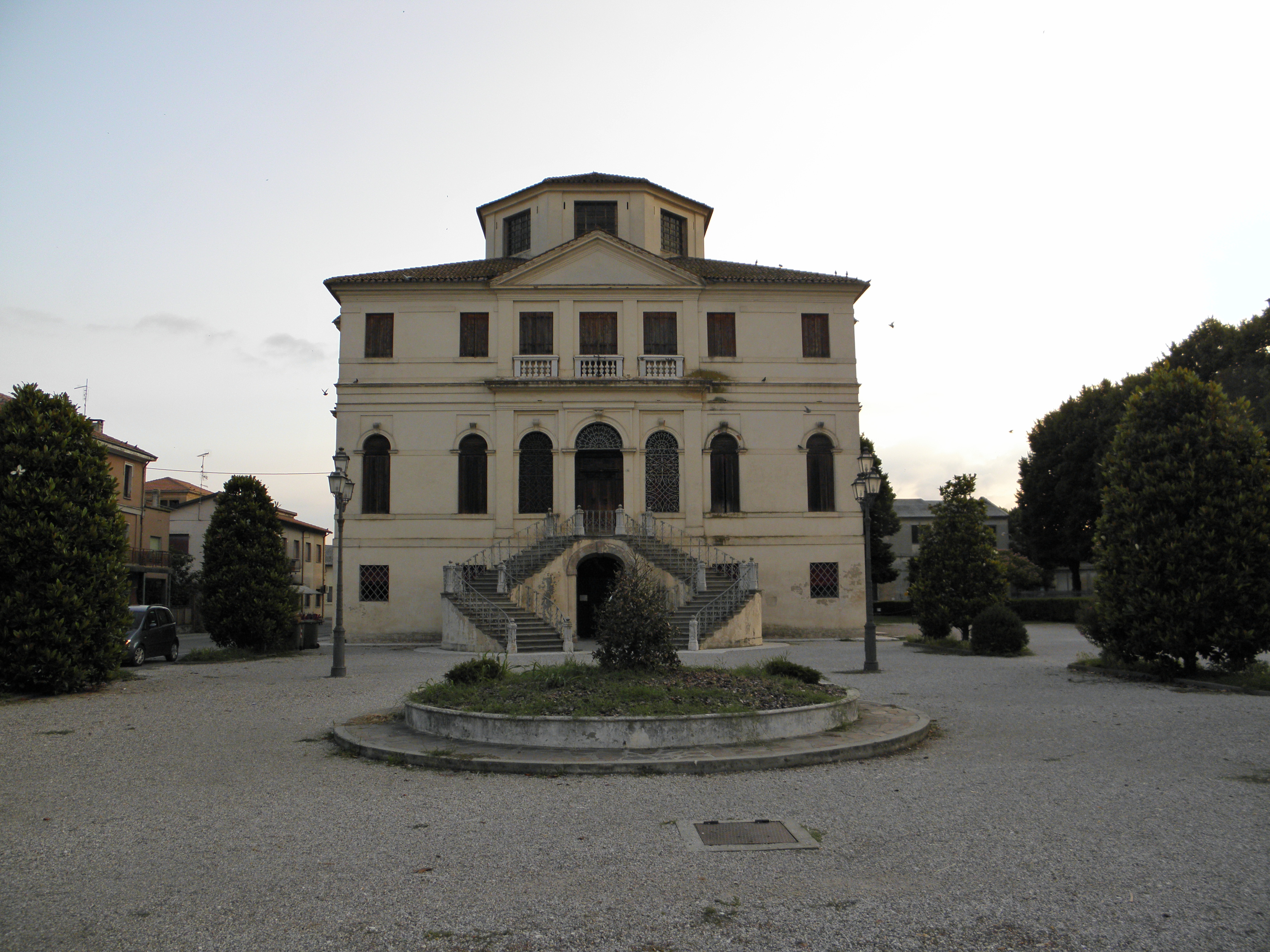
Villa Morosini, Fiesso Umbertiano

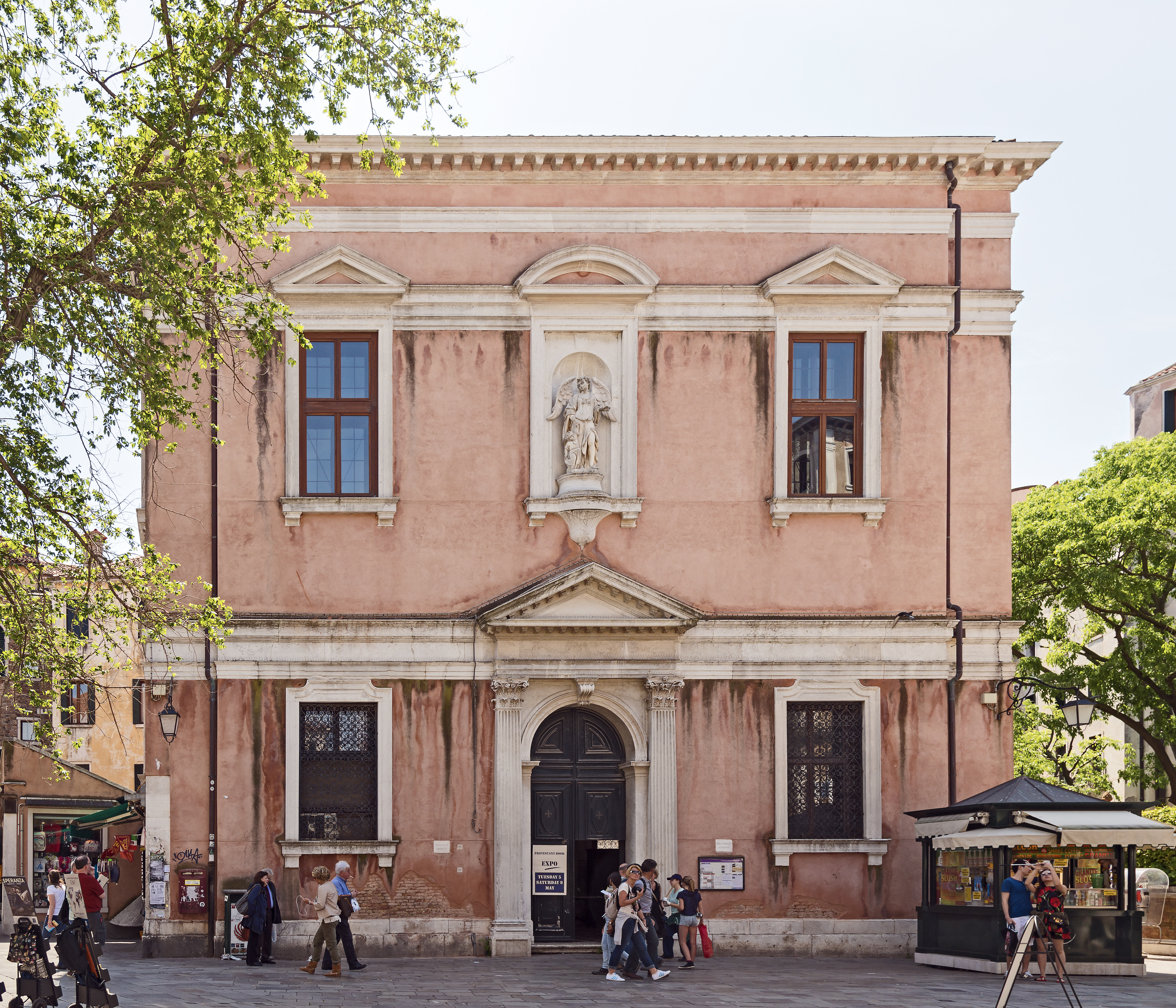
Scuola dell'Angelo Custode, Venice

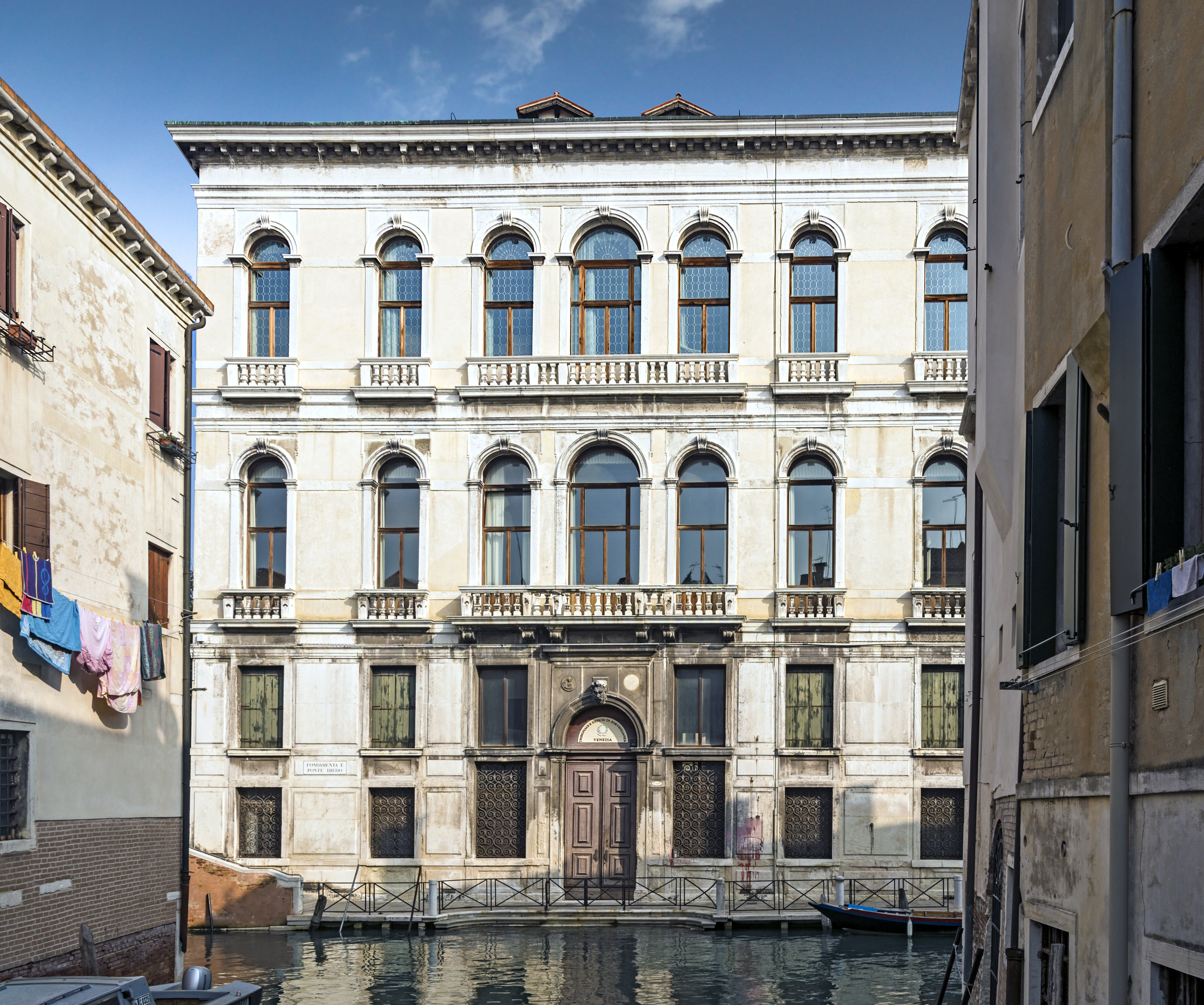
Palazzo Diedo, Cannaregio, Venice

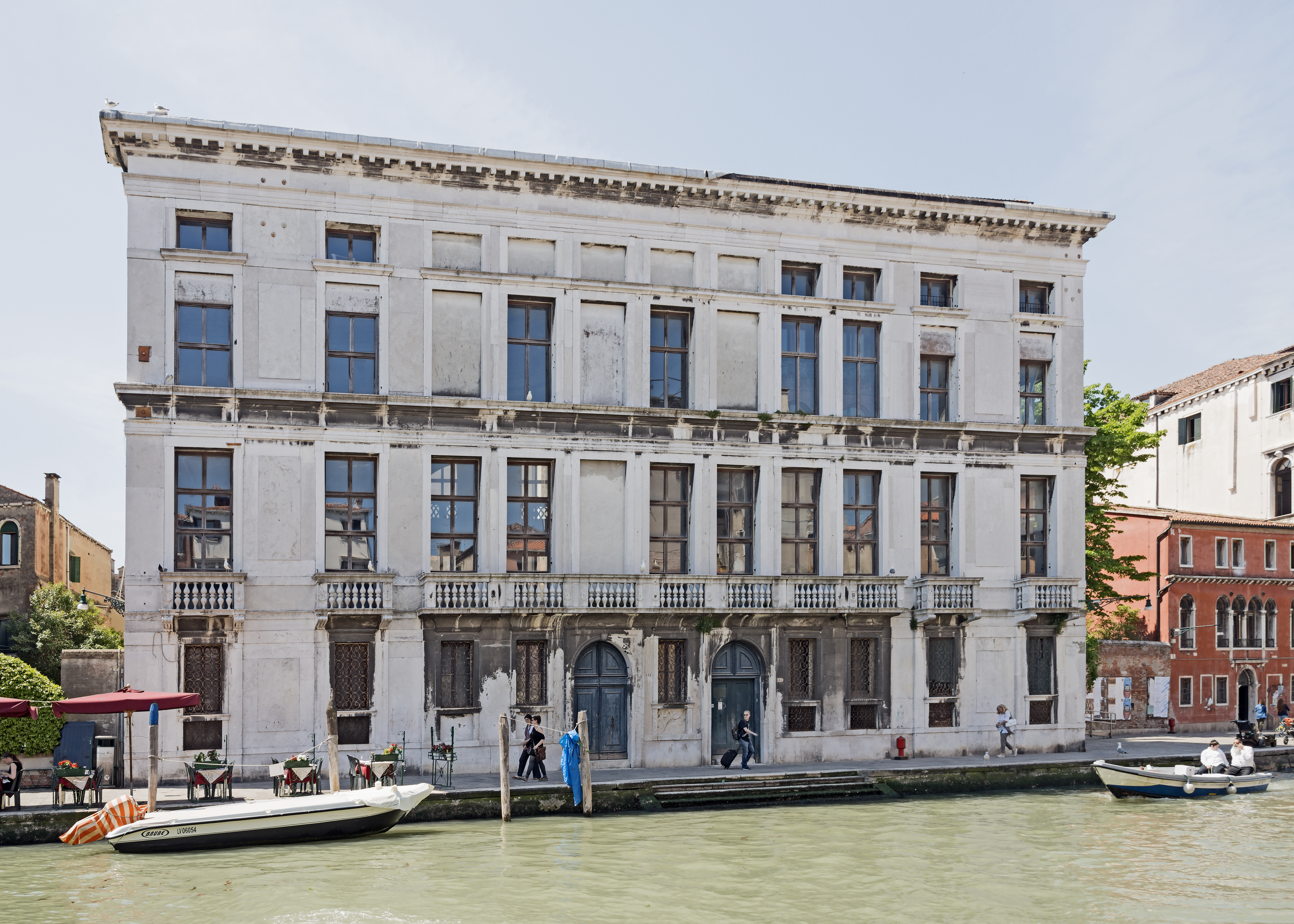
Palazzo Priuli, Venice

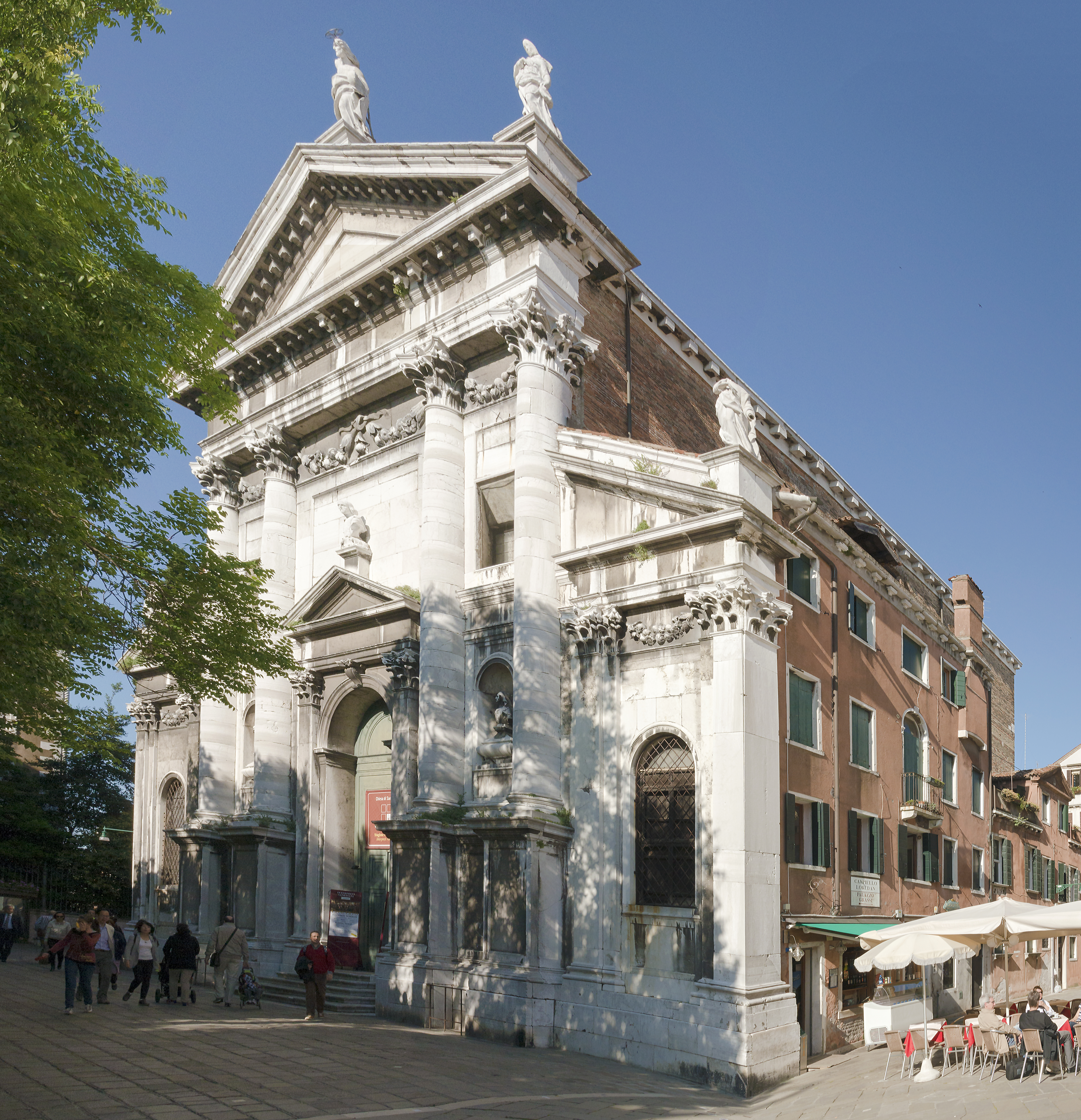
Facade of San Vidal, Venice

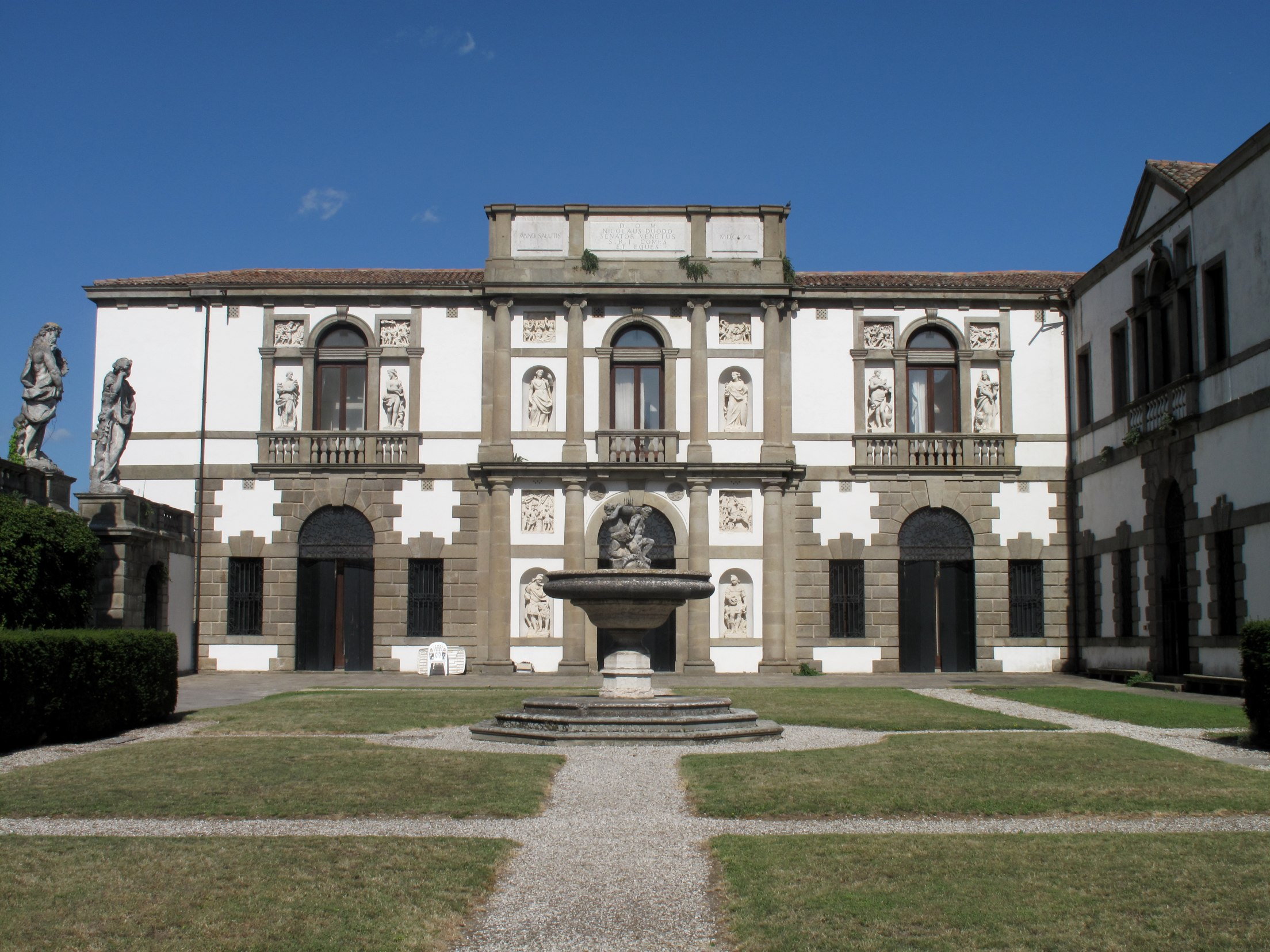
Villa Duodo, Monselice (Scamozzi's original wing on the right)
