= Villa Duodo =

Villa in northern Italy

Coordinates: 45.2409°N 11.7579°E

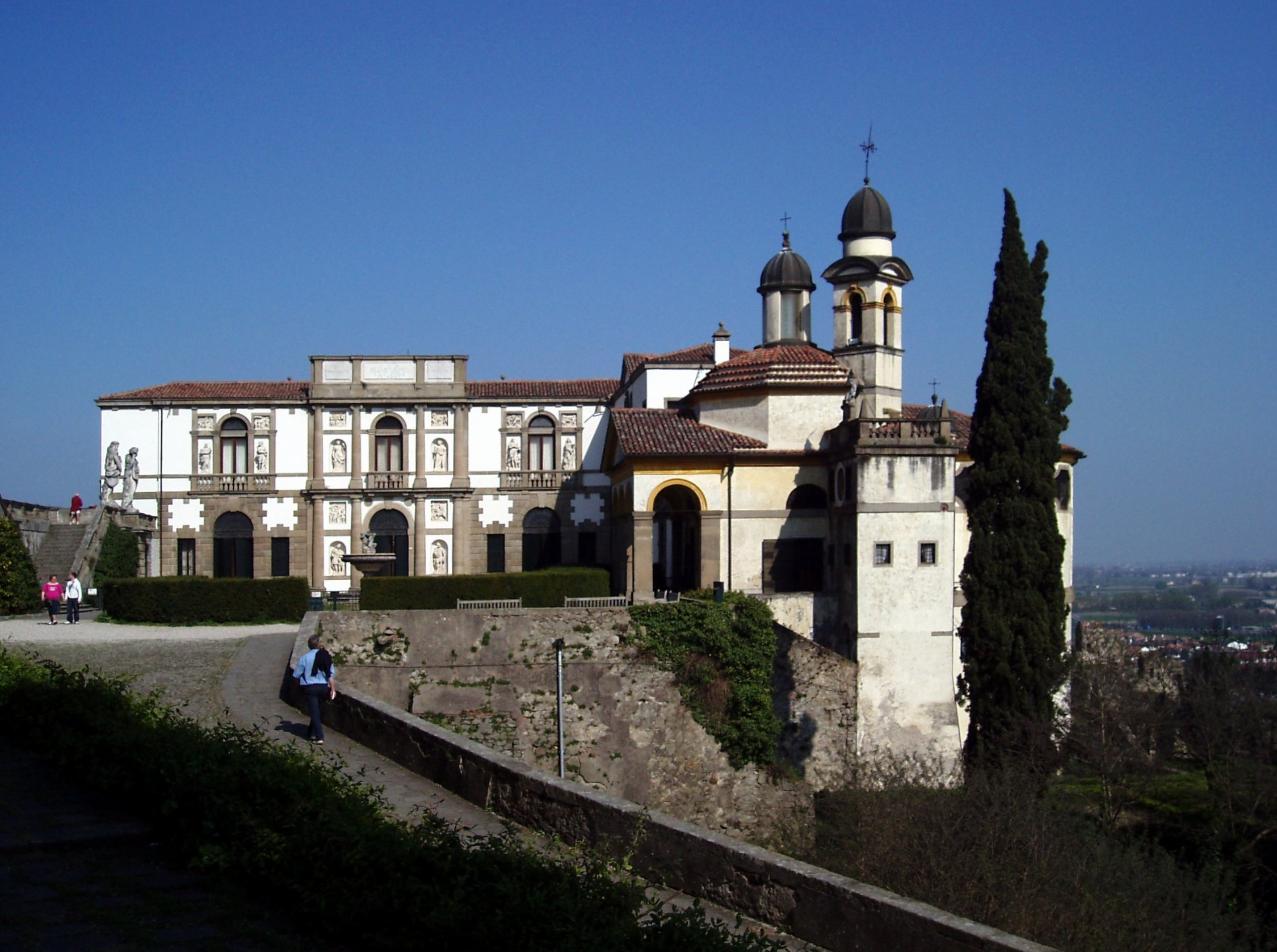
Villa Duodo. The principal facade, to the right are the cupolas of the church of San Giorgio. To the left begins the staircase, leading further up the cliff to the exedra

Villa Duodo, also known as the Villa Valier, is a villa situated at Monselice near Padua in the Veneto, northern Italy. It is attributed to the architect Vincenzo Scamozzi although some later parts are known to have been designed by Andrea Tirali. The villa was built for a Venetian patrician, Francesco Duodo, circa 1592.

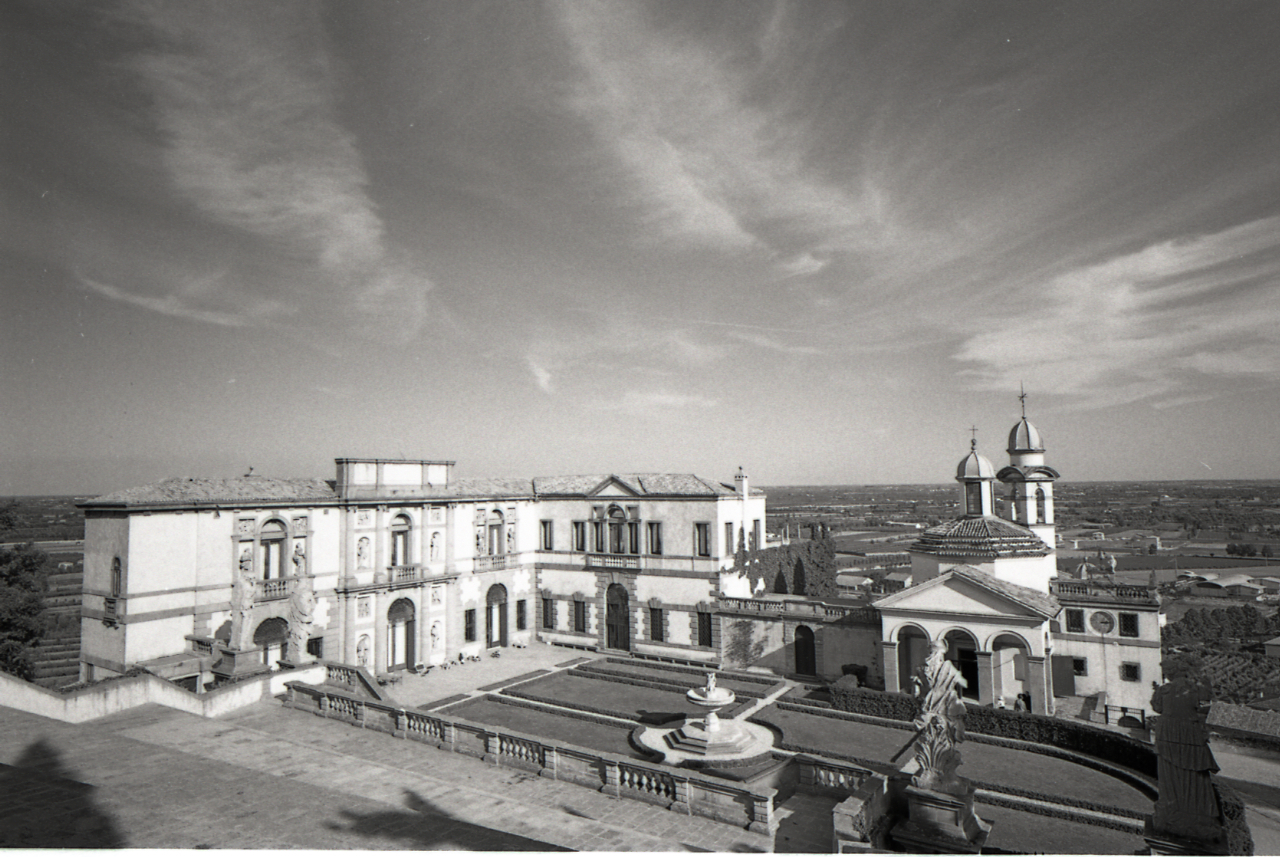
Villa Duodo photographed by Paolo Monti in 1967 (Fondo Paolo Monti, BEIC).

Sited high on the rocca of Monselice, the villa, which shows Palladian influences, is not so much a villa as a religious complex. Two L-shaped blocks form a rectangular courtyard. Attached to the villa is a church dedicated to San Giorgio which is the final and largest church completing a "sacred route" of pilgrimage.

== Architecture ==
Scamozzi, the villa's principal architect, had been a pupil of Palladio and was largely responsible for carrying Palladio's classicising style into the 17th century. His L'idea dell'architettura universale, published in 1615, coupled with Palladio's I quattro libri dell'architettura (1570) were to spread their classically based architecture throughout Europe and the New World. Villa Duodo was one of Scamozzi's works of his intermediate period, designed when he was forty years old and fully competent in the use of perspective and proportion.

The villa, which is built on the site of an ancient castle, is constructed of rendered stone with architectural details and motifs in dressed stone. The principal wing, on two floors, centers a lightly projecting bay that resembles a two-storey triumphal arch flanked by two symmetrical bays, each with open Serlian windows decorated with rusticated stone on the ground floor; above the motif continues, however, here in place of side windows are niches containing statuary.

The complex was expanded by Nicolò Duodo (1657–1742), the grandson of Francesco Duodo. His expansion included the secondary wing designed by Tirali, which was completed in 1740. This wing, at right angles to the principal wing, is of a far simpler design, also on two floors; it has small rectangular windows relieved by a Serlian window at the centre. This wing is connected to the church by a low closed corridor. The chapel has a low dome crowned by a cupola and a campanile also completed by a cupola. The entrance to the church is through a three-arched portico. The pediment of the portico is in reality a gable to the roof of the church.

== Grounds ==
The grounds contain a formal garden in the Renaissance manner and a massive late 17th century exedra, dedicated to St. Francis Xavier, who stayed at the former castle on the site in 1537. The exedra contains at its centre an arched shrine containing a crucifix. The walls are decorated by empty niches while statuary adorns the crowning parapet. The exedra is reached by a monumental terrace staircase.

== Santuario delle Sette Chiese ==
Situated close by, also commissioned by Duodo and designed by Scamozzi are six chapels collectively known as the Santuario delle Sette Chiese ("Sanctuary of the Seven Churches", sometimes "Jubilee Sanctuary of the Seven Churches"), the seventh church being the church of San Giorgio attached to the villa itself. This church holds the remains of the first Christian martyrs.

The chapels became popular places of pilgrimage, when pope Paul V granted pilgrims visiting the sanctuary equal indulgences with those visiting the seven basilicas of Rome, after which the chapels are named. The chapels are positioned along a cobbled path - a votive route - which leads to the esplanade on which the villa and the final church stands. The chapels contain reredos by Palma il Giovane.

The chapels are all similar in design, approximately six metres square, the front having an entrance contained in a segmented arch flanked by pilasters which support a pediment. The sides of the small buildings are pierced by lunette windows. The white rendered walls with decoration in natural dressed stone match the villa and church at the completion of the route. In appearance the churches are not unlike the many, and far more modern, small family mausoleums found in thousands of cemeteries in Italy and France, testimony to the influence of Scamozzi in everyday, and often seemingly unremarkable, architecture.

== Modern history ==
The Villa is today often known as Villa Valier. The gardens and chapels are open to the public but the interior of the villa is private and part of the University of Padova.
