= Villa Molin =

16th-century villa in Padua, Italy

Coordinates: 45.3623°N 11.8397°E

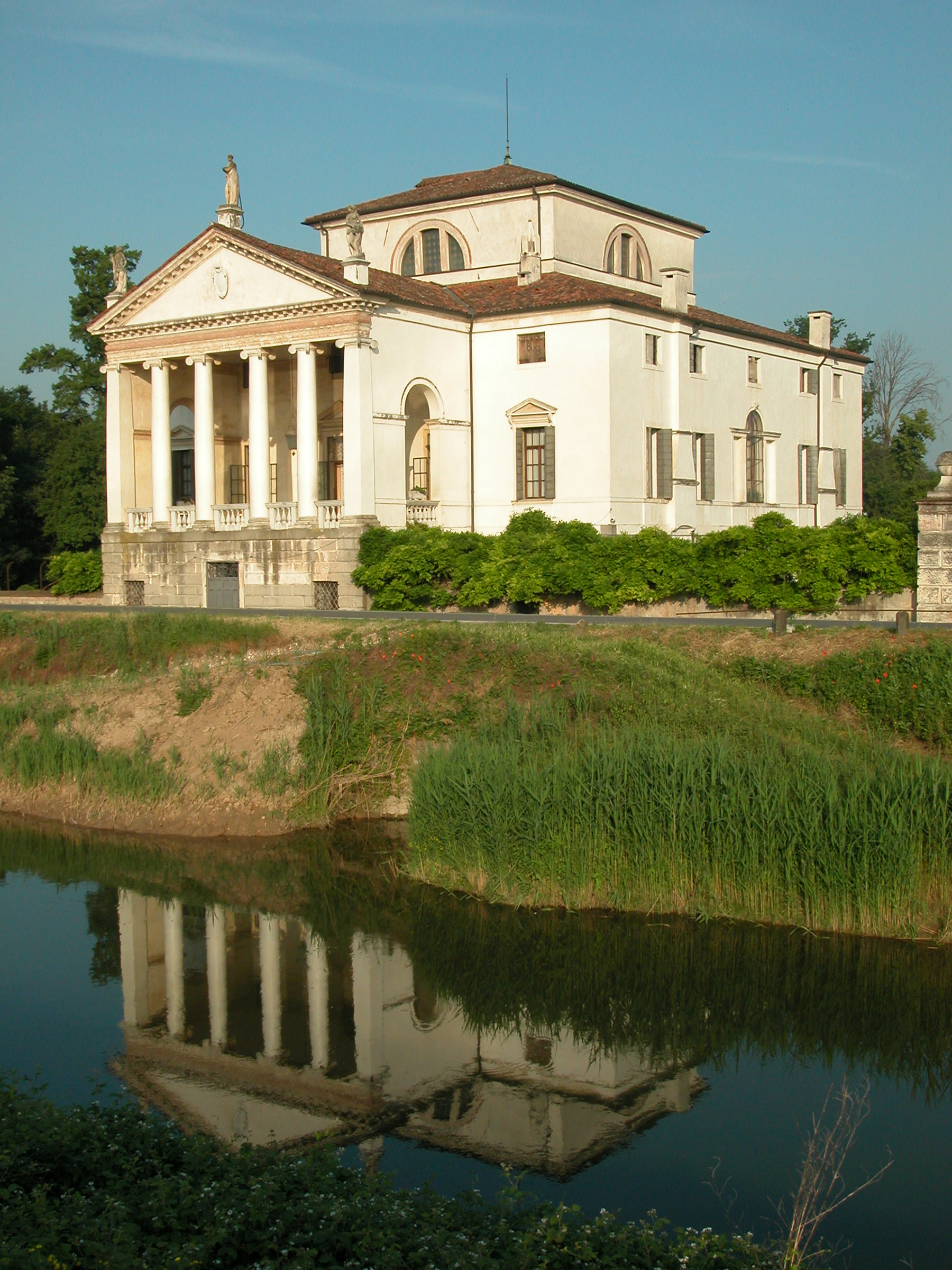
Villa Molin.

Villa Molin is a patrician residence in the neighborhood of Mandria, in Ponte della Cagna, south of Padua, in the Veneto region of northern Italy. It was designed for Nicolò Molin, a Venetian noble, by Vincenzo Scamozzi and completed in 1597. It faces Mandriola, on the opposite side of the Canale di Battaglia. The original agricultural setting of the villa, composed of pasture and orchards, has given way to a residential dormitory community of Padua.

== History ==
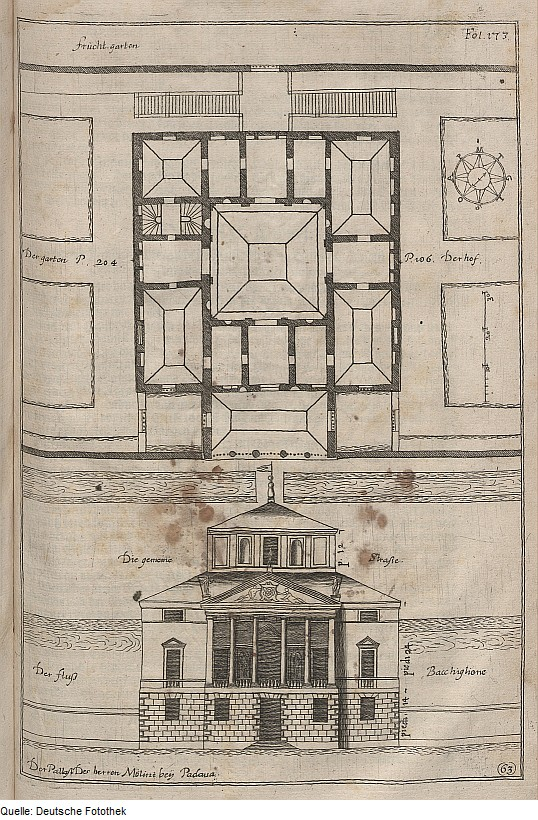
Original image description from the Deutsche FotothekArchitektur & Profanbau & Villa & Grundriss

The plot of land, comprising fifty-two fields lying between Mandria and Abano Terme, was in the possession of Donna Elena, widow of Vincenzo Molin, in 1582. When Nicolò wished to erect there a villa for summer use that would be suited to the family's standing, it was natural to turn to Scamozzi, first among Venetian architects in the terraferma since the death of Palladio in 1580.

The villa was rapidly completed but not long enjoyed by its patron, who died on 9 May 1608. Seven years later his brothers conveyed the villa to Pio Capodilista; it passed to his son Annibale, then to the heirs of Annibale's sister Sigismonda. Alienated from the Conti family in 1768–72, its return was the signal for a thorough-going restoration of its interiors in the hands of Antonio, which gave to the smaller rooms the Rococo stucco decorations of their vaulted ceilings. Passing through heiresses in the nineteenth century, the villa's lands were subdivided and it was eventually reduced to a farmhouse before being rehabilitated by a sympathetic new owner, Michele Dondi dall' Orologio. He provided the villa with its grand exterior staircase to the piano nobile and planted the surrounding parkland with specimen trees, now at full maturity.

During World War I, the villa served as military command headquarters and was the site of preliminary negotiations that led to the signing of the Austrian-Italian Armistice of Villa Giusti on 11 March 1918. In 1955, Villa Molin was restored again by the industrialist Igino Kofler, who replanted the formal Italian walled gardens with boxwood-edged beds.

== Building ==
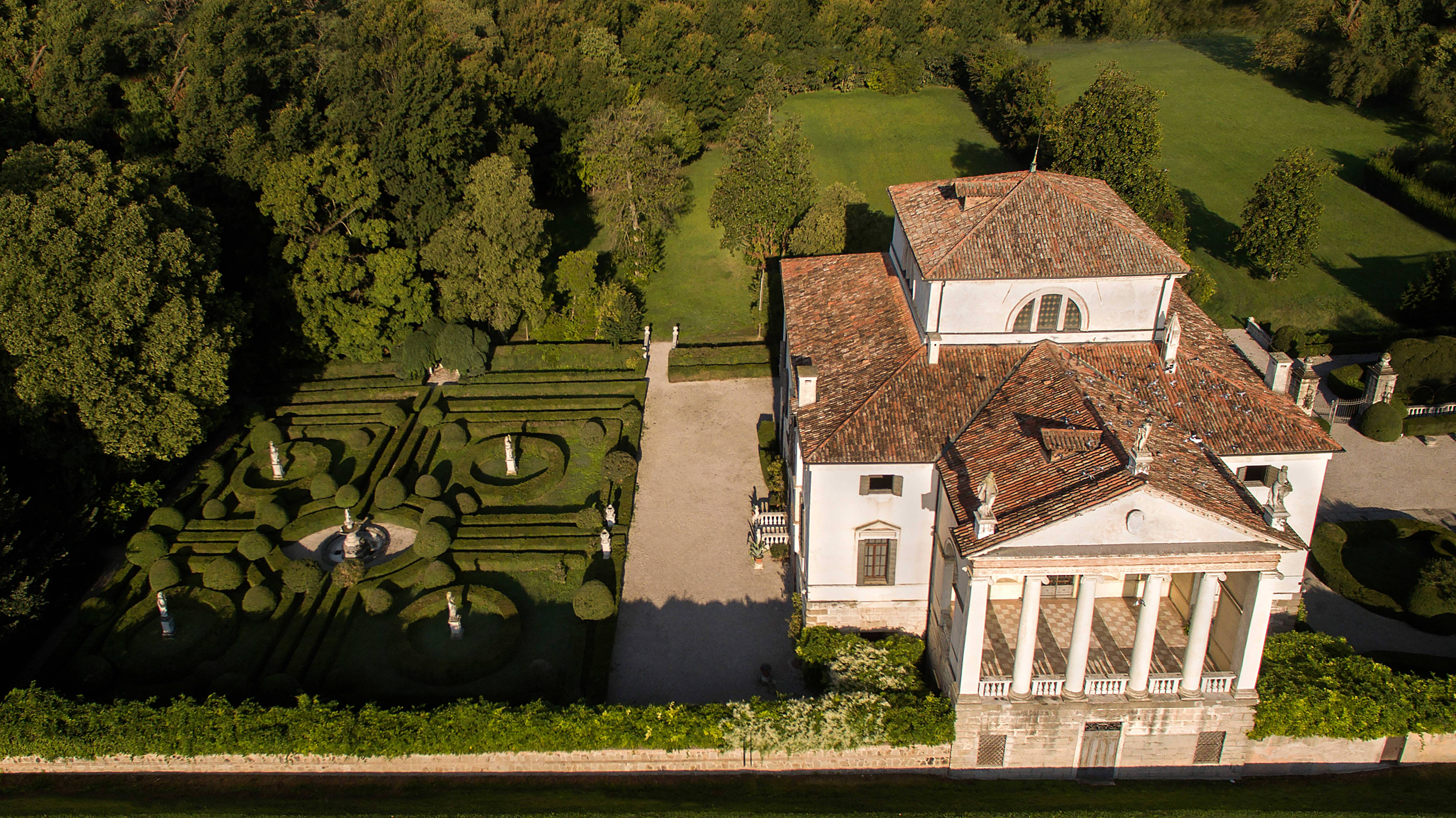

The stucco-faced structure is built on a perfectly square plan, raised on a high rusticated service basement with an Ionic portico, lifted well above the public towpath and facing the Canal. This primary façade of the villa is reminiscent of Andrea Palladio's Villa Rotonda or the Villa Foscari (called "La Malcontenta"). The solid sides of the portico are pierced by grand arch-headed openings to provide additional cross-draft in summer heat.

The villa's other façades are simply treated and harmoniously symmetrical, with central Serlian windows, surmounted by the rectangular lanterna formed by the high cubical central sala that rises through the center of the roof, lit by tripartite lunette windows on each face. The grand central room thus enclosed is frescoed with trompe-l'œil niches, columns, balustrades, and flanked by symmetrically arranged smaller and lower barrel-vaulted rooms that are linked by generous arched openings. Thus, there is an articulated central reception space in the form of a Greek cross. The vestibules give onto more intimate spaces, in a series of cubes, double cubes and "golden mean" rectangles characteristic of cinquecento villa floor plans.
