= San Gaetano, Padua =

Church in Padua, Italy

Coordinates: 45.4083°N 11.8817°E

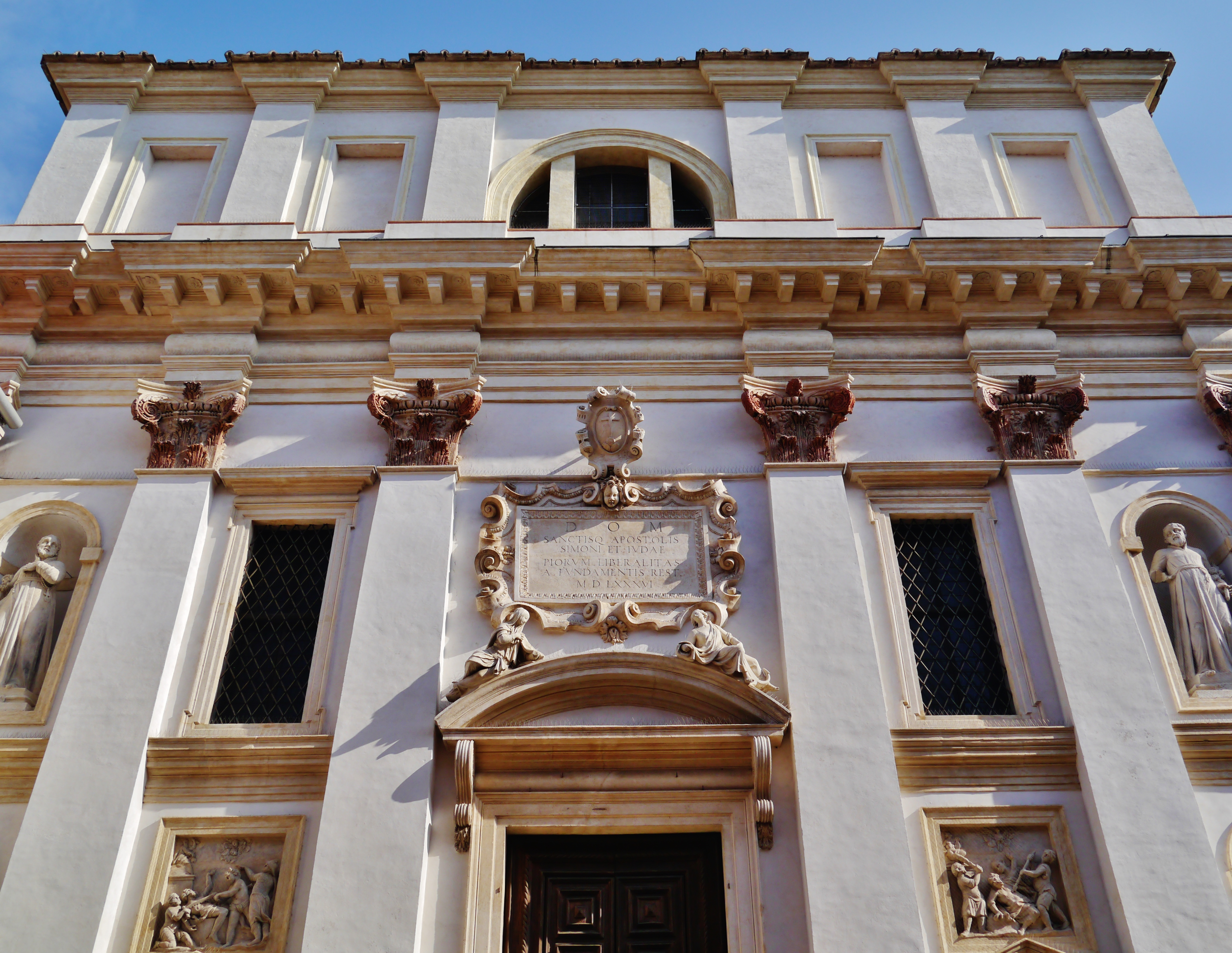
facade of San Gaetano

The Church of San Gaetano is found in the central district of Padua, and its facade was designed by the late Renaissance architect Vincenzo Scamozzi.

The church was constructed from 1574 to 1586 on an octagonal layout, based on a prior chapel at the site, under the direction of the Theatines, an order founded by St Cajetan of Thiene and favored by cardinal Pietro Carafa, who became Pope Paul IV. It was built on the site of an old church dedicated to San Francesco Piccolo.

== Decoration- ==
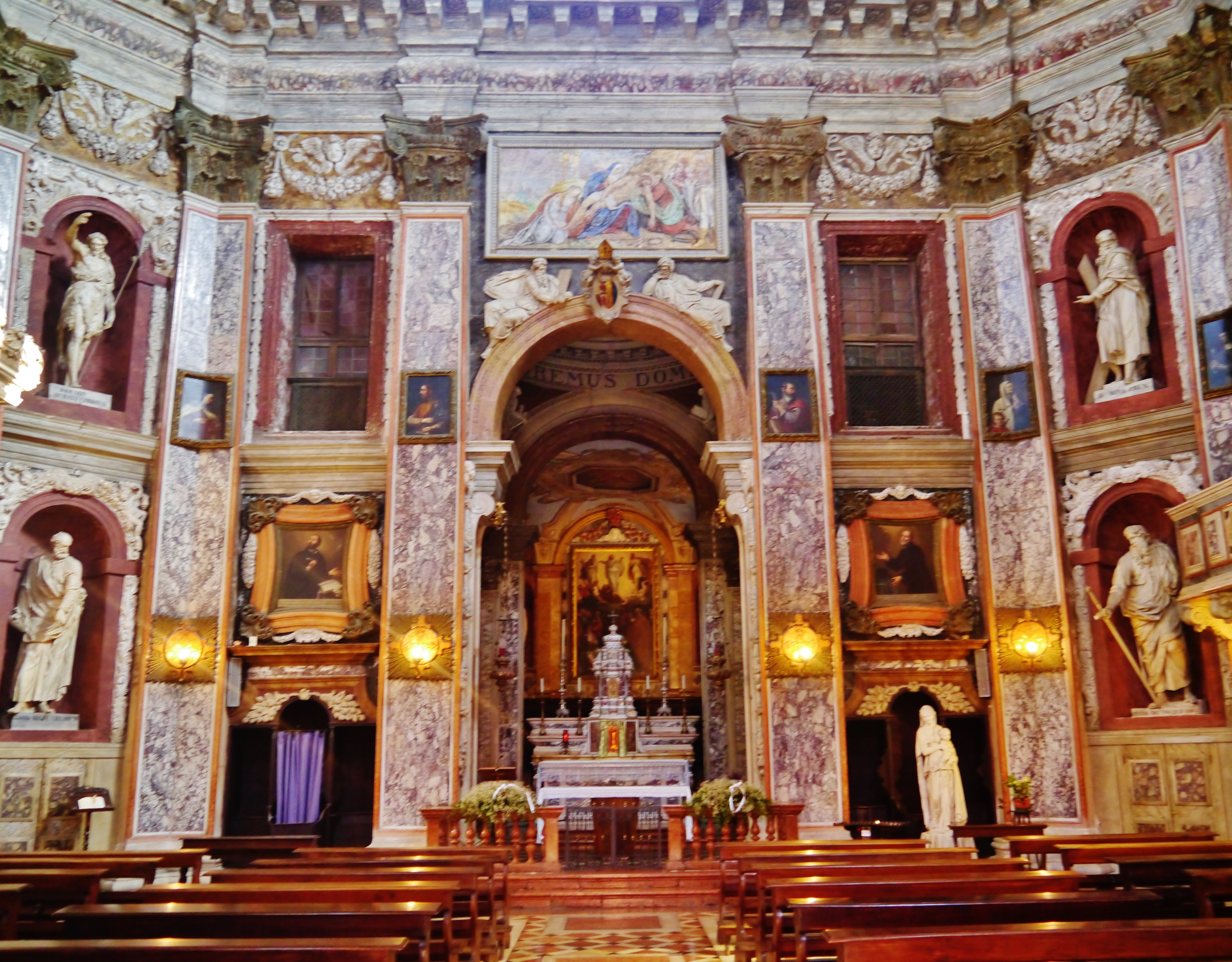
View towards main altar.

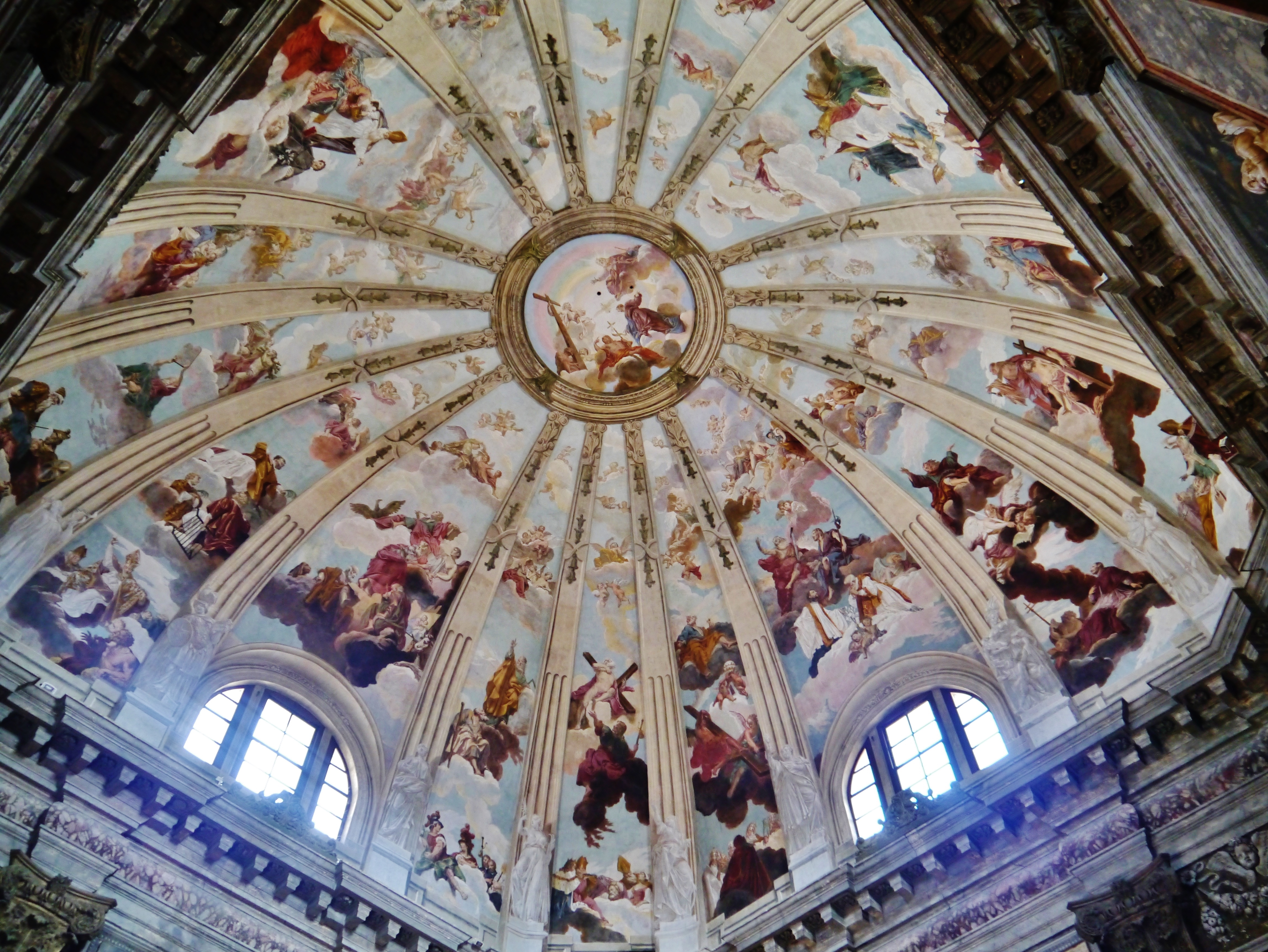
Dome frescoes by Vernansal depicting Paradise

The internal area is octagonal, and richly decorated by polychrome marble. The ceiling fresco depicting paradise was completed by Guido Luigi Vernansal. The interior contains a Madonna and Child by Andrea Briosco, originally from the church of the Umiliati. A late-16th-century altarpieces is a Compianto su Cristo by Dario Varotari the Elder. Along the nave, 17th-century canvases depict Saints with ties to Padua: including Prosdocimus, Antony, Giustina, and Daneiele; or the Theatine order: Cajetan and Andrea Avellino.

In the chapel of St Cajetan are two canvases by Pietro Damini: a Transfiguration with Theatine Saints and a San Carlo Borromeo heals an ill girl. The canvas of San Carlo before Clement VIII (1622) was painted by Giovanni Battista Bissoni. In the Cappella della Madonna della Purità, are canvases by Palma il Giovane and Alessandro Maganza. In the Cappella del Santo Sepolcro or del Crocifisso, is a depiction of the Flagellation of Christ by Vernansal and a 17th-century wooden crucifix by Agostino Tannini. In the sacristy on the west side of the church are paintings depicting the martyrdoms of St Simone (by blinding) and St Judas Thaddeus (by beating) by Pietro Damini. The bas-relief marble Pietà in the sacristy is by Bartolomeo Bellano and the wooden altarpiece depicting the Prayer in the Garden is by Michele Fabris.

The adjacent 17th century monastery has been converted into a modern museum and cultural center.

== Sources ==
- Padua Tourism Agency
