= Vincenzo Scamozzi =

Italian architect (1548–1616)

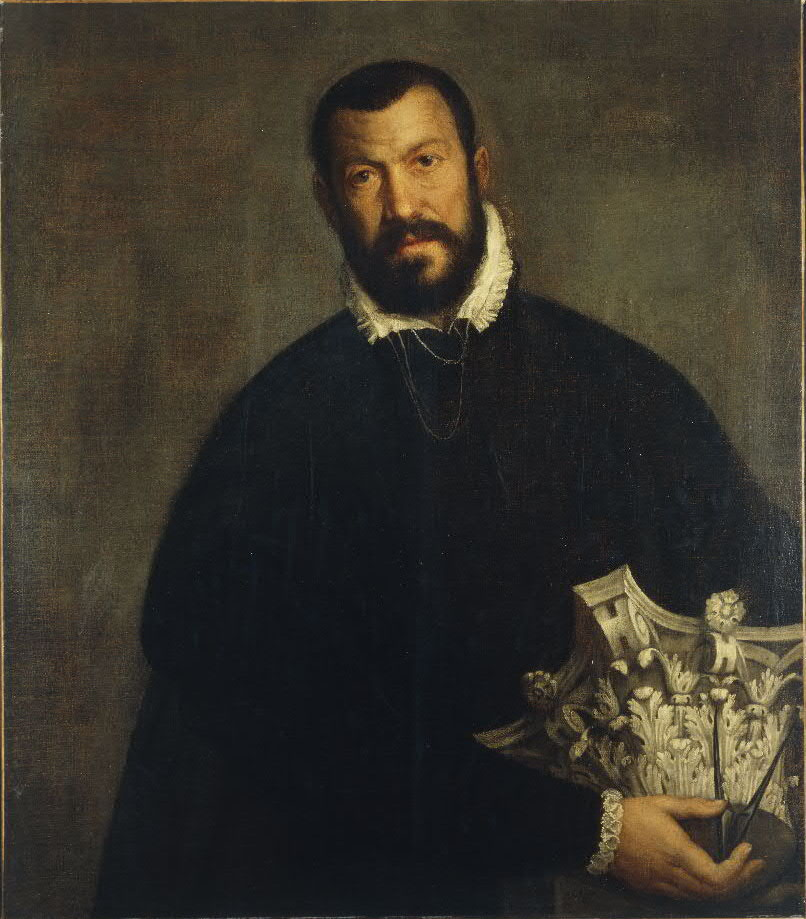
- Portrait of Vincenzo Scamozzi by Paolo Veronese
- Born: 2 September 1548; Vicenza, Italy
- Died: 7 August 1616 (aged 67); Venice, Italy
- Occupation: Architect
- Buildings: Palazzo Thiene Bonin Longare, Rocca Pisana, Villa Capra "La Rotonda", Villa Duodo, Palazzo Loredan Vendramin Calergi

Vincenzo Scamozzi (2 September 1548 – 7 August 1616) was an Italian architect and a writer on architecture, active mainly in Vicenza and Republic of Venice area in the second half of the 16th century. He was perhaps the most important figure there between Andrea Palladio, whose unfinished projects he inherited at Palladio's death in 1580, and Baldassarre Longhena, Scamozzi's only pupil.

The great public project of Palladio's that Scamozzi inherited early in the process of construction was the Teatro Olimpico at Vicenza, which Palladio had designed in the last months of his life.

== Biography ==
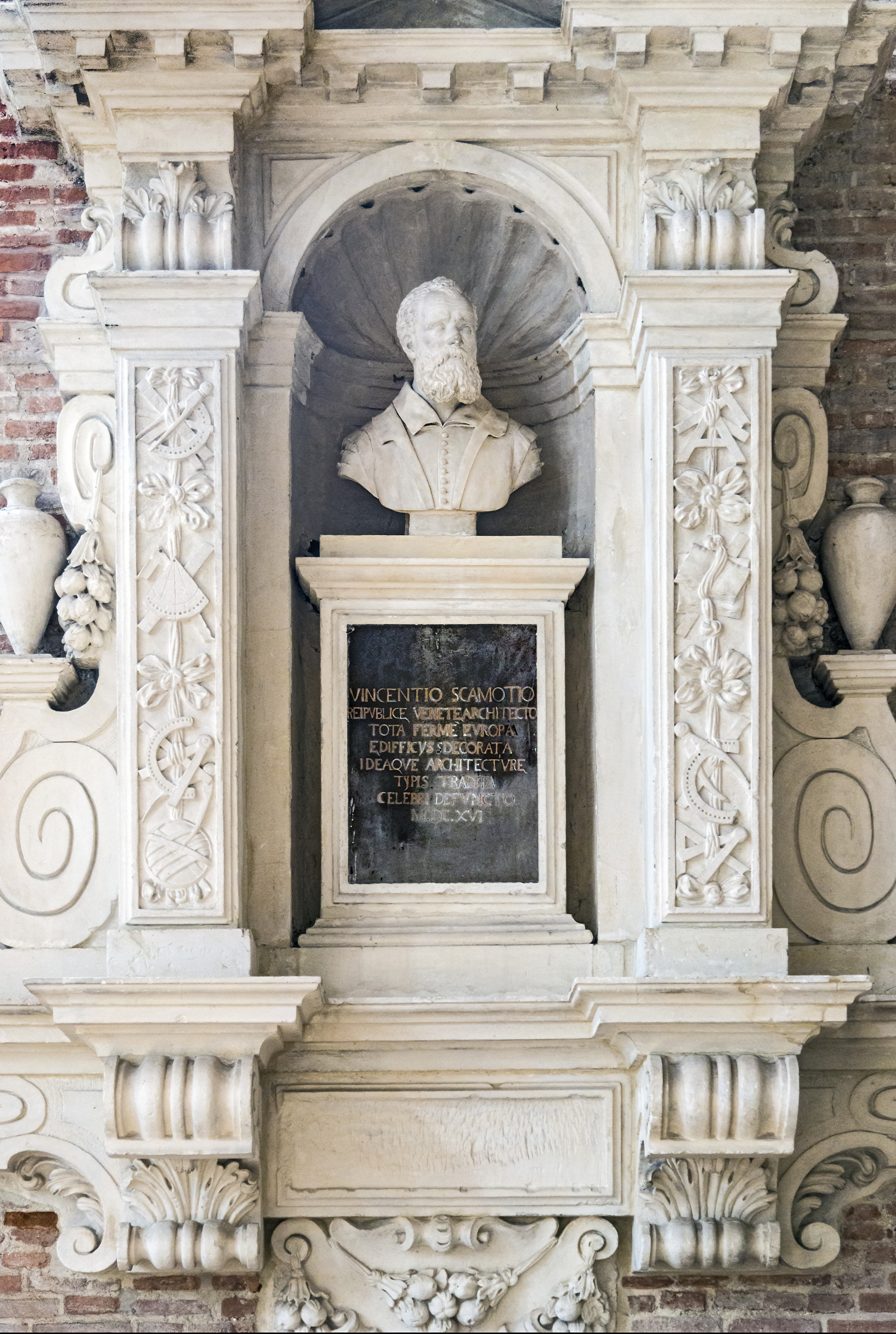
Monument to Vincenzo Scamozzi. Church of San Lorenzo, Vicenza

Scamozzi was born in Vicenza. His father was the surveyor and building contractor Gian Domenico Scamozzi; he was Scamozzi's first teacher, imbuing him with the principles of Sebastiano Serlio, laid out in Serlio's book. Vincenzo visited Rome in 1579–1580, and then moved to Venice in 1581. In 1599 to 1600, he visited the German Empire and France and left a sketchbook record of his impressions of French architecture, which first saw the light of day in 1959. Scamozzi is famous for having inherited several unfinished projects from Andrea Palladio at the time of Palladio's death in 1580 and for bringing them to their completed form.

== The Idea of a Universal Architecture ==
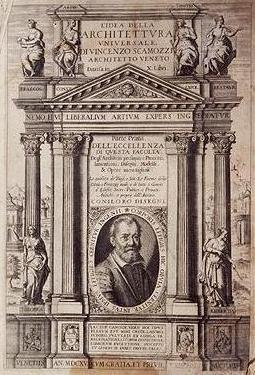
L'idea della Architettura universale di Vincenzo Scamozzi architetto veneto, 1615

Scamozzi's influence spread far beyond his Italian commissions through his two-volume treatise, L'idea dell'architettura universale ("The Idea of a Universal Architecture"), which is one of the last works of the Renaissance dealing with the theory of architecture. It was originally published with woodcut illustrations at Venice in 1615. Scamozzi depended for sections of his treatment of Vitruvius on Daniele Barbaro's commentary, published in 1556 with illustrations by Palladio; he also discussed issues of building practice. At that time, such treatises were becoming a vehicle for self-promotion. Scamozzi was aware of the potential value of publicity distributed through the established channels of the book trade and he included many of his own plans and elevations, as built, as they should have been built, and as idealized projects.

His first book entitled Discorsi sopra l'antichita di Roma (Venice: Ziletti, 1583) had been quickly cobbled together with some illustrated commentary on the ruins of Rome, assembled in "the space of a few of days." According to his preface to the volumes, the images were stock productions that already existed. Over half were copied from a volume published by Hieronymus Cock in Antwerp in 1551.

His major book came out one year before his death and was too late to influence his own success. Scamozzi's practice is sometimes spoken of as being a source of the neo-Palladian architecture as it was introduced by Inigo Jones, another follower of Andrea Palladio's own example. Rudolf Wittkower referred to him as among "the intellectual father(s) of neo-classicism".

== Piazza San Marco ==
Scamozzi moved to Venice in 1581, where he had been invited to design the Procuratie Nuove on the Piazza San Marco itself. The Procuratie Nuove was built as a row of official housing for the Procuratorate of San Marco, presented as a unified palace front that continues the end facade of the Sansovino Library, with its arcaded ground floor and arch-headed windows of the first floor, but adding an upper floor to provide the necessary accommodation. In accomplishing this design, Scamozzi adapted a rejected project of Palladio's for a re-faced Doge's Palace, with colonnettes that flank the windows to support alternating triangular and arched pediments, upon which Scamozzi added reclining figures, to balance the richness of the Sansovinian decoration of the two lower floors. Eleven bays of this project were completed, and later were extended by Baldassare Longhena (Scamozzi's only pupil) to fill the whole south flank of the piazza.

== Chronology of works ==
All but one of the following works are in the territory of the Republic of Venice:

- 1568–1575: Villa of Girolamo Ferramosca, Barbano di Grisignano di Zocco (Province of Vicenza) (with Gian Domenico Scamozzi)
- 1569: Palazzo Godi, Vicenza (project, altered during later execution)
- 1572–1593: Palazzo Thiene Bonin Longare, Vicenza (reworked on a previous project by Palladio)
- 1574–1615: Villa of Leonardo Verlato, Villaverla (Vicenza)
- 1575: Palazzo Caldogno, Vicenza
- 1575–1578: Rocca Pisana (Vettor Pisani Villa), Lonigo (Vicenza)
- 1576–1579: Trissino-Trento (Pierfranceso Trissino Palace), Vicenza (with Gian Domenico Scamozzi)
- 1580: Villa of Francesco Priuli, Treville di Castelfranco Veneto (Province of Treviso) (north wing)
- 1580–1584: Villa Nani Mocenigo, Canda (Province of Rovigo)
- 1580–1592: Villa Capra "La Rotonda", near Vicenza (completed construction of Andrea Palladio's structure for Mario Capra, and added stables, not completed until 1620)
- 1581–1586: Church of San Gaetano Thiene, Padua
- 1581–1599: Procuratie Nuove, Piazza San Marco, Venice (continued with a different interior design by Francesco Smeraldi and completed in 1663 by Longhena)
- 1582: Palazzo Cividale, Vicenza [attributed]
- 1582–1591: Library of San Marco, Venice (completion of Jacopo Sansovino's design)
- 1584–1585: Teatro Olimpico, Vicenza (remodeling of structure designed by Andrea Palladio, wooden scene)
- 1587–1596: Library of San Marco, Venice (the vestibule, Antisala)
- 1588: Villa Cornaro, Poisolo, Treville di Castelfranco Veneto (Treviso) (reconstruction)
- 1588–1590: Teatro all'antica for Duke Vespasiano I Gonzaga, Sabbioneta (Province of Mantova)
- 1590: Villa Contarini for Girolamo Contarini, Loreggia (Padua) (revised in construction)
- 1590–1595: Church of San Nicolò da Tolentino, Venice
- 1591–1593: Statuary of Venice Republic (museum), Venice
- 1591–1593: Design of Palmanova, an 'ideal city' built over the next thirty years 100km northeast of Venice
- 1591–1594: Monastery and Church of San Gaetano Thiene, Padua
- 1591–1595: Villa Cornaro for Girolamo Cornaro, Piombino Dese (Province of Padua) (completion) [attributed]
- 1591–1597: Villa Duodo and Chapel of San Giorgio, Monselice (Padua)
- 1592–1616: Palace of Galeazzo Trissino al Corso, Vicenza
- 1594–1600: Villa of Valerio Bardellini, Monfumo
- 1596: Villa Ferretti for Girolamo Ferretti on the Riviera del Brenta, Sambruson del Dolo (Venice). The A. Everett Austin House in Hartford, Connecticut, U.S. is an homage to the Villa Ferreti.
- 1596–1597: Villa Cornaro for Girolamo Cornaro, Piombino Dese (Padua) (added stable wing)
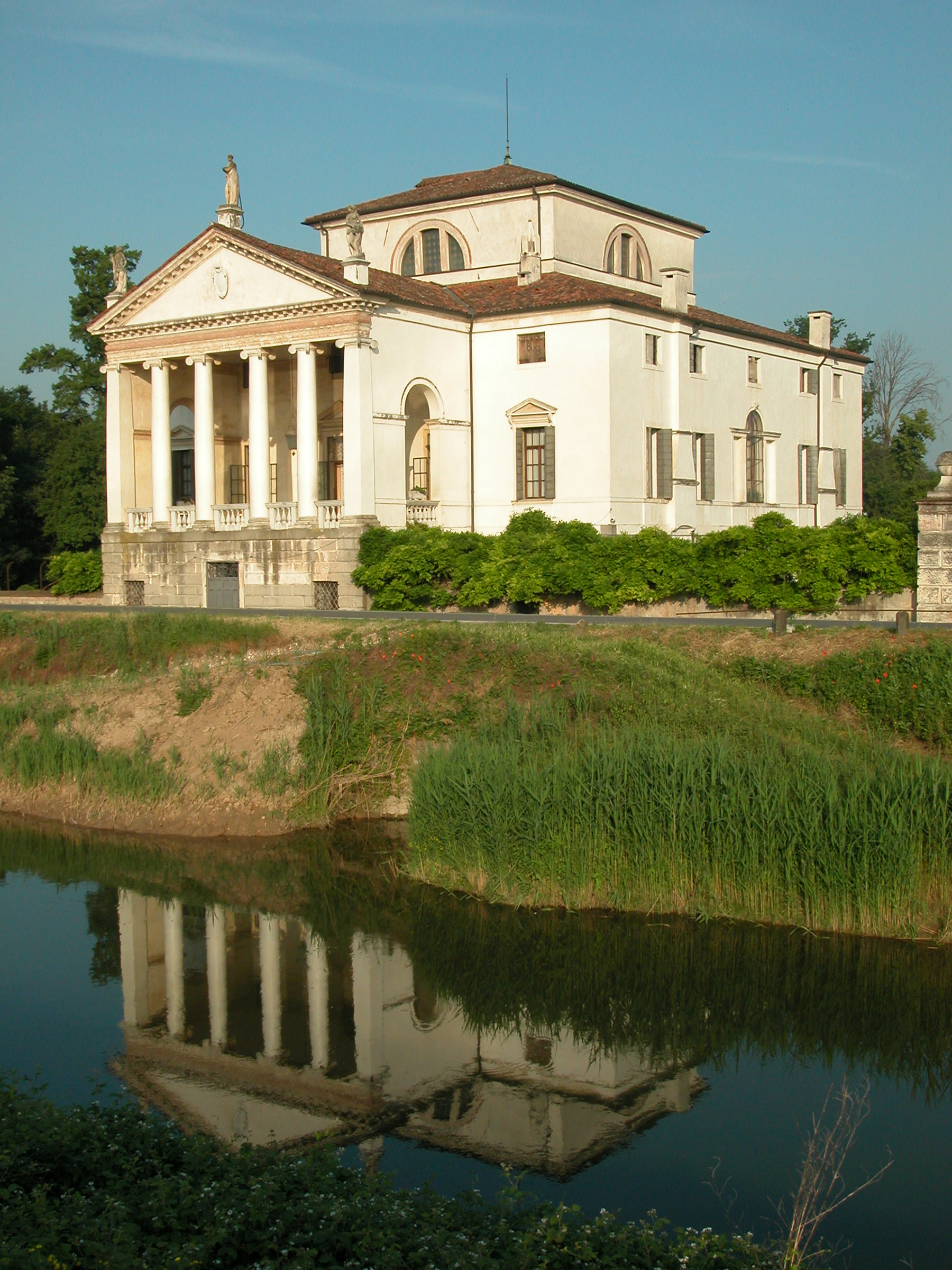
  Villa Molin at Mandria, south of Padua.
- 1597: Villa Molin, Mandria, (Padua)
- 1597: Villa Priuli, Carrara (Padua)
- 1597–1598: Villa Godi, Sarmego di Grumolo delle Abbadesse (Vicenza)
- 1601: Palazzo del Bò, Padua (university facade)
- 1601–1606: San Giacomo di Rialto, Venice (altar of Scuola degli Orefici; with Girolamo Campagna)
- 1601–1636: San Lazzaro dei Mendicanti Church and Hospital, Venice
- 1604–1612: Cathedral of Sts. Rupert and Virgil, Salzburg, Austria (project; completed in 1614–28 by Santino Solari)
- 1605: Santi Giovanni e Paolo, Venice (sacristy door; with Alessandro Vittoria)
- 1605–1616: Villa Duodo, Monselice (Padua) (six chapels for Via Romana)
- 1607–1611: San Giorgio Maggiore (church), Venice (completion of Palladio's facade)
- 1607–1616: Villa Cornaro al Paradiso, Venice (twin pavilions)
- 1609: Domenico Trevisan Villa, San Donà di Piave
- 1609–1616: Palazzo Contarini degli Scrigni, Santrovaso on the Canal Grande, Venice
- 1610: Villa Contarini degli Scrigni detta Vigna Contarena (Este)
- 1614: Palazzo Loredan Vendramin Calergi, Venice (east wing; demolished in 1659 and rebuilt in 1660)

== General and cited references ==
- Bibliography of the Idea at Architectura - Les livres d'Architecture
- Guido Beltramini, "The Fortunes and Misfortunes of Scamozzi’s Idea della Architettura Universale in Palladian Territory" in Annali di architettura, no. 18–19, 2007
- Howard Burns, "Inigo Jones and Vincenzo Scamozzi" in Annali di architettura, no. 18–19, 2007
- Charles Davis, "Architecture and Light: Vincenzo Scamozzi’s Statuary Installation in the Chiesetta of the Palazzo Ducale in Venice" in Annali di architettura no. 14, Vicenza 2002
- Branko Mitrović and Vittoria Senes, "Vincenzo Scamozzi’s Annotations to Daniele Barbaro’s Commentary on Vitruvius’ De Architectura" in Annali di architettura no. 14, Vicenza 2002
- Konrad Ottenheym, "A Bird’s-Eye View of the Dissemination of Scamozzi’s Treatise in Northern Europe" in Annali di architettura, no. 18–19, 2007
- Scamozzi, Vincenzo (1615). Idea dell'architettura universale (in Italian). Vol. 1. Venezia: Giorgio Valentini.
- Scamozzi, Vincenzo (1615). Idea dell'architettura universale (in Italian). Vol. 2. Venezia: Giorgio Valentini.
- Scamozzi, Vincenzo. Uvres d'architecture de Vincent Scamozzi, architecte de la République de Venise, 1764
- Giles Worsley, "Scamozzi’s Influence on English Seventeenth-Century Architecture" in Annali di architettura, no. 18–19, 2007
