= Astronomical clock =

Clock displaying astronomical information

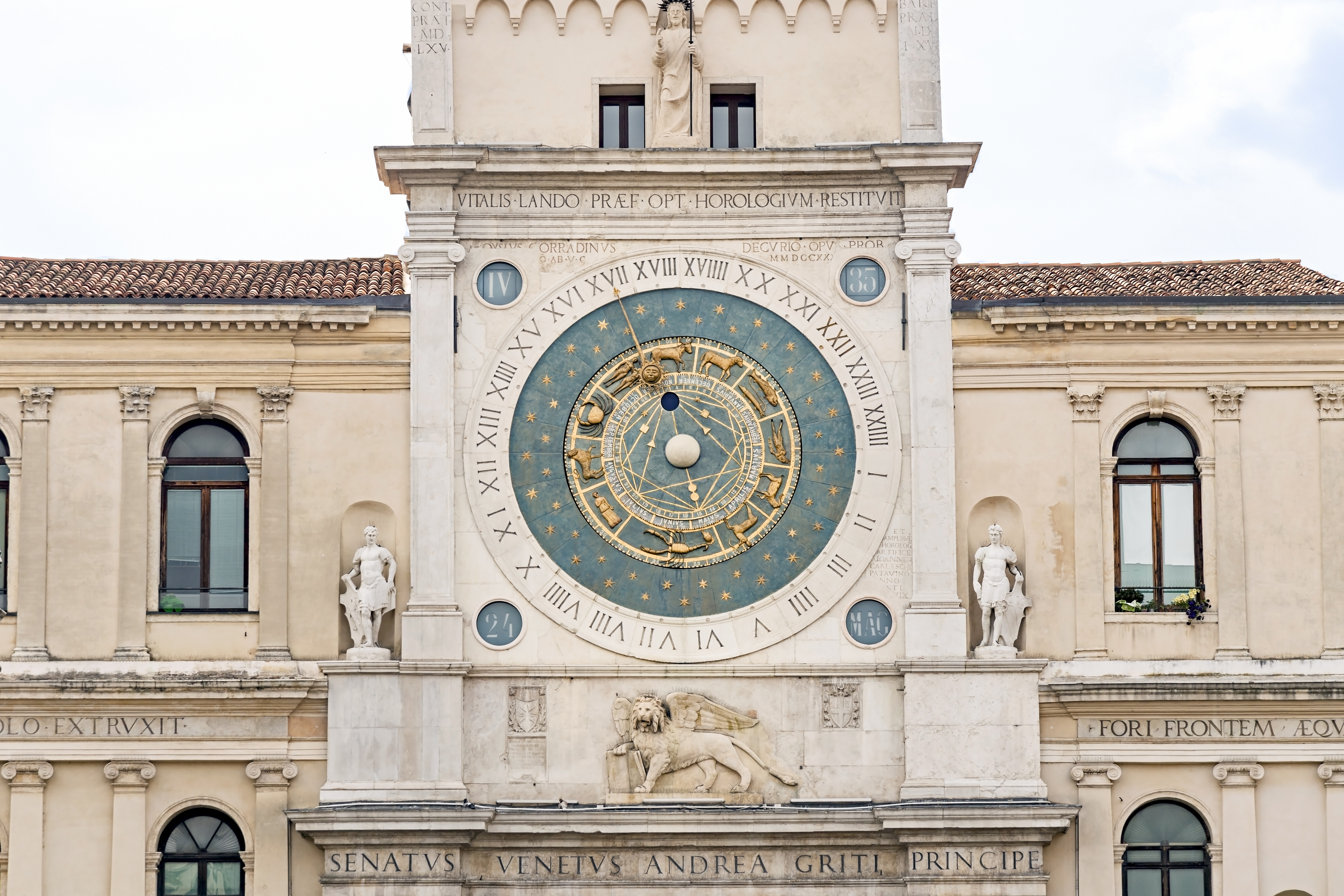
Astronomical clock by Novello Dondi Padova

An astronomical clock, horologium, or orloj is a clock with special mechanisms and dials to display astronomical information, such as the relative positions of the Sun, Moon, zodiacal constellations, and major planets.

== Definition ==
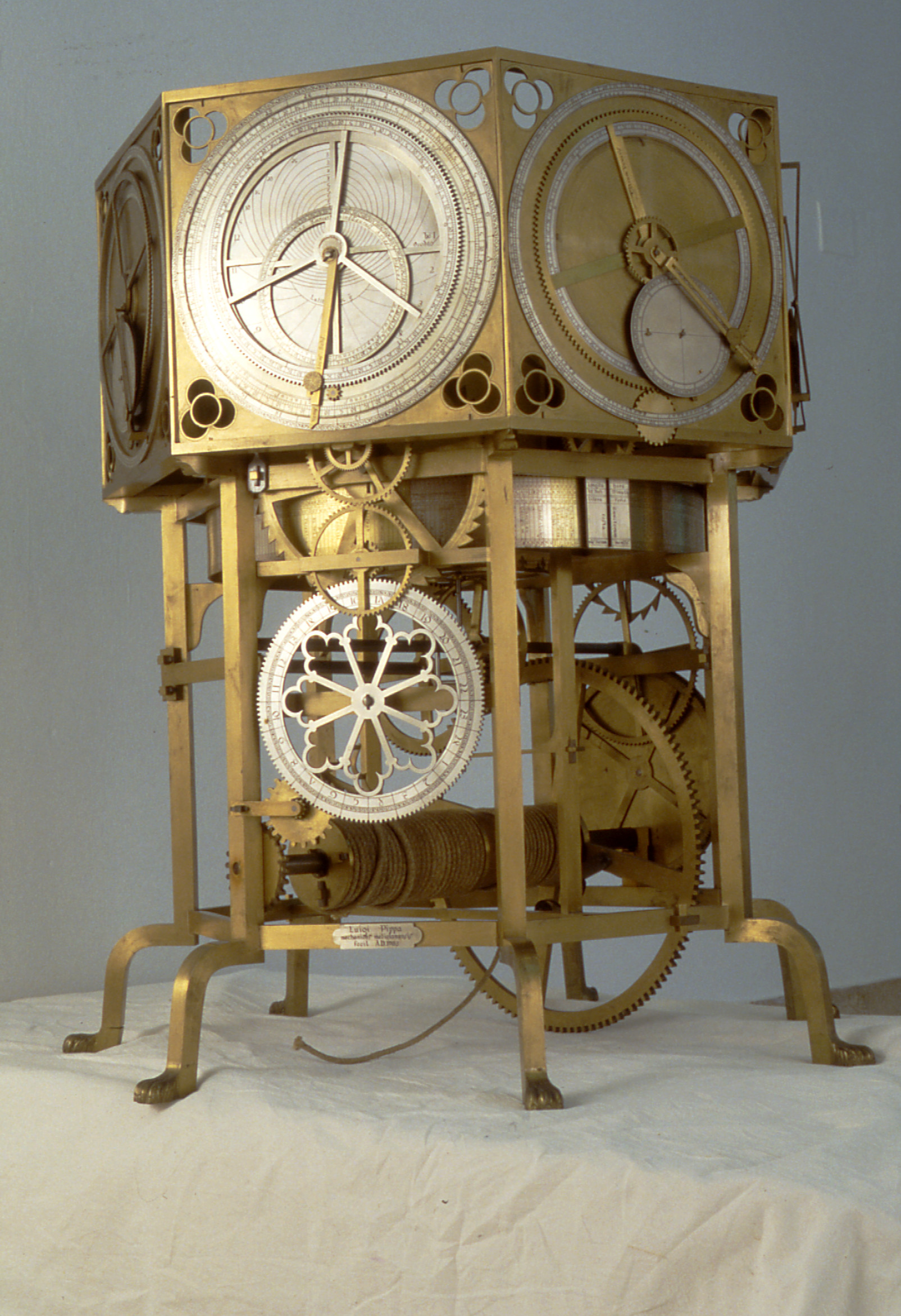
The astrarium made by the Italian astronomer and physician Giovanni Dondi dell'Orologio showed the hour, the yearly calendar, and the movement of the planets, Sun and Moon. Above is a modern reconstruction in the Museo Nazionale Scienza e Tecnologia Leonardo da Vinci in Milan, Italy; it is about three feet high.

The term is loosely used to refer to any clock that shows, in addition to the time of day, astronomical information. This could include the location of the Sun and Moon in the sky, the age and Lunar phases, the position of the Sun on the ecliptic and the current zodiac sign, the sidereal time, and other astronomical data such as the Moon's nodes, which can be used to indicate eclipses, or a rotating star map. The term should not be confused with an astronomical regulator, a high-precision but otherwise ordinary pendulum clock used in observatories.

Astronomical clocks usually represent the Solar System using the geocentric model. The center of the dial is often marked with a disc or sphere representing the Earth, located at the center of the Solar System. The Sun is often represented by a golden sphere (as it initially appeared in the Antikythera mechanism, back in the 2nd century BC), shown rotating around the Earth once a day around a 24-hour analog dial. This view accorded both with the daily experience and with the philosophical world view of pre-Copernican Europe.

== History ==
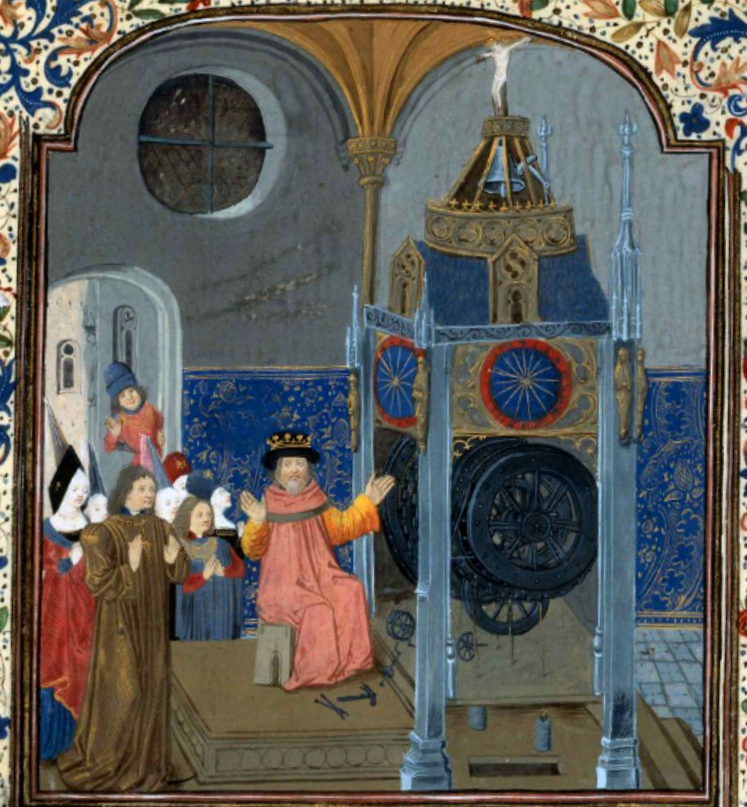
The Flemish courtier and bibliophile Louis de Gruuthuse in front of an astronomical clock. Henri Suso, Horloge de Sapience, 1470-1480

The Antikythera mechanism is the oldest known analog computer and a precursor to astronomical clocks. A complex arrangement of multiple gears and gear trains could determine the positions of the sun, moon and planets, predict eclipses and other astronomical phenomena, and track the dates of Olympic Games. Research in 2011 and 2012 led an expert group of researchers to posit that European astronomical clocks are descended from the technology of the Antikythera mechanism.

In the 11th century, the Song dynasty Chinese horologist, mechanical engineer, and astronomer Su Song created a water-driven astronomical clock for his clock-tower of Kaifeng City. Su Song is noted for having incorporated an escapement mechanism and the earliest known endless power-transmitting chain drive for his clock-tower and armillary sphere to function. Contemporary Muslim astronomers and engineers also constructed a variety of highly accurate astronomical clocks for use in their observatories, such as the astrolabic clock by Ibn al-Shatir in the early 14th century.

The early development of mechanical clocks in Europe is not fully understood, but there is general agreement that by 1300–1330 there existed mechanical clocks (powered by weights rather than by water and using an escapement) which were intended for two main purposes: for signalling and notification (e.g. the timing of services and public events), and for modelling the solar system. The latter is an inevitable development because the astrolabe was used both by astronomers and astrologers, and it was natural to apply a clockwork drive to the rotating plate to produce a working model of the solar system. American historian Lynn White Jr. of Princeton University wrote:

Most of the first clocks were not so many chronometers as exhibitions of the pattern of the cosmos … Clearly, the origins of the mechanical clock lie in a complex realm of monumental planetaria, equatoria, and astrolabes.

The astronomical clocks developed by the English mathematician and cleric Richard of Wallingford in St Albans during the 1330s, and by medieval Italian physician and astronomer Giovanni Dondi dell'Orologio in Padua between 1348 and 1364 are masterpieces of their type. They no longer exist, but detailed descriptions of their design and construction survive, and modern reproductions have been made. Wallingford's clock may have shown the sun, moon (age, phase, and node), stars and planets, and had, in addition, a wheel of fortune and an indicator of the state of the tide at London Bridge. De Dondi's clock was a seven-faced construction with 107 moving parts, showing the positions of the sun, moon, and five planets, as well as religious feast days.

Both these clocks, and others like them, were probably less accurate than their designers intended. Although the gear ratios may have been carefully calculated, their manufacture was somewhat beyond the mechanical abilities of the time, and they never worked reliably. Furthermore, in contrast to the intricate advanced wheelwork, the timekeeping mechanism in nearly all these clocks until the 16th century was the simple verge and foliot escapement, which had errors of at least half an hour a day.

Astronomical clocks were built as demonstration or exhibition pieces, intended to impress as well as to educate or inform. The challenge of building these masterpieces meant that clockmakers would continue to produce them, to demonstrate their technical skill and their patrons' wealth. The philosophical message of an ordered, heavenly-ordained universe, which accorded with the Gothic-era view of the world, helps explain their popularity.

The growing interest in astronomy during the 18th century revived interest in astronomical clocks, less for the philosophical message, more for the accurate astronomical information that pendulum-regulated clocks could display.

== Generic description ==
Astronomical clocks vary in design, but share some common features.

=== Time of day ===
How the 24-hour analog dial might be interpreted.

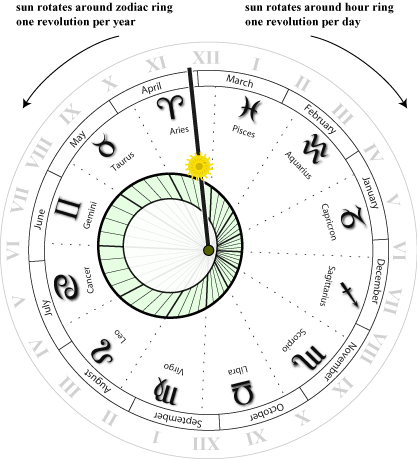
Diagram showing how the zodiac is projected on to the ecliptic dial – the symbols are often drawn inside the dial.

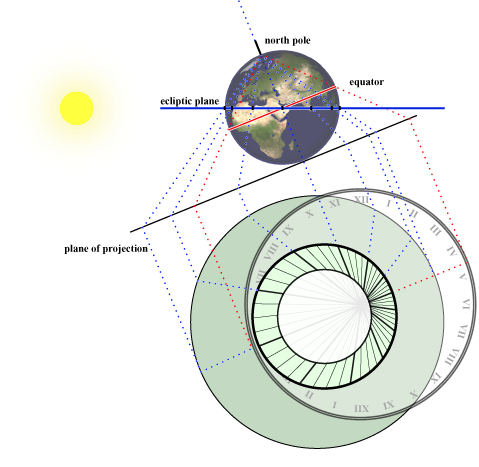
Stereographic projection from the North Pole.

Most astronomical clocks have a 24-hour analog dial around the outside edge, numbered from I to XII in Roman numerals, then from I to XII again. The current time is indicated by a golden ball or an image of the Sun at the end of a pointer. Local noon is usually at the top of the dial, and midnight at the bottom. Minute hands are rarely used.

The Sun indicator or hand gives an approximate indication of both the Sun's azimuth and altitude. For azimuth (bearing from the north), the top of the dial indicates south, and the two VI points indicate east and west. For astronomical clocks designed for use in the Northern Hemisphere, the top represents the zenith and the two VI points define the horizon; this interpretation is most accurate at the equinoxes.

If XII is not at the top of the dial, or if the numbers are Arabic rather than Roman, then the time may be shown in Italian hours (also called Bohemian, or Old Czech, hours). In this system, 1 o'clock occurs at sunset, and counting continues through the night and into the next afternoon, reaching 24 an hour before sunset.

In the lead photograph of the Prague astronomical clock, the time indicated by the Sun hand is about 9 a.m. (IX in Roman numerals), or about the 13th hour (Italian time in Arabic numerals).

=== Calendar and zodiac ===
The year is usually represented by the 12 signs of the zodiac, arranged either as a concentric circle inside the 24-hour dial, or drawn onto a displaced smaller circle, which is a projection of the ecliptic, the path of the Sun and planets through the sky, and the plane of the Earth's orbit.

The ecliptic plane is projected onto the face of the clock, and, because of the Earth's tilted angle of rotation relative to its orbital plane, it is displaced from the center and appears to be distorted. The projection point for the stereographic projection is the North pole; on astrolabes the South pole is more common.

The ecliptic dial makes one complete revolution in 23 hours 56 minutes (a sidereal day), and therefore gradually moves out of phase with the hour hand during the year.

The date is found where the hour hand or Sun disk intersects the ecliptic dial: this indicates the current star sign, or the Sun's current location on the ecliptic. The intersection point slowly moves around the ecliptic dial during the year, as the Sun moves out of one astrological sign into another.

In the diagram showing the clock face on the right, the Sun's disk has recently moved into Aries (the stylized ram's horns), having left Pisces. The date is therefore late March or early April.

If the zodiac signs run around inside the hour hands, either this ring rotates to align itself with the hour hand, or another hand, revolving once per year, points to the Sun's current zodiac sign.

=== Moon ===
A dial or ring indicating the numbers 1 to 29 or 30 shows the Moon's age: a new moon is 0, the Moon waxes until the full moon around day 15, and then wanes until day 29 or 30. The phase is sometimes shown by a rotating globe or black hemisphere, or a window that reveals part of a wavy black shape beneath.

=== Hour lines ===
Unequal hours were the result of dividing up the period of daylight into 12 equal hours and nighttime into another 12. Daylight lasts longer in summer and shorter in winter, so each of the 12 daylight hours is longer than a night hour in summer and shorter than a night hour in winter. These unequal hours are shown by the curved lines radiating from the center. The longer daylight hours in summer can usually be seen at the outer edge of the dial, and the time in unequal hours is read by noting the intersection of the sun hand with the appropriate curved line.

=== Aspects ===
Astrologers considered the arrangement and alignment of the Sun, Moon, and planets in the sky significant. If certain planets appeared at the points of a triangle, hexagon, or square, or if they were opposite or next to each other, the appropriate aspect was used to determine the event's significance. On some clocks, the common aspects – triangle, square, and hexagon – are drawn inside the central disc, with each line marked by the symbol for that aspect; the signs for conjunction and opposition may also appear. On an astrolabe, the corners of the different aspects could be lined up on any of the planets. On a clock, however, the disc containing the aspect lines cannot be rotated at will, so they usually show only the aspects of the Sun or Moon.

On the Torre dell'Orologio, Brescia clock in northern Italy, the triangle, square, and star in the centre of the dial show these aspects (the third, fourth, and sixth phases) of (presumably) the moon.

=== "Dragon" hand: eclipse prediction and lunar nodes ===
The Moon's orbit is not in the same plane as the Earth's orbit around the Sun but crosses it in two places. The Moon crosses the ecliptic plane twice a month, once when it passes above the plane, and again approximately 15 days later when it passes below the ecliptic. These two locations are the ascending and descending lunar nodes. Solar and lunar eclipses will occur only when the Moon is positioned near one of these nodes because at other times the Moon is either too high or too low for an eclipse to be seen on the Earth.

Some astronomical clocks keep track of the position of the lunar nodes with a long pointer that crosses the dial, with its length extended out to both sides of the dial to pointing at two opposite points on the solar or lunar dial. This so-called "dragon" hand makes one complete rotation around the ecliptic dial every 19 years. It is sometimes decorated with a serpent or lizard (Greek: drakon) with its snout and tail-tip touching the outer dial, traditionally labelled Latin: "caput draconam" and Latin: "cauda draconam" even if the decorative dragon is omitted (not to be confused with the similar-seeming names of the two sections of the constellation Serpens).

During the two yearly eclipse seasons the Sun pointer coincides with either the dragon's snout or tail. When the dragon hand and the full Moon coincide, the Moon is on the same plane as the Earth and Sun, so a lunar eclipse may be visible on one side of the Earth. When the new Moon is aligned with the dragon hand, a solar eclipse may be visible somewhere on the Earth.

== Historical examples ==
=== Su Song's Cosmic Engine ===
The Science Museum (London) has a scale model of the "Cosmic Engine", which Su Song, a Chinese polymath, designed and constructed in China in 1092. This astronomical hydromechanical clock tower was about ten metres high (about 30 feet) and featured a clock escapement and was indirectly powered by a rotating wheel either with falling water and liquid mercury, which freezes at a much lower temperature than water, allowing operation of the clock during colder weather. A full-sized working replica of Su Song's clock exists in the Republic of China (Taiwan)'s National Museum of Natural Science, Taichung city. This full-scale, fully functional replica, approximately 12 meters (39 feet) in height, was constructed from Su Song's original descriptions and mechanical drawings.

=== Astrarium of Giovanni Dondi dell'Orologio ===
The Astrarium of Giovanni Dondi dell'Orologio was a complex astronomical clock built between 1348 and 1364 in Padua, Italy, by the doctor and clock-maker Giovanni Dondi dell'Orologio. The Astrarium had seven faces and 107 moving gears; it showed the positions of the Sun, the Moon and the five planets then known, as well as religious feast days. The astrarium stood about 1 metre high, and consisted of a seven-sided brass or iron framework resting on 7 decorative paw-shaped feet. The lower section provided a 24-hour dial and a large calendar drum, showing the fixed feasts of the church, the movable feasts, and the position in the zodiac of the moon's ascending node. The upper section contained 7 dials, each about 30 cm in diameter, showing the positional data for the Primum Mobile, Venus, Mercury, the moon, Saturn, Jupiter, and Mars. Directly above the 24-hour dial is the dial of the Primum Mobile, so called because it reproduces the diurnal motion of the stars and the annual motion of the sun against the background of stars. Each of the 'planetary' dials used complex clockwork to produce reasonably accurate models of the planets' motion. These models agreed reasonably well with both Ptolemaic theory and observations. For example, Dondi's dial for Mercury uses a number of intermediate wheels, including: a wheel with 146 teeth, and a wheel with 63 internal (facing inwards) teeth that meshed with a 20 tooth pinion.

== Interior clocks and watches ==
=== The Rasmus Sørnes Clock ===
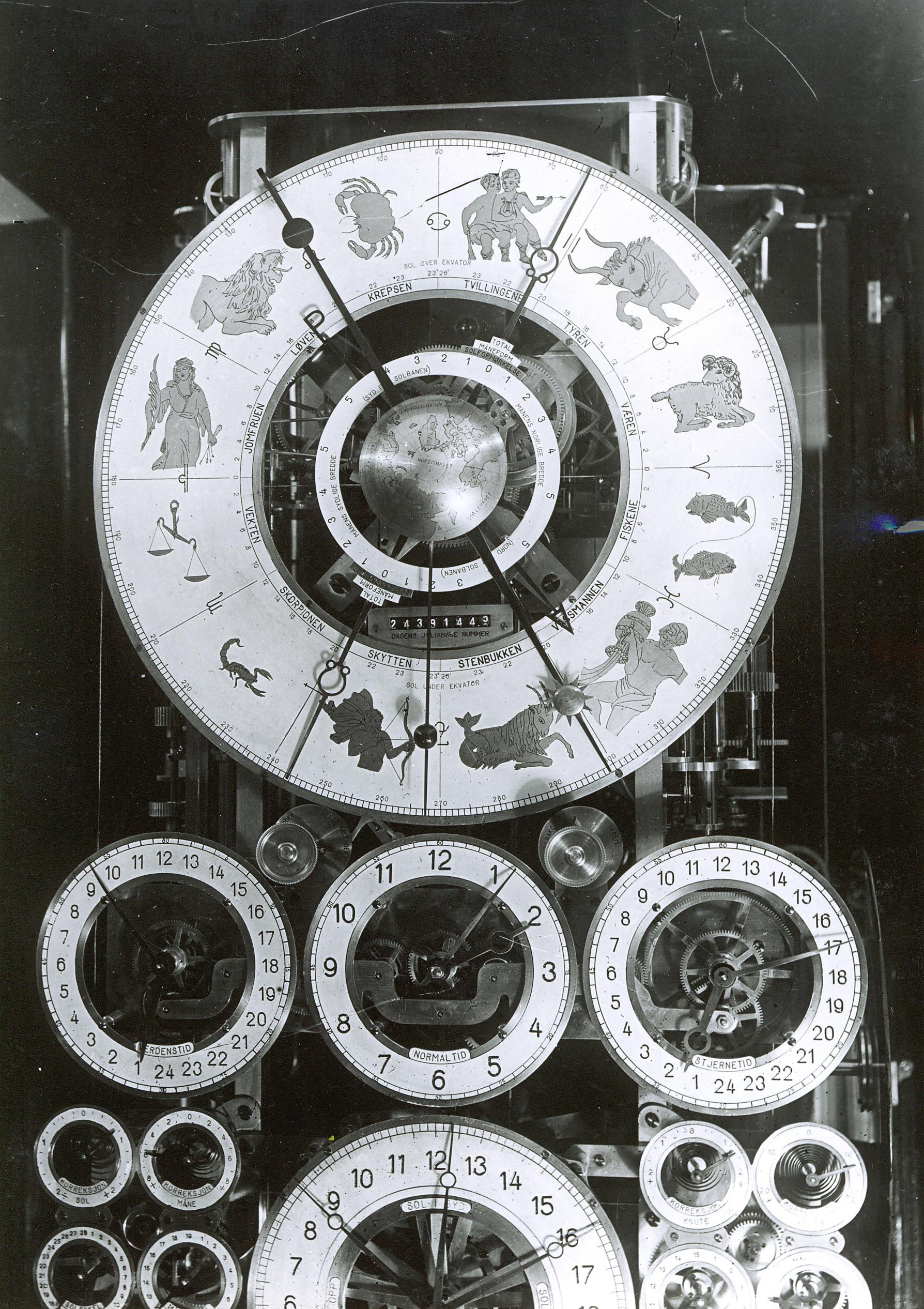
The Rasmus Sørnes Clock.

The last of four astronomical clocks designed and made by Norwegian Rasmus Sørnes (1893–1967) is highly complex, but housed in a casing measuring only 0.70 × 0.60 × 2.10 m. Features include locations of the Sun and Moon in the zodiac, Julian calendar, Gregorian calendar, sidereal time, GMT, local time with daylight saving time and leap year, solar and lunar cycle corrections, eclipses, local sunrise and sunset, moon phase, tides, sunspot cycles and a planetarium including Pluto's 248-year orbit and the 25 800-year periods of the polar ecliptics (precession of the Earth's axis). All wheels are in brass and gold-plated. Dials are silver-plated. The clock has an electromechanical pendulum.

Sørnes also made the necessary tools and based his work on his own astronomical observations. Having been exhibited at the Time Museum in Rockford, Illinois (since closed), and at the Chicago Museum of Science and Industry, the clock was sold in 2002 and its current location is not known. The Rasmus Sørnes Astronomical Clock No. 3, the precursor to the Chicago Clock, his tools, patents, drawings, telescope, and other items, are exhibited at the Borgarsyssel Museum in Sarpsborg, Norway.

=== Table clocks ===
Astronomical table clocks were popular as showpieces, and many examples survive. To become a master clockmaker in 17th-century Augsburg, candidates had to design and build a 'masterpiece' clock, an astronomical table-top clock of formidable complexity. Examples are held by museums such as London's British Museum.

Edmund Scientific and other retailers have offered a mechanical Tellurium clock, perhaps the first mechanical astronomical clock to be mass-marketed.

In Japan, Tanaka Hisashige made a Myriad year clock in 1851.

=== Watches ===
Independent clockmaker Christiaan van der Klaauw created a wristwatch astrolabe, the "Astrolabium" in addition to the "Planetarium 2000", the "Eclipse 2001" and the "Real Moon." Ulysse Nardin also sells several astronomical wristwatches, the "Astrolabium," "Planetarium", and the "Tellurium J. Kepler."

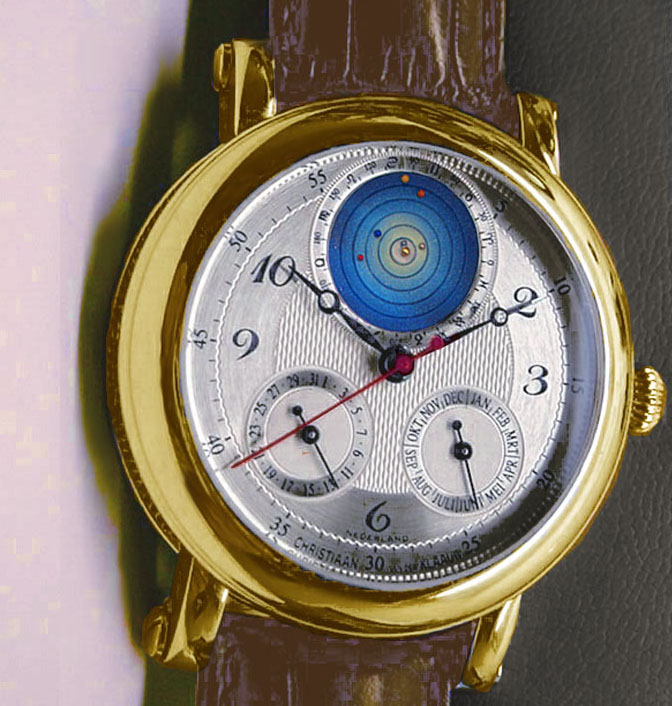
Christiaan van der Klaauw
Planetarium 2000

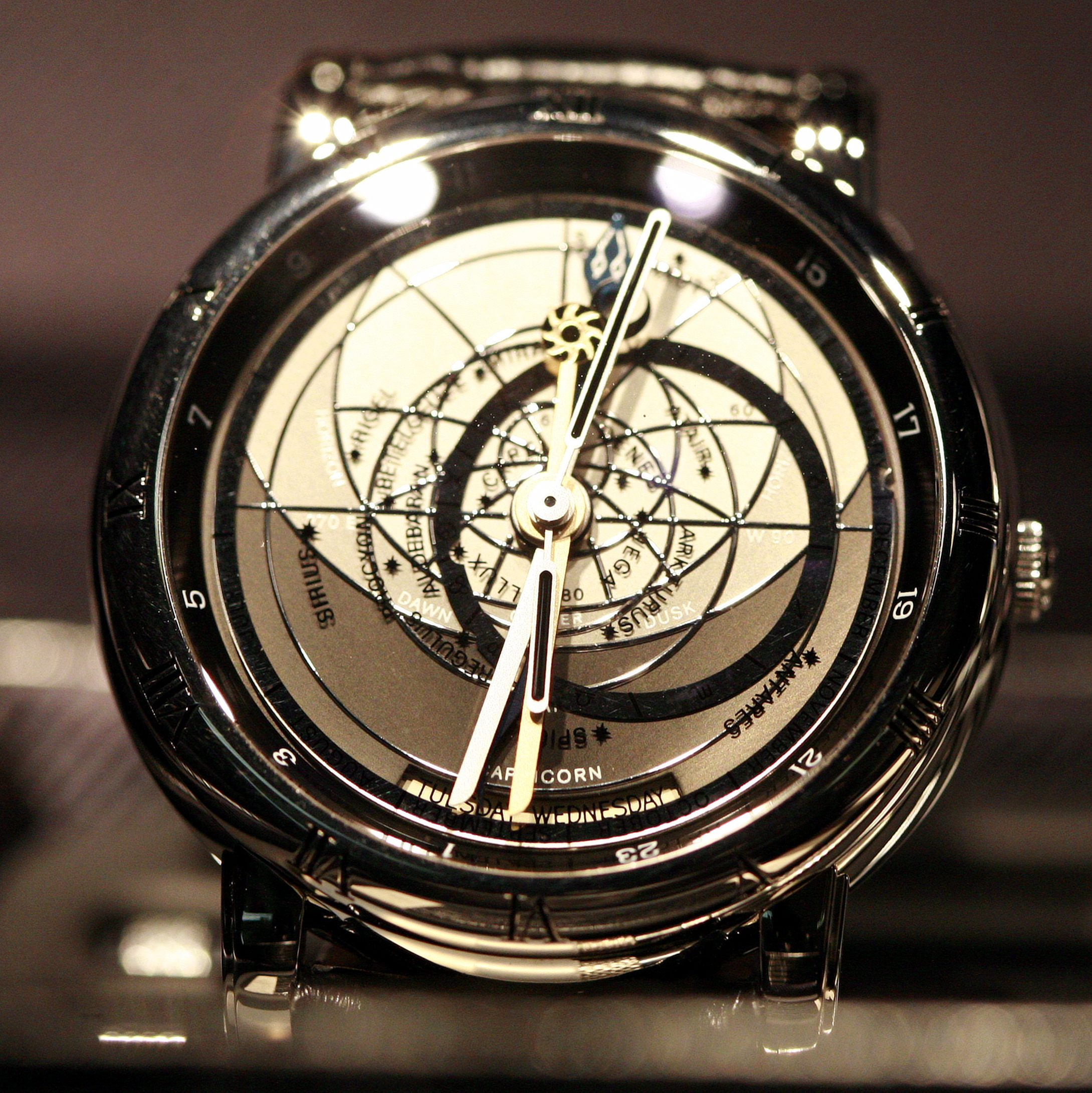
Ulysse Nardin Astrolabium Galileo Galilei

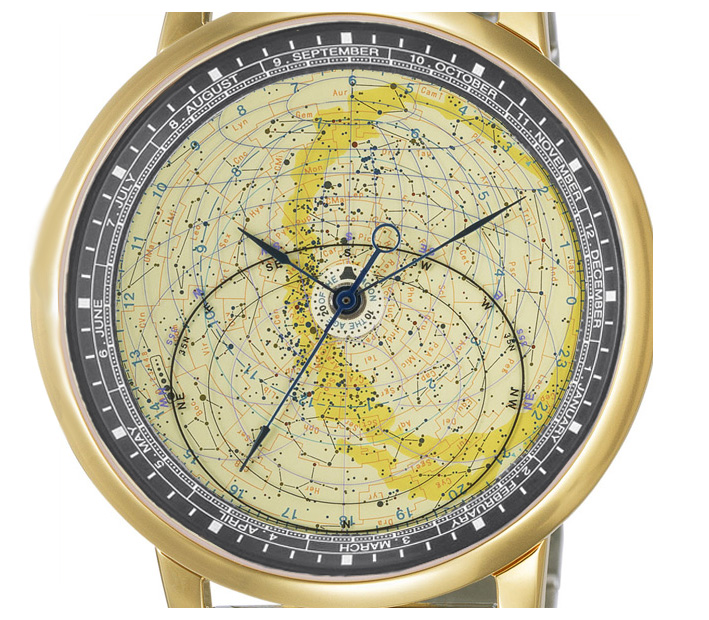
Citizen Cosmosign

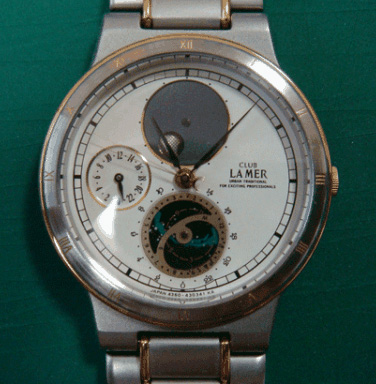
Citizen Moonsign

=== Other examples ===
Two of Holland America's cruise ships, the MS Rotterdam and the MS Amsterdam, both have large astronomical clocks as central features in the ships' atriums.

== Examples by country ==
=== Austria ===
- Innsbruck. The astronomical clock in the gable of 17–19 Maria-Theresien-Strasse is a 20th-century copy of the astronomical clock of the Ulm Rathaus in Germany.
- Peuerbach. The facade of Peuerbach Town Hall features an astrolabe clock, an enlarged copy of Georg von Peuerbach's original astrolabe of 1457.

=== Belgium ===
- Lier. The Zimmer tower houses an astronomical clock installed by Louis Zimmer in 1930. On twelve dials surrounding a central clockface, it gives indications including the time around the world, the date, the moon phase, and the equation of time, and includes a tide clock.
- Senzeilles. The Senzeilles astronomical clock was constructed by self-taught Lucien Charloteaux between 1896 and 1912. A domestic clock housed in a wooden case, it gives indications including the solar, mean and sidereal time around the world, the positions of the constellations and planets, and the appearance of Halley's Comet.
- Sint-Truiden. The astronomical clock constructed by Kamiel Festraets between 1937 and 1942 is now housed in the Festraets Museum.
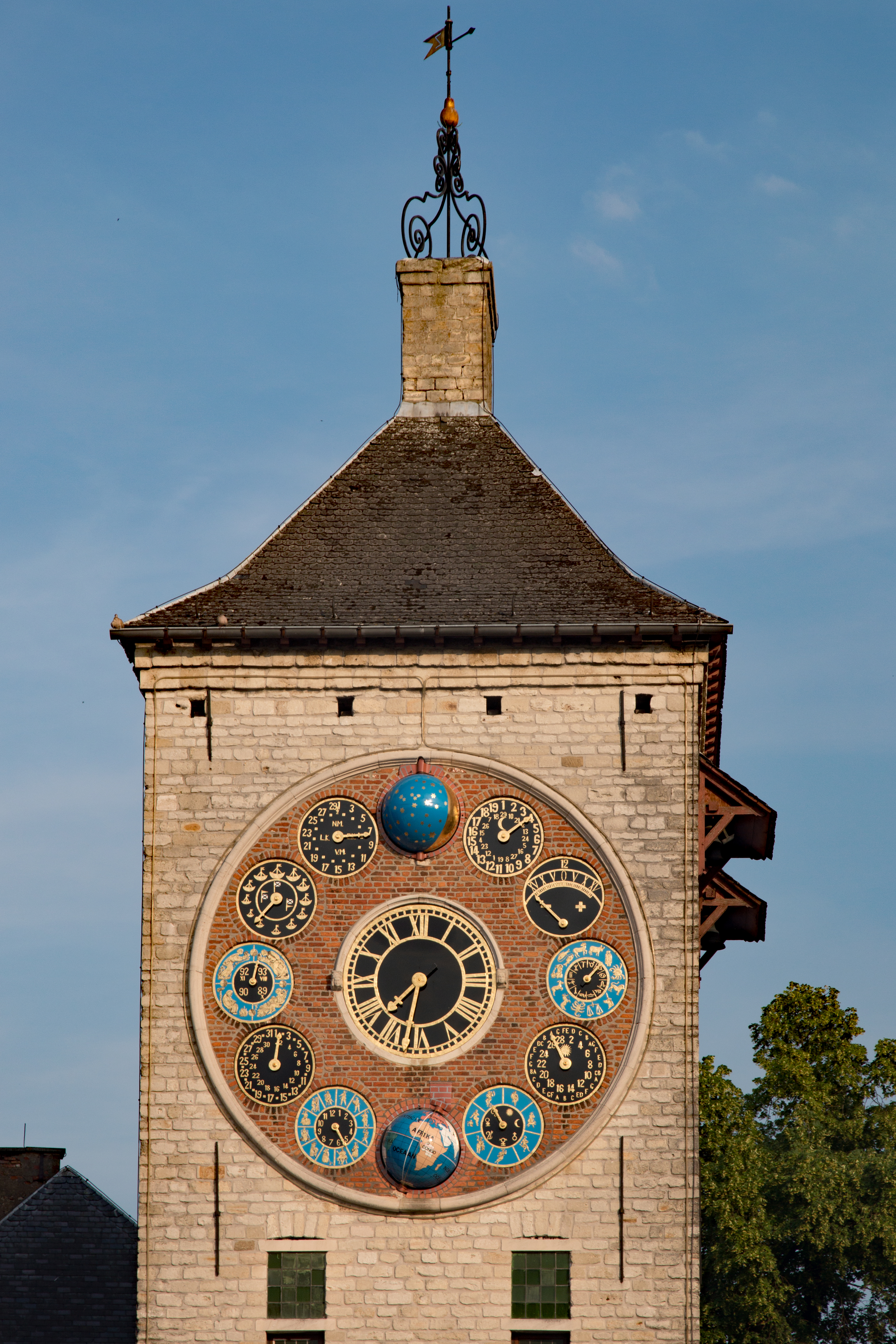
Zimmer tower in Lier, Belgium

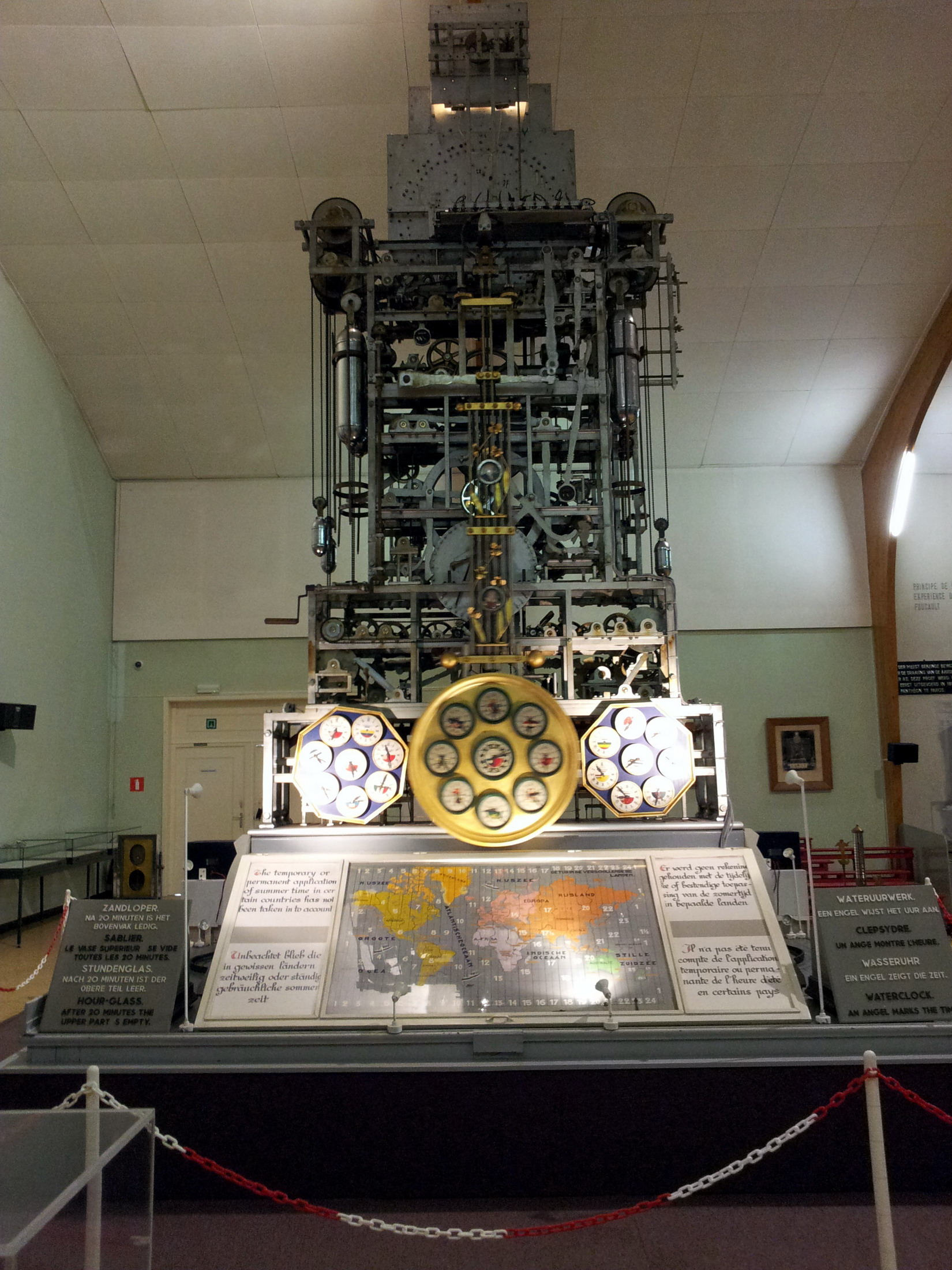
Sint-Truiden clock

=== Croatia ===
- Dubrovnik. The Dubrovnik Bell Tower constructed in 1444 has housed a clock since its creation, though due to earthquake damage, both the tower and the clock were replaced in 1929. A rotating moon ball shows the lunar phase.
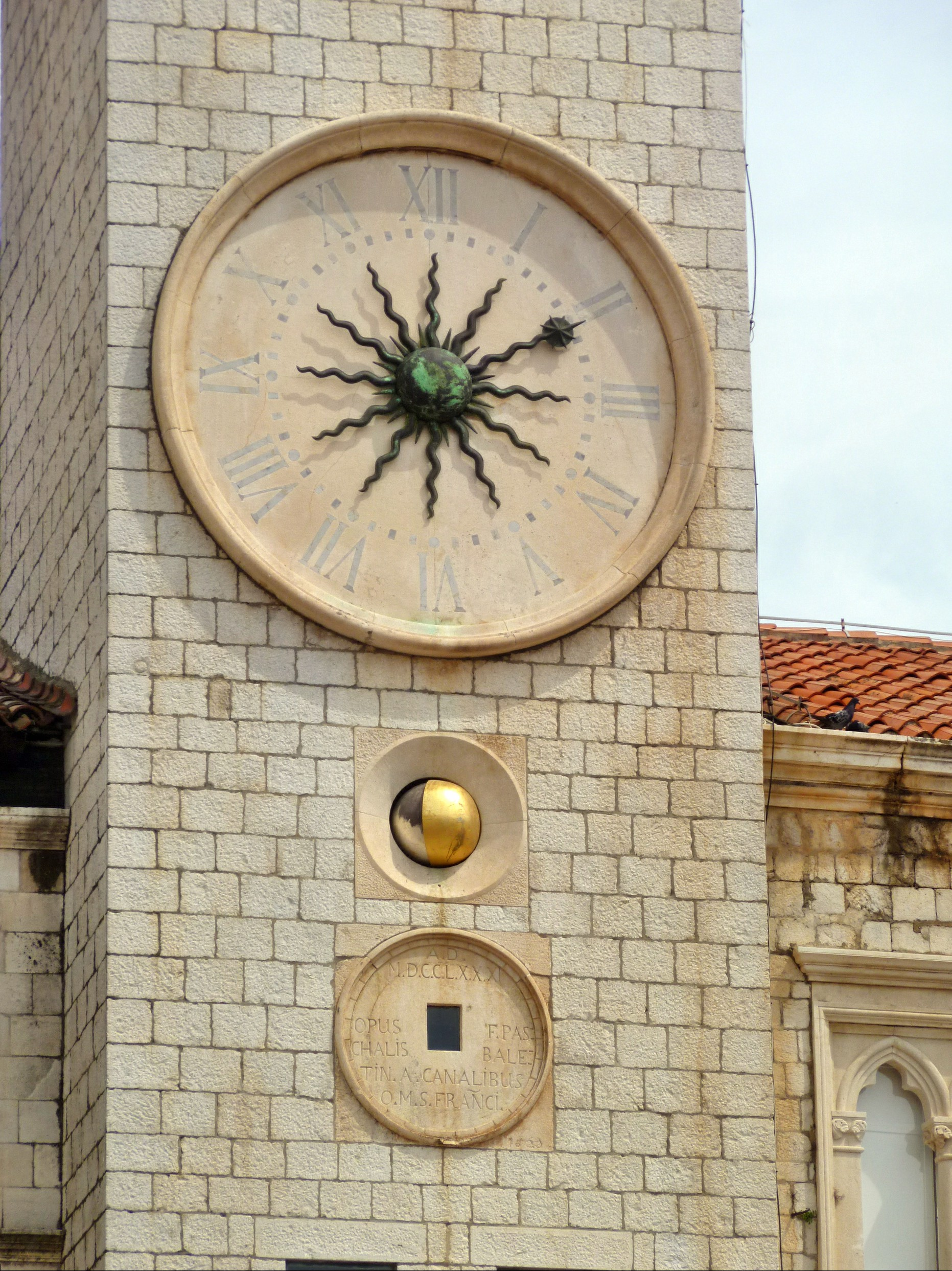
Dubrovnik

=== Czech Republic ===
- Prague. The Prague astronomical clock is located at the Old Town Hall. The central section was completed in 1410, the calendar dial was added in 1490. The clock was renovated after damage during World War II, and in 1979. On the hour, Death strikes the time, and the twelve apostles appear at the doors above the clock.
- Olomouc. The Olomouc astronomical clock at the Town Hall is a rare example of a heliocentric astronomical clock. According to legend, the clock dates to 1422, but it is first mentioned in historical records in 1517. It was remodelled approximately once every century; in 1898 the astrolabe was replaced with a heliocentric model of the solar system. Badly damaged by the retreating German army in 1945, the clock was remodelled in socialist realism style in 1955, under the Communist government. The religious and royal figures were replaced with athletes, workers, farmers, scientists, and other members of the proletariat.
- Litomyšl. The tower of the Old Town Hall has an art nouveau astronomical clock, installed in 1907.
- Prostějov. The astronomical clock in the tower of the New Town Hall was installed in 1910.
- Kryštofovo Údolí. The Kryštofovo Údolí astronomical clock is a modern astronomical clock (inaugurated in 2008), built in a former electrical substation.
- Hojsova Stráž. An astronomical clock in the Bohemian Forest was inaugurated in 2017. It has a concentric dial showing the 24-hour time, the date and zodiac, and the moon phase, as well as a star map dial with a dragon hand; it also indicates the time of sunrise and sunset.
- Třebíč. The Třebíč Astronomical Observatory has a modern astronomical clock that shows the time in world cities, the time of sunrise and sunset, the date and zodiac, and the orbits of the planets.
- Žatec. The Temple to Hops and Beer, a museum and amusement complex dedicated to beer, has an astronomical clock on which the zodiac indication illustrates the annual processes of beer production.
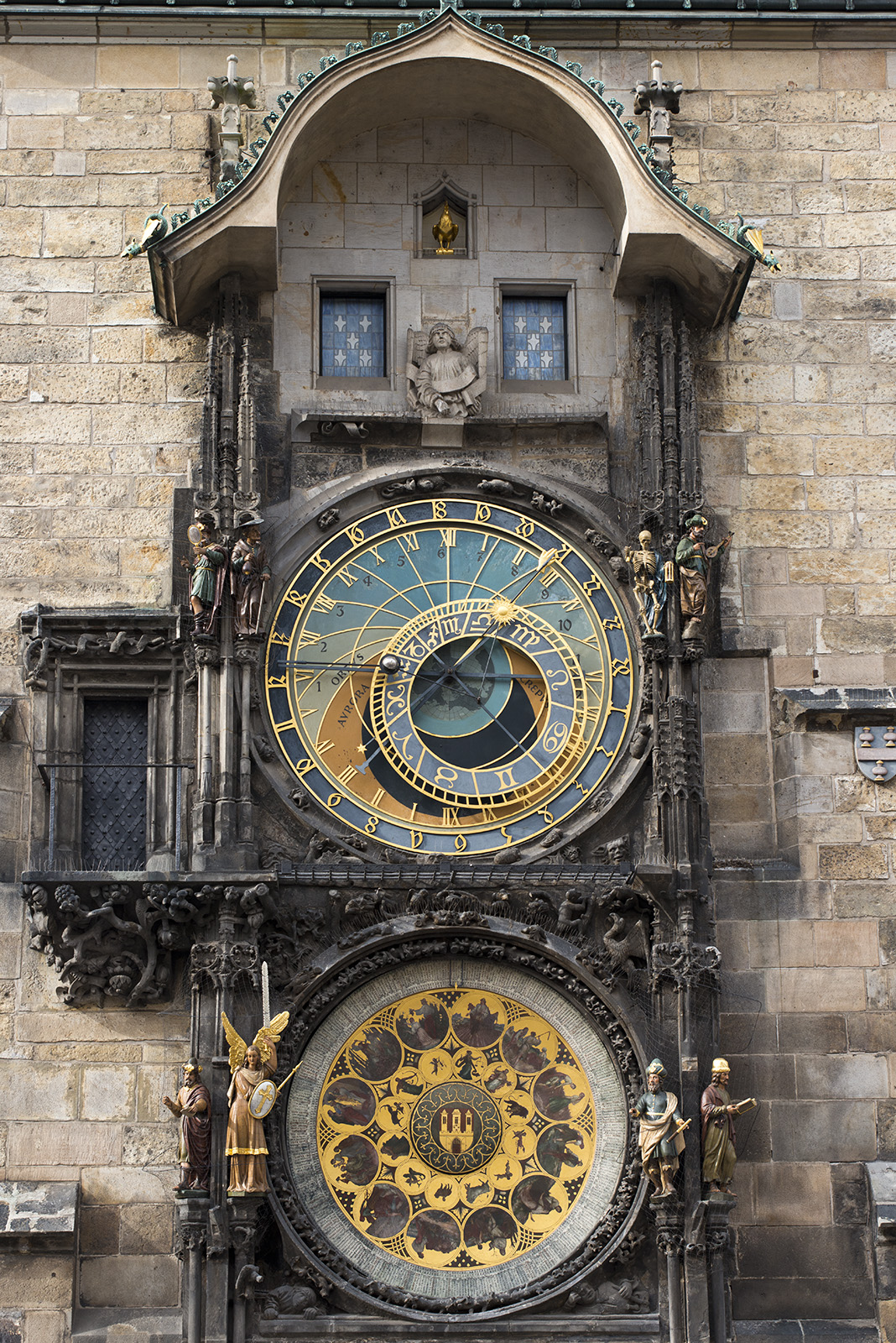
Prague astronomical clock

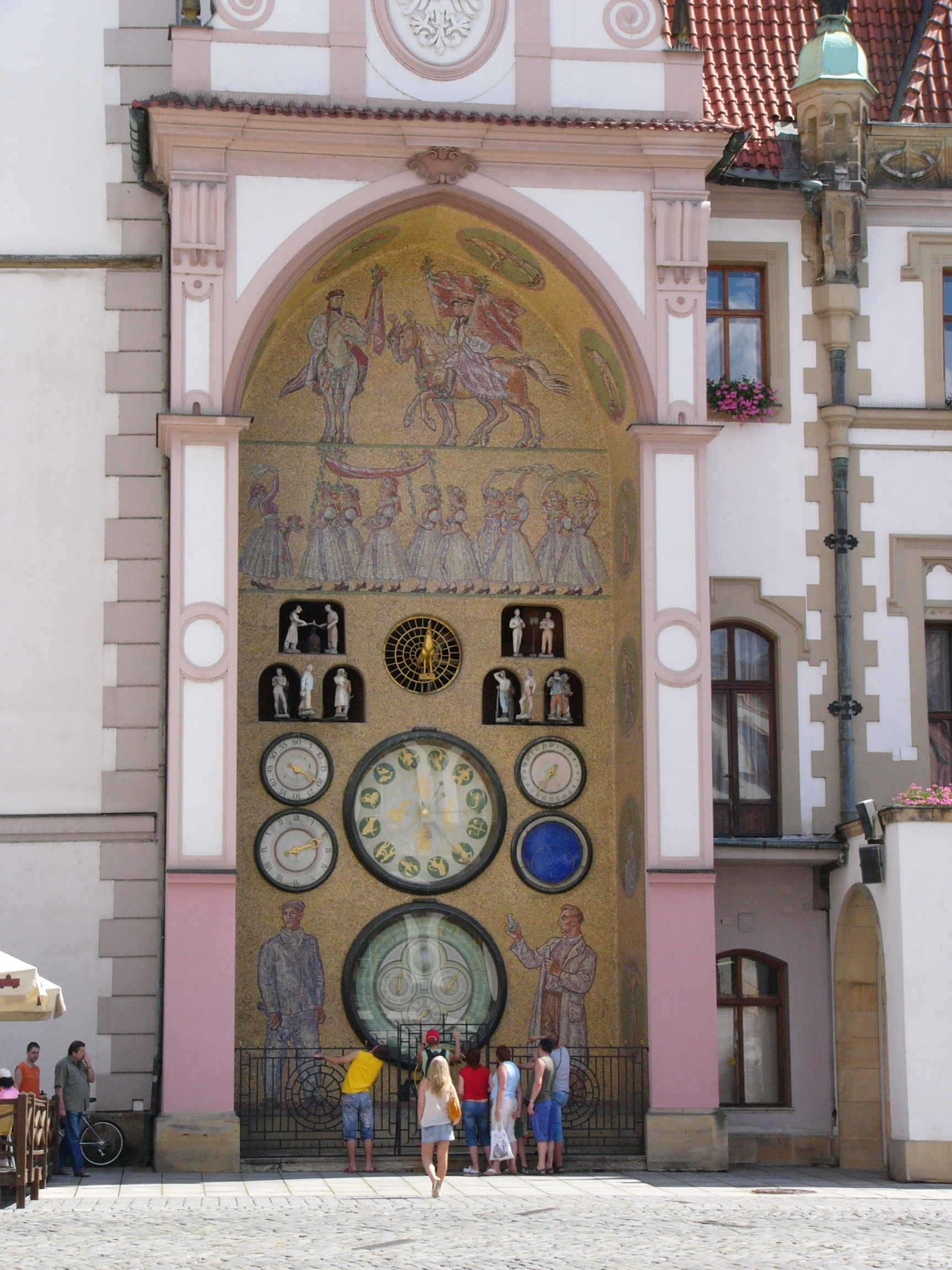
Olomouc astronomical clock

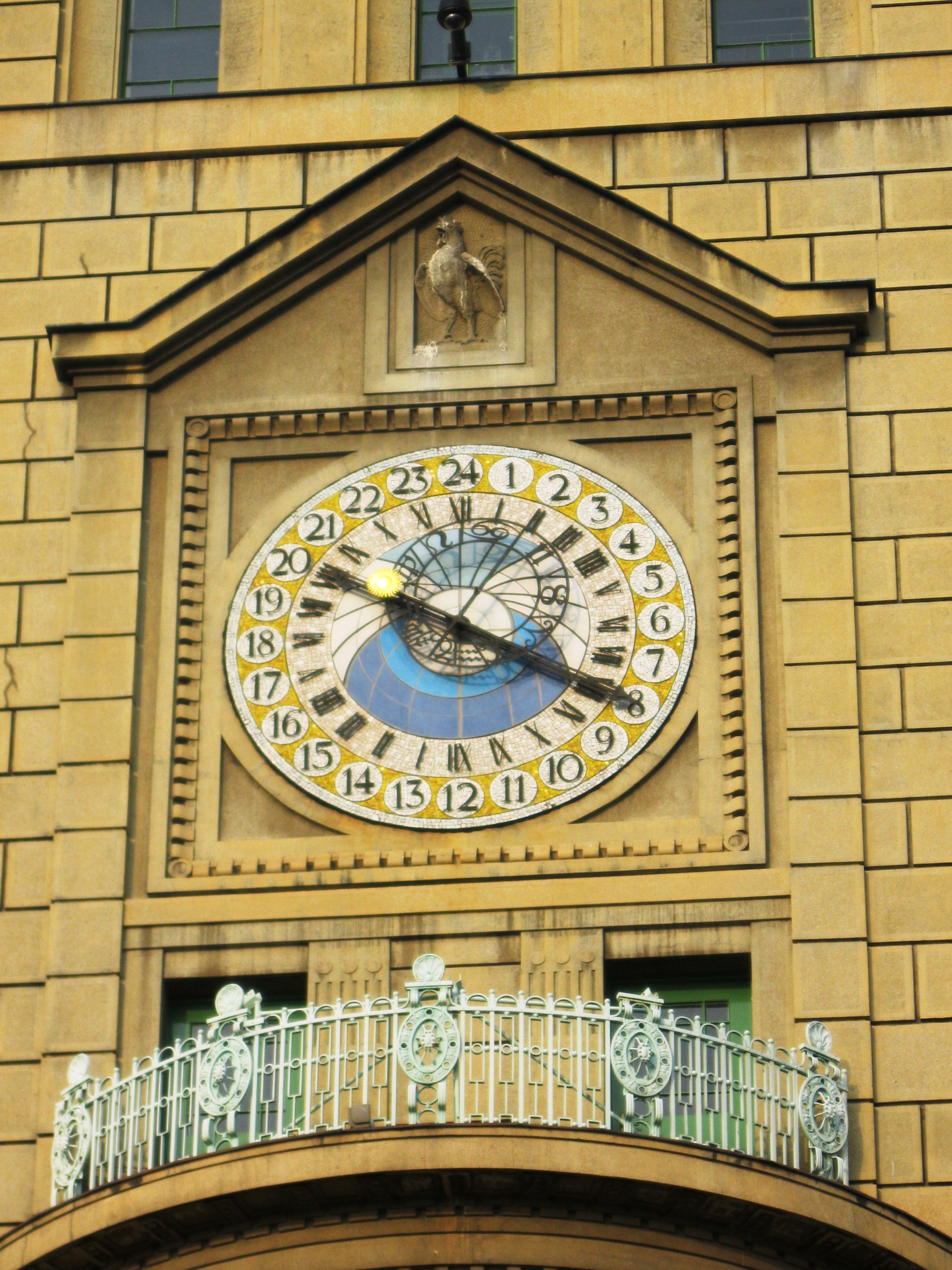
Prostějov clock

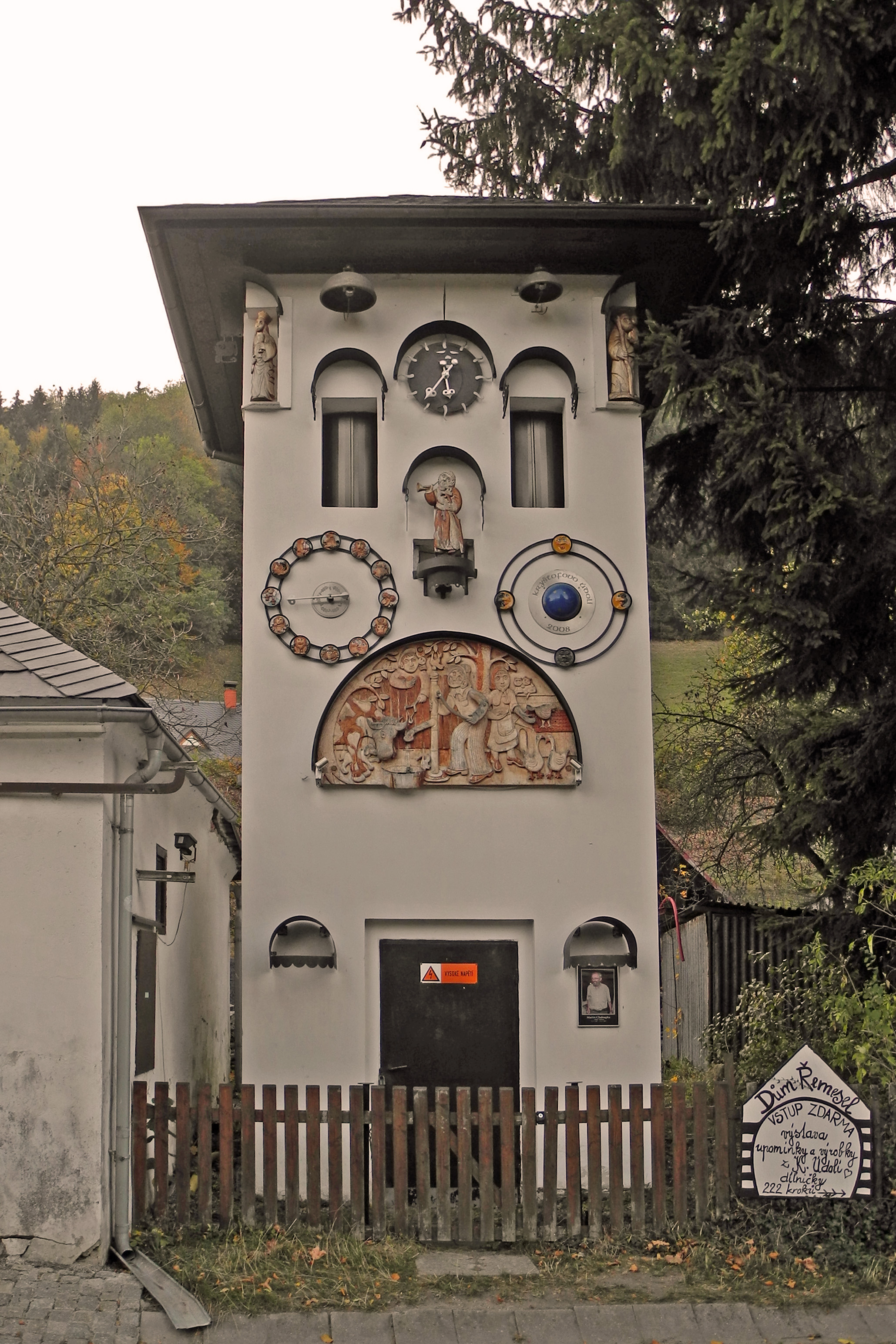
Kryštofovo Údolí astronomical clock

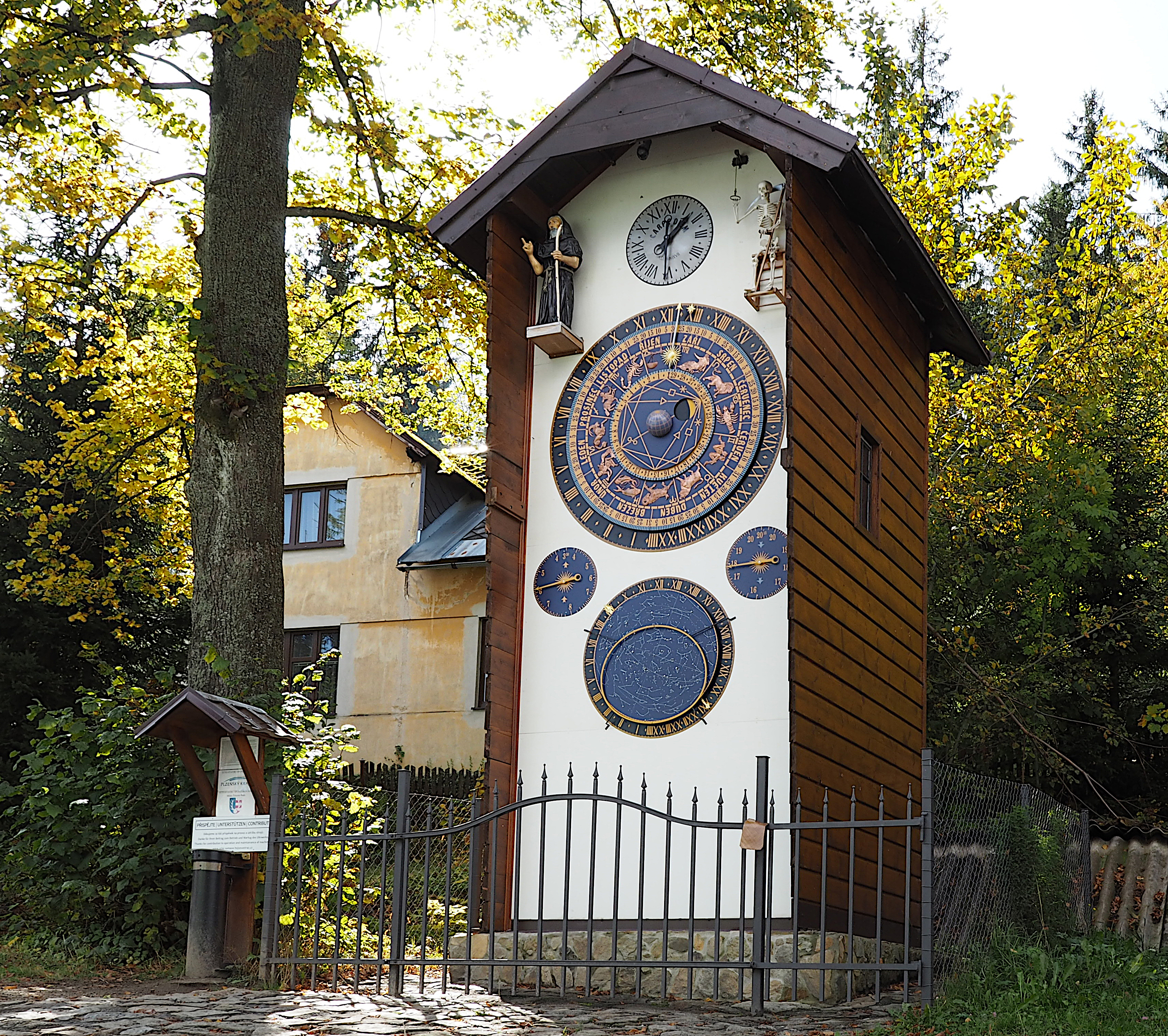
Hojsova Stráž clock

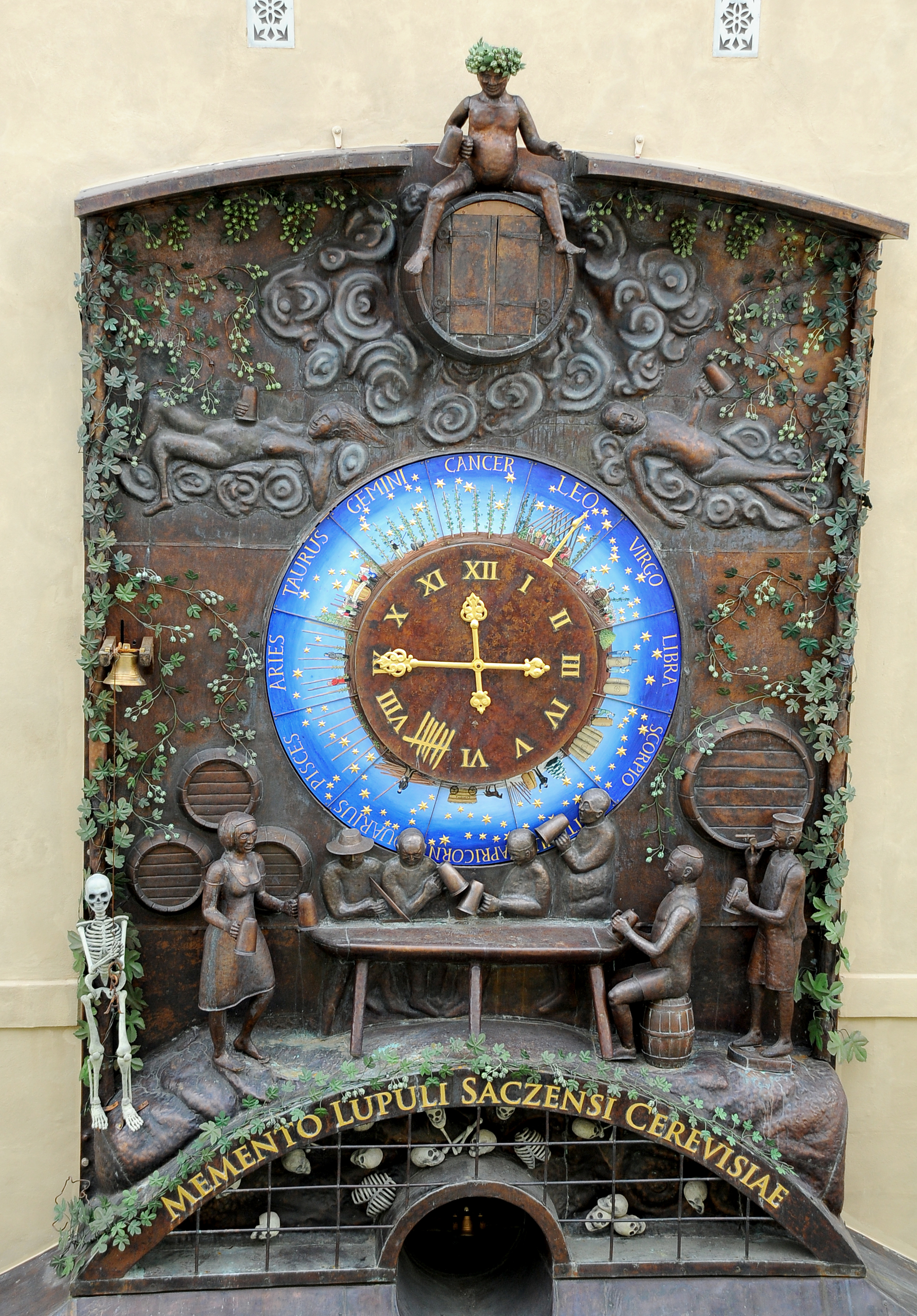
Žatec clock

=== Denmark ===
- Copenhagen. Jens Olsen's World Clock in Copenhagen City Hall was designed by Jens Olsen and assembled from 1948 to 1955.
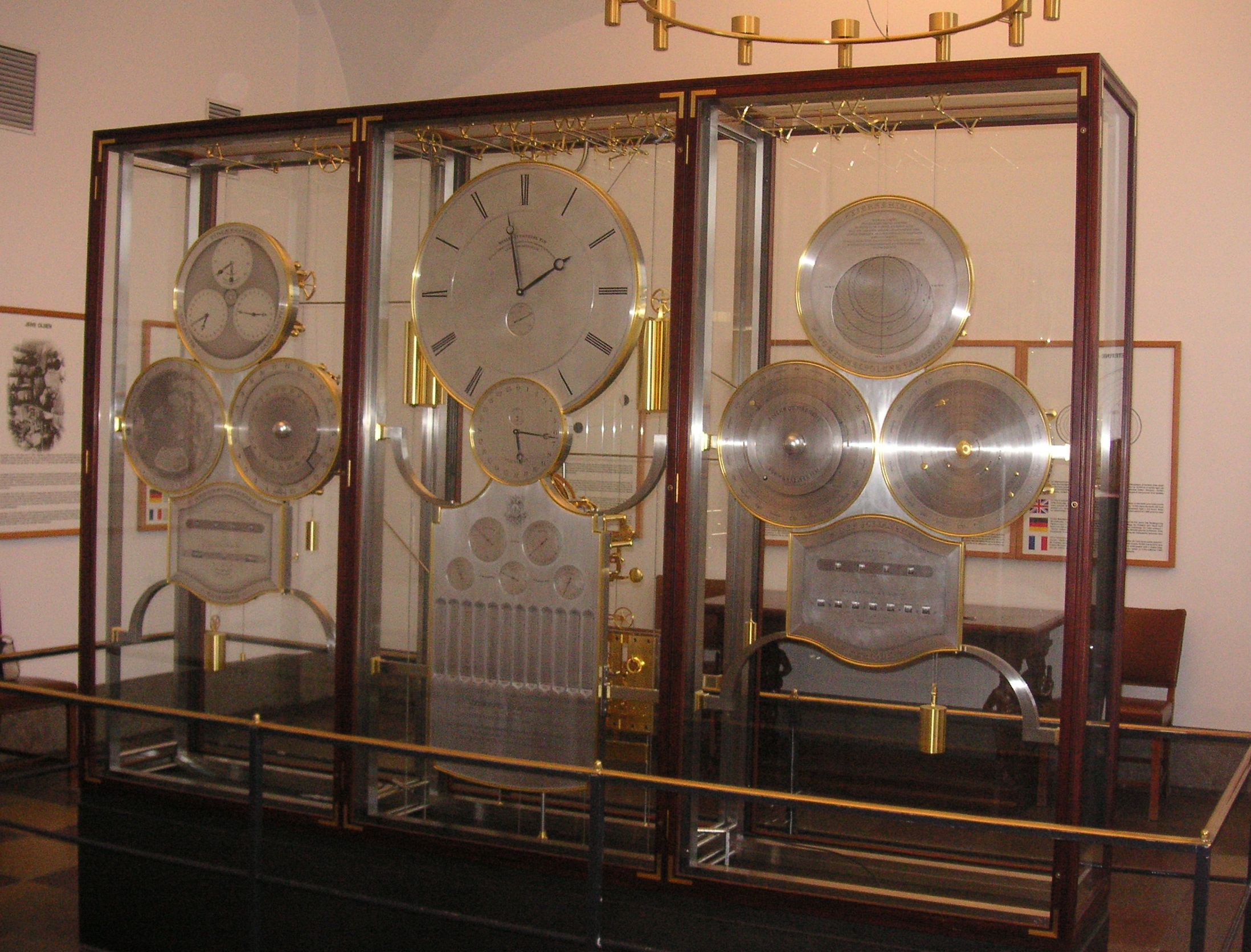
Jens Olsen's World Clock, Copenhagen

=== France ===
- Auxerre. The 15th-century clock in the Tour de l'Horloge has a 24-hour sun hand and a moon hand that completes a revolution in a lunar day of 24 hours 50 minutes, and shows the lunar phase on a rotating moon ball.
- Beauvais. The Beauvais astronomical clock in Beauvais Cathedral, constructed 1865–1868 by Auguste-Lucien Vérité, has 52 dials that display the times of sunrise, sunset, moonrise, moonset, the phases of the moon, the solstices, the positions of the planets, the current time in 18 cities around the world, and the tidal hours. Its 68 automata enact the Last Judgement on the hour.
- Besançon. The Besançon astronomical clock in Besançon Cathedral (1860) was also constructed by Auguste-Lucien Vérité. Its 70 dials provide 122 indications.
- Bourges. The Bourges astronomical clock in Bourges Cathedral was installed in 1424. It shows the zodiac, and the moon phase and age.
- Chartres. The Chartres astronomical clock in Chartres Cathedral is an astrolabe clock, installed in 1528. It was overhauled, its mechanism replaced by an electric mechanism, in 2009.
- Haguenau. The facade of the Musée alsacien displays an astronomical clock, a modern copy of the clock of the Ulm Rathaus.
- Lyon. The Lyon astronomical clock in Lyon Cathedral was constructed in 1661, replacing a 14th-century original. It has an astrolabe dial and a calendar dial.
- Munster. The Church of Saint-Léger houses the Clock of Creation, installed in 2008. It shows the time, the day of the week, the month and zodiac, and the moon phase.
- Ploërmel. The Ploërmel astronomical clock, constructed 1850–1855, comprises an astronomical clock with 10 dials and an orrery.
- Rouen. The Gros Horloge has a movement built in 1389, with a dial added in 1529. It indicates the moon phase on a rotating sphere above the dial, and the day of the week in an aperture at the base of the dial.
- Saint-Omer. The Saint-Omer astronomical clock in Saint-Omer Cathedral is an astrolabe clock of 1558.
- Strasbourg. The Strasbourg astronomical clock is the third clock housed in Strasbourg Cathedral, following 14th-century and 16th-century predecessors. It was constructed by Jean-Baptiste Schwilgué from 1838 to 1843, and shows many astronomical and calendrical functions (including what is thought to be the first complete mechanization of the computus needed to compute Easter) and several automata.
- Versailles. The Passemant astronomical clock in the Palace of Versailles near Paris is a rococo astronomical clock sitting on a formal low marble base. It took 12 years for a clockmaker and an engineer to build and was presented to Louis XV in 1754.
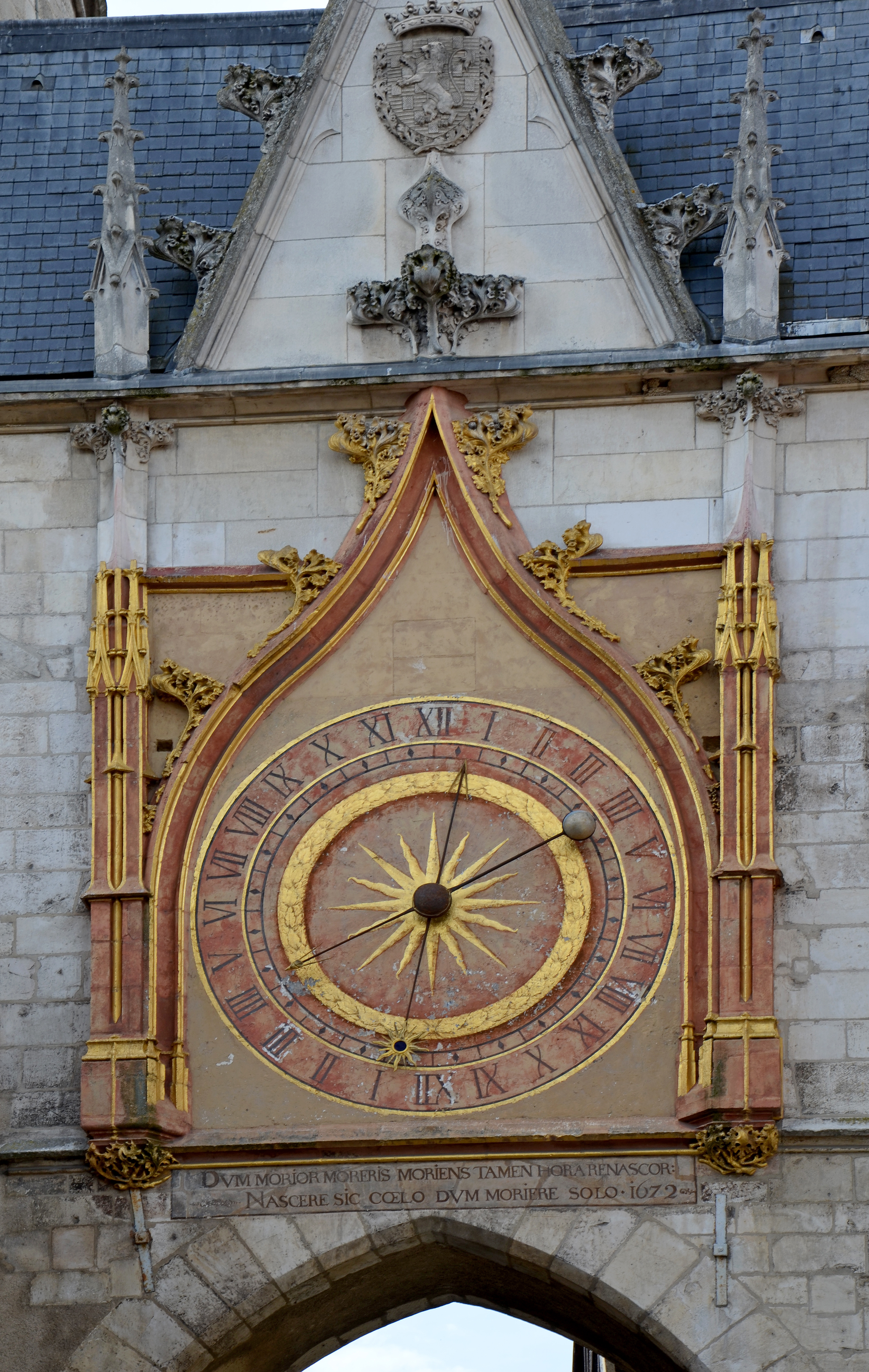
Tour de l'Horloge, Auxerre

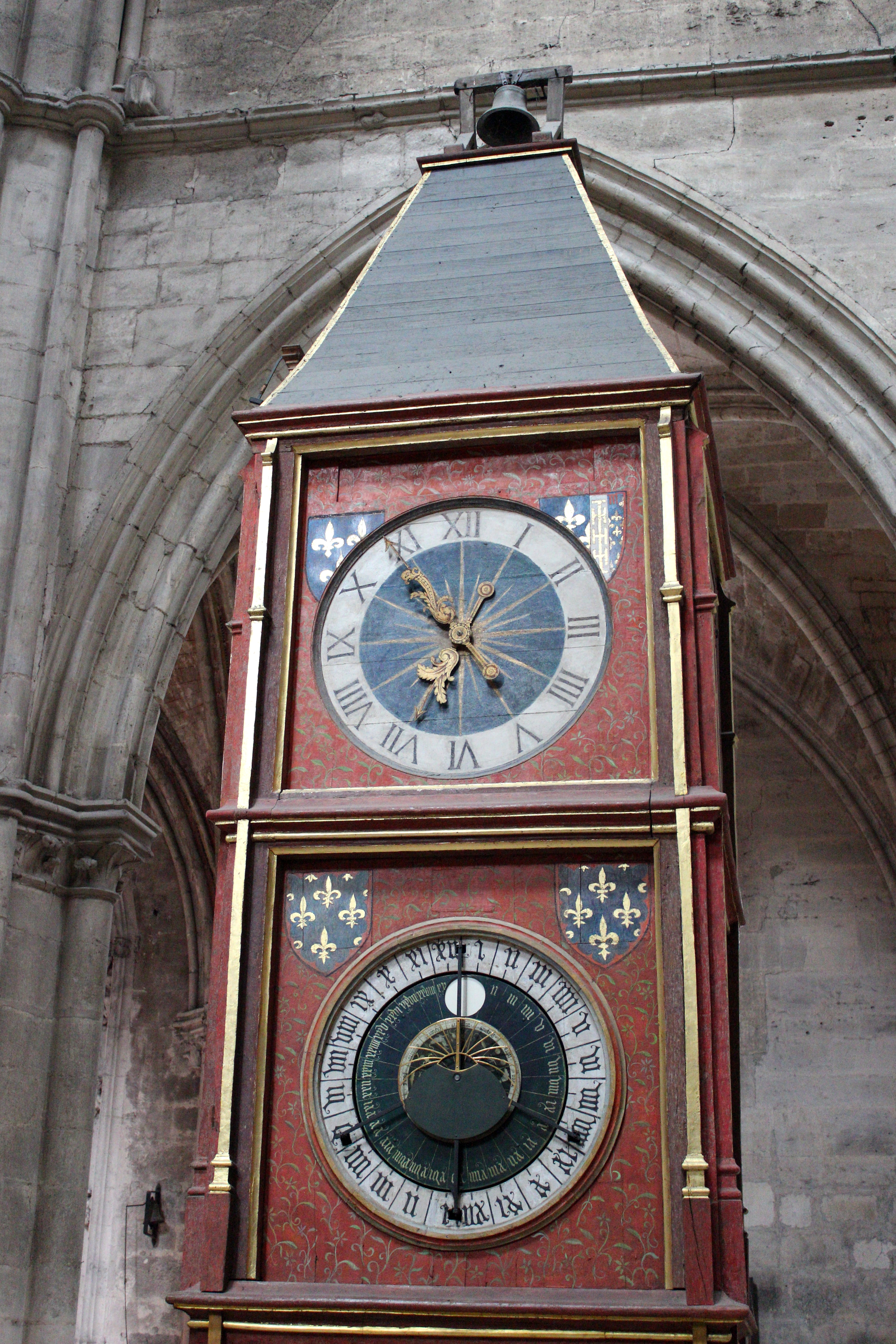
Bourges astronomical clock in Bourges Cathedral

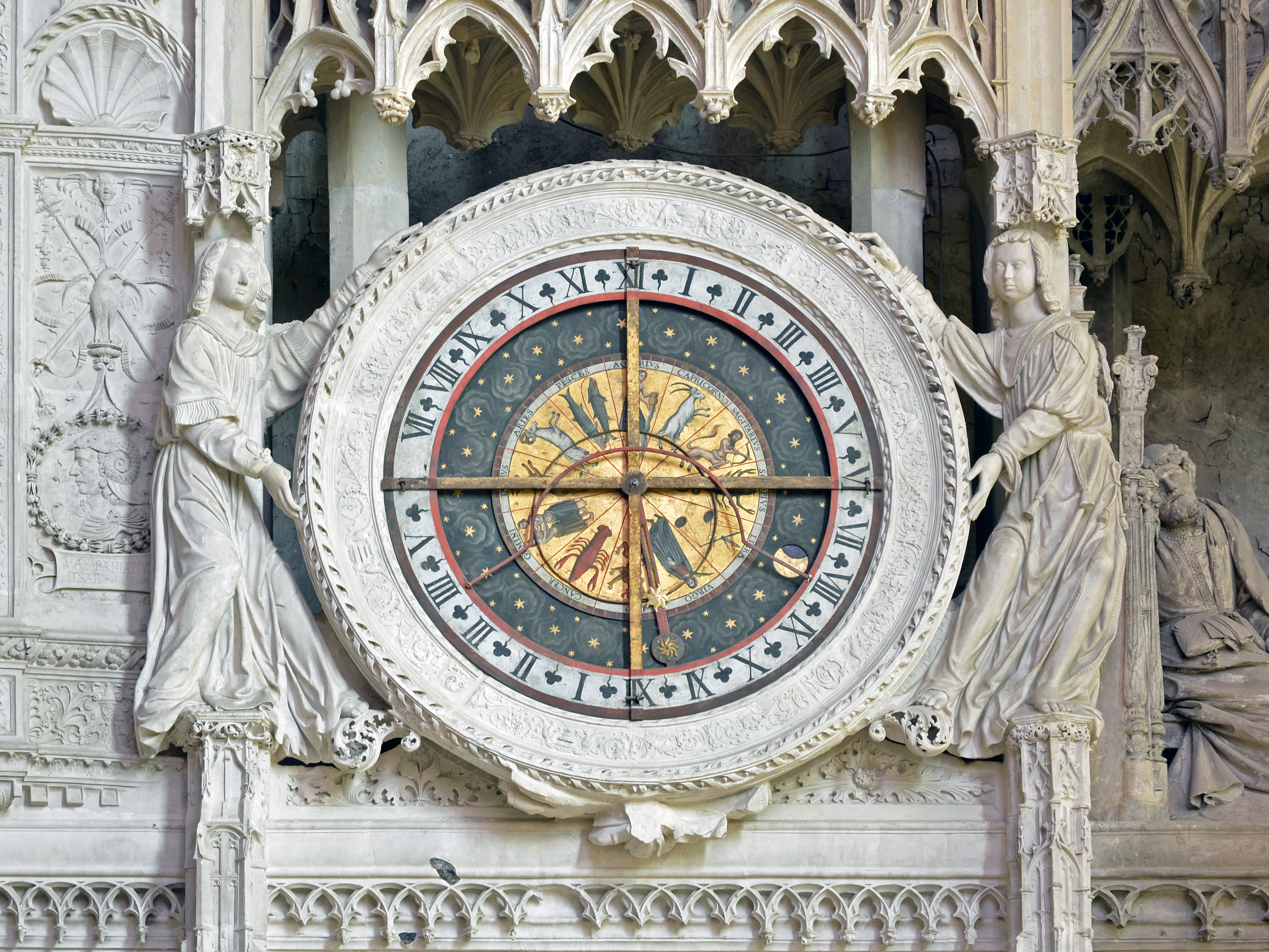
Clock at Chartres Cathedral

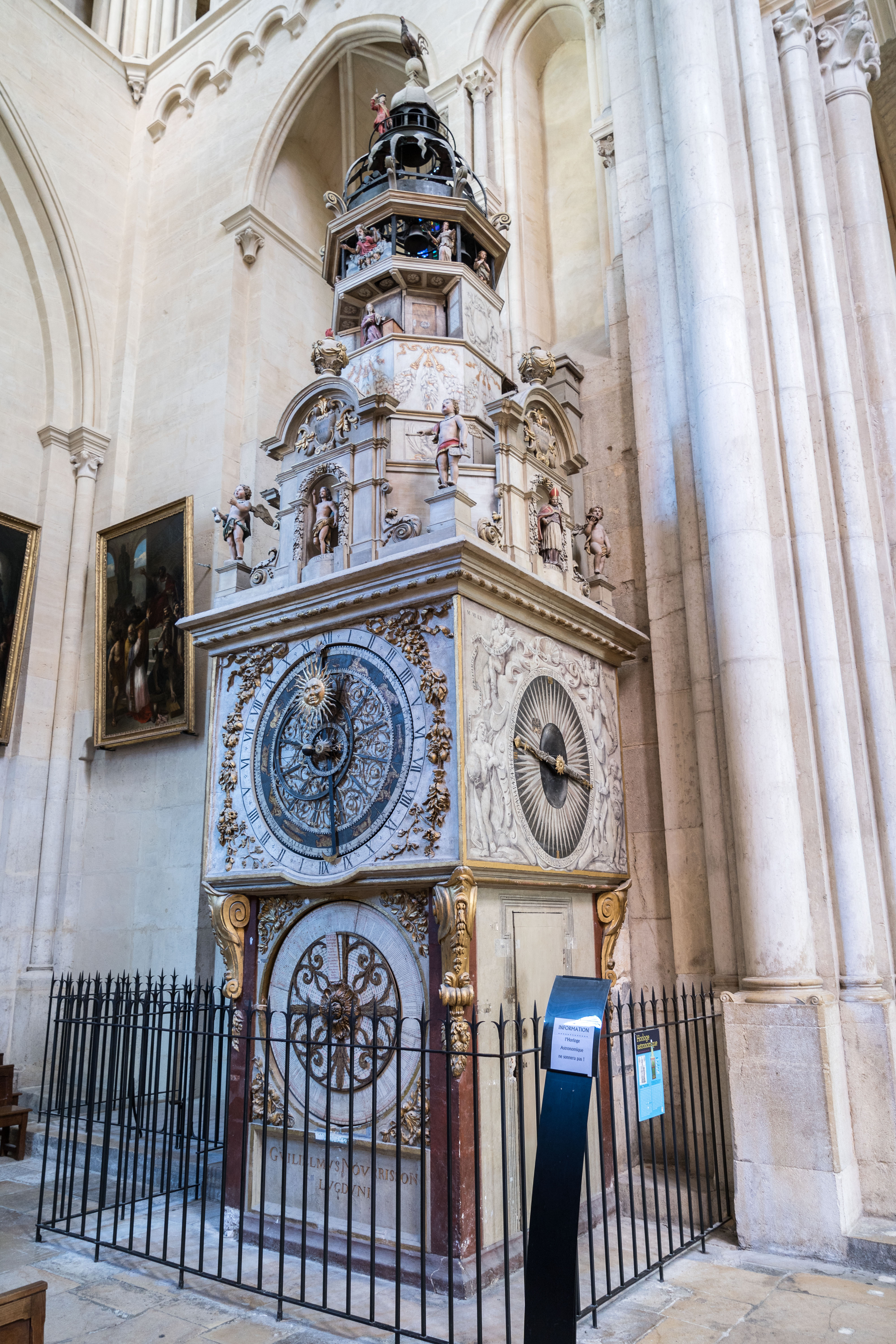
Lyon astronomical clock in Lyon Cathedral

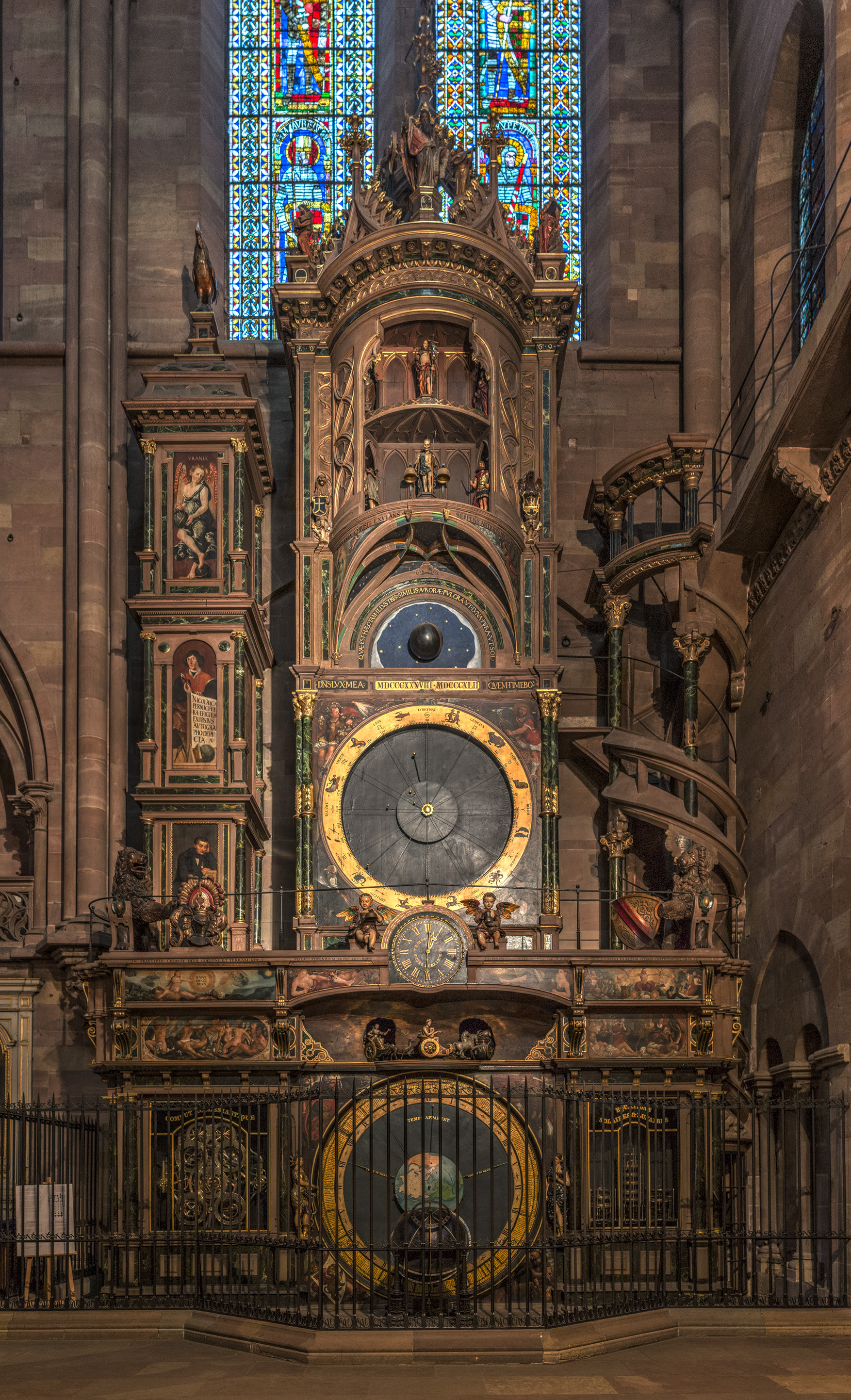
Strasbourg astronomical clock in Strasbourg Cathedral

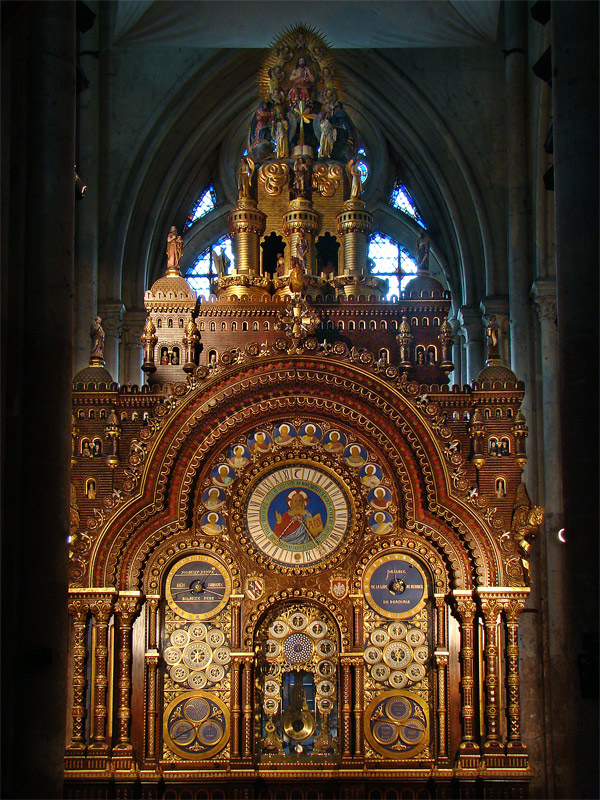
Beauvais astronomical clock in Beauvais Cathedral

=== Georgia ===
- Batumi. The facade of the former National Bank Building on Europe Square has an astronomical clock based on the clock at Mantua, which shows the positions of the sun and moon in the zodiac, and the moon phase.

=== Germany ===
- A group of interior astronomical clocks in churches of Hanseatic League towns in northern Germany, dating from the 14th, 15th and 16th centuries, is known as the Hanseatic clocks (the group also includes the clock at Gdańsk, now in Poland).
  - Bad Doberan. At Doberan Minster, an astrolabe clock was installed by Nikolaus Lilienfeld in 1390. Only the dial survives, now positioned above the west door.
  - Lübeck. The astronomical clock of St. Mary's Church, constructed 1561–1566, was destroyed in the bombing of Lübeck in 1942. The present clock is a replacement by Paul Behrens, installed in 1967.
  - Münster. The Münster astronomical clock of 1540 in Münster Cathedral, adorned with hand-painted zodiac symbols, traces the movement of the planets and plays a glockenspiel tune every noon.
  - Rostock. The Rostock astronomical clock in St. Mary's Church dates from 1472 and was built by Hans Düringer. It shows daily time, the zodiac, moon phases, and the month. With a dedicated electronic database this clock is particularly well documented.
  - Stendal. At St. Mary's Church, an astronomical clock dating from the 1580s was rebuilt in 1856 (and vandalized by the clockmaker), and restored in 1977.
  - Stralsund. The astronomical clock in St. Nicholas' Church is an astrolabe clock installed by Nikolaus Lilienfeld in 1394. It has not been in working order since the 16th century.
  - Tangermünde. At St. Stephen's Church, Tangermünde, an astronomical clock was built in 2023 by Volker Schulz and Thomas Leu.
  - Wismar. The 15th-century astronomical clock in St. Mary's Church was destroyed by bombing in 1945.
- A group of 16th-century clocks on the facade of town halls in southern Germany, which have a 12-hour dial, a moon phase indication, and a calendar dial indicating the positions of the sun and moon in the zodiac, with a dragon hand:
  - Esslingen am Neckar. The Clock of Esslingen Old Town Hall was constructed in 1581–1586.
  - Heilbronn. The Kunstuhr of Heilbronn Town Hall, by Isaac Habrecht, was installed in 1579–1580.
  - Tübingen. The clock of Tübingen Town Hall was installed in 1510.
  - Ulm. The 16th-century astronomical clock of Ulm Town Hall has a 24-hour astrolabe format, although the zodiac is repeated as a rotating ring of gold sculptures, and the outer ring of the dial is a 12-hour chapter ring.
- Cologne. At the Cologne Planetarium, a modern astronomical clock that shows the hour in regular and sidereal time, the moon phase, positions of the sun and moon in the zodiac, and the rotation of the earth according to the geocentric model.
- Esslingen am Neckar. At the headquarters of Festo, Professor Hans Scheurenbrand constructed the Harmonices Mundi (named after Kepler's book of the same name), which consists of an astronomical clock, a world time clock, and a 74 bell glockenspiel.
- Görlitz. Görlitz Town Hall and the Church of St Peter and St Paul both have 16th-century clocks which indicate the lunar phase.
- Munich. The Old Town Hall and the Deutsches Museum both have clocks which indicate the moon phase on a rotating ball, and the zodiac on a fixed ring within a 12-hour dial.
- Schramberg. The Town Hall has an astronomical clock installed in 1913. Its indications are similar to the clock of Ulm (except that the outer hour ring is 24-hour), with an offset astrolabe ring repeated as a golden zodiac ring.
- Stuttgart. A modern clock in the tower of Stuttgart Town Hall shows the moon phase and the day of the week.
- Worms. The clock tower Worms Town Hall has a modern calendar dial that shows the month, the positions of the sun and moon in the zodiac, the moon phase, and has a dragon hand.
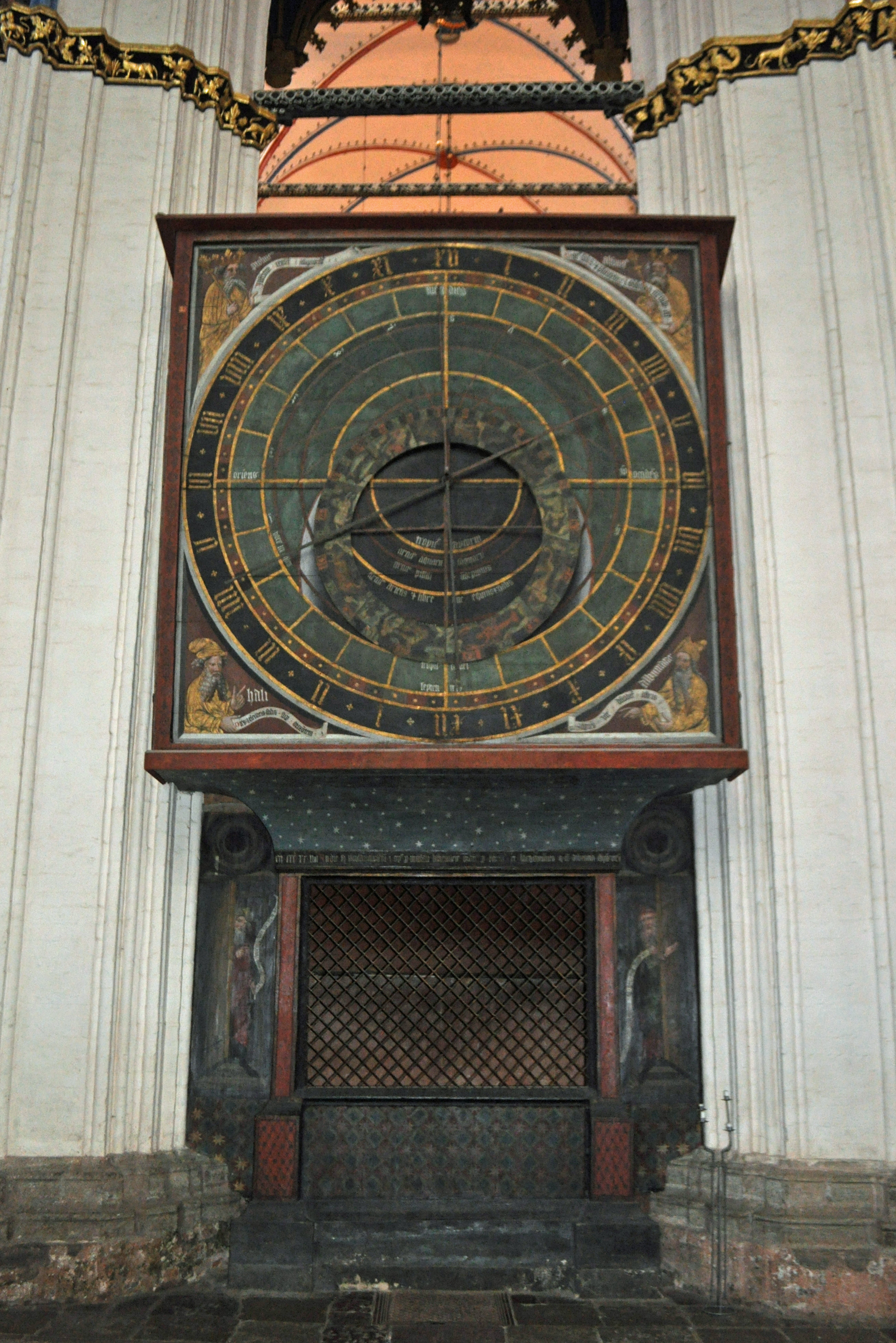
St. Nicholas' Church, Stralsund

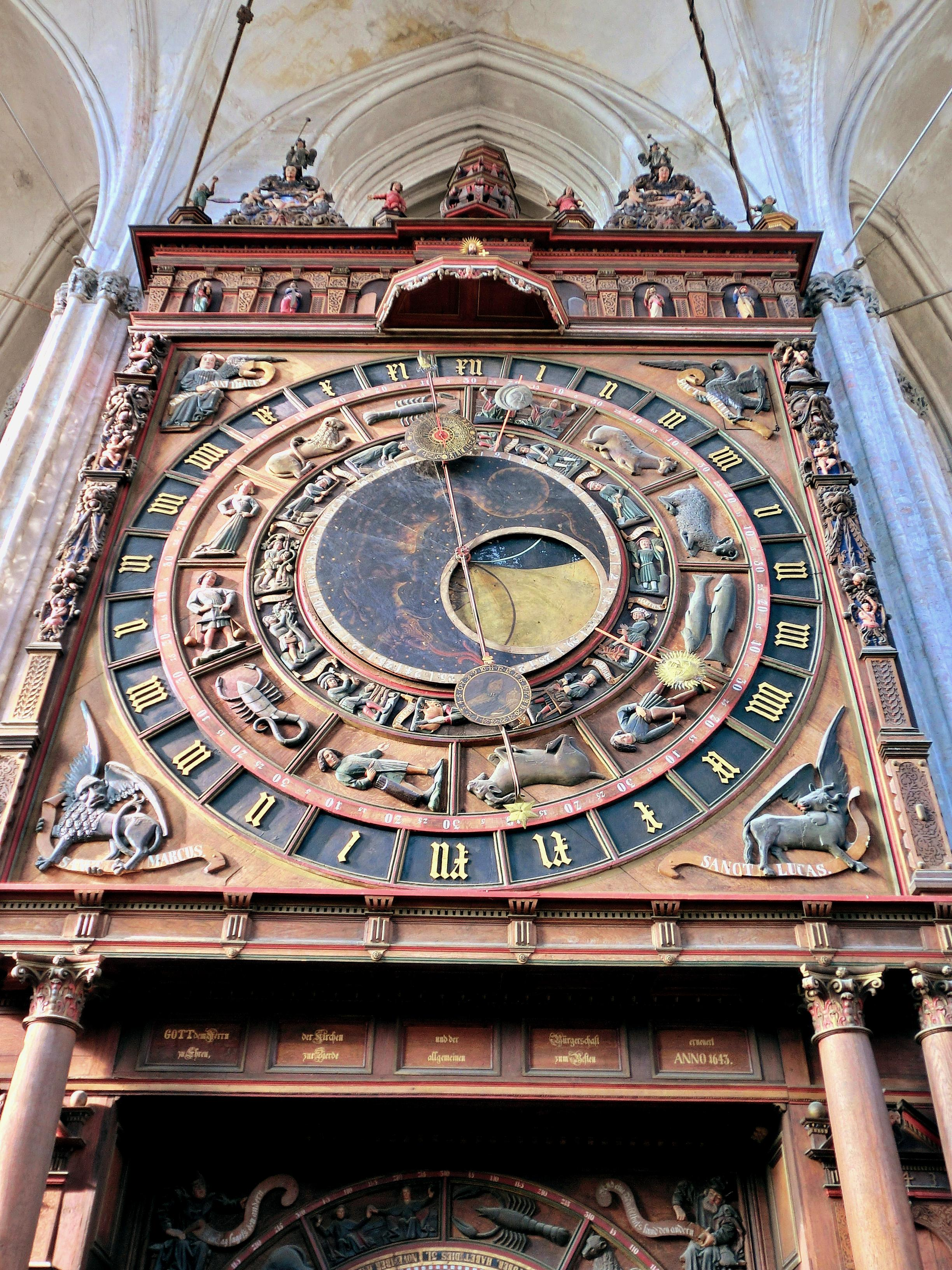
St. Mary's Church, Rostock

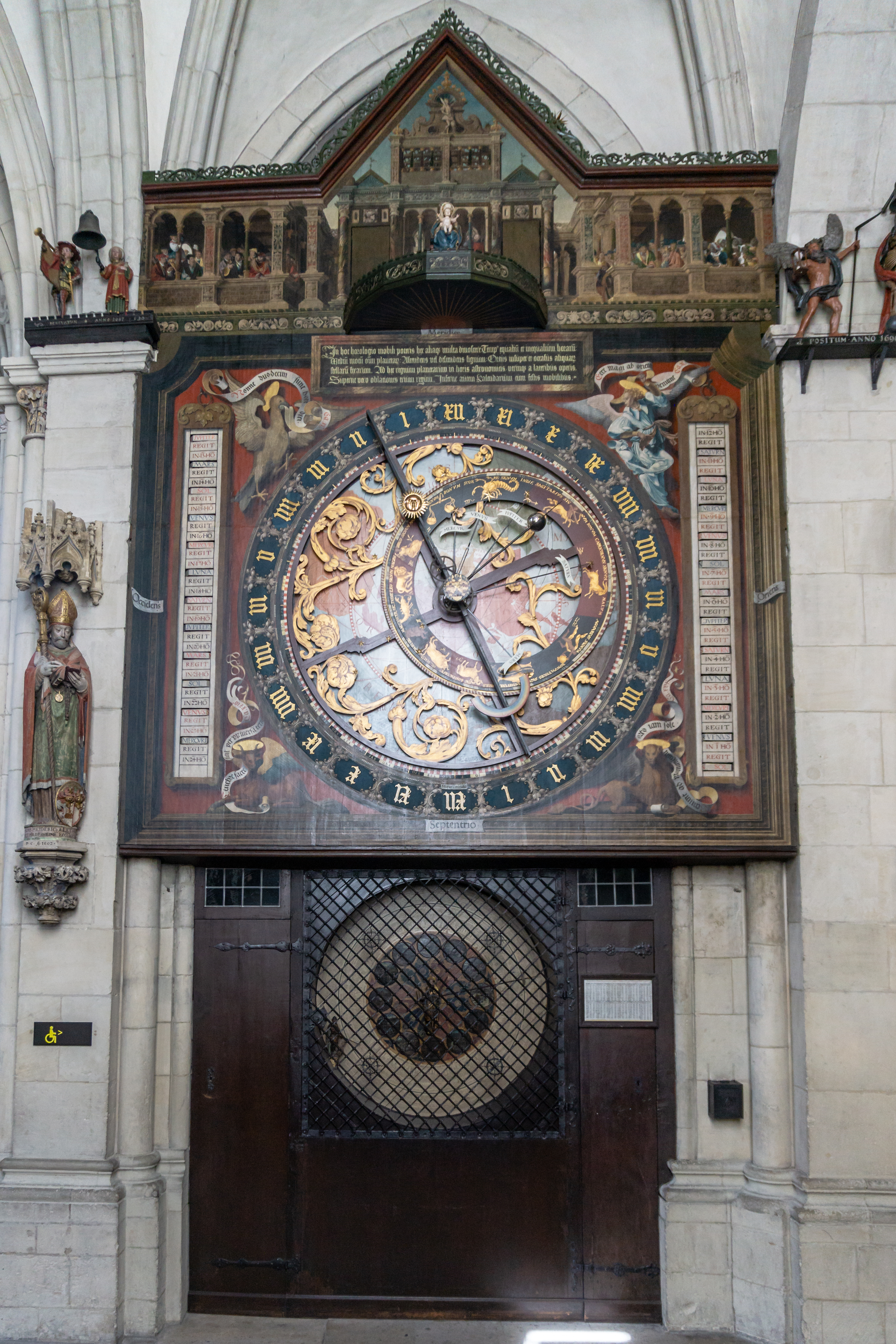
Münster Cathedral

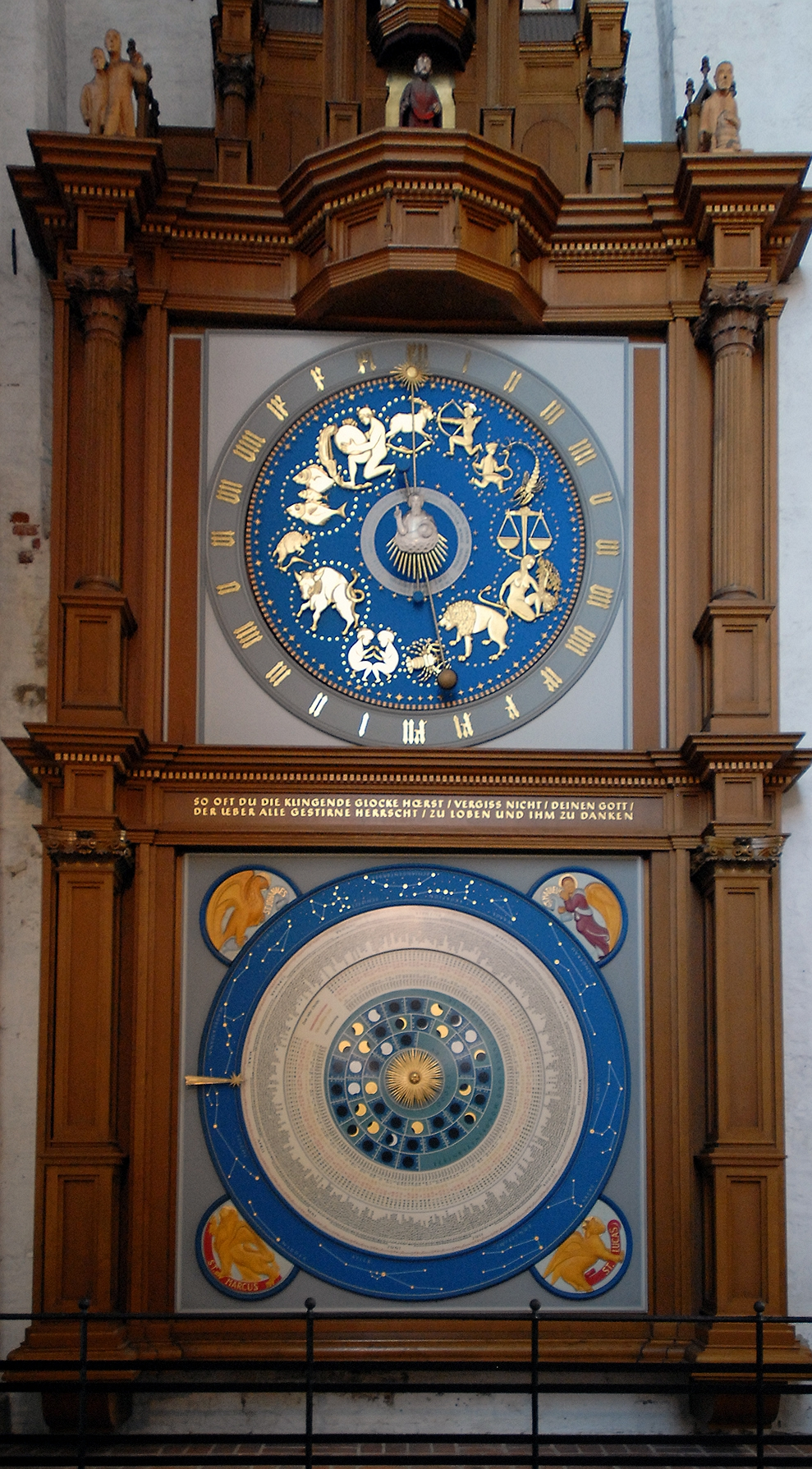
St. Mary's Church, Lübeck

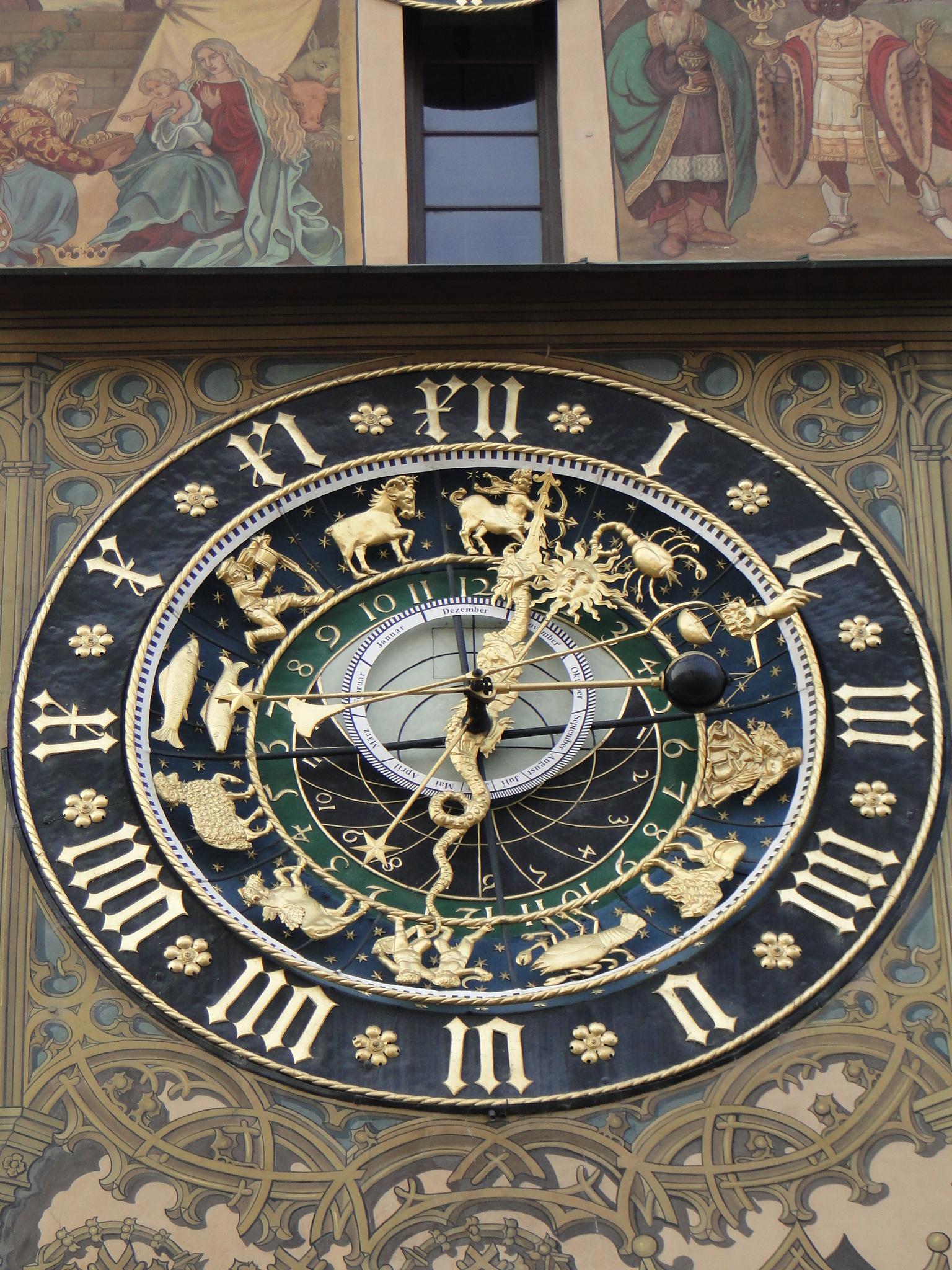
Ulm

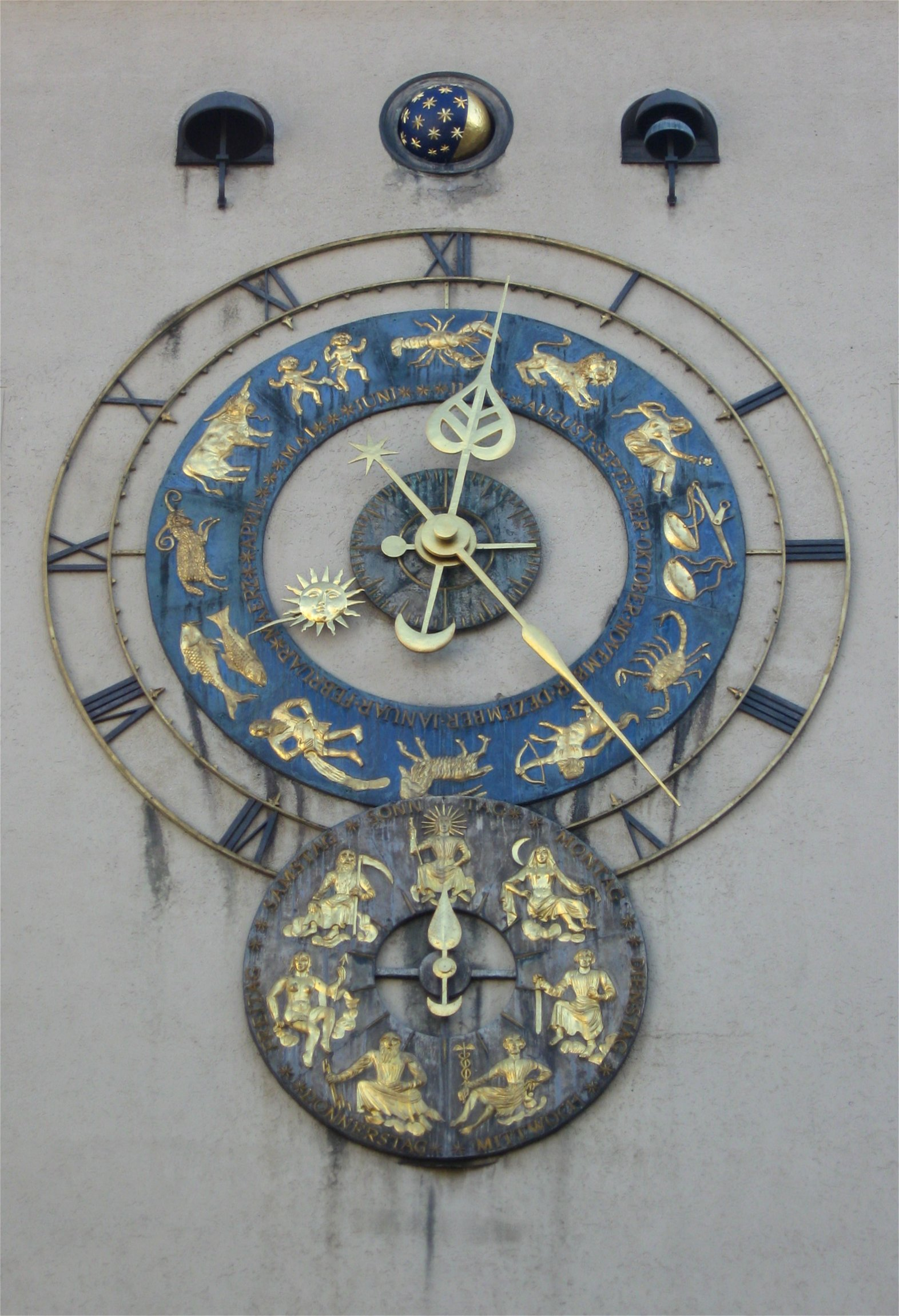
Deutsches Museum, Munich

=== Hungary ===
- Székesfehérvár. A modern astronomical clock with automata and a carillon is at the Clock Museum.
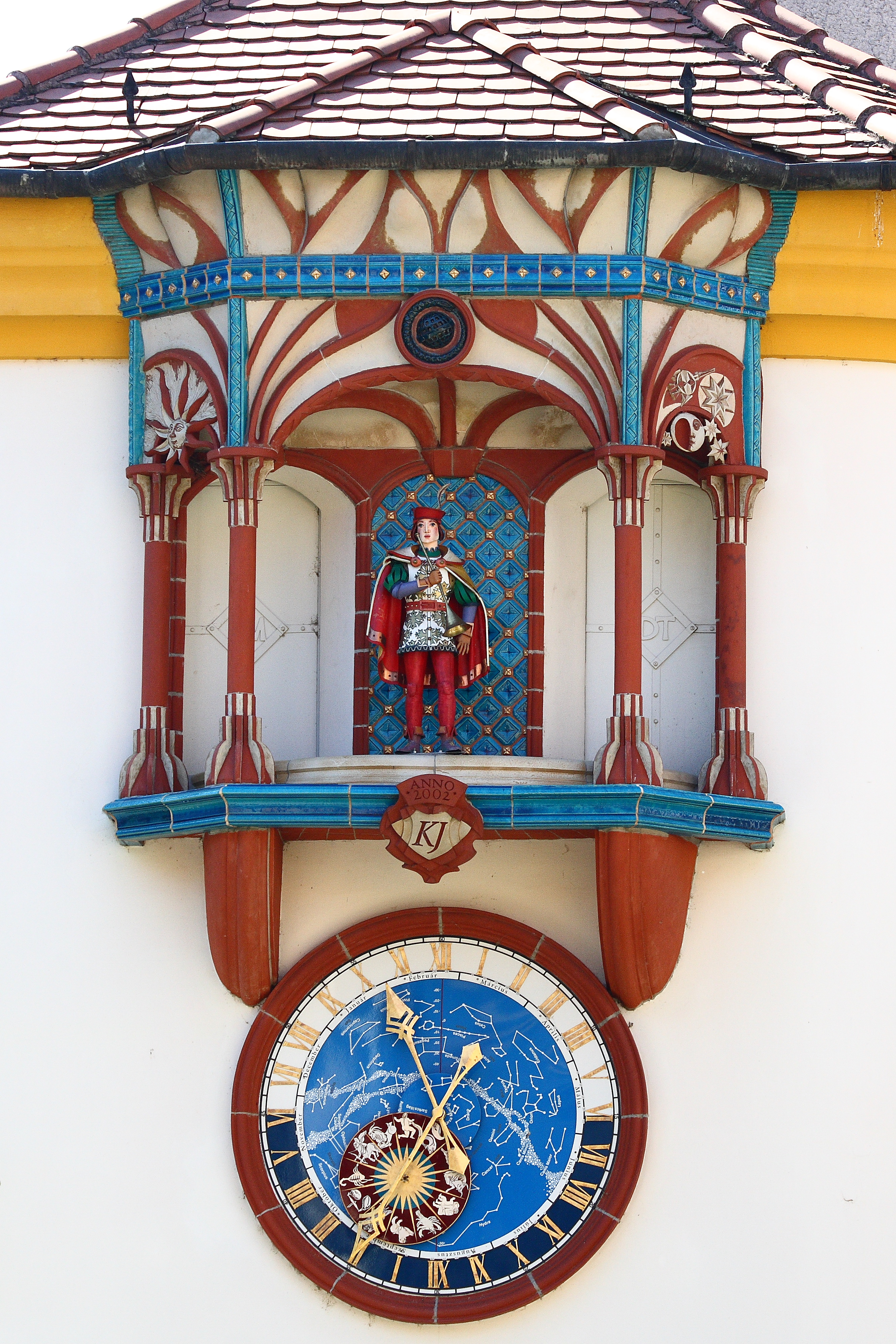
Astronomical clock in Székesfehérvár

=== Italy ===
- Arezzo. The clock of the Palazzo della Fraternita dei Laici, installed in 1552, shows the moon phase and age.
- Bassano del Grappa. A 24-hour dial with zodiac indication is on the Palazzo del Municipio. It was first installed in 1430 and reconstructed by Bartolomeo Ferracina in 1747.
- Brescia. An astronomical clock dated c. 1540–1550 is in the Torre dell'Orologio.
- Clusone. Fanzago's astronomical clock at the Palazzo Comunale was built by Pietro Fanzago in 1583.
- Cremona. The 16th-century astronomical clock of the Torrazzo, the bell tower of Cremona Cathedral, is the largest medieval clock in Europe.
- Macerata. An astronomical clock is installed in the Torre Civica. It is a modern replica of the original clock of 1571, which shows the orbits of the planets.
- Mantua. An astronomical clock was installed in 1473 in the Torre dell'Orologio of the Palazzo della Ragione.
- Merano. The clock tower at the entrance to Merano town cemetery was installed in 1908 by Philipp Hörz of Ulm, with a calendar dial showing the month, zodiac, and moon phase.
- Messina. The Messina astronomical clock is in the tower of Messina Cathedral. It is a multi-dial clock equipped with complex automata, constructed between 1930 and 1933 by the Ungerer Company of Strasbourg. It is among the largest astronomical clocks in the world.
- Padua. A 15th-century astronomical clock is in the Torre dell'Orologio.
- Rimini. The clock tower on Piazza Tre Martiri has a calendar dial installed in 1750 showing the date, zodiac, and moon phase and age.
- Soncino. A 24-hour dial with zodiac indication is in the town hall. The terracotta zodiac dial dates from 1977.
- Trapani. An astronomical clock of 1596 is in the Porta Oscura, with a dial for the hours and the zodiac, and a lunar dial.
- Venice. St Mark's Clock, in the clocktower on St Mark's Square, was built and installed by Gian Paulo and Gian Carlo Rainieri, father and son, between 1496 and 1499.
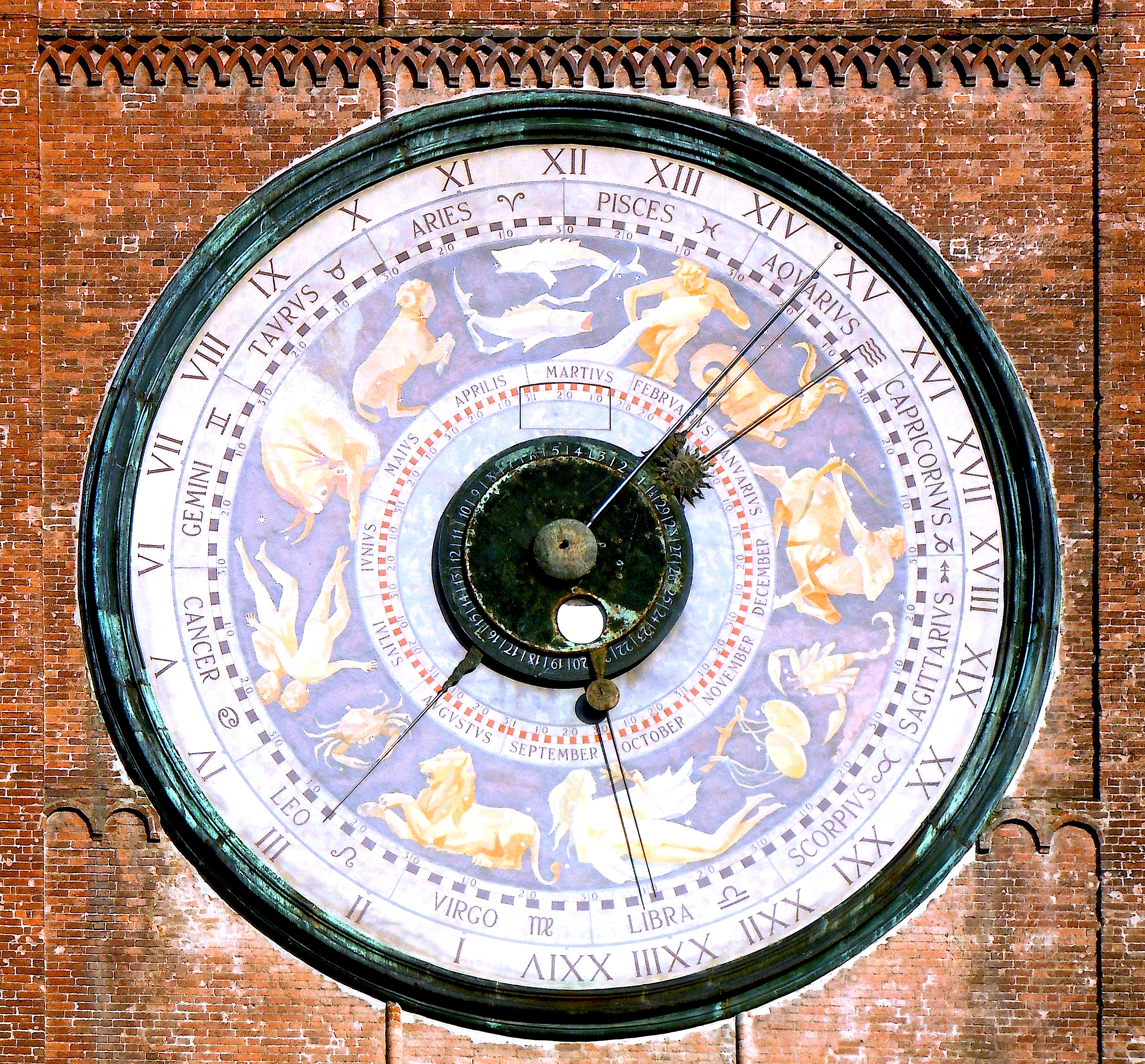
Cremona

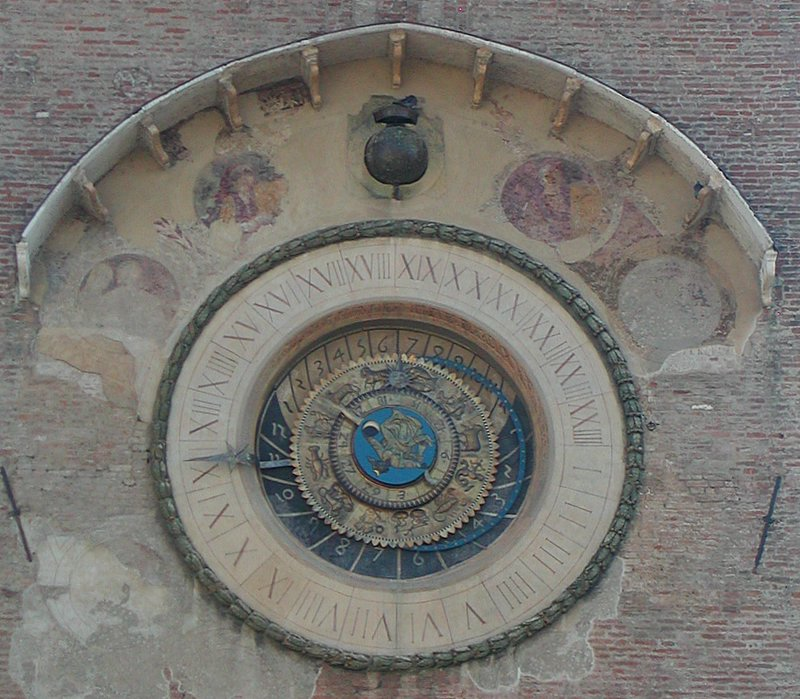
Mantua

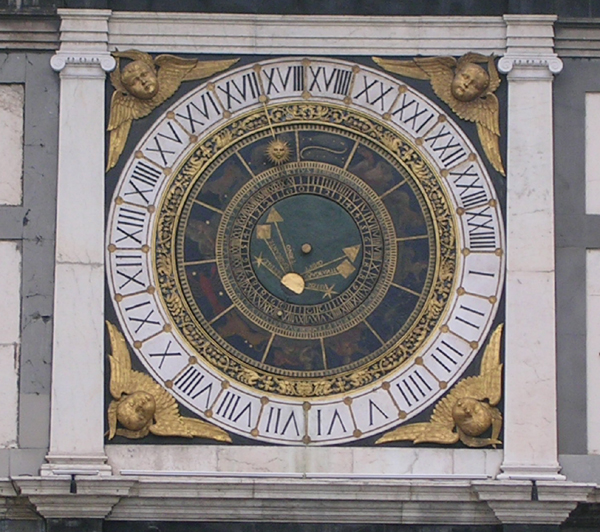
Brescia

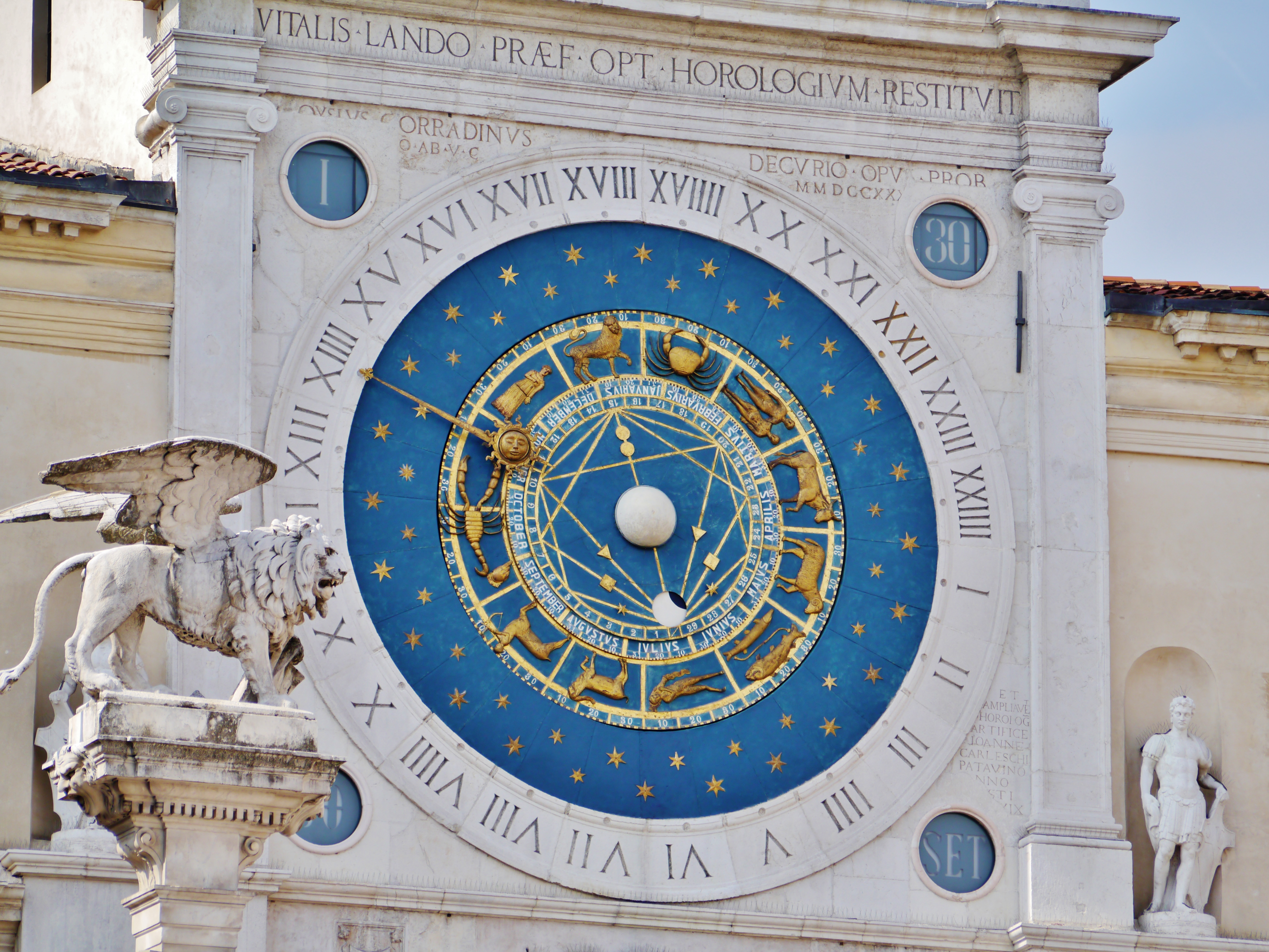
Padua

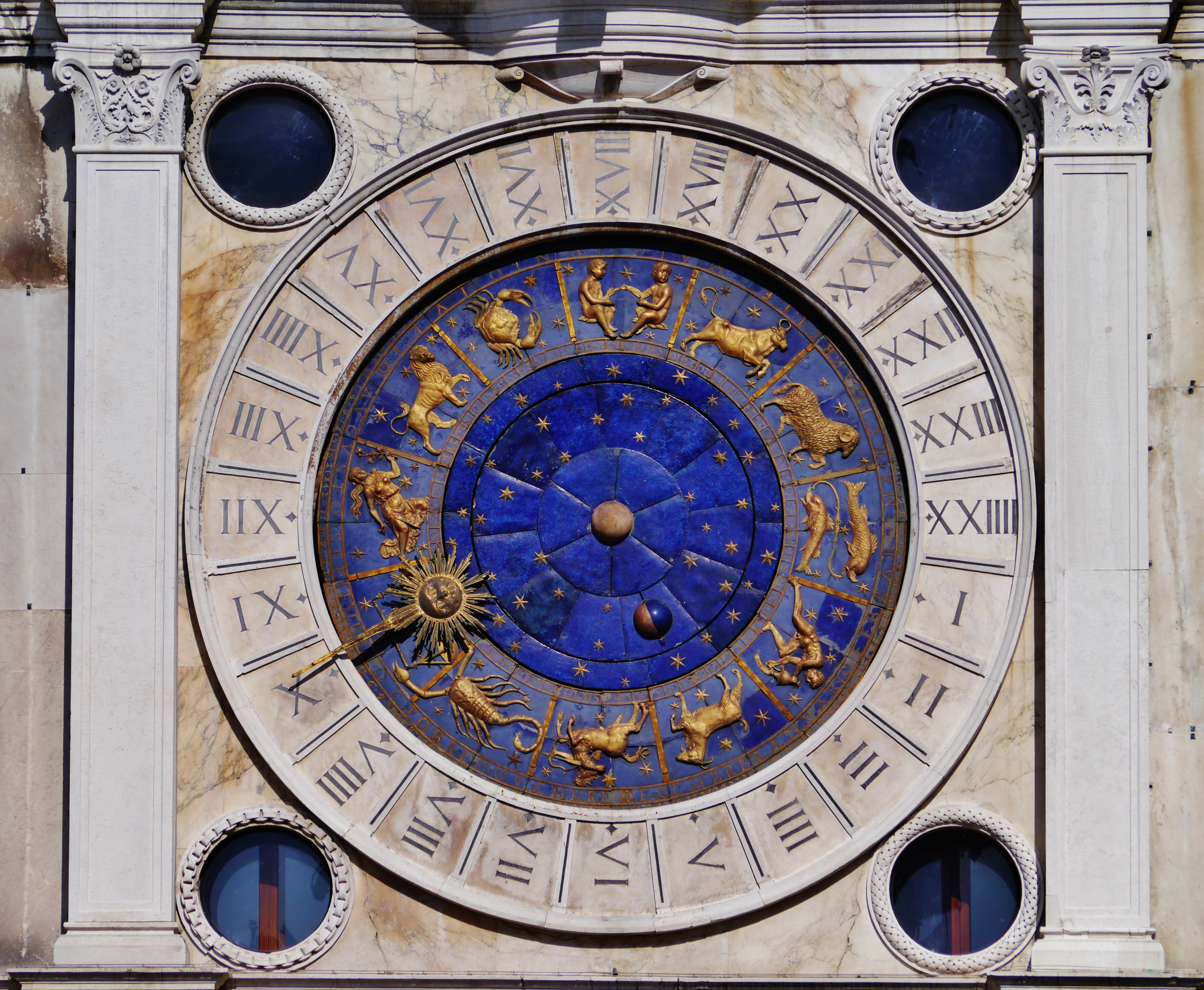
Venice

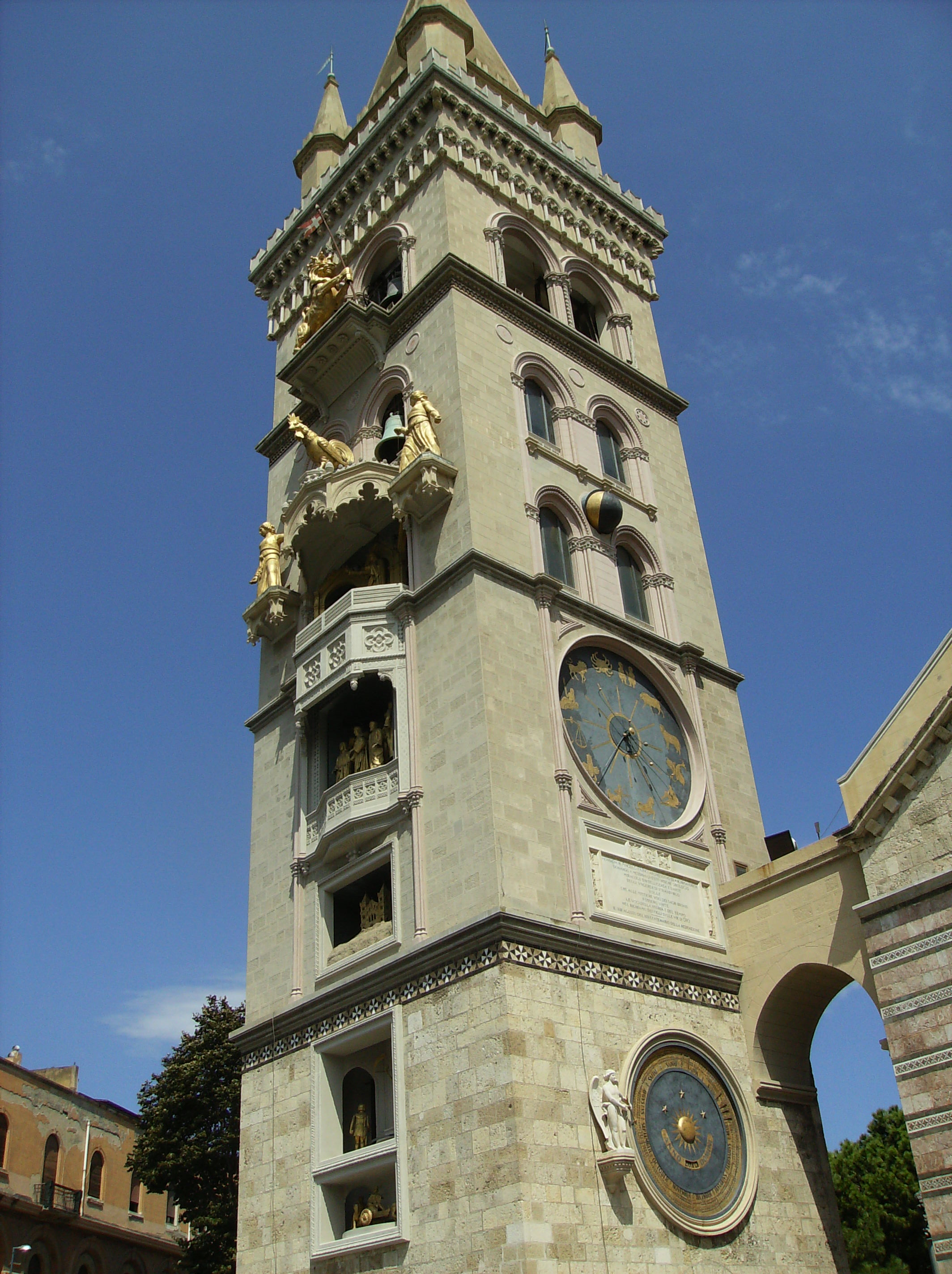
Messina

=== Japan ===
- Tokyo: The Shinjuku I-Land clock tower features a clock face that is an exact replica of Prague's astronomical clock. On the other side of the tower is a more conventional analog clock face featuring a rotating planisphere disc that shows the current constellations seen in the night sky over Japan.

=== Latvia ===
- Riga: The clock on the facade of the House of the Blackheads shows the time, date, month, day of the week, and lunar phase.
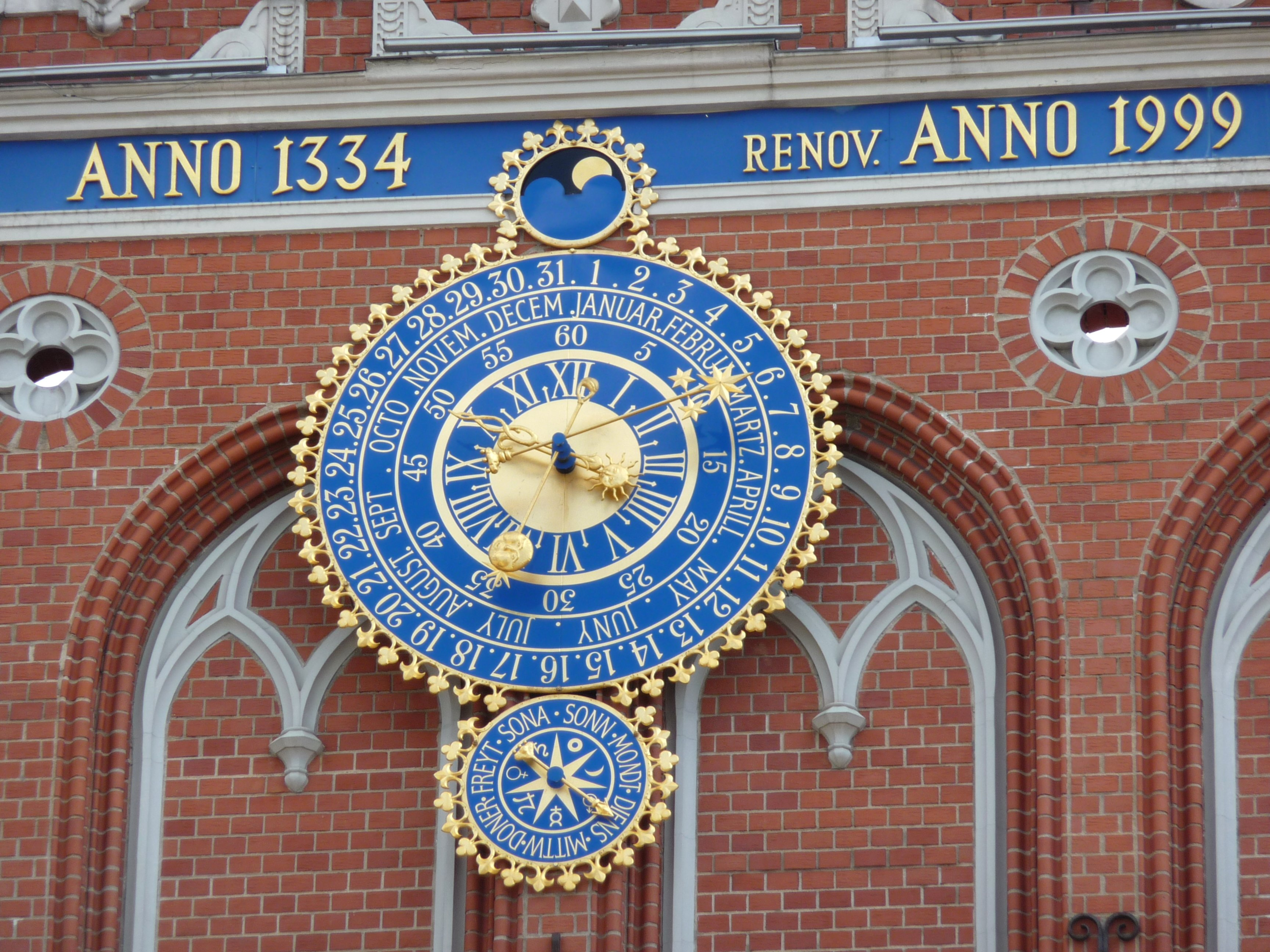
Rebuilt clock on the House of the Blackheads (Riga)

=== Malta ===
- Valletta. The clock of the Grandmaster's Palace, installed in 1745, shows the hour, date, month, and lunar phase, and has bells struck by four jacquemarts.
- Malta has several church clocks that show calendar indications on separate dials, including those of St John's Co-Cathedral, Valletta; St Paul's Cathedral, Mdina; the Rotunda of Mosta; and the Church of St Bartholomew, Għargħur.
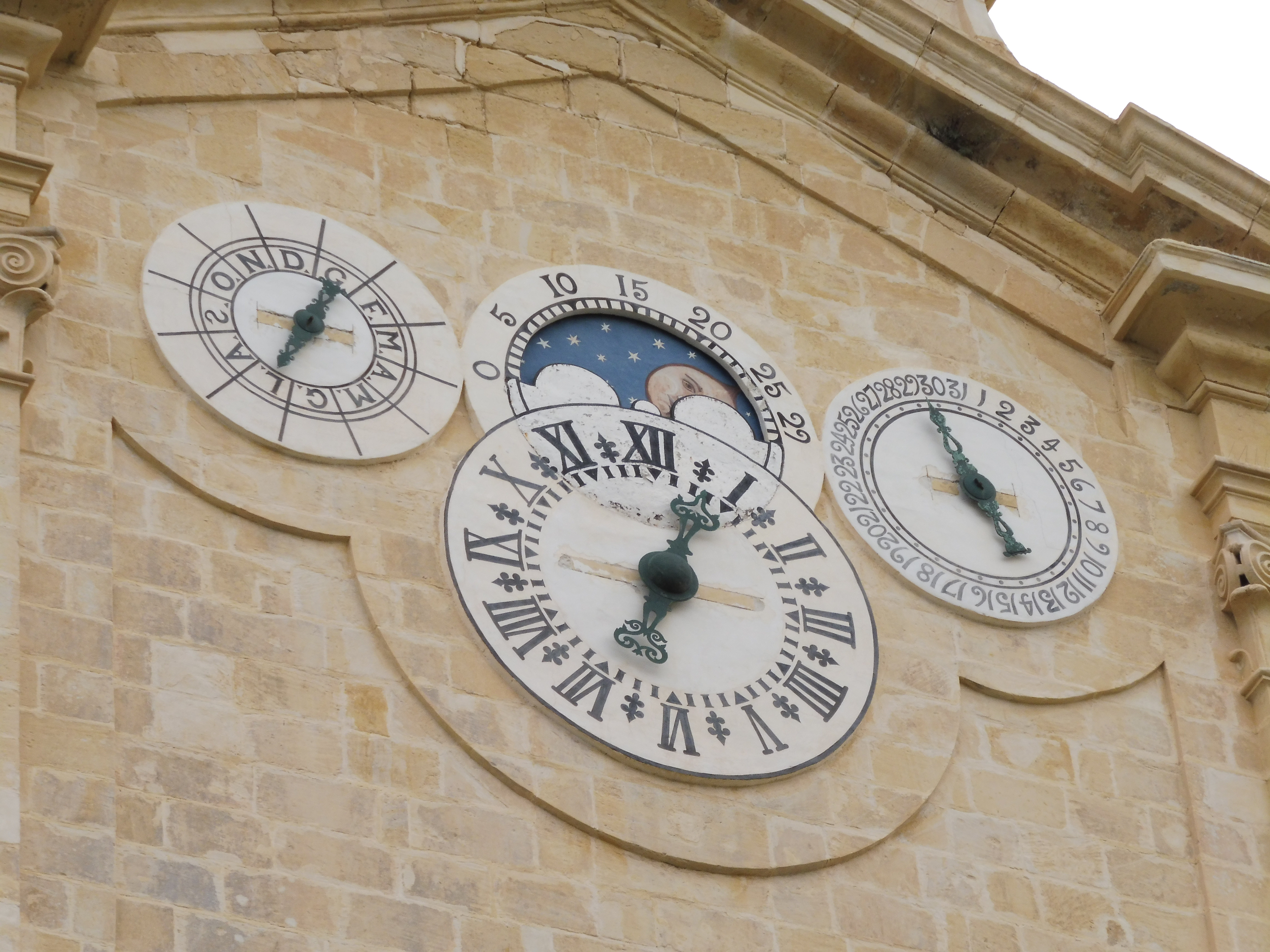
Grandmaster's Palace, Valletta

=== Netherlands ===
- Arnemuiden. The 16th-century church clock at Arnemuiden indicates the lunar phase and the time of high tide.
- Franeker. The Eise Eisinga Planetarium, built 1774–1781, is an orrery and astronomical clock which shows the movements of the solar system.
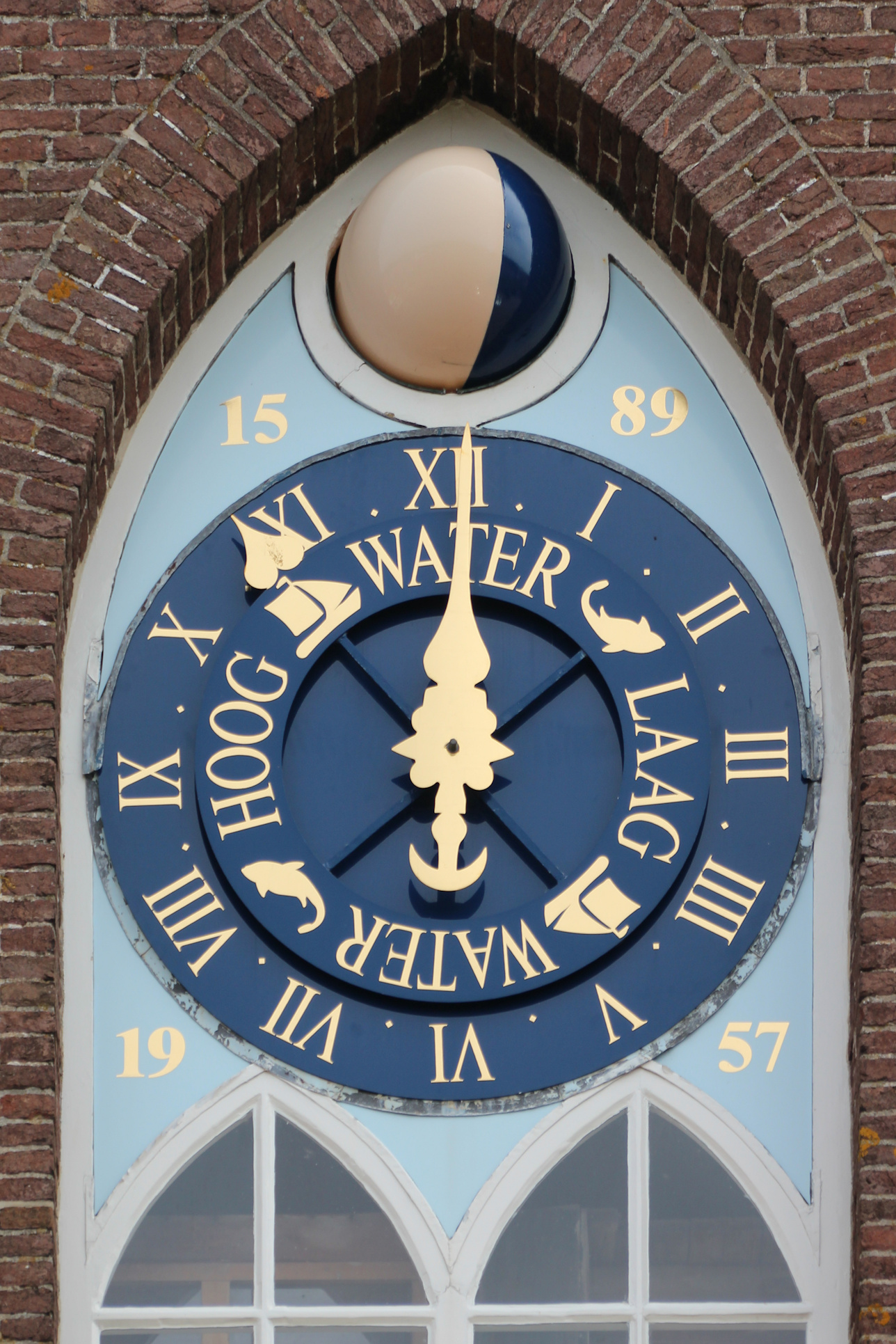
Arnemuiden clock showing high and low water
(hoog and laag)

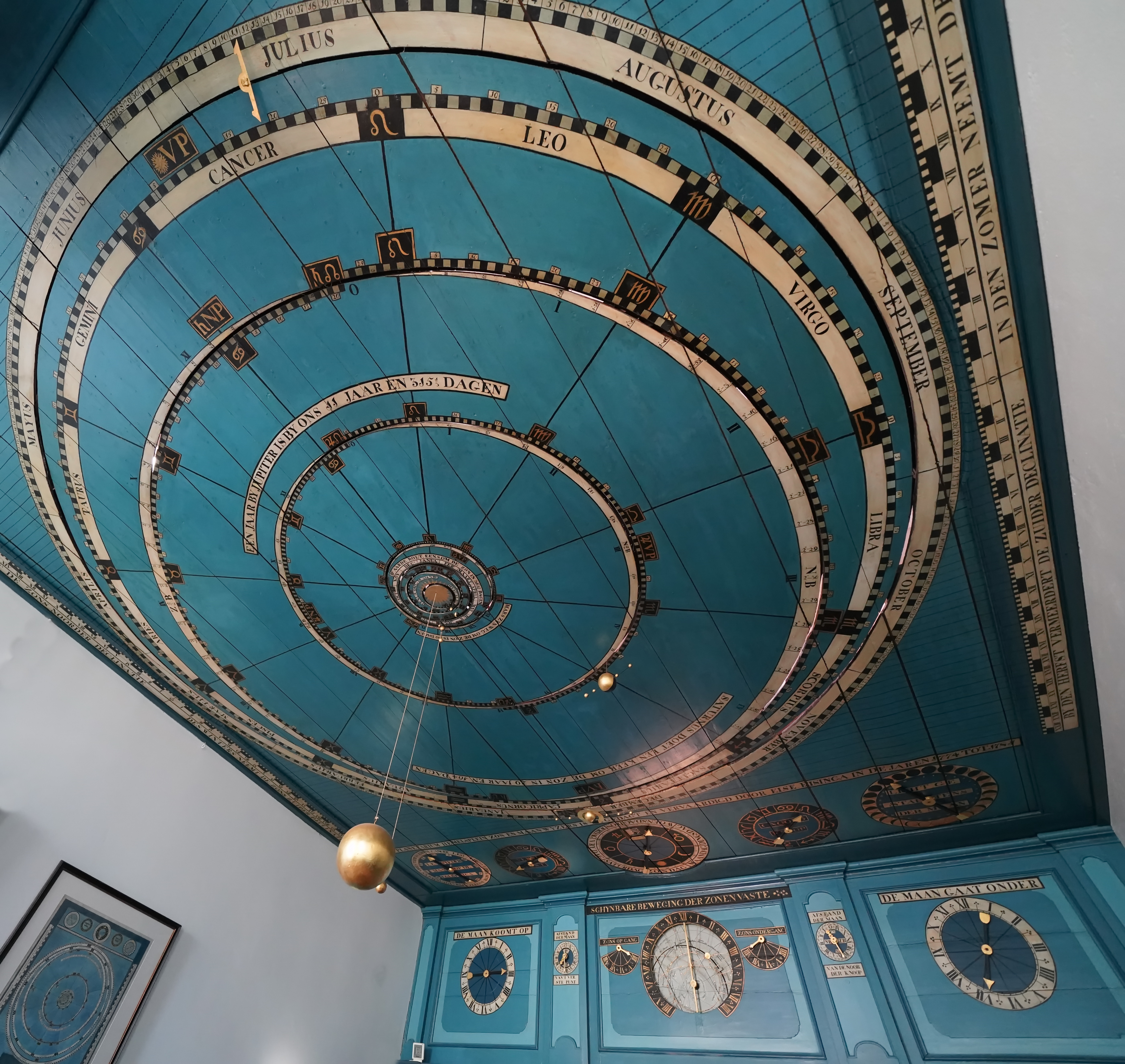
The Eise Eisinga Planetarium in Franeker

=== Norway ===
- Oslo. A 20th-century astronomical clock is at Oslo City Hall.
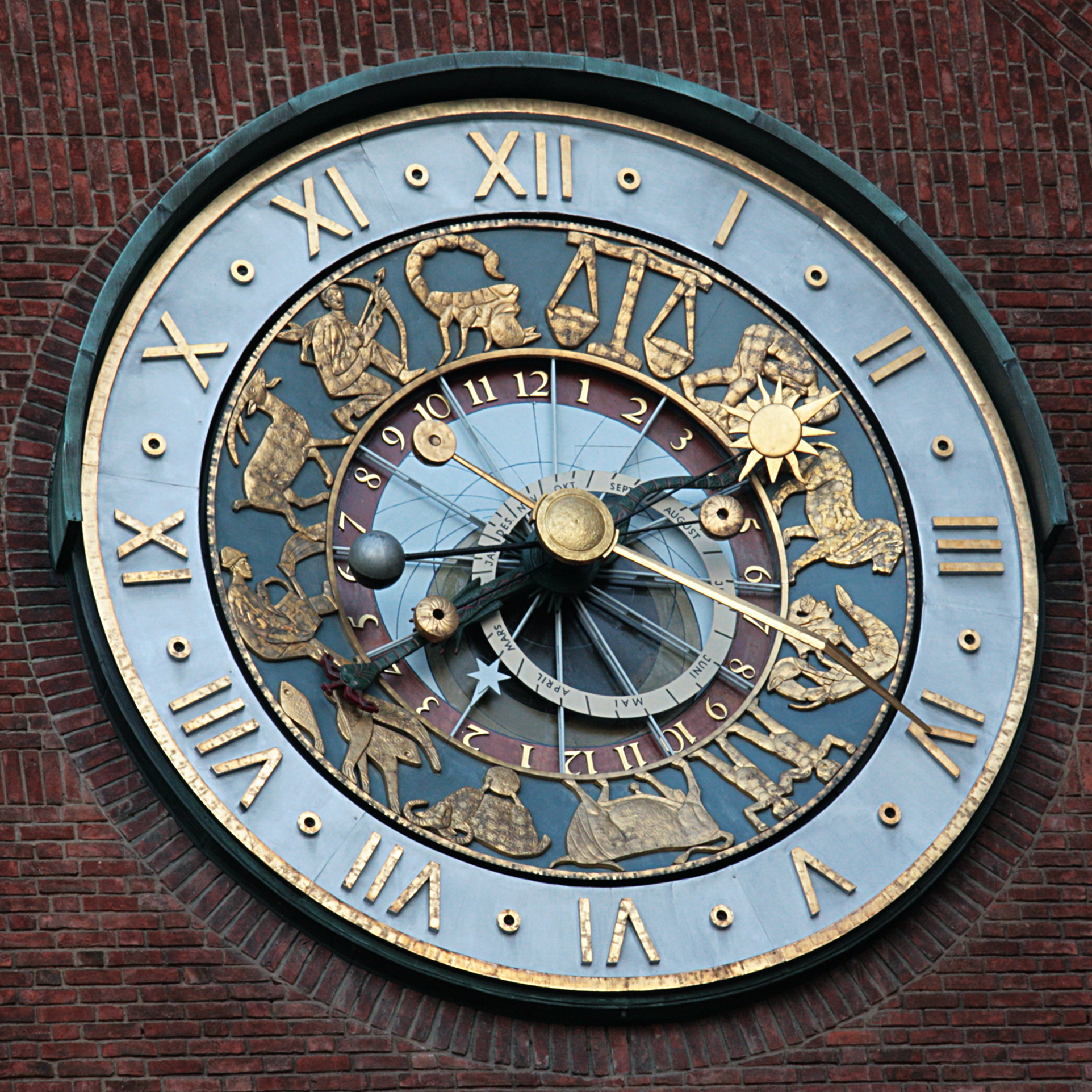
Oslo City Hall

=== Poland ===
- Gdańsk. The Gdańsk astronomical clock in St. Mary's Church dates from 1464 to 1470, and was built by Hans Düringer of Toruń. It was reconstructed after 1945.
- Wrocław. A 16th-century clock showing the moon phase is at Wrocław Town Hall.
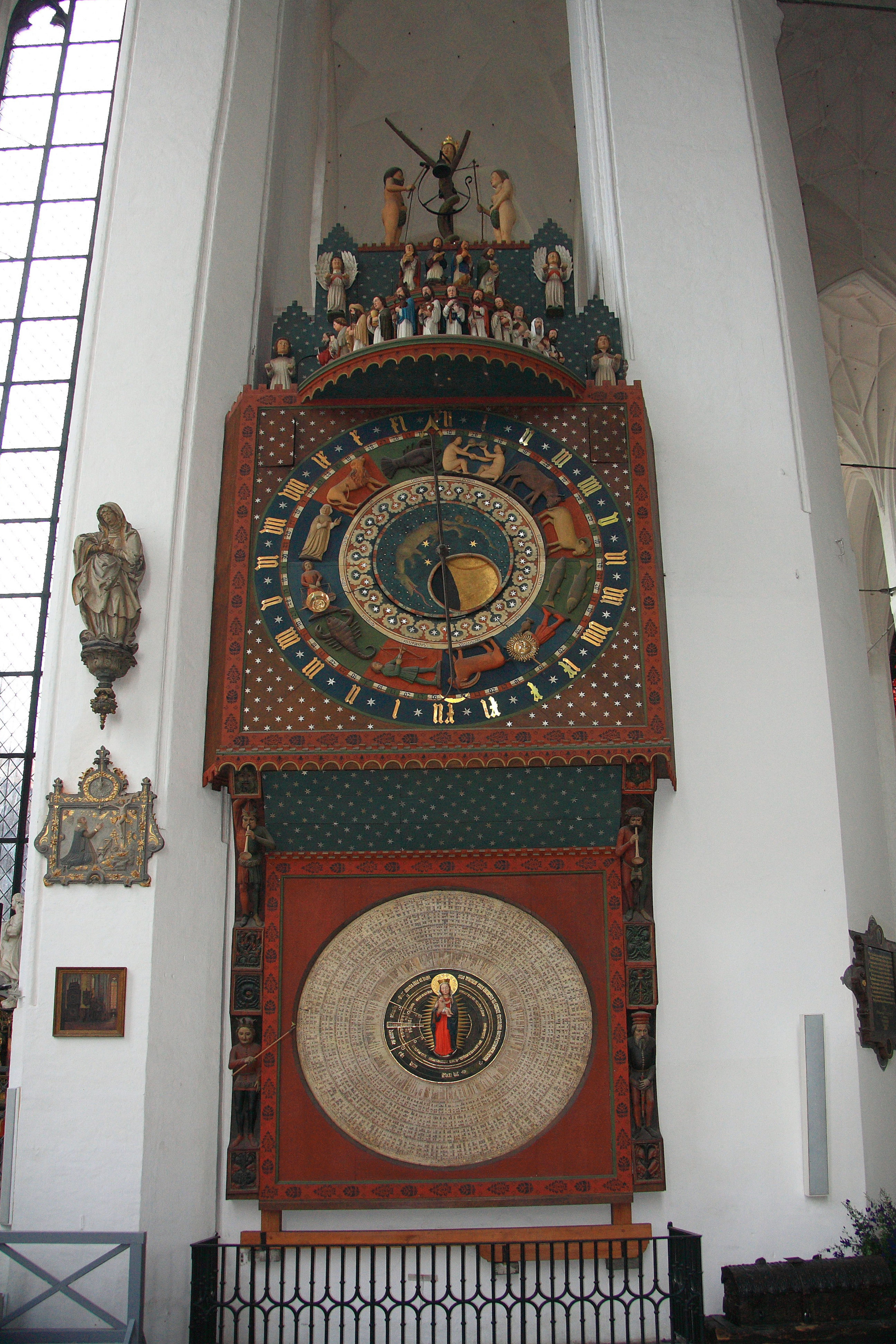
Gdańsk

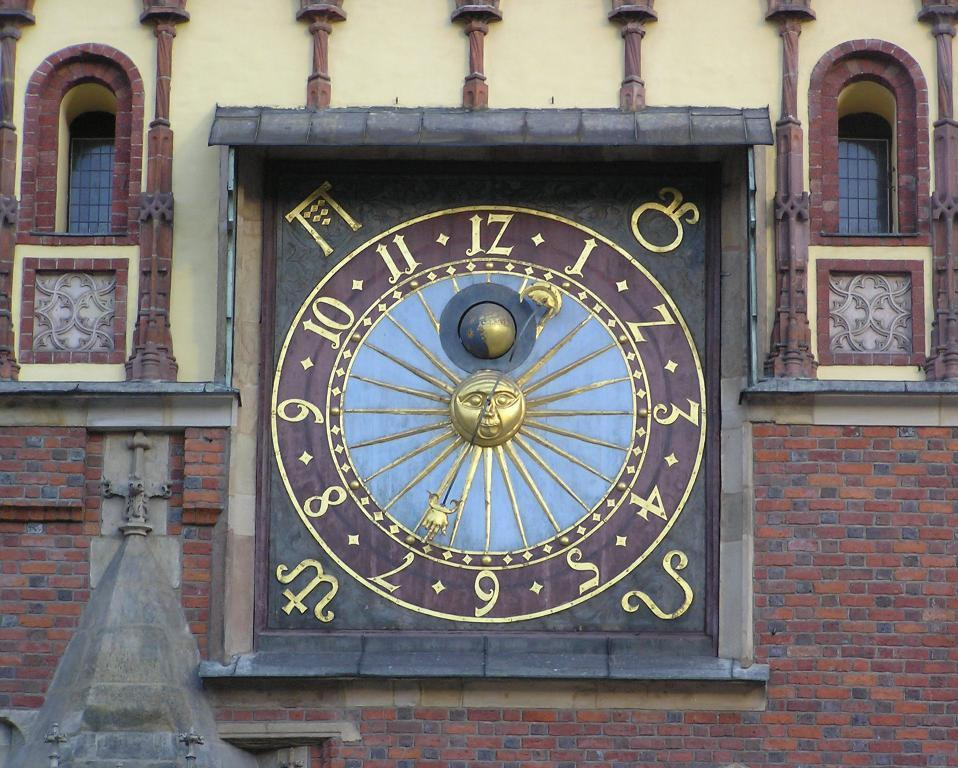
Wrocław Town Hall

=== Slovakia ===
- Stará Bystrica: An astronomical clock in the stylized shape of Our Lady of Sorrows was built in the town square in 2009. The astronomical part of the clock consists of an astrolabe displaying the astrological signs, positions of the Sun and Moon, and the lunar phases. Its statues and automata depict Slovak historical and religious figures. The clock is controlled by computer using DCF77 signals.
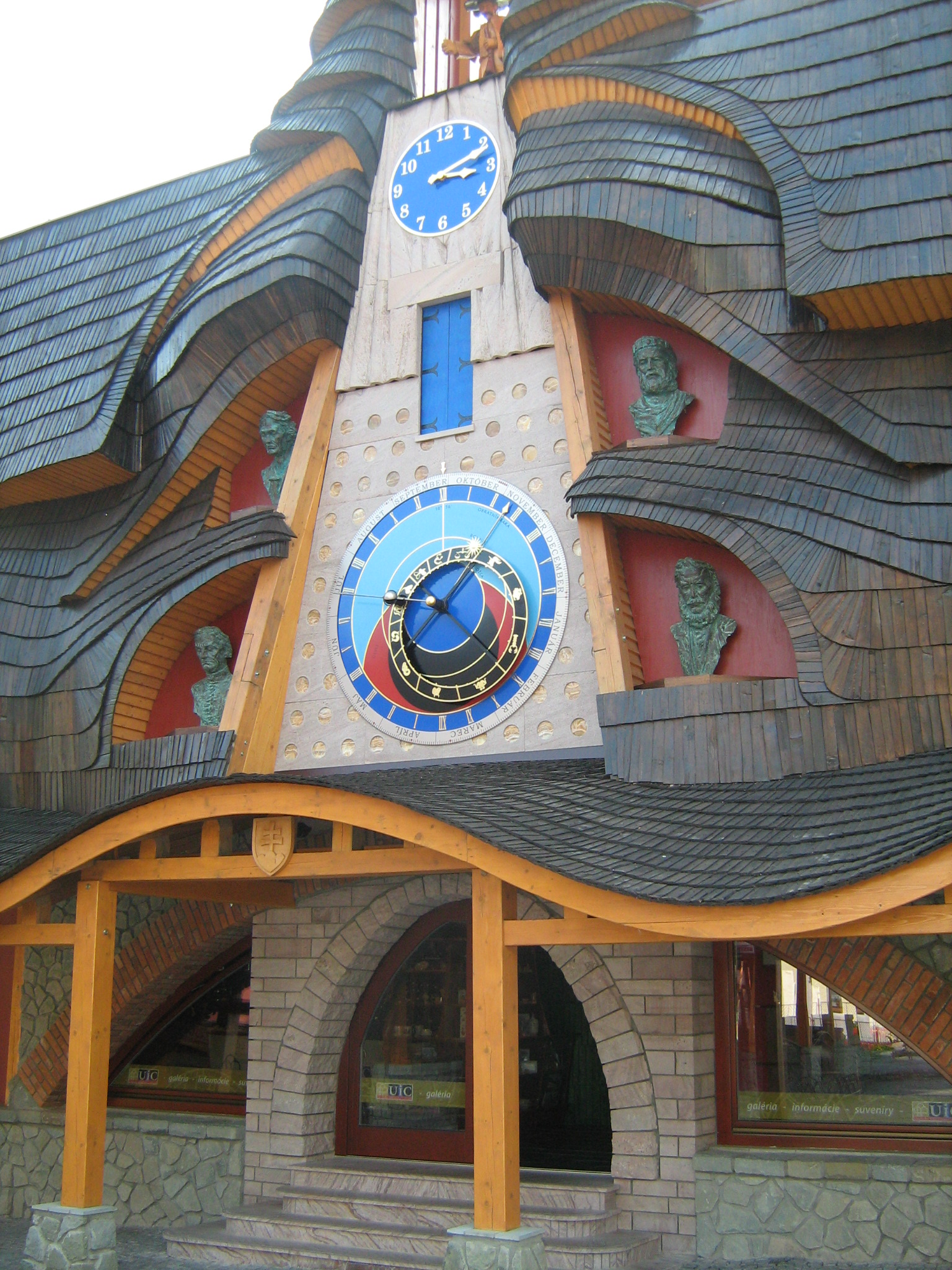
Stará Bystrica

=== South Korea ===
- Honcheonsigye is an astronomical clock made by Song Yi-Yeong (송이영; 宋以潁), a professor of Gwansanggam (관상감; 觀象監) (a scientific institution of the Joseon dynasty) in 1669. It was designated as South Korean national treasure number 230 on 9 August 1985. The clock used the alarm clock technology created by Christiaan Huygens in 1657. The clock shows that Huygens' technology had spread to East Asia within 12 years. It also demonstrates the astronomy and mechanical engineering technology of the Joseon dynasty. Korea has been making armillary sphere since the 15th century as part of King Sejong's technology development policy, and this clock is an important historical document that shows the fusion of East Asian astronomy and European mechanical technology.

=== Spain ===
- Astorga: The interior face of the clock of Astorga Cathedral has a 24-hour dial which shows the lunar phase and the date.

=== Sweden ===
- Lund: The Lund astronomical clock in Lund Cathedral in Sweden (Horologium mirabile Lundense) was made around 1425, probably by the clockmaker Nicolaus Lilienveld in Rostock. After it had been in storage since 1837, it was restored and put back in place in 1923. Only the upper, astronomical part is original, while some of the other remaining medieval parts can be seen at the Cathedral museum. When it plays, In Dulci Jubilo is heard from the smallest organ in the church, while seven wooden figures representing the three magi and their servants pass by.
- Fjelie: Emil Ahrent, the local priest, constructed and donated an astronomical clock to Fjelie Church in 1946.
- Nottebäck: K.L. Lundén, the local priest, installed an astronomical clock in Nottebäck Church in 1954.
- Rinkaby: An astronomical clock was installed in Rinkaby Church in the 1950s. Modelled on medieval clocks, it was made by a local electrician.
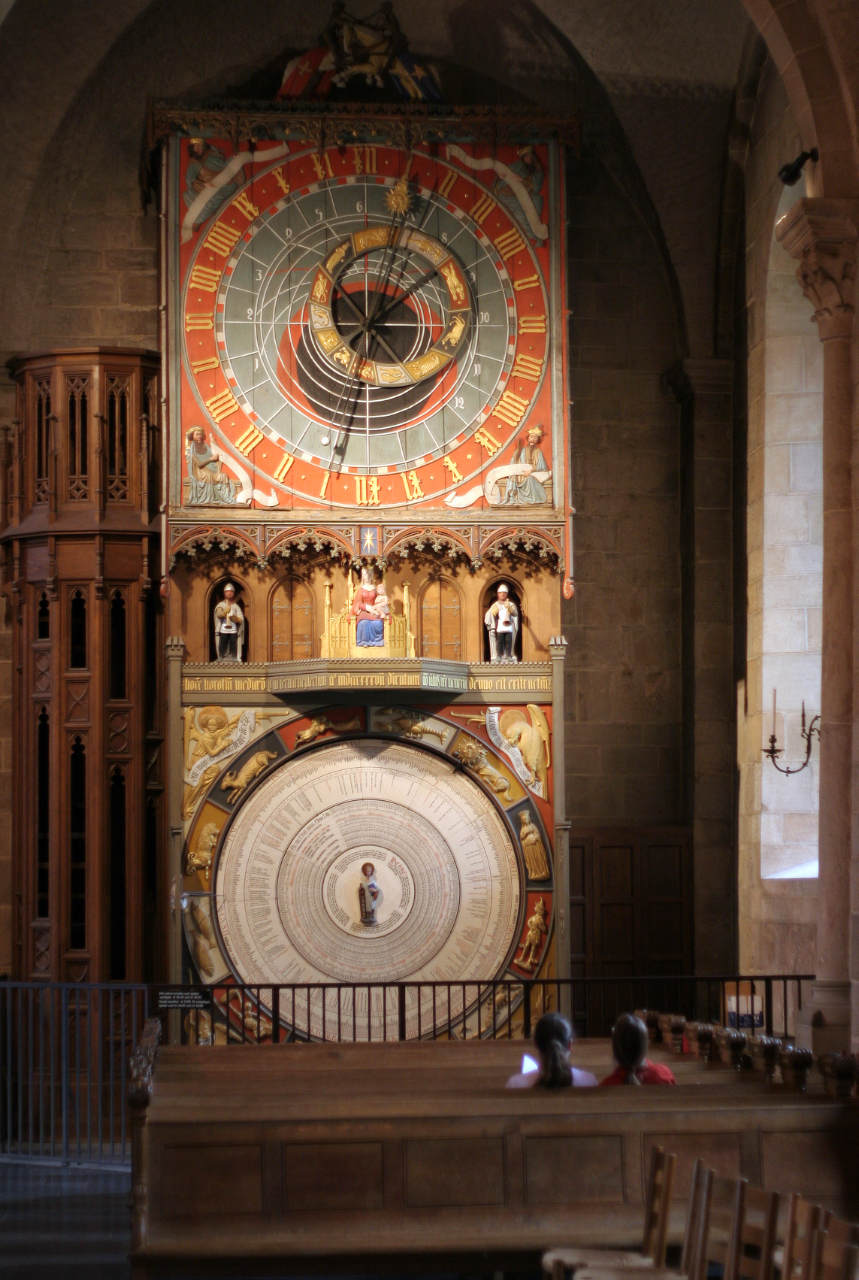
Lund astronomical clock

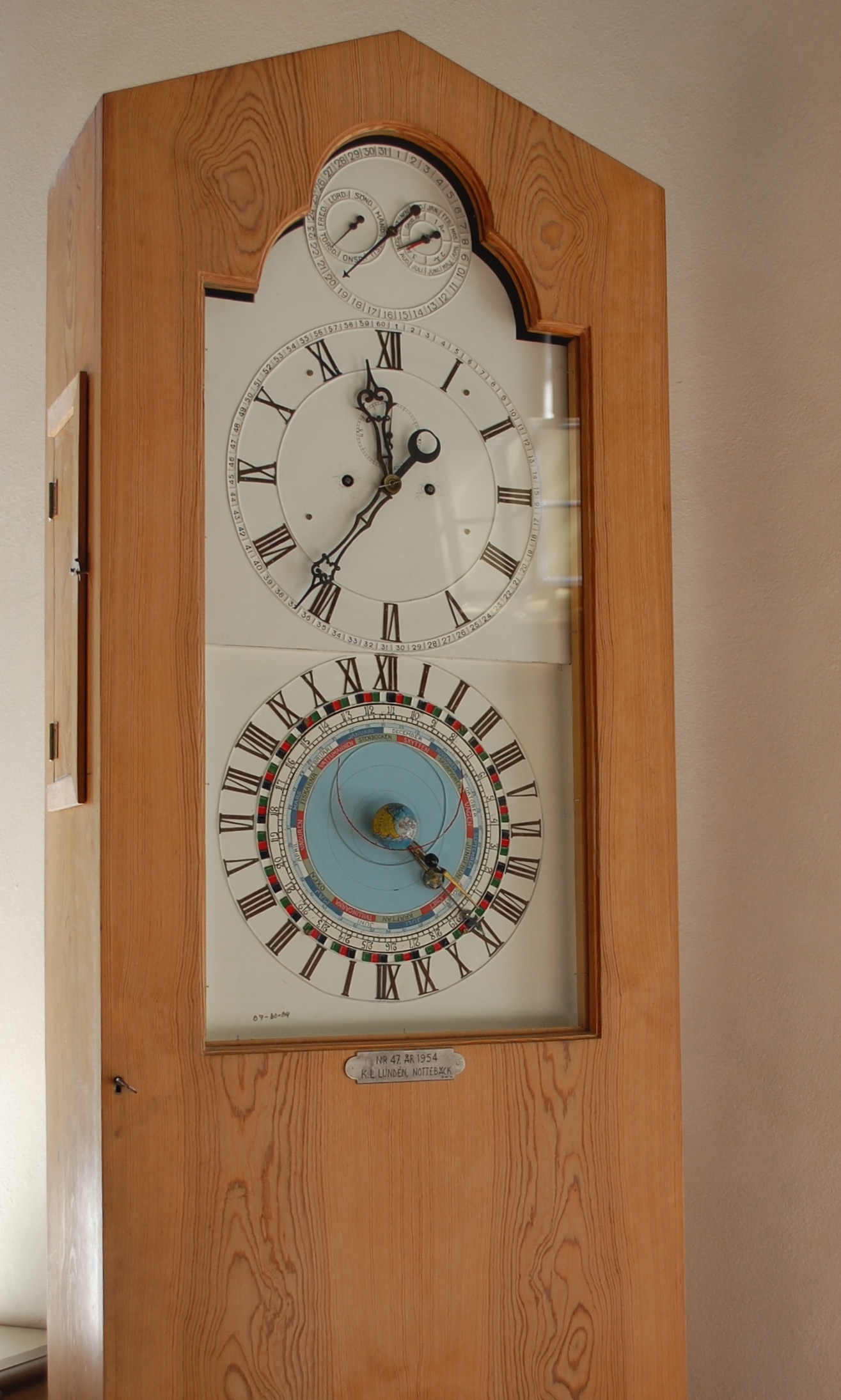
Nottebäck church clock

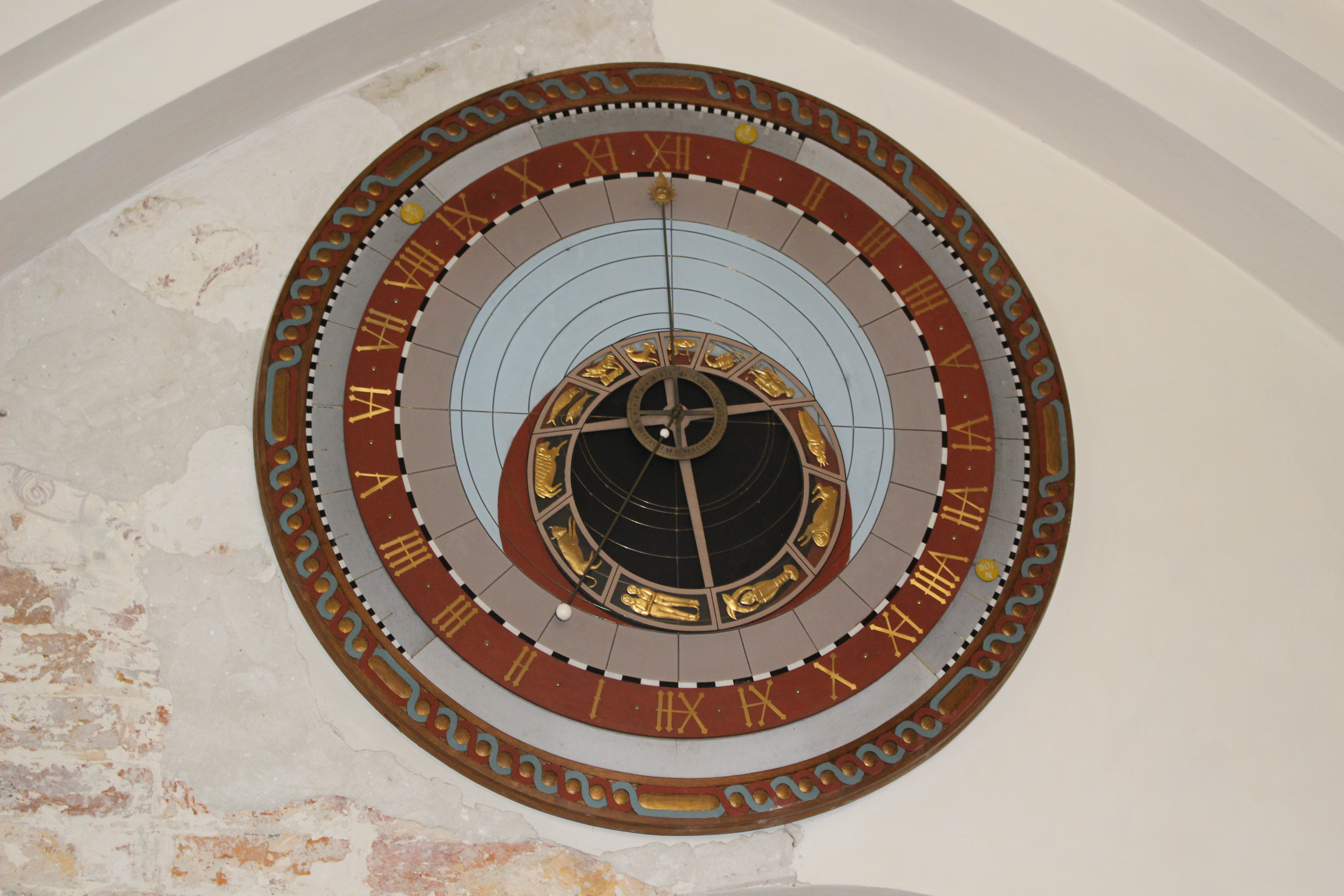
Rinkaby church clock

=== Switzerland ===
- Bern. The Zytglogge is a 15th-century astronomical clock housed in a medieval fortification tower.
- A set of 16th-century clocks which show the zodiac and the days of the week in concentric rings within a 12-hour clock face, with a moon phase ball above:
  - Bremgarten. The clock of the Spittelturm, installed in 1558.
  - Diessenhofen. The clock of the Siegelturm, installed in 1546.
  - Mellingen. The clock of the Zeitturm, installed in 1554.
  - Schaffhausen: The astronomical clock by Joachim Habrecht in the gable of the Fronwagturm, installed in 1564, has five hands, including indications of the positions of the sun and moon in the zodiac, and a dragon hand indicating the lunar nodes.
- Sion: The Sion astronomical clock on the town hall dates from 1667 to 1668. Its current mechanism was installed in 1902.
- Solothurn. This astronomical clock, installed by Lorenz Liechti and Joachim Habrecht in 1545 to replace an original of 1452, shows the positions of the sun and moon in the zodiac.
- Winterthur. This astrolabe astronomical clock was installed in 1529. The building which housed it was demolished in 1870. The clock is now an exhibit at the Museum Lindengut.
- Zug: The astronomical clock of the Zytturm was installed in 1574. Its calendar dial shows the zodiac, the lunar phase, the day of the week and the leap year cycle.
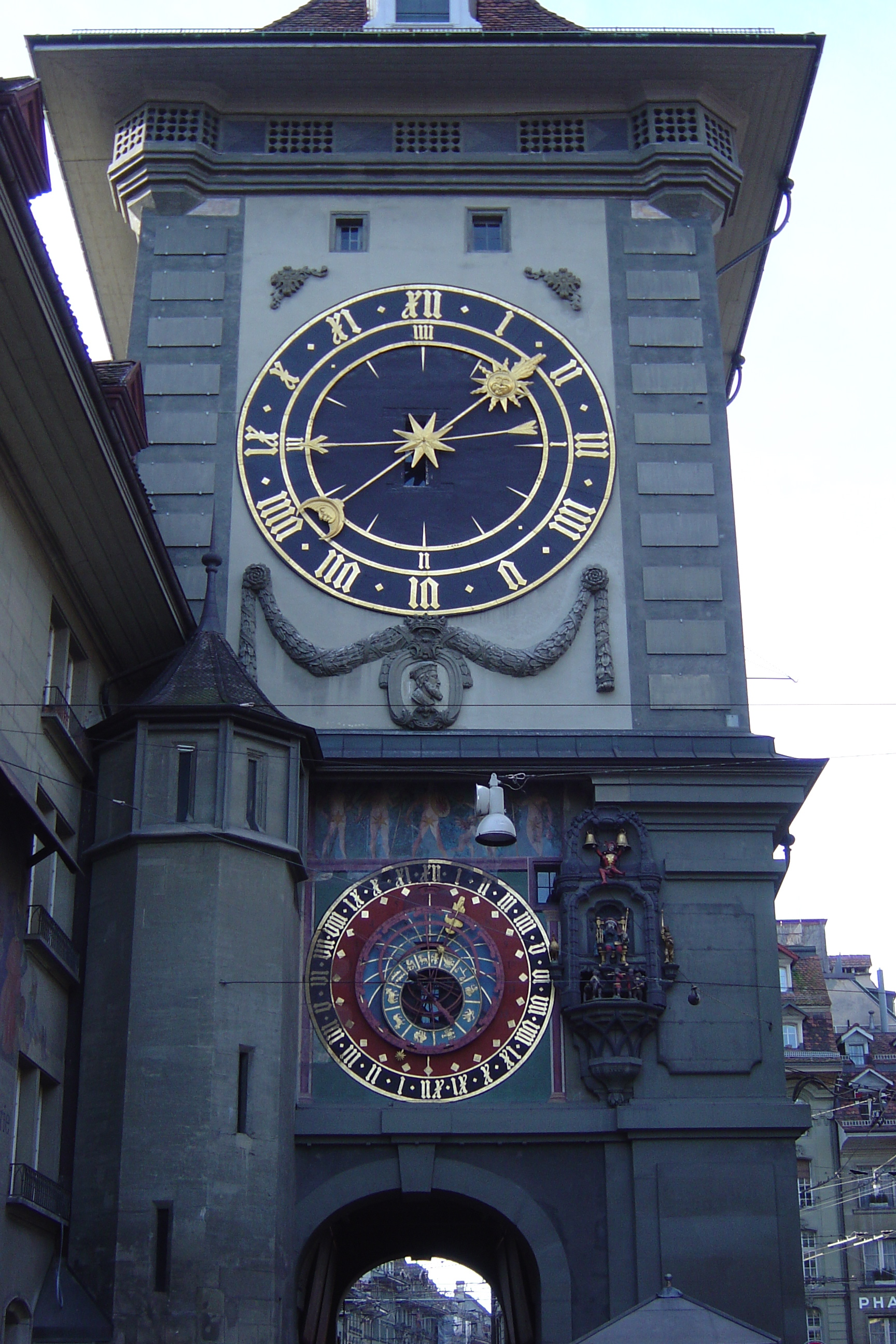
Zytglogge, Bern

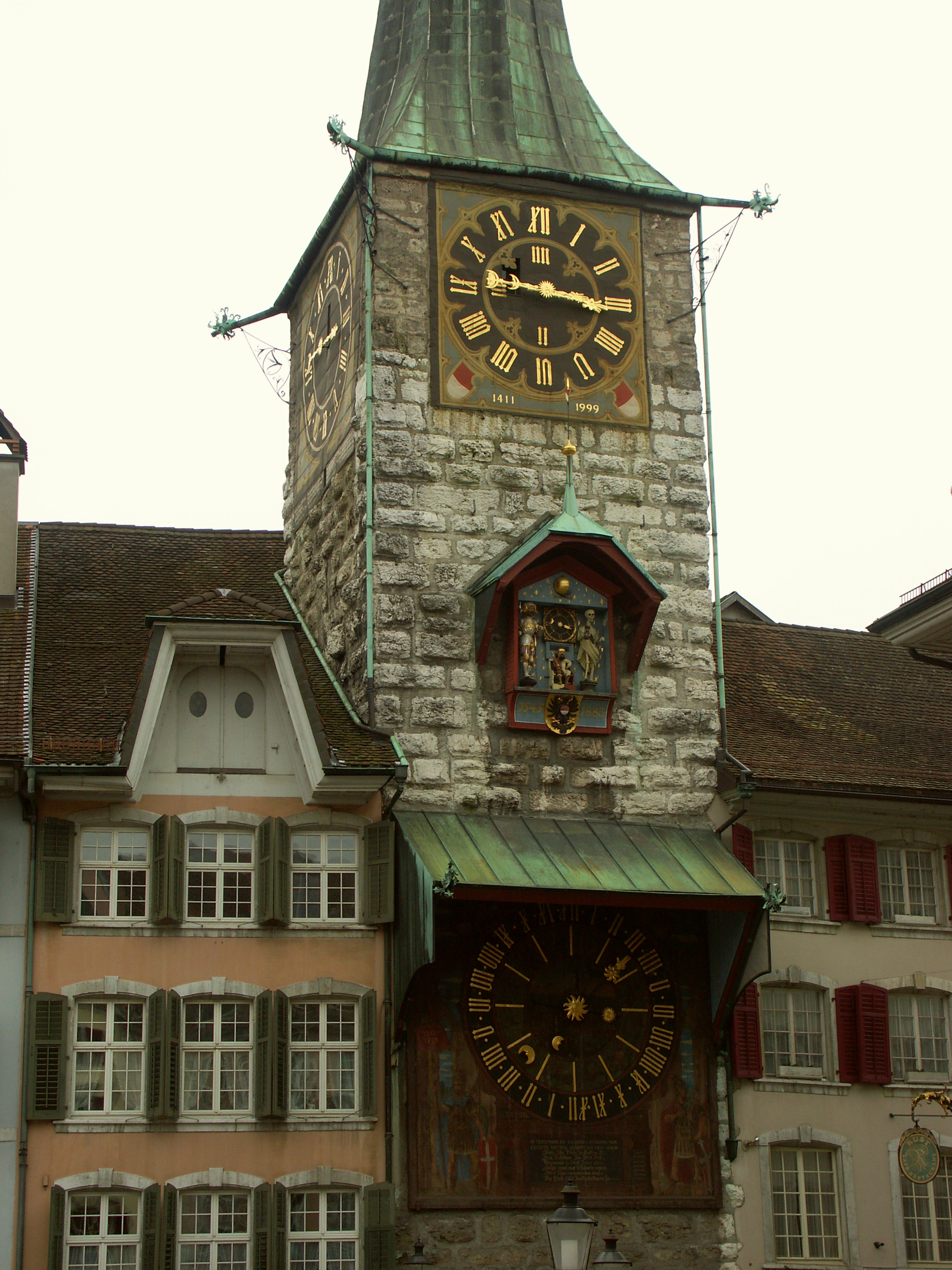
Solothurn

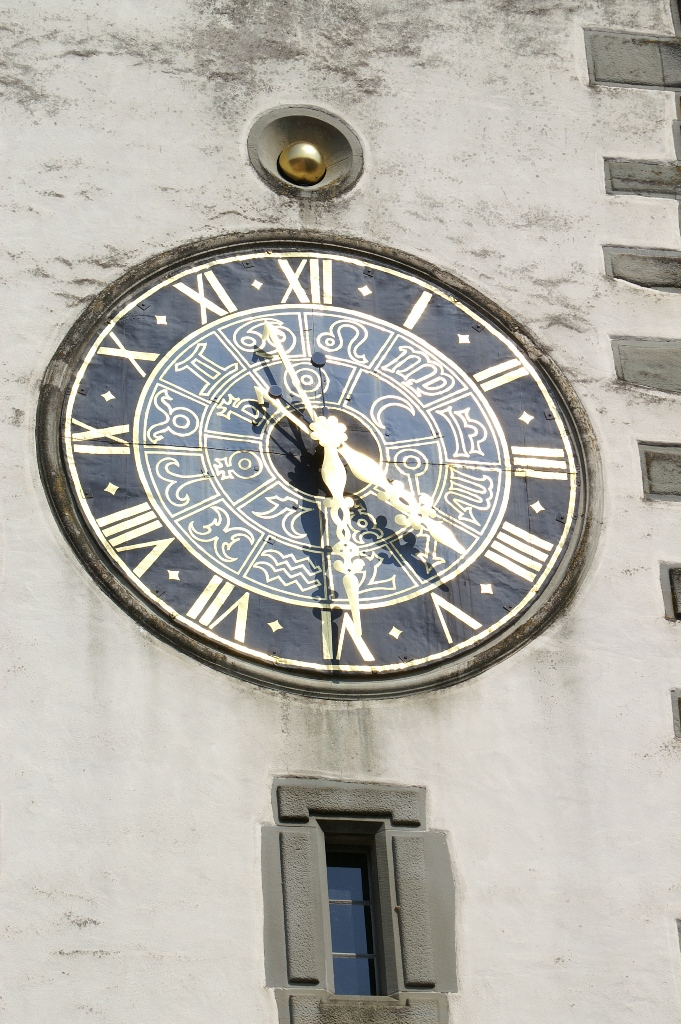
Siegelturm, Diessenhofen

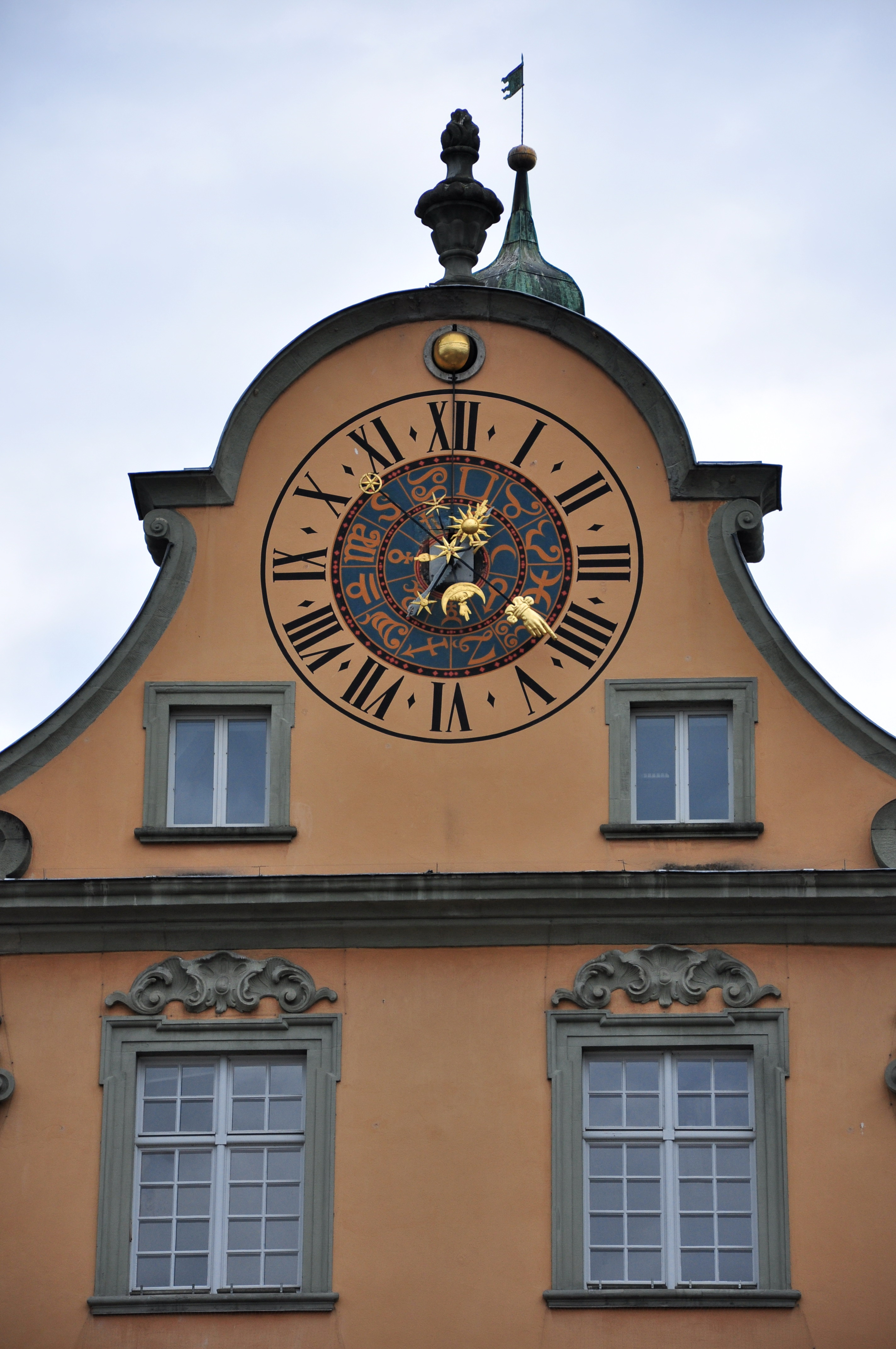
Fronwagturm, Schaffhausen

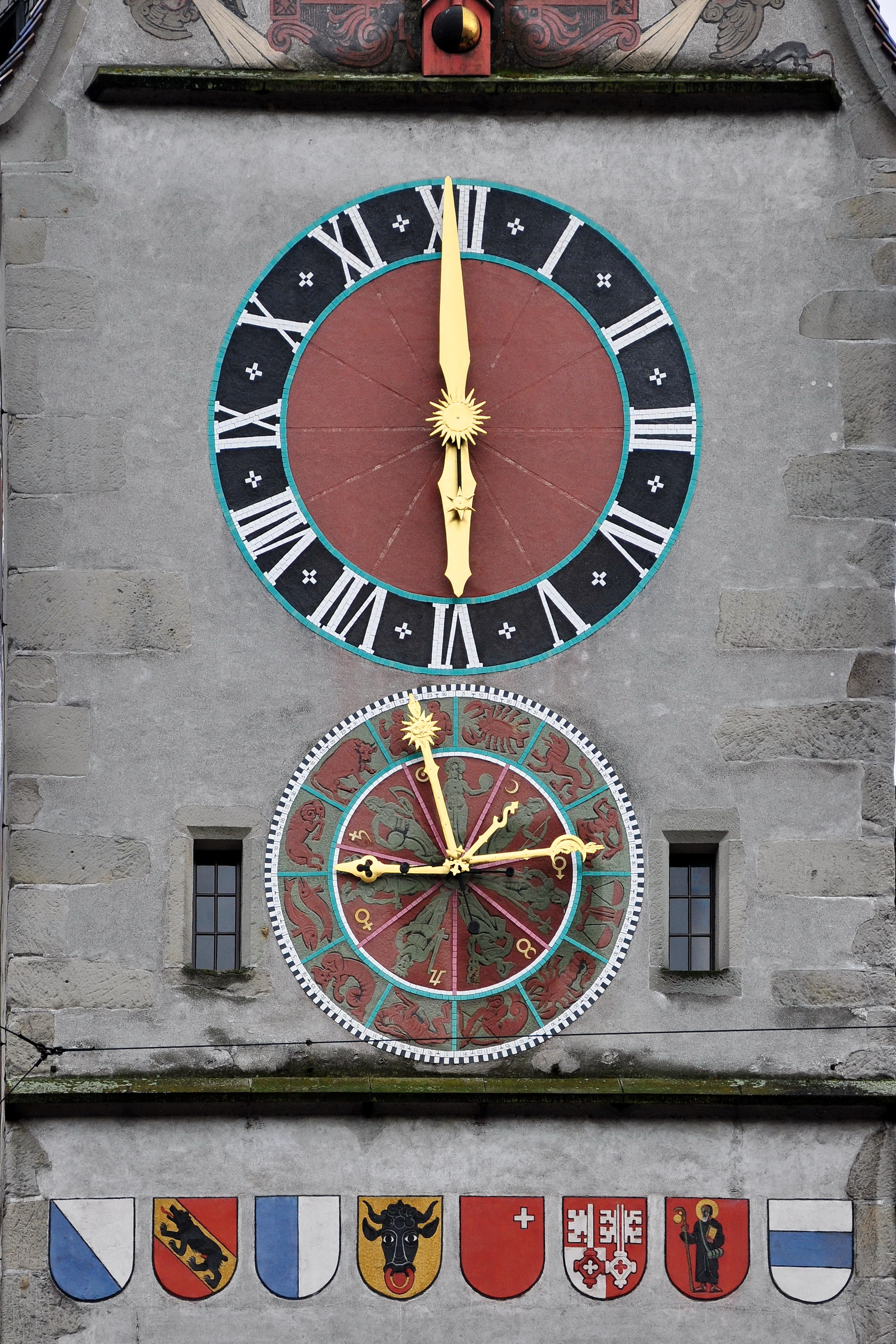
Zytturm, Zug

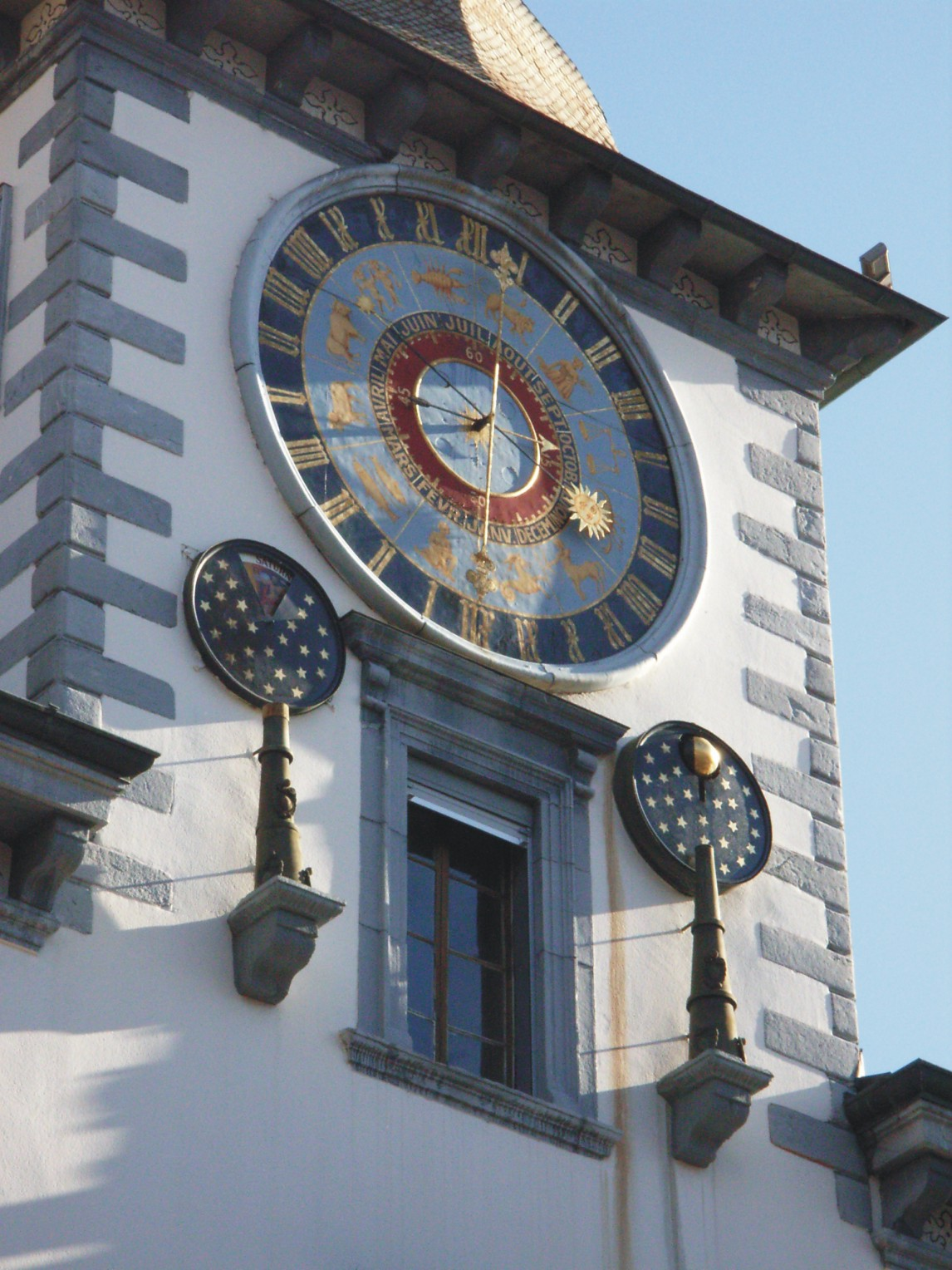
Sion

=== United Kingdom ===
- A group of four notable astronomical clocks in the West Country, dating from the 14th and 15th centuries, all of which show the 24-hour time and the moon phase:
  - Exeter. The Exeter Cathedral astronomical clock (c. 1484)
  - Ottery St Mary. The Ottery St Mary astronomical clock (15th century)
  - Wells. The Wells Cathedral clock (1386–1392)
  - Wimborne Minster. The Wimborne Minster astronomical clock (14th century)
- Durham. Prior Castell's Clock in Durham Cathedral was installed between 1494 and 1519.
- Hampton Court Palace. The Hampton Court astronomical clock (1540) is on the interior façade of the Main Gatehouse. It is an early example of a pre-Copernican astronomical clock.
- Leicester. The Leicester University astronomical clock (1989) is on the Rattray Lecture Theatre opposite the Physics department.
- London. The astrological clock of Bracken House was installed in 1959, and depicts the Signs of the Zodiac.
- Snowshill. The Nychthemeron Clock is installed in the garden of Snowshill Manor in Gloucestershire.
- St Albans. A modern clock dating from 1995 was built from notes by Richard of Wallingford held in the Bodleian Library, Oxford. It is on display in St Albans Cathedral.
- York. The York Minster astronomical clock, an astronomical clock installed in 1955 as a memorial to airmen killed in World War II, shows the positions of the sun and stars from the perspective of a pilot flying over York. It was damaged by fire in 1984, and is currently not working.
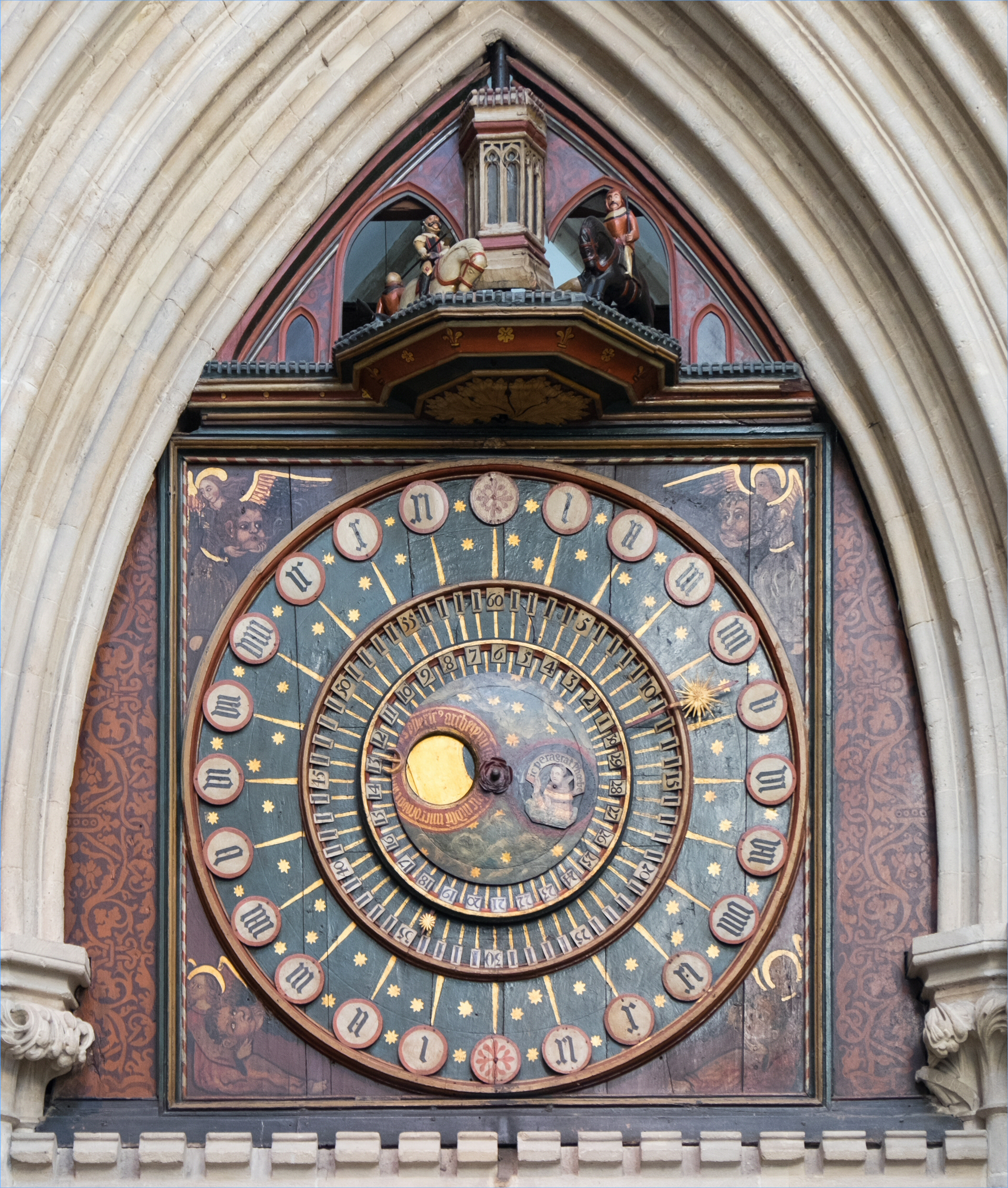
Wells Cathedral clock

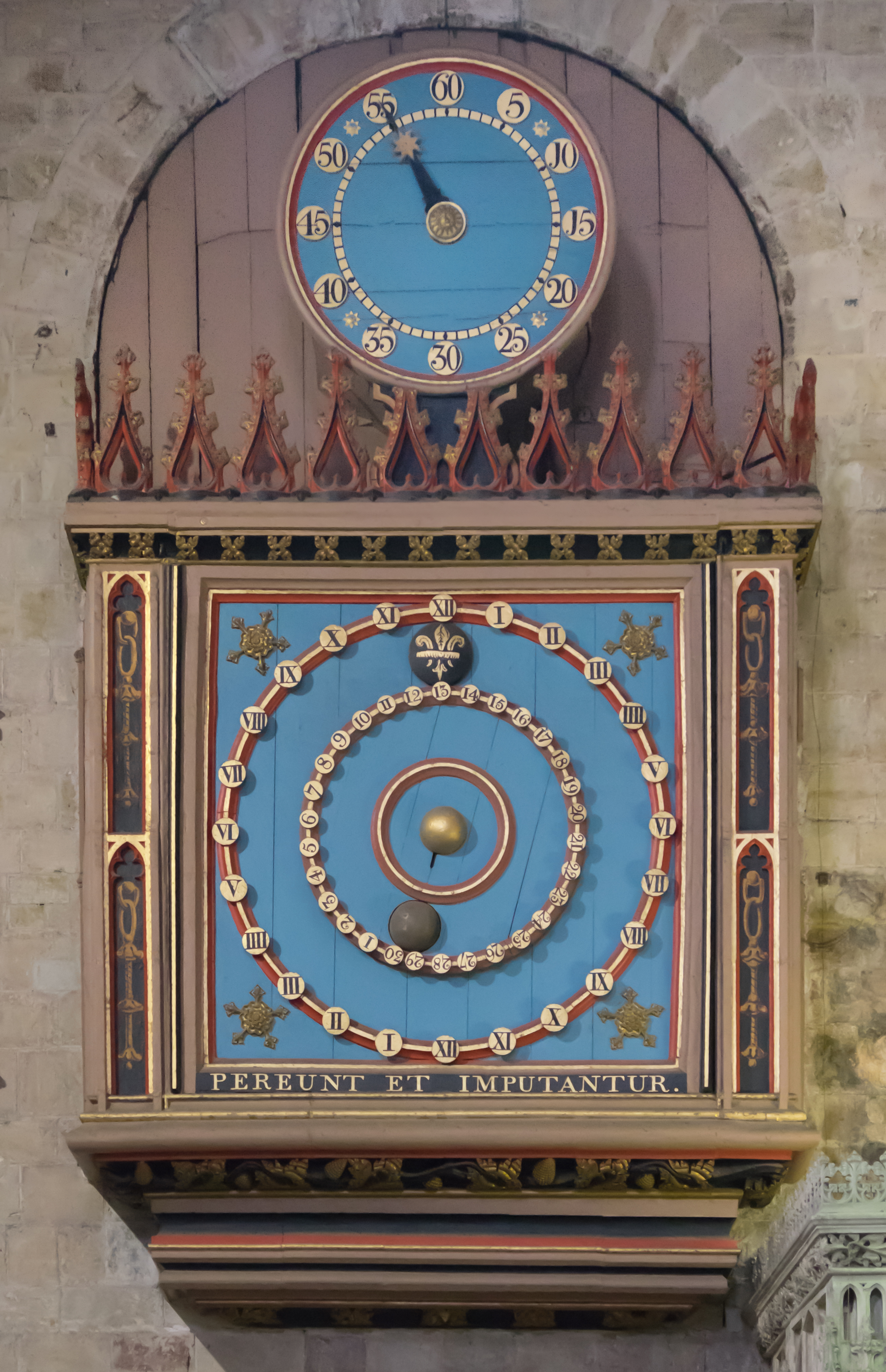
Exeter Cathedral astronomical clock

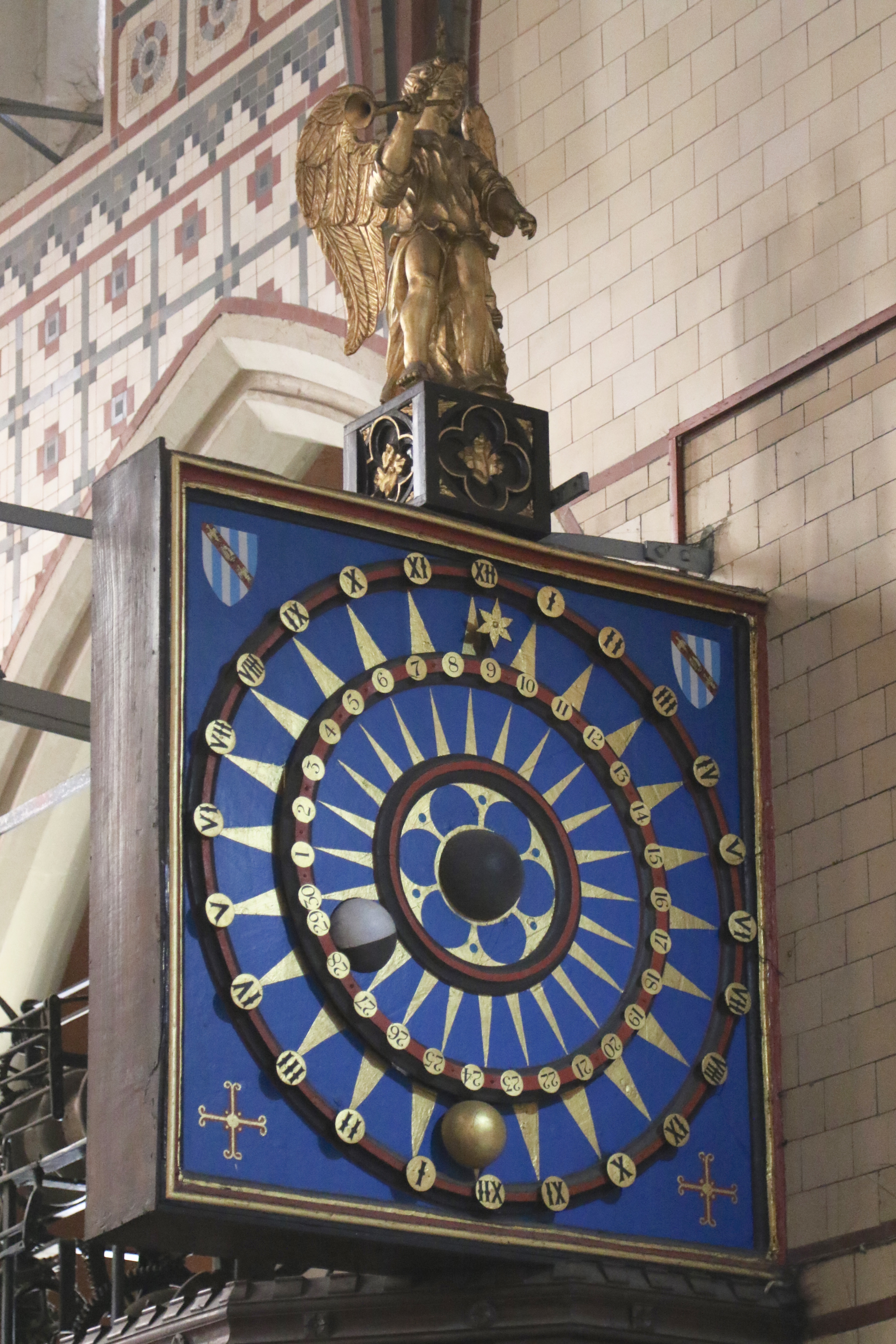
Ottery St Mary astronomical clock

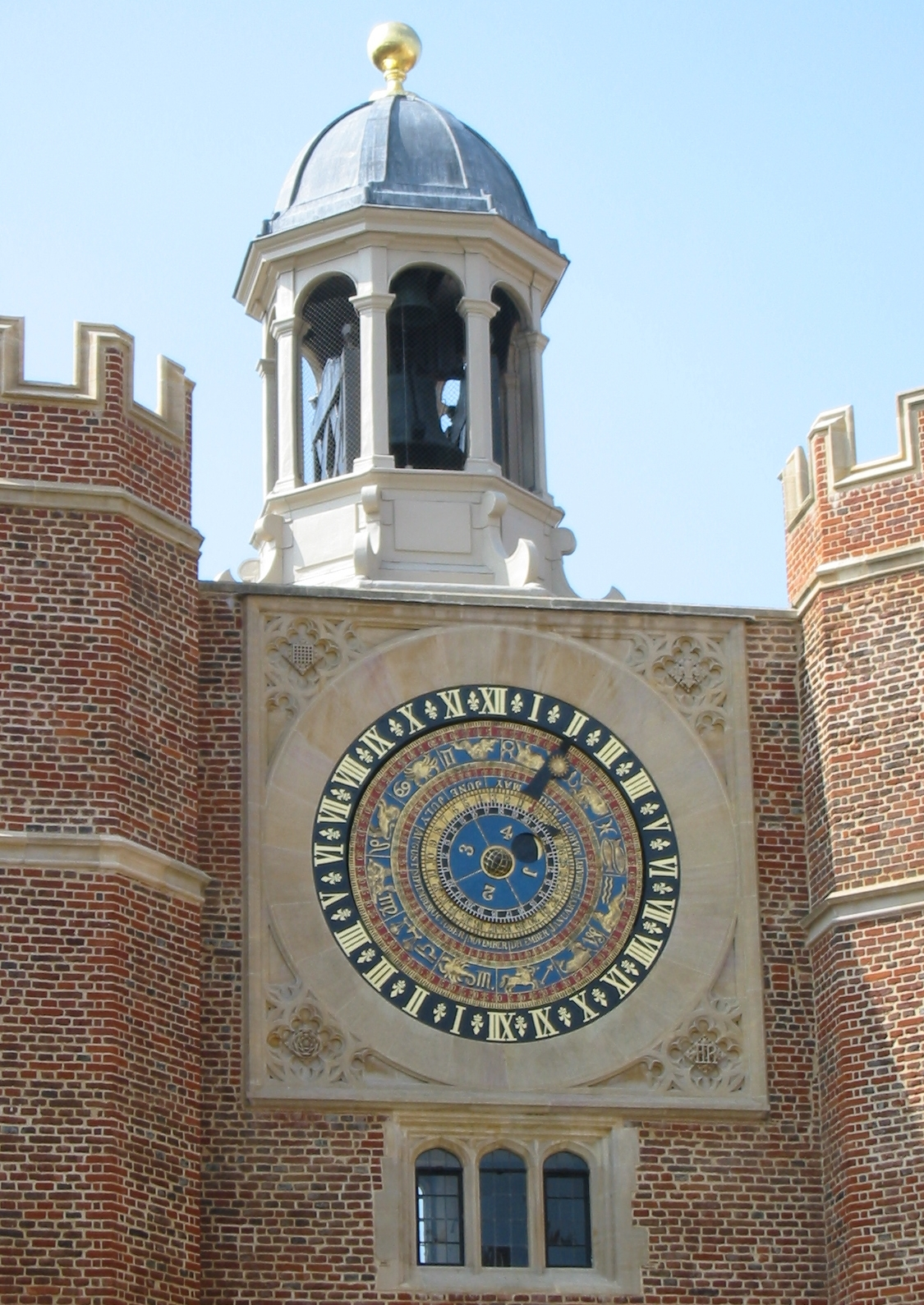
Hampton Court astronomical clock

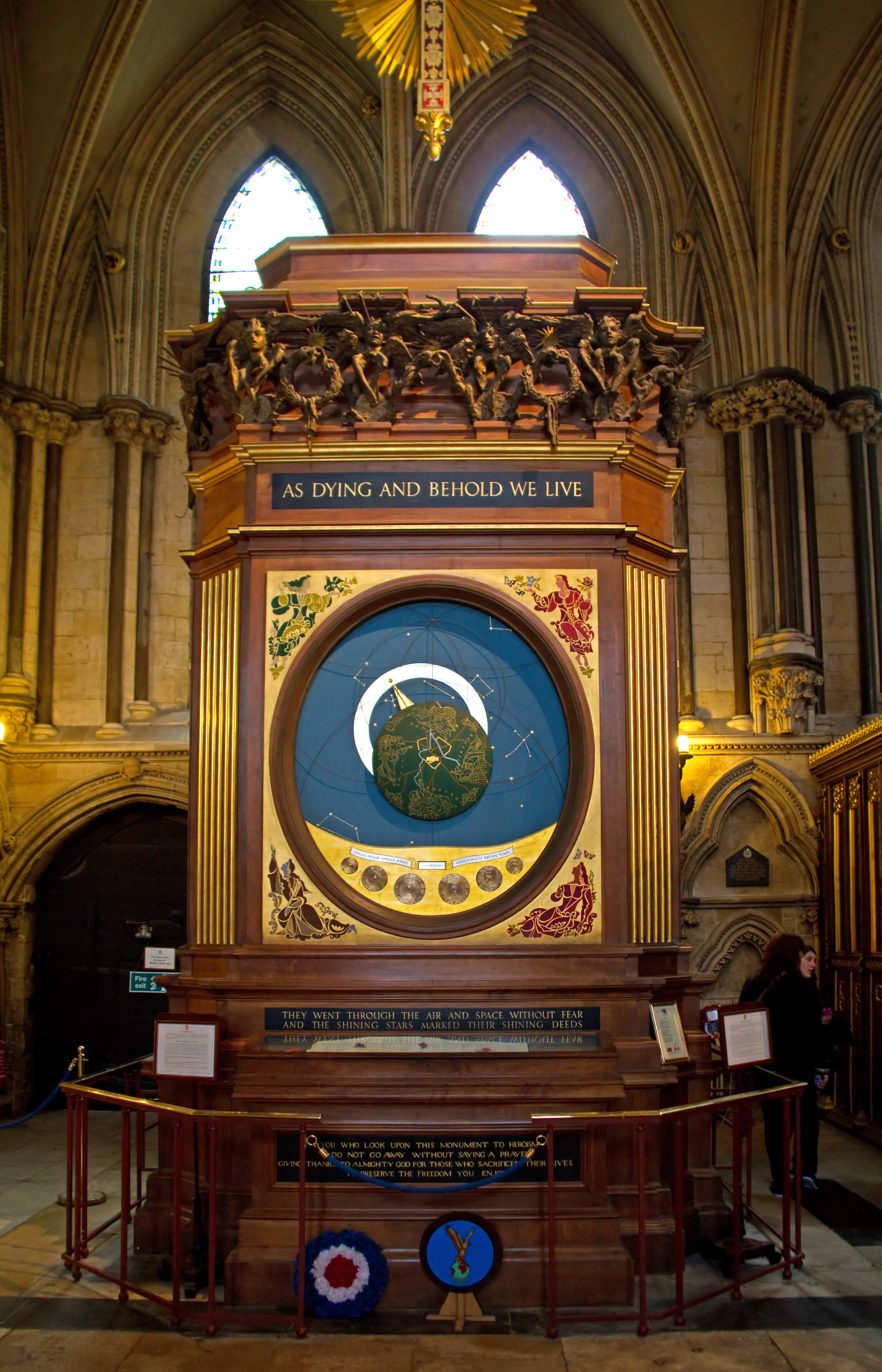
York Minster astronomical clock

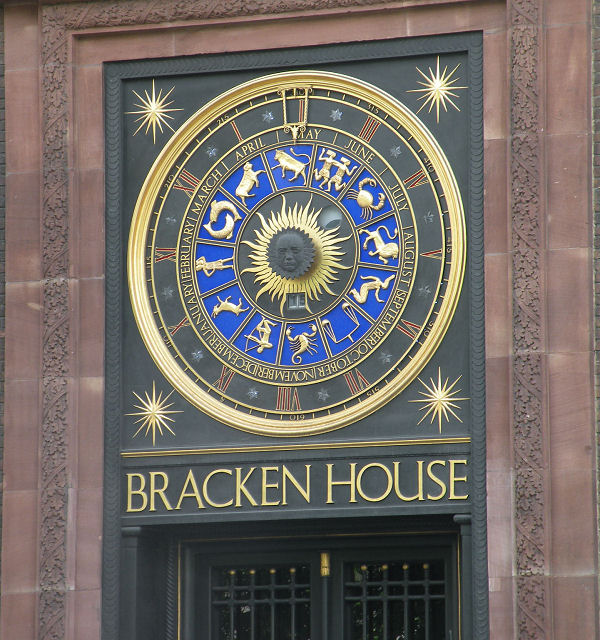
Bracken House, London astrological clock, with its blue circle showing the Signs of the Zodiac.

=== United States ===
- Cedar Rapids, Iowa: The clock tower outside the National Czech and Slovak Museum and Library features an exact replica of Prague's astronomical clock.

== See also ==
- Astrolabe
- Astrarium
- Clock of the Long Now, also called the 10,000-year clock
- Orrery
- Solar System models
- Torquetum
