= De Dondi =

De Dondi, de' Dondi or Di Dondi may refer to:

- Jacopo Dondi dell'Orologio (1293–1359), doctor and clock-maker at Padua, father of Giovanni
- Giovanni Dondi dell'Orologio (1330–1388), doctor and clock-maker at Padua, son of Jacopo
