= Piazza delle Erbe =

Piazza dei Signori may refer to:

- Piazza delle Erbe, Verona
- Piazza delle Erbe, Mantua
- Piazza delle Erbe, Padua
