= Jacopo Dondi dall'Orologio =

Venetian physician and horologist (1290–1359)

- Born: Jacopo de' Dondi; 1290; Chioggia
- Died: 1359 (aged 68–69); Padua
- Occupations: doctor, astronomer, clock-maker, polymath
- Known for: Astronomical clock in Padova, 1344

Jacopo Dondi dall'Orologio (1290–1359), also known as Jacopo de' Dondi, was a doctor, astronomer and clock-maker active in Padua, now in the Veneto region of Italy. He is remembered as a pioneer in the art of clock design and construction. He was the father of Giovanni Dondi dall'Orologio. Jacopo Dondi wrote on a number of subjects, including surgery, pharmacology, astrology and natural science.

== Life ==
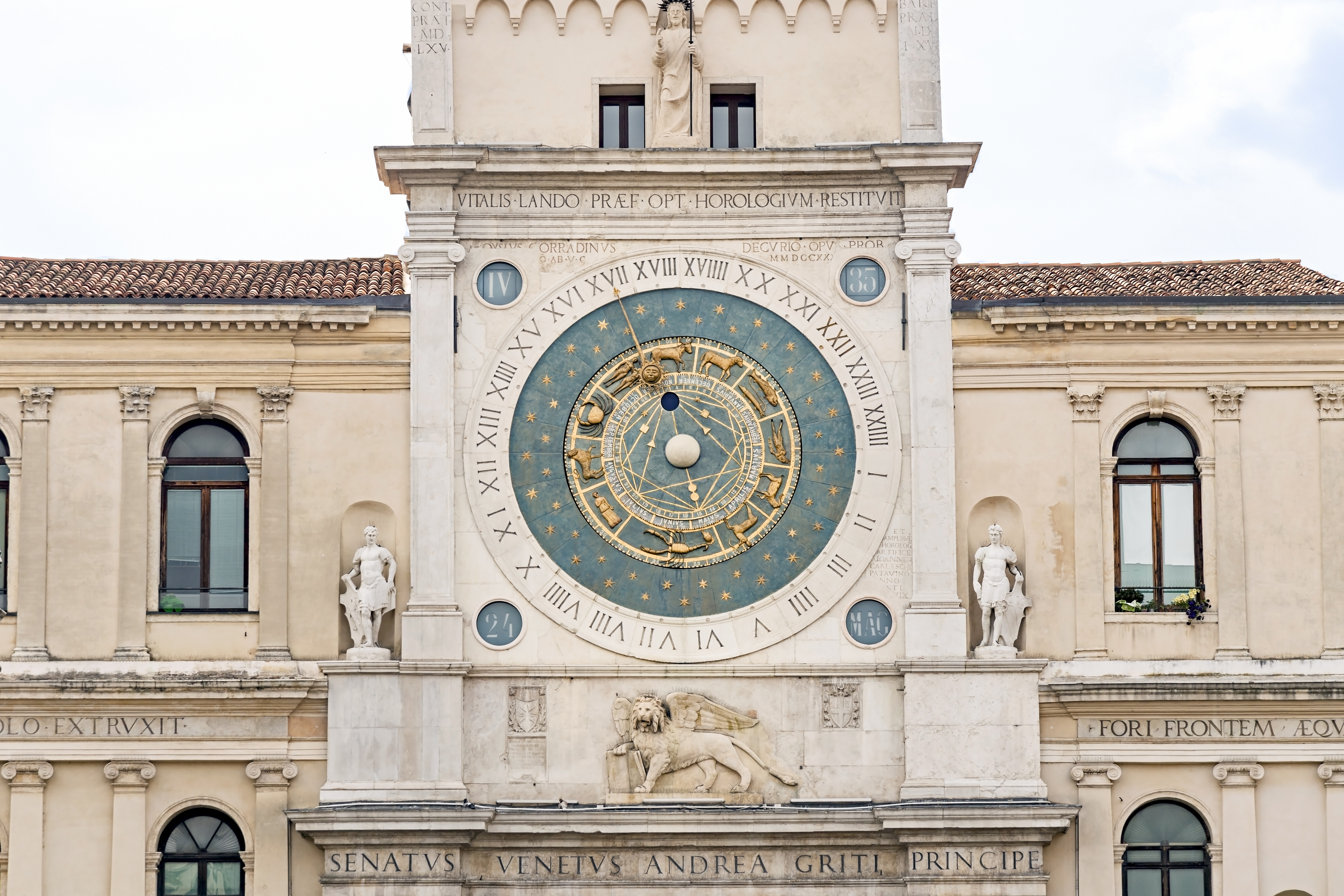
The replica of the astronomical clock of Jacopo Dondi dall'Orologio in the Torre dell'Orologio of Padova

Jacopo Dondi was born in Chioggia, the son of a doctor named Isacco. He attended the University of Padua and was elected municipal physician in Chioggia in 1313. In about 1327 he married Zaccarota Centrago or Centraco, with whom he had eight children; the second-born child, Giovanni, became famous as the builder of the Astrarium. On 28 February 1334, Jacopo received Venetian citizenship from the Doge Francesco Dandolo. In 1342 he moved to Padova, where he became a professor of medicine and of astronomy at the University.

He supervised the construction of a large public clock with a dial, commissioned by Prince Ubertino I da Carrara. He may also have contributed to its design. The clock was installed in the tower of the Palazzo del Capitaniato of Padua in 1344. There is some evidence that it indicated and struck the hours from 1 to 24, and also that it displayed the age and phase of the moon and the place of the sun in the zodiac. Both the tower and the clock were destroyed in 1390, when the Milanese stormed the palace. A replica of the clock is in the Torre dell'Orologio of Padua, which was built in 1428.

He died in Padua between 29 April and 26 May 1359, and was buried outside the Baptistry of San Giovanni, Padua.

== Written works ==
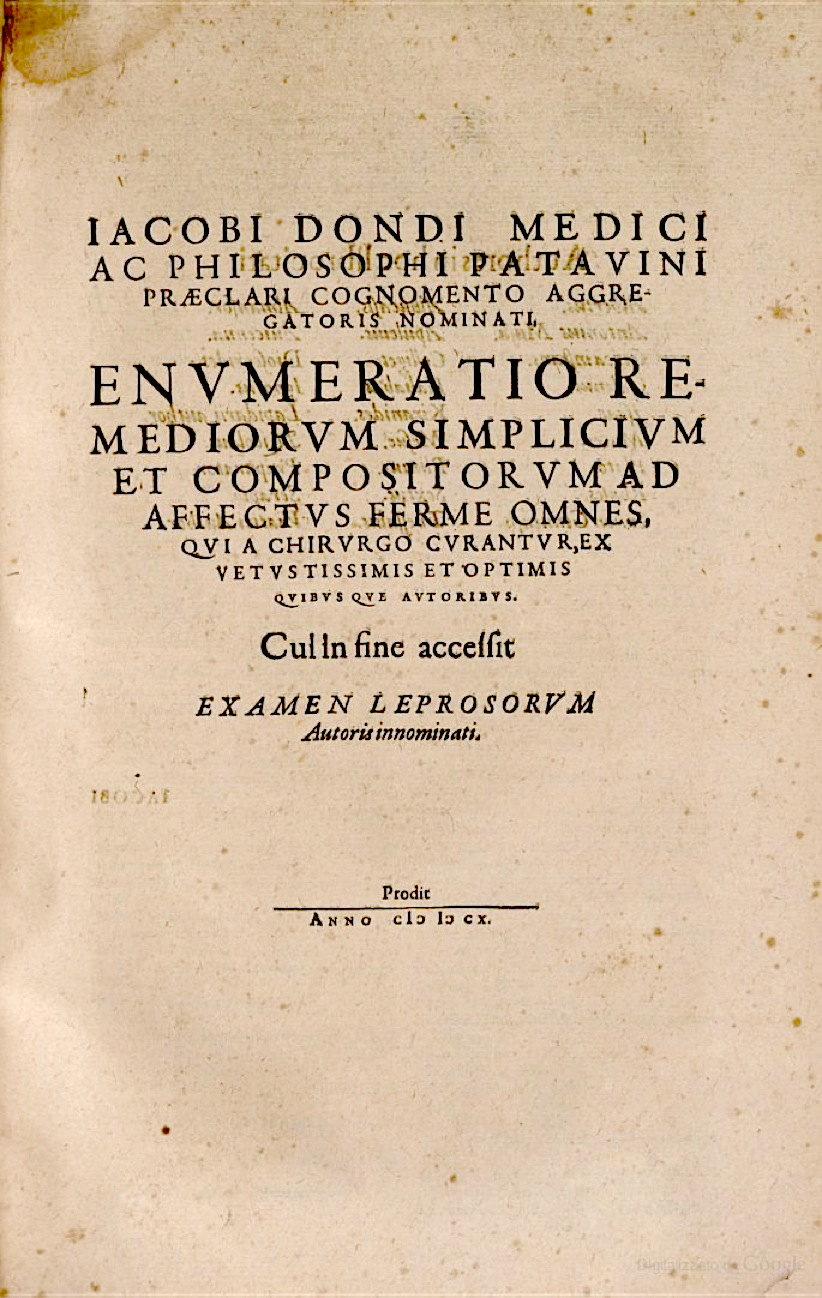
Title-page of the 1610 edition of Dondi's Enumeratio remediorum.

The most celebrated work of Jacopo Dondi is the Aggregator or Promptuarium medicinae ed Enumeratio remediorum simplicium et compositorum, completed in 1355 and conserved in manuscript in the Vatican (Vat. lat. 2462, fourteenth century), the Collegio di Spagna, Bologna (MS 153, dated 1425) and the Bibliothèque Nationale in Paris (Lat. 6973 and 6974). It was published in Strasburg in about 1470 by the "R-printer" (Adolph Rusch) and in Venice in 1481 by Michele Manzolo. It was reprinted in Venice in 1542 by Tommaso and Giovanni Maria Giunta, and again in 1576. The section on surgery, Enumeratio remediorum simplicium et compositorum ad affectus omnes qui a chirurgo curantur, was included in the Chirurgia: de chirurgia scriptores optimi quique veteres et recentiores of Conrad Gesner, printed at Zurich in 1555 by his cousins Andreas and Iacobus Gesner, and in the Thesaurus chirurgiae of Peter Uffenbach (1610).

The Aggregator should not be confused with the illustrated Herbarius of Peter Schöffer (Mainz, 1484; subsequently reprinted at Venice, in Latin and in Italian with the title Herbolario), which was subtitled Aggregator practicus de simplicibus.

In natural science, Dondi published in about 1355 a Tractatus de causa salsedinis aquarum et modo conficiendi sal artificiale ex aquis Thermalibus Euganeis (Biblioteca del Seminario, Padua, ms. 4540), which was included in Giunti's De balneis omnia quae extant apud Graecos, Latinos et Arabas (1553), together with De fontibus calidis agri Patavini consideratio by his son Giovanni.

Dondi's treatise on the tides, De fluxu atque refluxu maris, probably dates from between 1355 and 1359. It was frequently cited in the fourteenth and fifteenth centuries; the De fluxu ac refluxu maris subtilis et erudita disputatio of Federico Delfino (1559) plagiarises it, as does the anonymous sixteenth-century manuscript Questio de estu sive de fluxu et refluxu maris per sex horas in the Biblioteca Casanatense of Rome.

Dondi is credited with having painted the first topographic map of the territory of Padua. Now lost, it was used by his son Giovanni in the negotiations following the war of 1372–73 between Venice and Padua, and is described as "a map by the hand of Jacomo de' Dondi, physician, who was a most subtle man in the art of painting" ("una carta facta per man de un maistro Jacomo de' Dondi fisico, el qual fo subtilissimo homo in l'arte de pinger").

Dondi made an adaptation to the meridian of Padua of the astrological Tabulae de motibus planetarum or Toletanae, the alfonsine tables attributed to Alfonso X el Sabio, King of Castile. The work was in the possession of Giovanni in 1389, and was cited and praised by Beldomandi in his Canones de motibus corporum supercoelestium (1424), but was later lost. It has also been suggested that it was the work not of Jacopo but of one of his sons, either Gabriele or Giovanni.

In his Ad inveniendum primum ascendens nativitatis, preserved in manuscripts in the Bodleian Library, Oxford (1468; Canon. misc. 436) and the Osterreichische Nationalbibliotek, Vienna, (fifteenth century; Lat. 5208), Dondi showed that the ascendant at the time of birth was the same as the house of the moon at the time of conception.

A short historical work preserved in manuscripts in the Biblioteca Nazionale Marciana (Marc. lat. X, 34 (3129)) and the Biblioteca del Seminario di Padova (MS. 11) dates from about 1334.

Dondi also wrote on grammar. Bernardino Scardeone records a manuscript copied in Venice in 1372 of Dondi's expositiones on the Magnae derivationes of Uguccione da Pisa. Thought to be lost, the work survives in manuscripts in the Fitzwilliam Museum, Cambridge, (301), the Bodleian (Canon. misc. 201) and the Biblioteca universitaria of Pavia (Aldini 258).
