= Astrarium =

Timepiece and astronomical prediction device

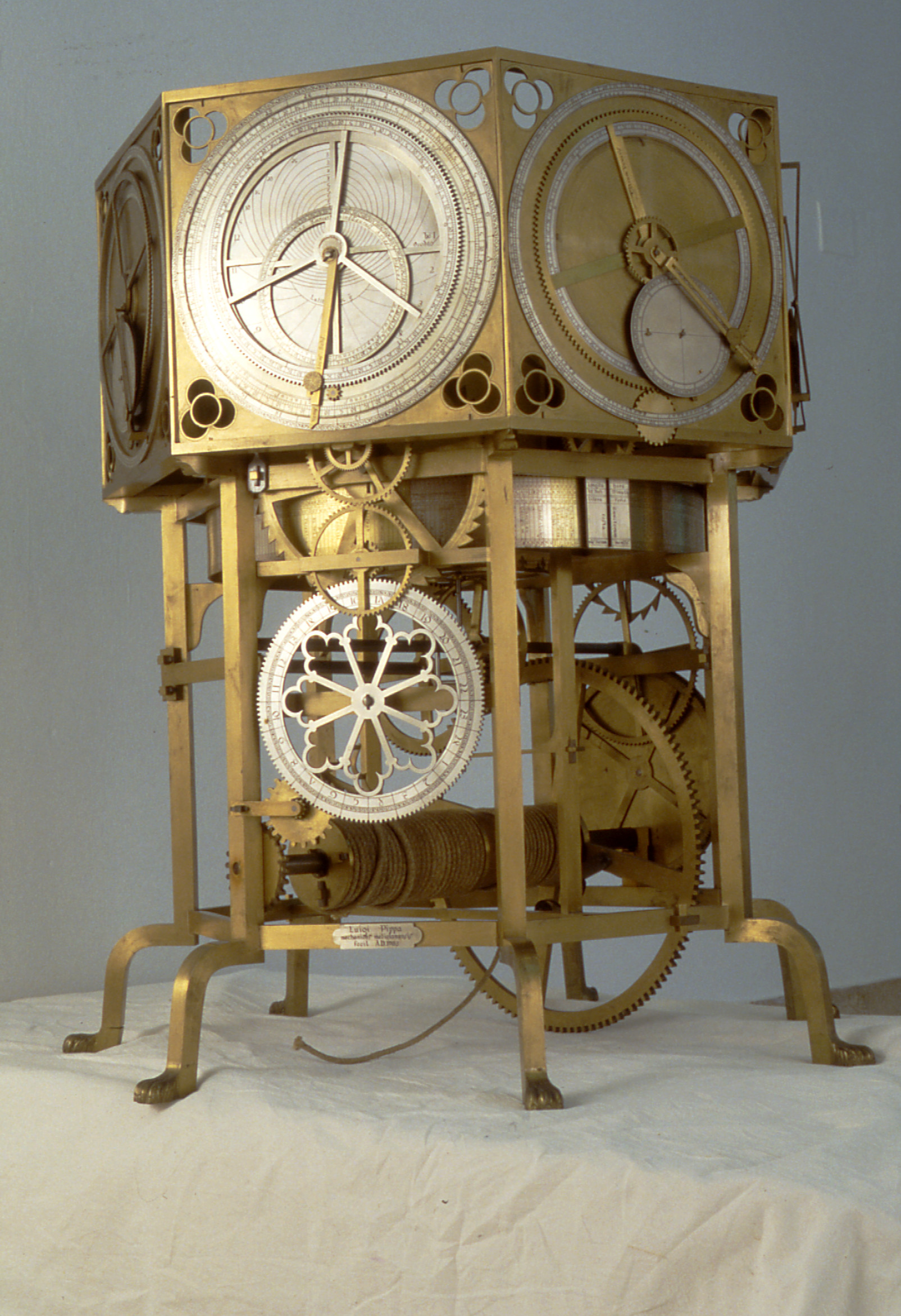
The astrarium made by Giovanni Dondi dell'Orologio showed hour, year calendar, movement of the planets, Sun and Moon. Reconstruction, Museo Nazionale Scienza e Tecnologia Leonardo da Vinci, Milan.

An astrarium, also called a planetarium, is a medieval astronomical clock made in the 14th century by Italian engineer and astronomer Giovanni Dondi dell'Orologio. The Astrarium was modeled after the Solar System and, in addition to counting time and representing calendar dates and holidays, showed how the planets moved around the celestial sphere in one timepiece. This was its main task, in comparison with the astronomical clock, the main task of which is the actual reading of time. A complex mechanism, it combined the functions of a modern planetarium, clock, and calendar into a singular constructive device. Devices that perform this function were known to have been created prior to the design of Dondi, though relatively little is known about them. It is occasionally erroneously claimed by the details of some sources that the Astrarium was the first mechanical device showing the movements of the planets.

== History ==
=== Greek and Roman World ===
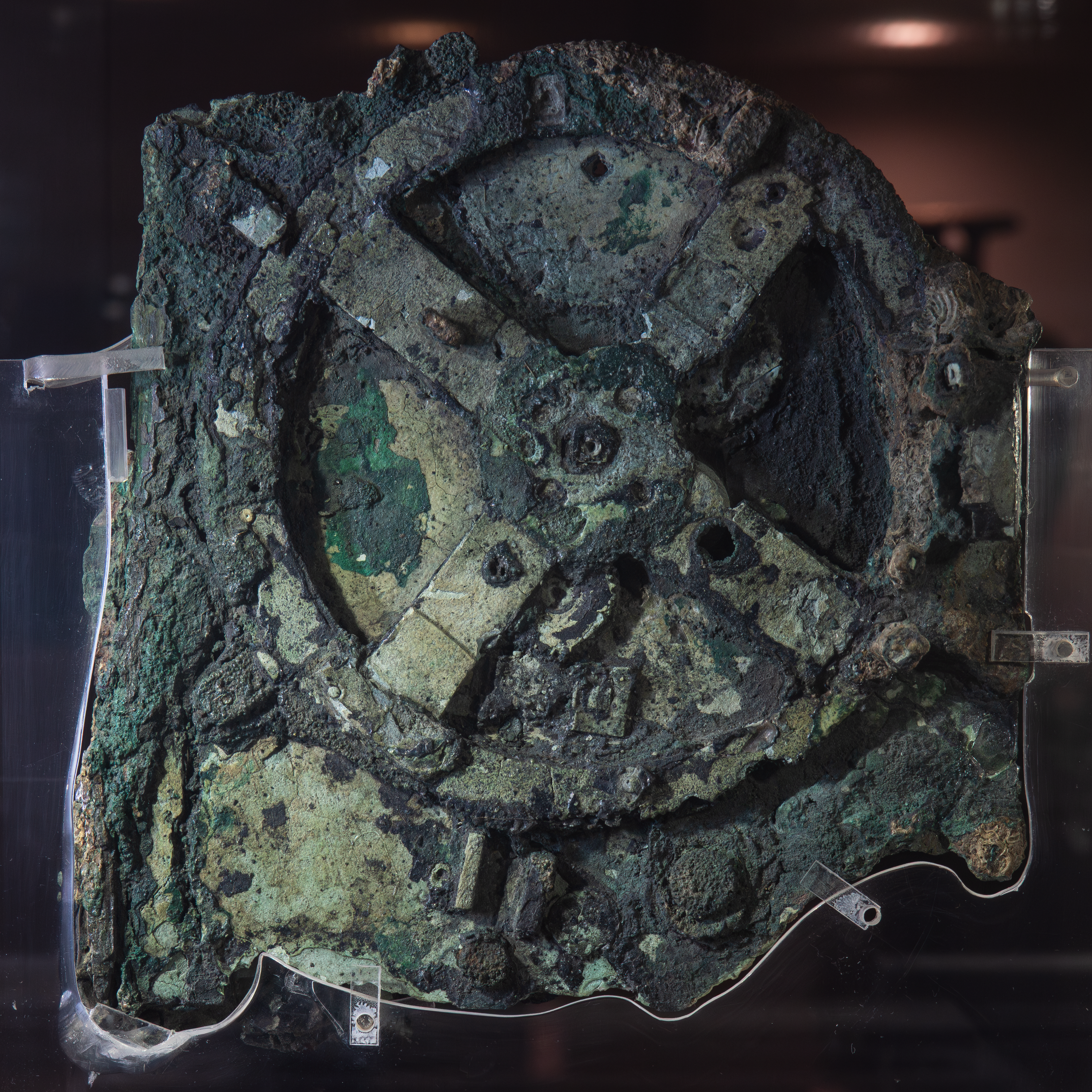
The Antikythera mechanism (main fragment), found in the Aegean Sea

The first astraria were mechanical devices. Archimedes is said to have used a primitive version that could predict the positions of the Sun, the Moon, and the planets. On May 17, 1902, an archaeologist named Valerios Stais discovered that a lump of oxidated material, which had been recovered from a shipwreck near the Greek island of Antikythera, held within it a mechanism with cogwheels. This mechanism, known as the Antikythera mechanism, was recently redated to end of the 2nd century BCE. Extensive study of the fragments, using X-rays, has revealed enough details (gears, pinions, crank) to enable researchers to build partial replicas of the original device. Engraved on the major gears are the names of the planets, which leaves little doubt as to the intended use of the mechanism.

By the collapse of the Roman Empire, the know-how and science behind this piece of clockwork was lost.

=== Middle Ages and Renaissance ===
According to historians Bedini and Maddison, the earliest astrarium clock with an "almost complete description and incontestable documentation" to have survived is the astrarium completed in 1364 by Giovanni de' Dondi (1318–1388), a scholar and physician of the Middle Ages. The original clock, consisting of 107 wheels and pinions, has been lost, perhaps during the sacking of Mantua in 1630, but de' Dondi left detailed descriptions, which have survived, enabling a reconstruction of the clock. It displays the mean time, sidereal (or star) time and the motions of the Sun, Moon and the five then-known planets Mercury, Venus, Mars, Jupiter, and Saturn. It was conceived according to a Ptolemaic conception of the Solar System. De' Dondi was inspired by his father Jacopo who designed the astronomical clock in the Piazzi dei Signori, Padua, in 1344 – one of the first of its type.

In later ages, more astraria were built. A famous example is the Eise Eisinga Planetarium, built in 1774 by Eise Eisinga from Dronrijp, Friesland, the Netherlands. It displayed all the planets and was fixed to the ceiling in a house in Franeker, where it can still be visited.

In modern times, the astrarium has grown into a tourist attraction as a commercially exploited planetarium-showing in IMAX theaters, with such presentations as The History of the Universe, as well as other astronomical phenomena.

== See also ==
- Astronomical clock
- Orrery
- Planetarium

== Literature ==
- Giovanni Dondi dell'Orologio – "Tractatus astarii"
