= Sant'Alvise =

Church in Cannaregio, Italy

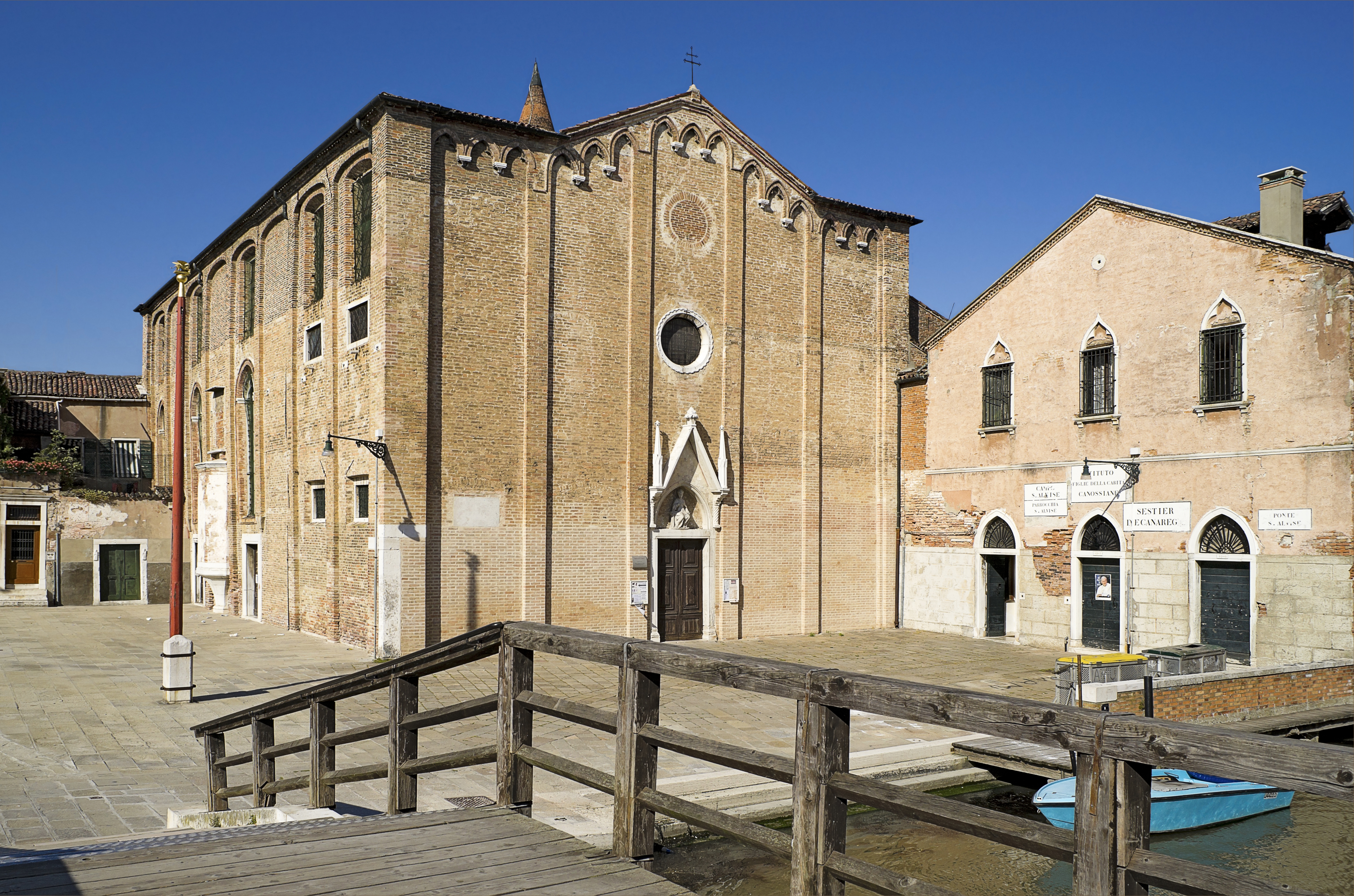
- Sant'Alvise in Venice

- Location within Venice Location within Italy

Religion
- Affiliation: Roman Catholic
- Province: Venice

Location
- Location: Venice, Italy
- Interactive map of Sant'Alvise
- Coordinates: 45.4475°N 12.3292°E

Architecture
- Completed: 1338

Sant'Alvise is a church in the sestiere of Cannaregio in Venice, northern Italy. The brick exterior and facade do not reflect the rich interior.

== History ==
According to tradition, the church was built, along with the adjoining monastery, by Antonia Venier in 1338 and dedicated to St. Louis of Toulouse, known in Venice as Saint Alvise.

The church was built on the plan of a basilica. The simple facade is marked by a large doorway made of Istria stone. Above the door is a statue of Saint Alvise from 1400. The original wooden structures were rebuilt in 1430 due in part to the generosity of Pope Martin V. The church was restored in the XVII century, the interior almost completely remodeled. The Gothic bell tower dates from the XIII Century.

== Interior ==
It has a single nave, the current appearance dating from the 17th century restoration. On the interior facade above the entrance porch you can see a "barco". A special piece on the counter-facade. Protected by wrought iron gates, behind which the enclosed nuns could attend the religious services.

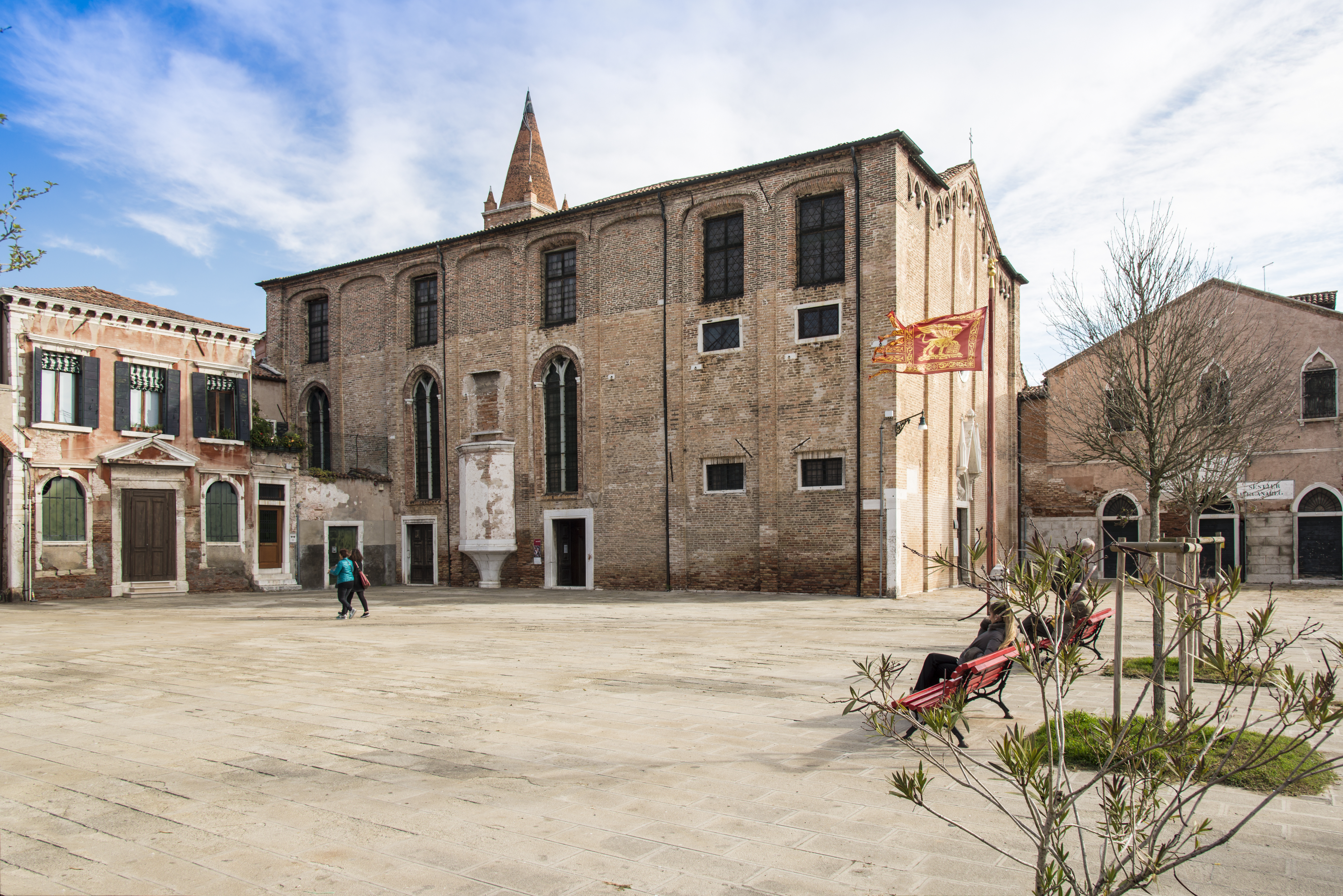
West Facade on campo

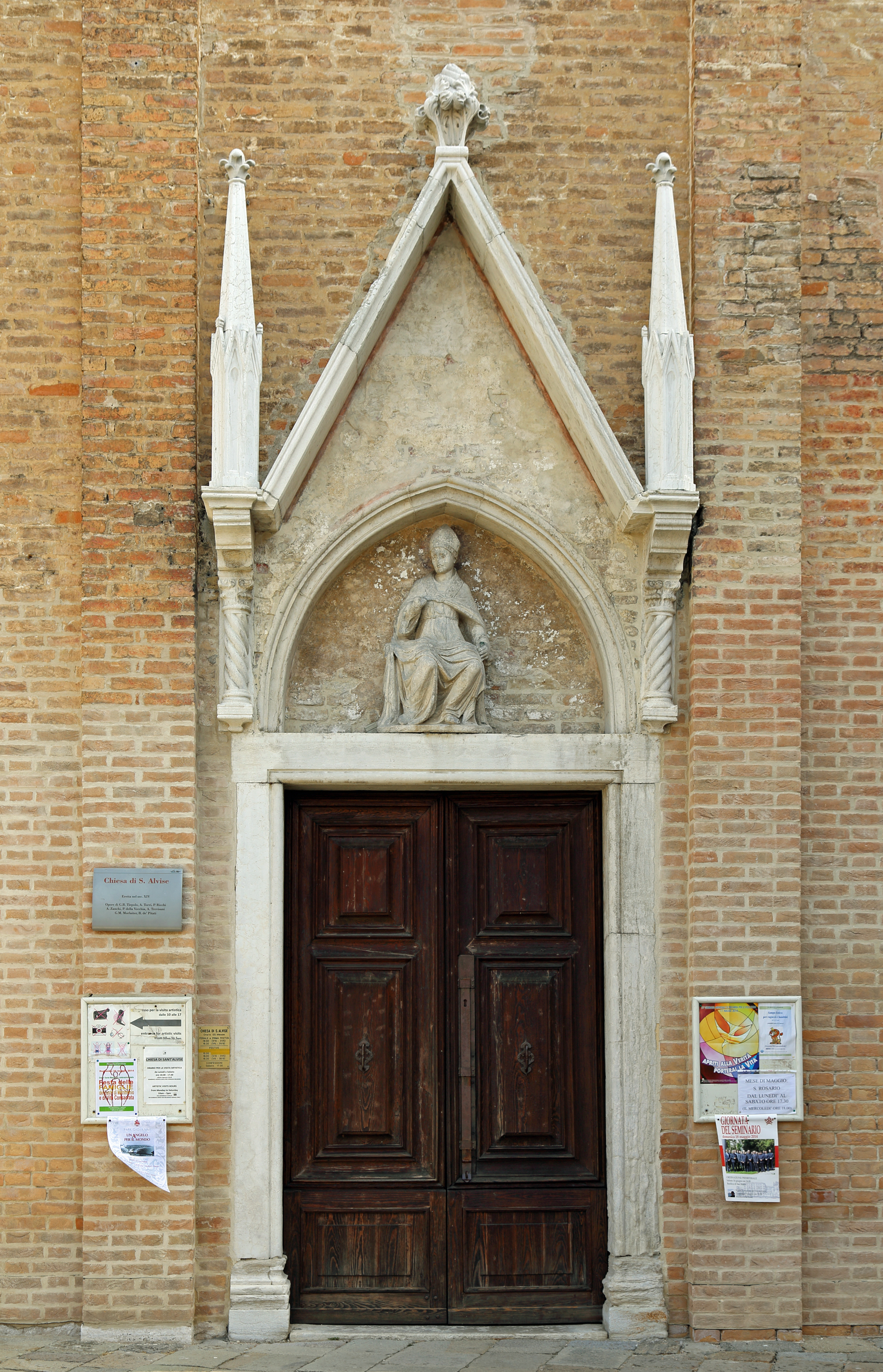
Main entrance

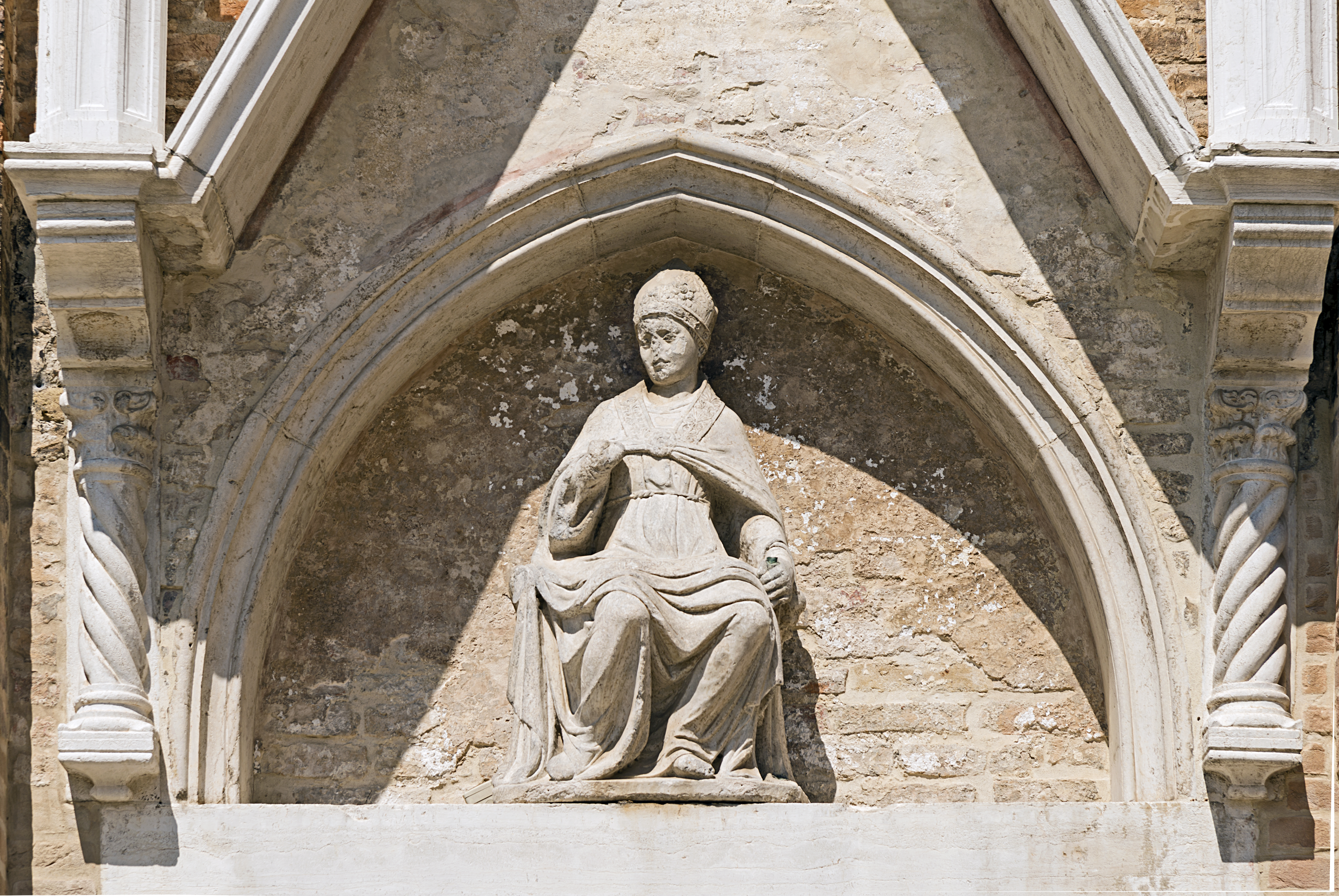
Statue of St. Louis of Toulouse

== Art work ==
The ceiling was entirely frescoed by Pietro Antonio Torri and Pietro Ricchi in 1674.

To the right of the entrance are two canvases by Pietro della Vecchia depicting Theft of the body of St. Mark and The Saracens refuse to inspect the basket with the body of St. Mark, made as cartoons for mosaic decoration of St. Mark's Basilica. These are followed by a St. Louis consecrated bishop of Toulouse (Louis of Toulouse) attributed to Pietro Damini. Further along the right wall and in the presbytery are three large works by Giambattista Tiepolo, in order: Christ Reaching the Calvary, the Coronation of Thorns, and the Flagellation.

To the left of the entrance are small 15th-century tempera panels by Lazzaro Bastiani, depicting stories of Old Testament. These were originally on the organ case of Santa Maria delle Vergini, which was suppressed in 1806. It also contains a Portrait of a priest (1420) by Jacobello del Fiore. The first altar to the left has three statues attributed to Gianmaria Morlaiter. The last altar to the left has an Annunciation and Saints Augustine and Alvise by followers of Bonifacio de' Pitati. On the left wall of the presbytery is a Christ in the Garden by Angelo Trevisani.

The adjacent convent is occupied by the Canossian Daughters of Charity.

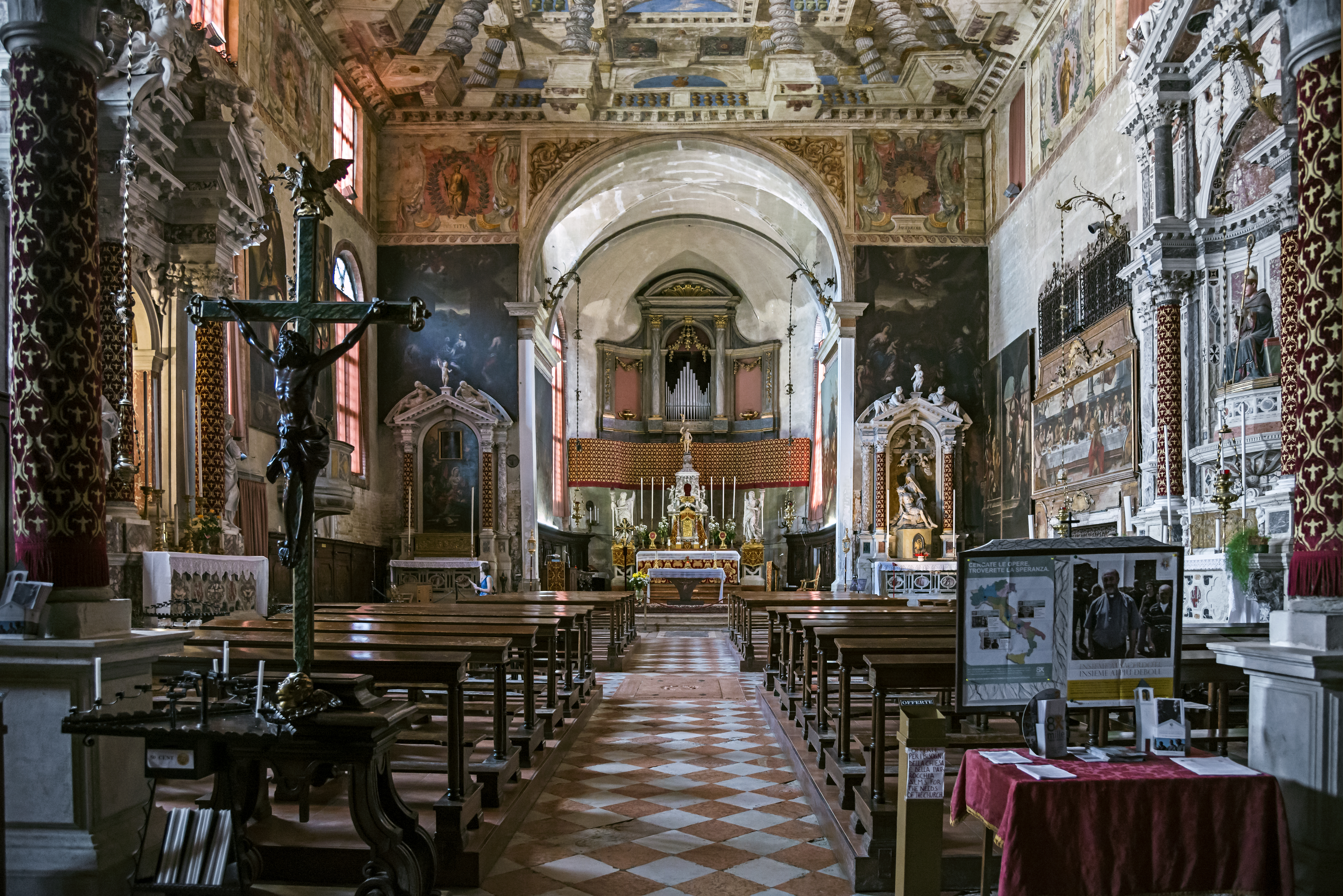
View of the nave

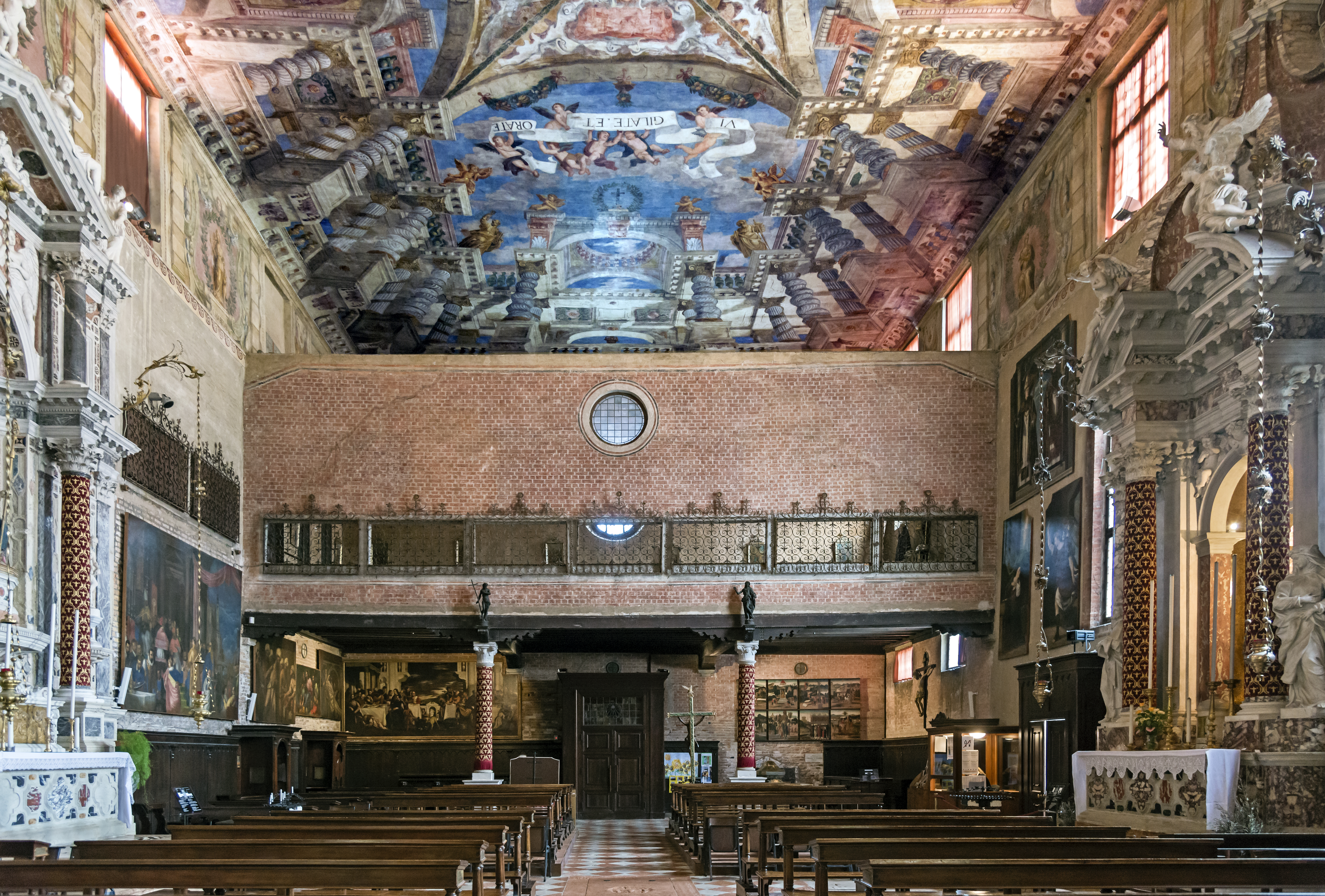
The Barco

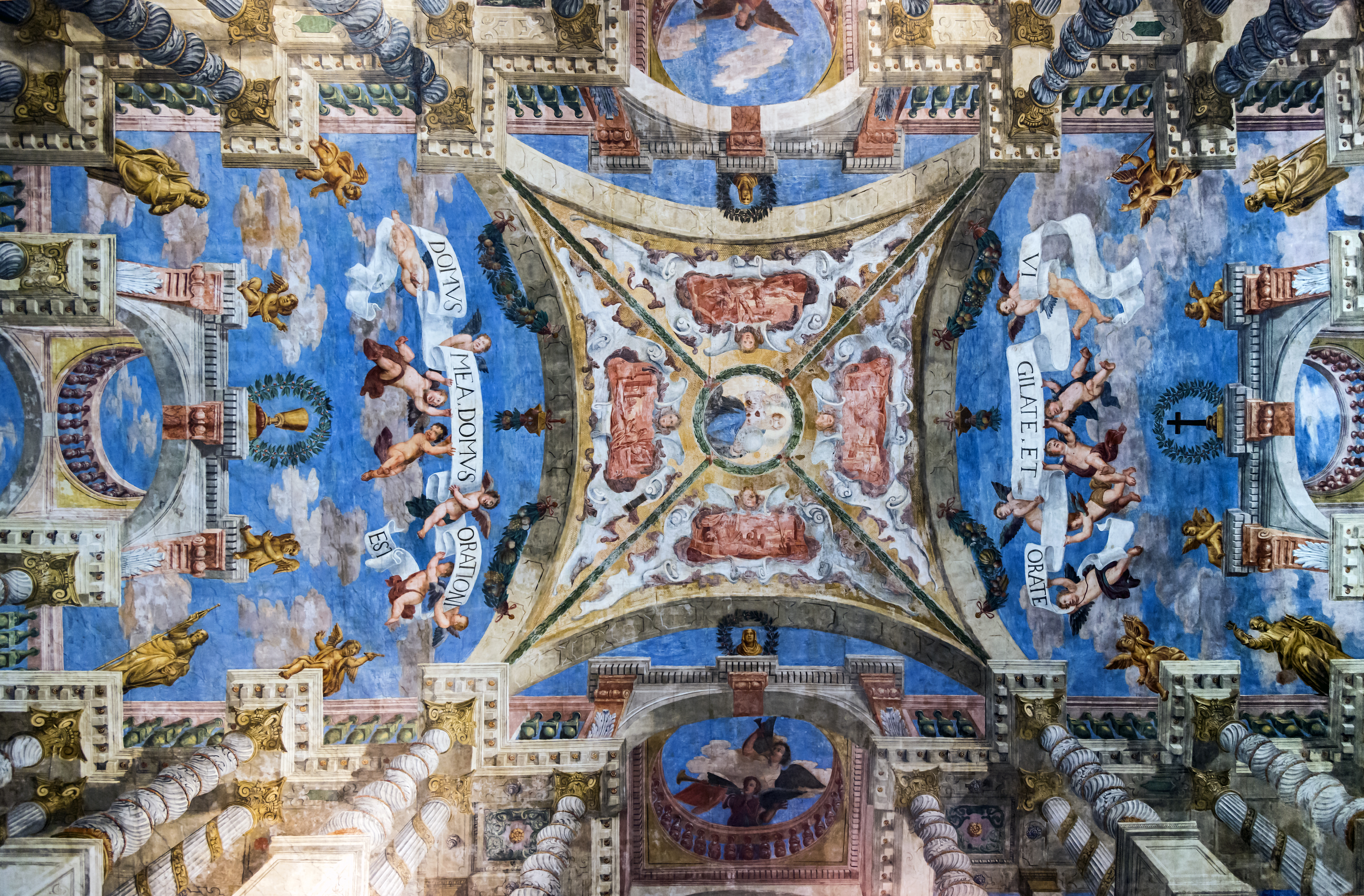
Heavenly Jerusalem by Pietro Antonio Torri and Pietro Ricchi

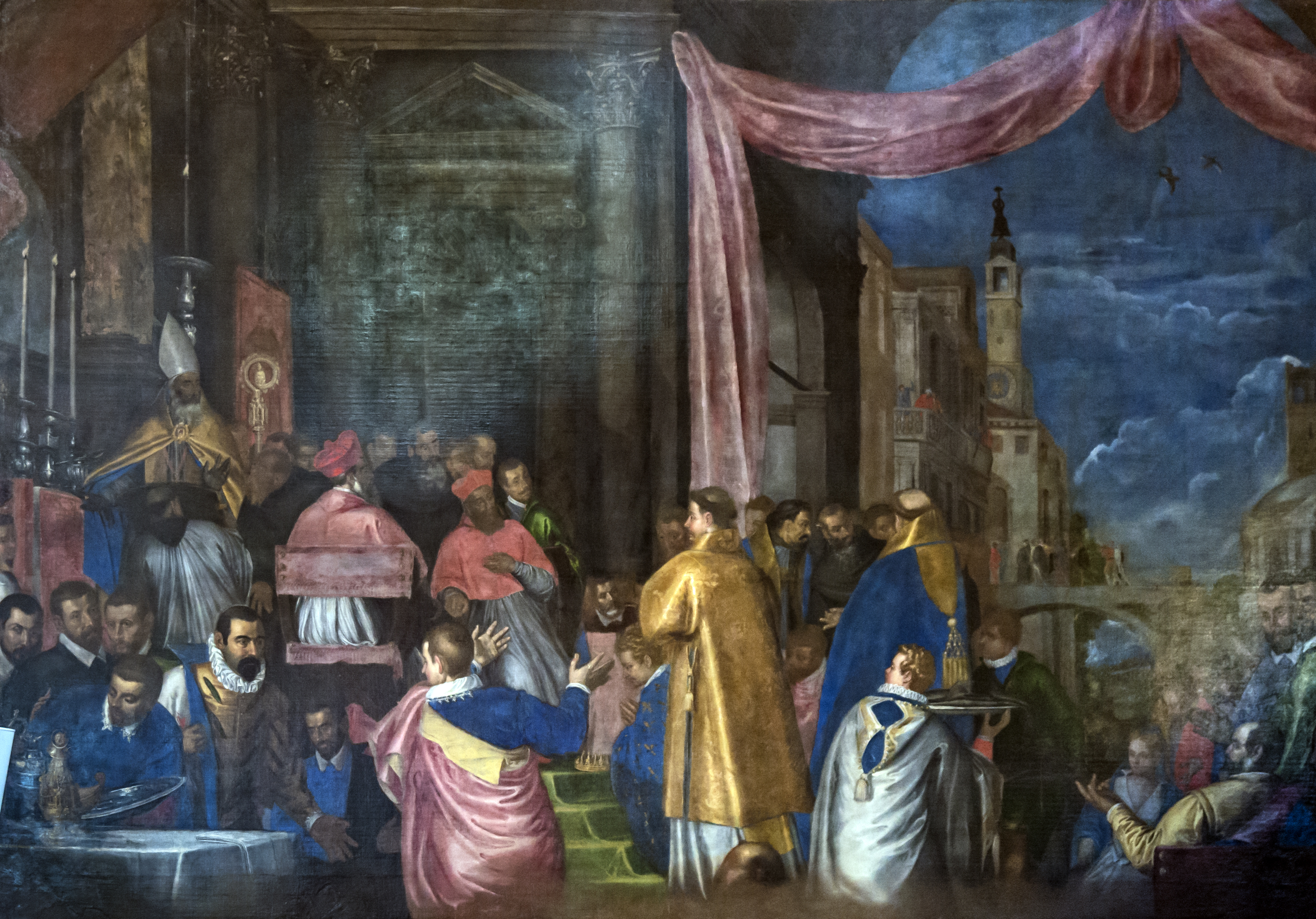
Saint Louis, sacred, bishop of Toulouse by Pietro Damini

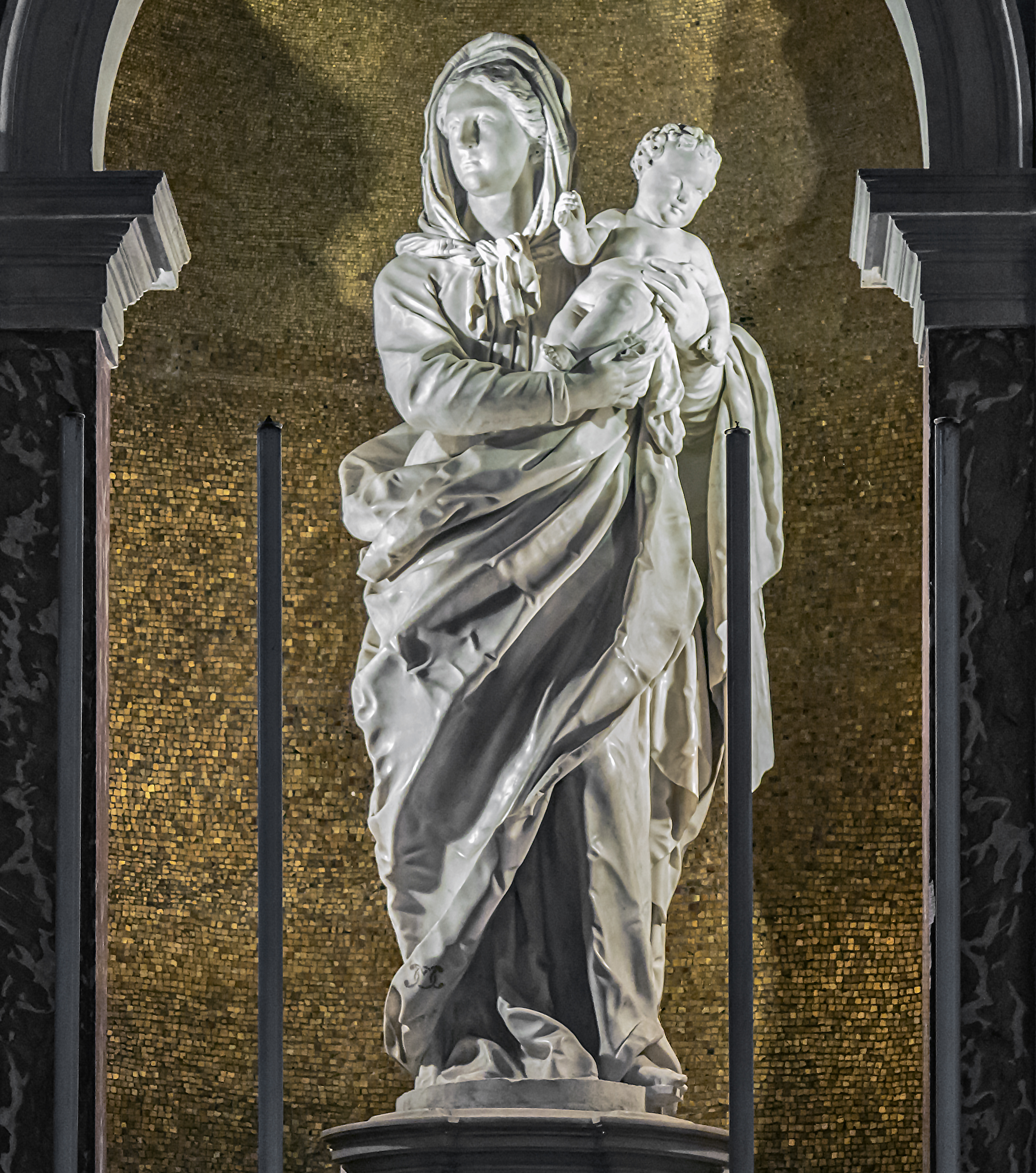
Madonna of the Rosary by Giovanni Maria Morlaiter

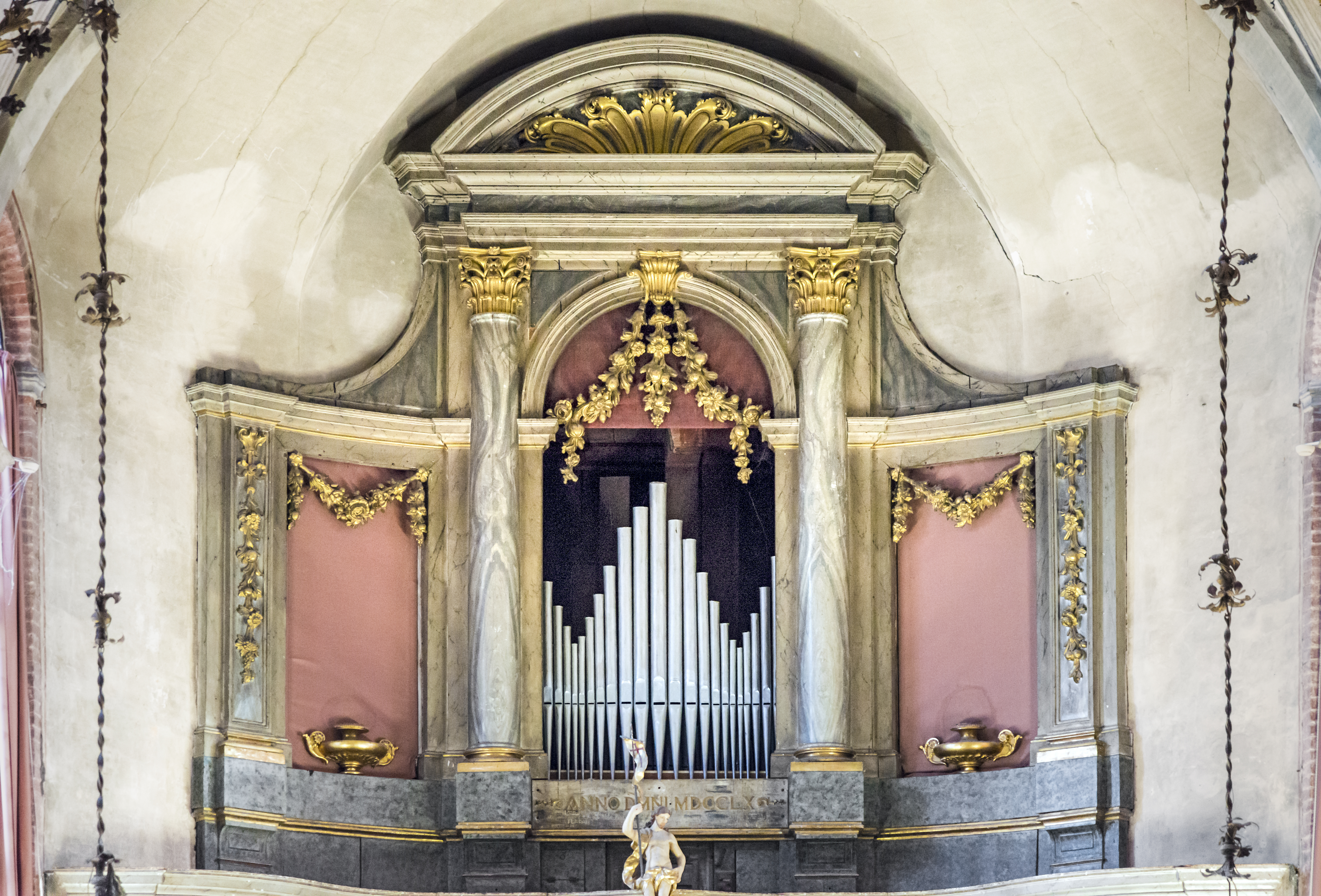
The organ

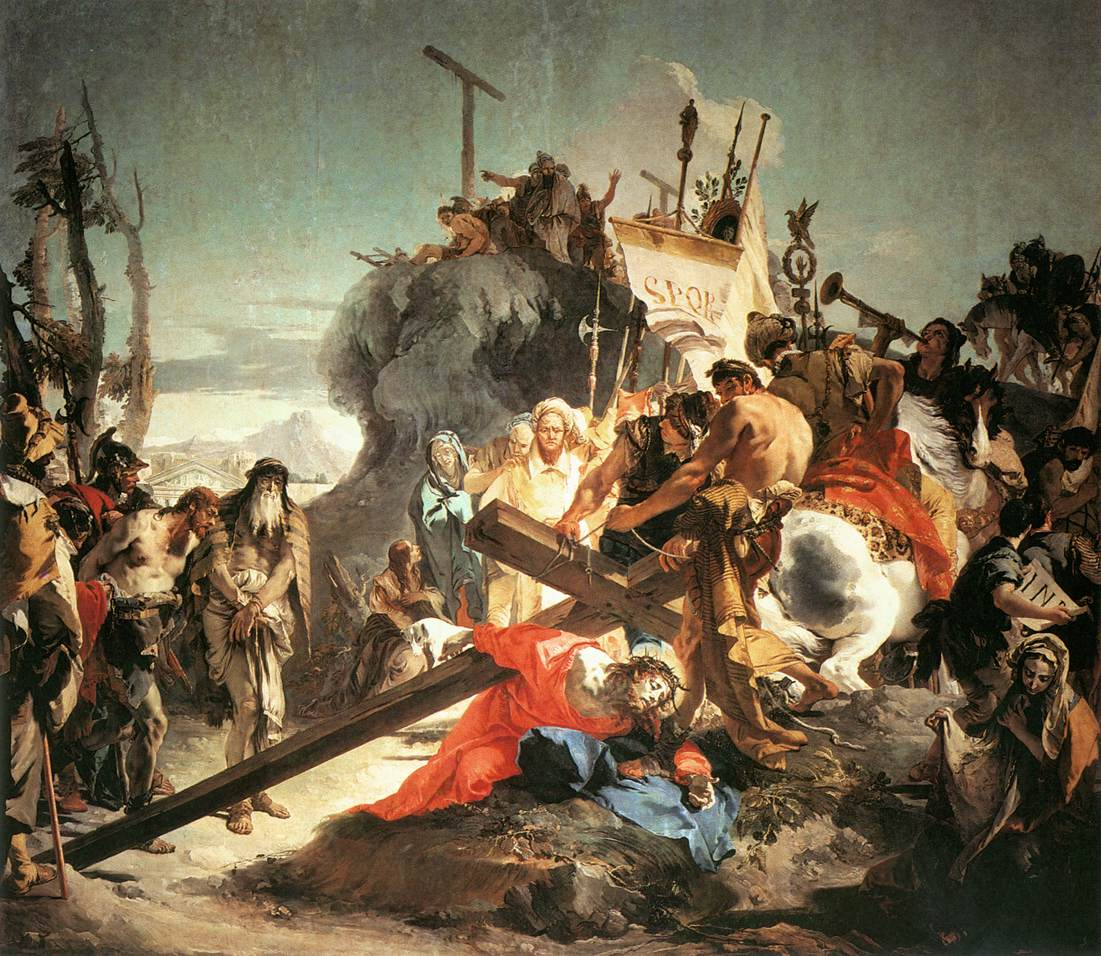
Tiepolo, Christ Carrying the Cross
