= Torre dell'Orologio, Padua =

Clock tower in Italy

Coordinates: 45.40765°N 11.87267°E

Torre dell'Orologio is a clock tower located in the Piazza (Plaza) Dei Signori and positioned between the Palazzo (Palace) del Capitanio and the Palazzo dei Camerlenghi in Padua, or Padova, Italy. It is also referred to as the astronomical clock of Padua.

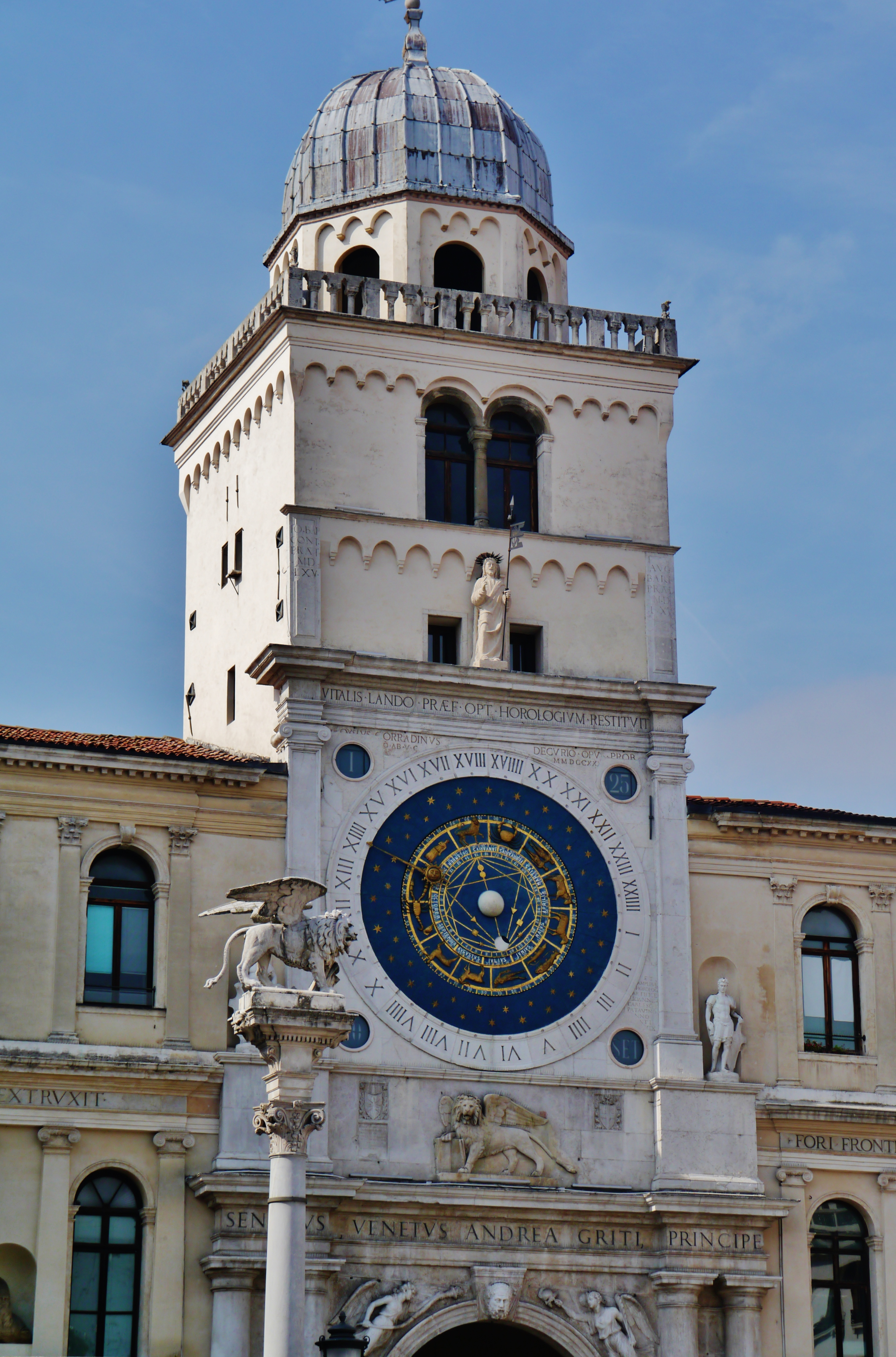

The tower's construction began in 1426 and finished around 1430. The tower was a commission from Prince Ubertino de Carrara, who was part of the Carraresi clan of Padua, Italy, he was the Lord of Padua from 1338 to 1345. It would later be enlarged to accommodate the new clock that was created in 1427. The clock itself was completed in 1434. Later in 1436, ornamentation was added to the dial of the clock, and a year later the clock tower was inaugurated. At the base of the tower, the great triumphal arch, designed by Giovanni Maria Falconetto, was added in 1531.

The design and construction of the clock was overseen by Giovanni Dondi dell'Orologio, also known as Giovanni de' Dondi, who was an Italian physician, astronomer and mechanical engineer from Italy. Dondi was assisted by Gian Petro Dalle Caldiere. The clock has references to the zodiac throughout its design. However, on the original clock, the Libra sign was not present, as with the pre-Roman system Scorpio and Libra were one Zodiac sign.

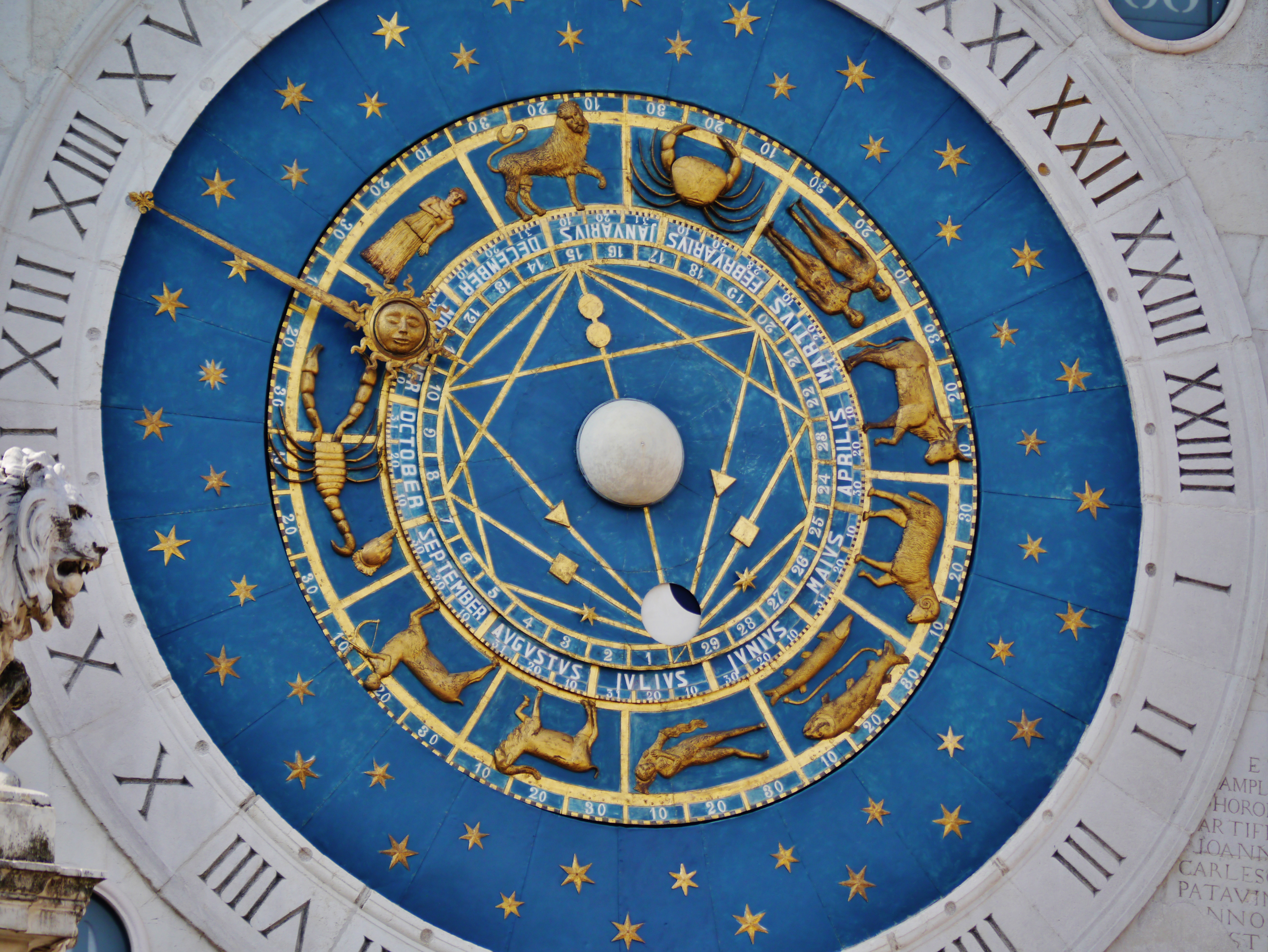
The clock's dial depicts the Earth in the middle, the phases of the Moon, days, months. and the signs of the zodiac.

Today, the clock is open to the public. A group of volunteers called the Salvalarte ensures that sites like this one are open to the public. This group is a branch of the nationwide environmental association.

== See also ==
- 16th-century Western domes
