= Pietro Damini =

Italian painter

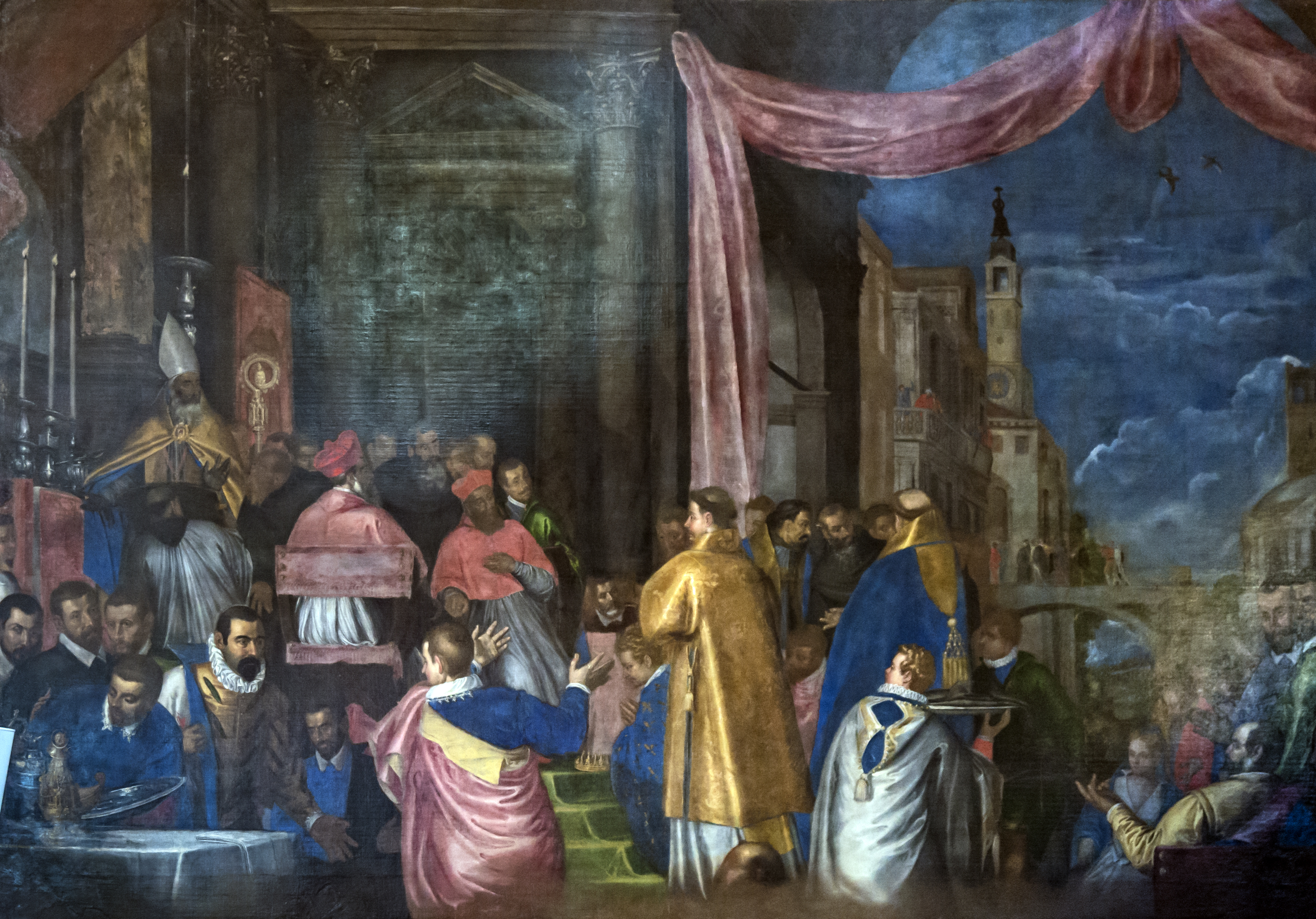
Saint Louis, sacred, bishop of Toulouse Sant'Alvise

Pietro Damini (1592–1631) was an Italian painter of the late-Renaissance period. He was born in Castelfranco Veneto and active in Venice.

He was the pupil of the painter Giovanni Battista Novelli. He painted Christ giving keys to Peter for San Clemente in Padua. He painted a Crucifixion for the Basilica of St Anthony in Padua. He also painted an image of Saint Prosdocimus.
