= Piazza dei Signori, Padua =

City square in Padua, Italy

Coordinates: 45.407677°N 11.873476°E

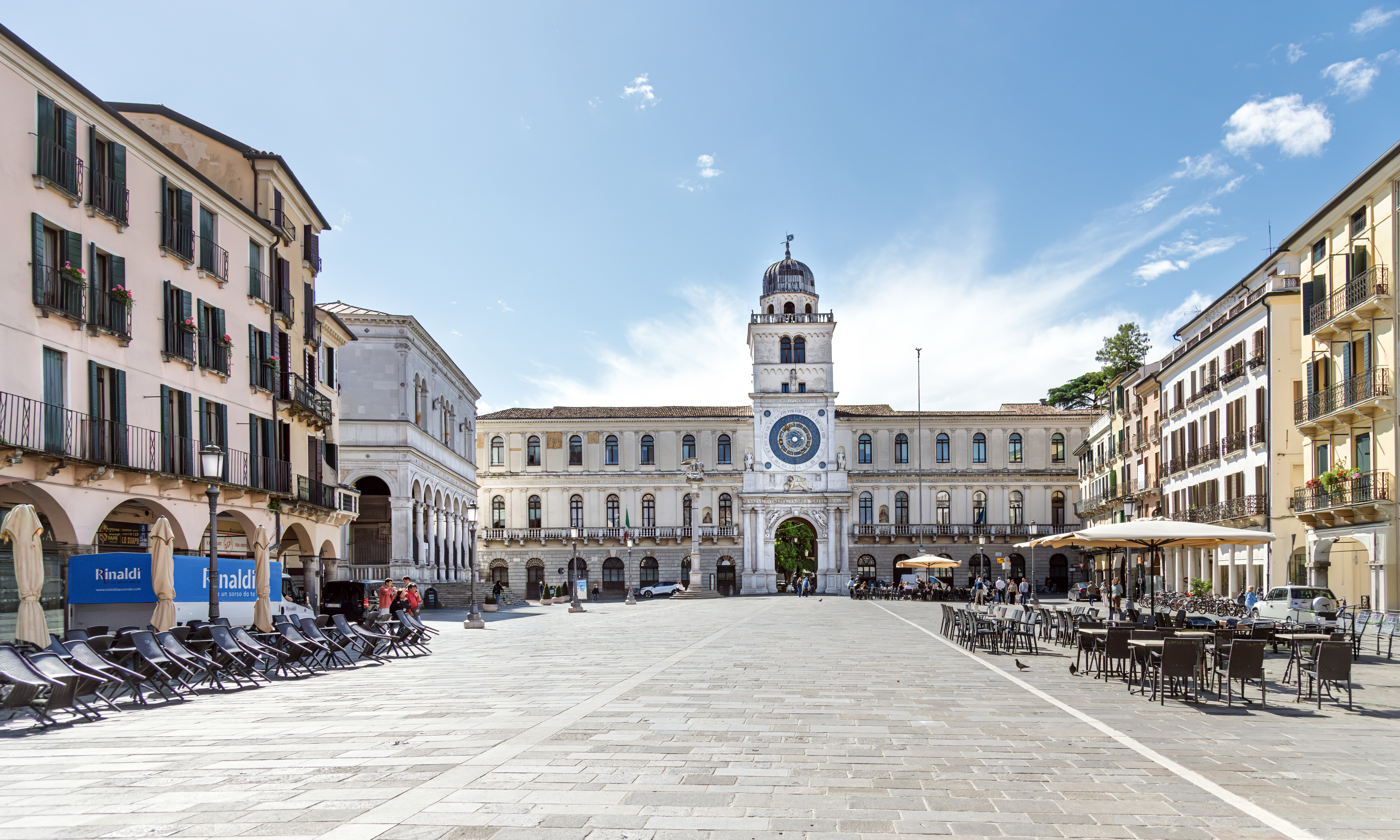
Piazza dei Signori

Piazza dei Signori is a city square in Padua, region of Veneto, Italy. This piazza for centuries hosted official civic and government celebrations, while the larger squares of Piazza delle Erbe (herbs) and Piazza della Frutta (fruits) hosted commerce and public festive celebrations. The square is dominated by the famous Clock Tower.

== History ==
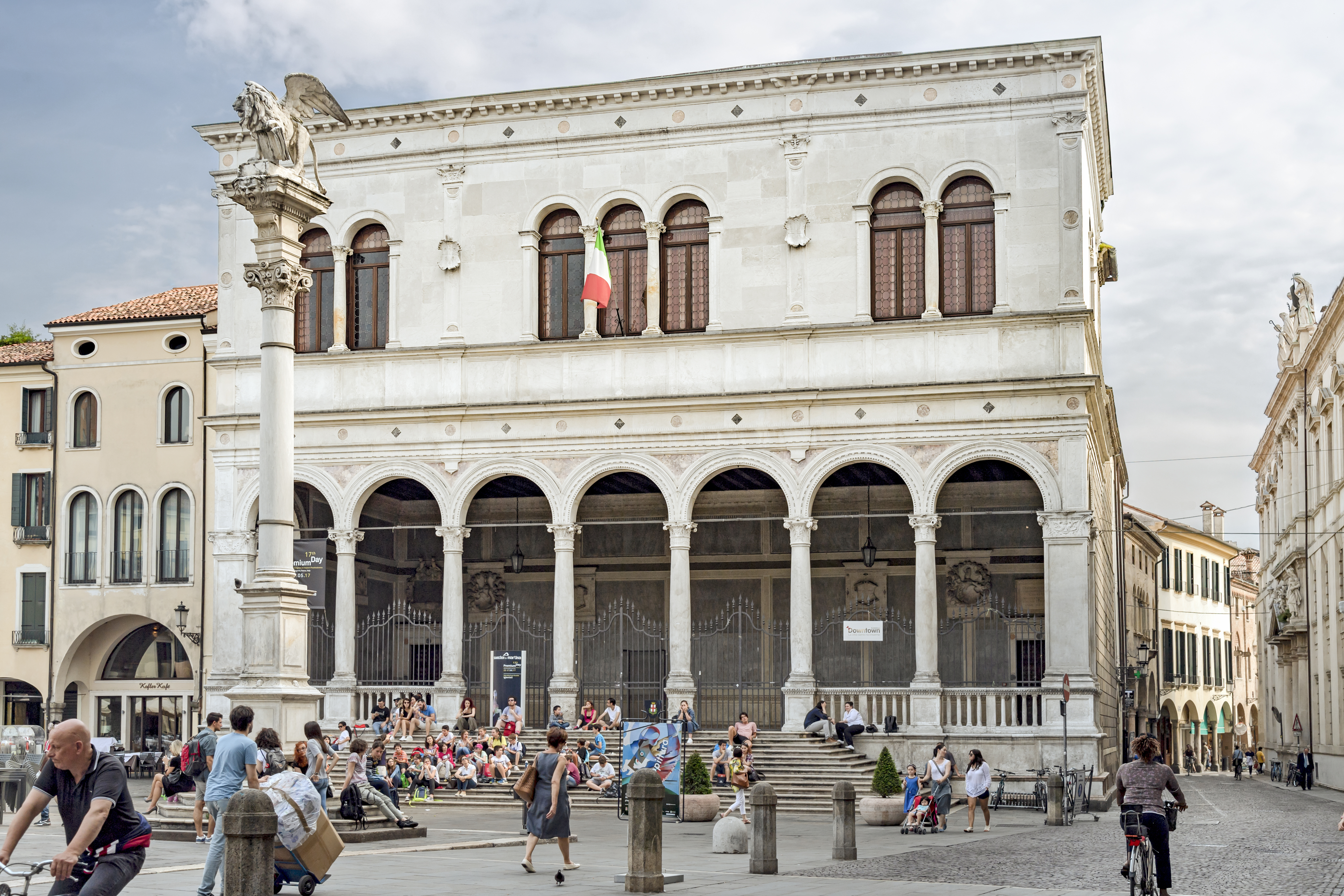
Loggia of Gran Guardia and column Marciana

The square arose in the fourteenth century with the demolition of an old district that stretched in front of the church of San Clemente, promoted by Ubertino from Carrara. The square was designed to give importance to the tower and access to Palace on the east side, that he was building. It became the scene of tournaments and courtship. According to tradition it was from the noblemen or signori Carrara that the square took its name.

The 14-century war between the Carrara and the Visconti damaged the square and surroundings buildings and is called the period "of Desolation". The arrival of Venetians rule restored the square as the fifth main civic area: for tournament play, the rides, the battles, the courtship, concerts and music festivals. Initially known as the "Square of Triumphs" and again "Piazza della Signoria". At parties for the patrons and official visitors the area was designed with the ephemeral architecture. On Shrove Tuesday a bull hunt was held. July 17 was the celebration to commemorate the reconquest of Padua in 1509. On May 9, 1848, the priest Alexander Gavazzi renamed the square, "Piazza Pius IX", to underscore anti-Austrian sentiment. It became "Piazza Unità d'Italy" after unification (1870) and then returned to the original name in the fascist era.

The medieval square was paved with brick laid in a herring-bone pattern, this was replaced in the eighteenth century by slabs of Euganean trachyte. Until 1785, there was a monumental well at the entrance to the square (now Via Nazario Sauro). It was adorned with marble columns and cannonballs. The well was sealed in 1785 as being unsightly. The real was then used to refine the well of Piazza delle Erbe, the rest was all sold with gain of 50 ducats.

The square hosts the morning city market. In the evening, it is a place to relax with an aperitivo.

== Description ==
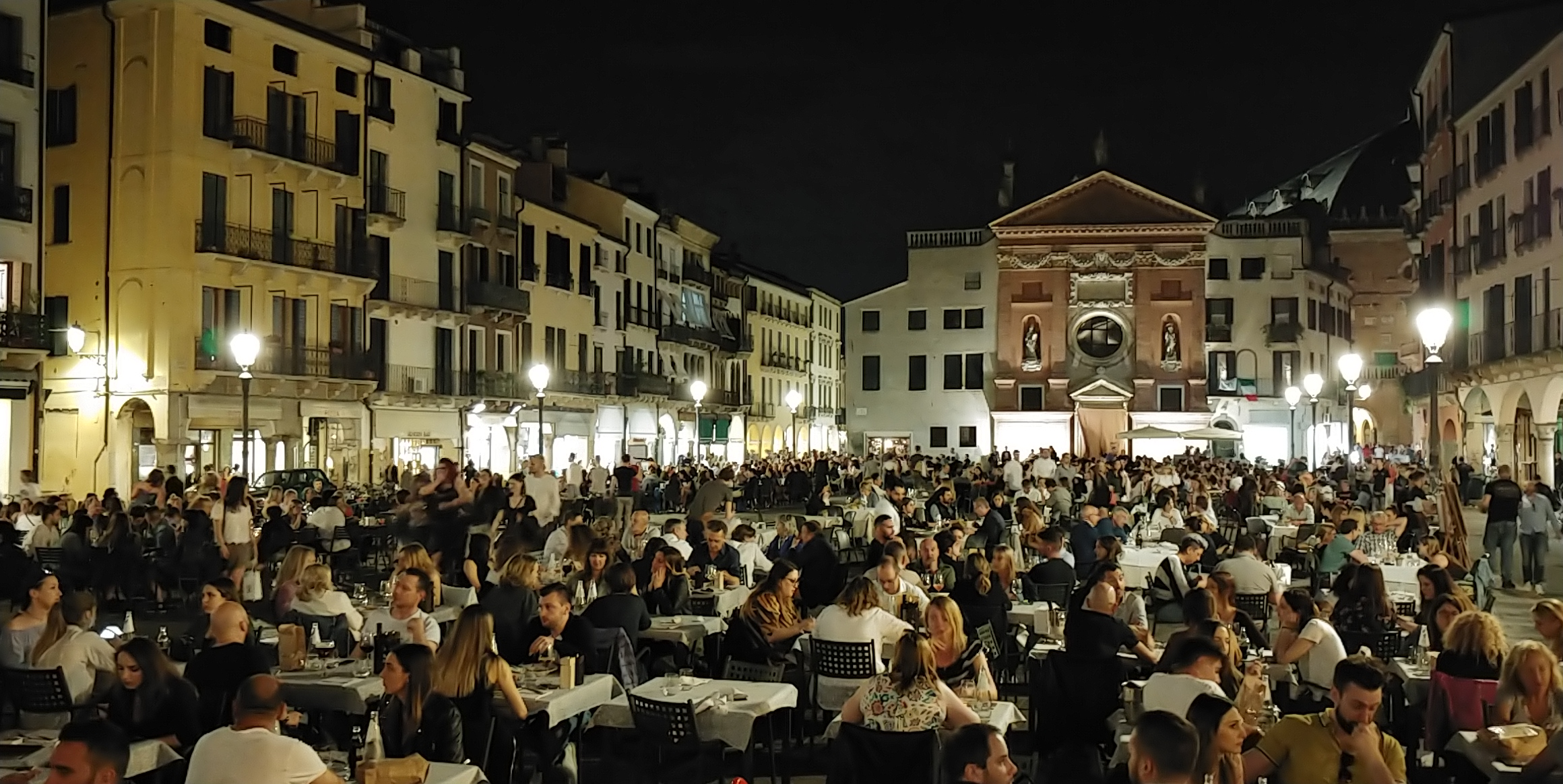
View of the San Clemente

At the west end, the piazza is dominated by the Clock Tower, flanked by symmetrical buildings of Capitanio and Camerlenghi, buildings from the sixteenth and seventeenth centuries in mannerist style. Two niches, hold the busts of Saint Prosdocimus and St. Anthony. Both are of Nanto stone and were walled up during the anticlerical period of the Napoleonic occupation. They were restored in the 1990s.

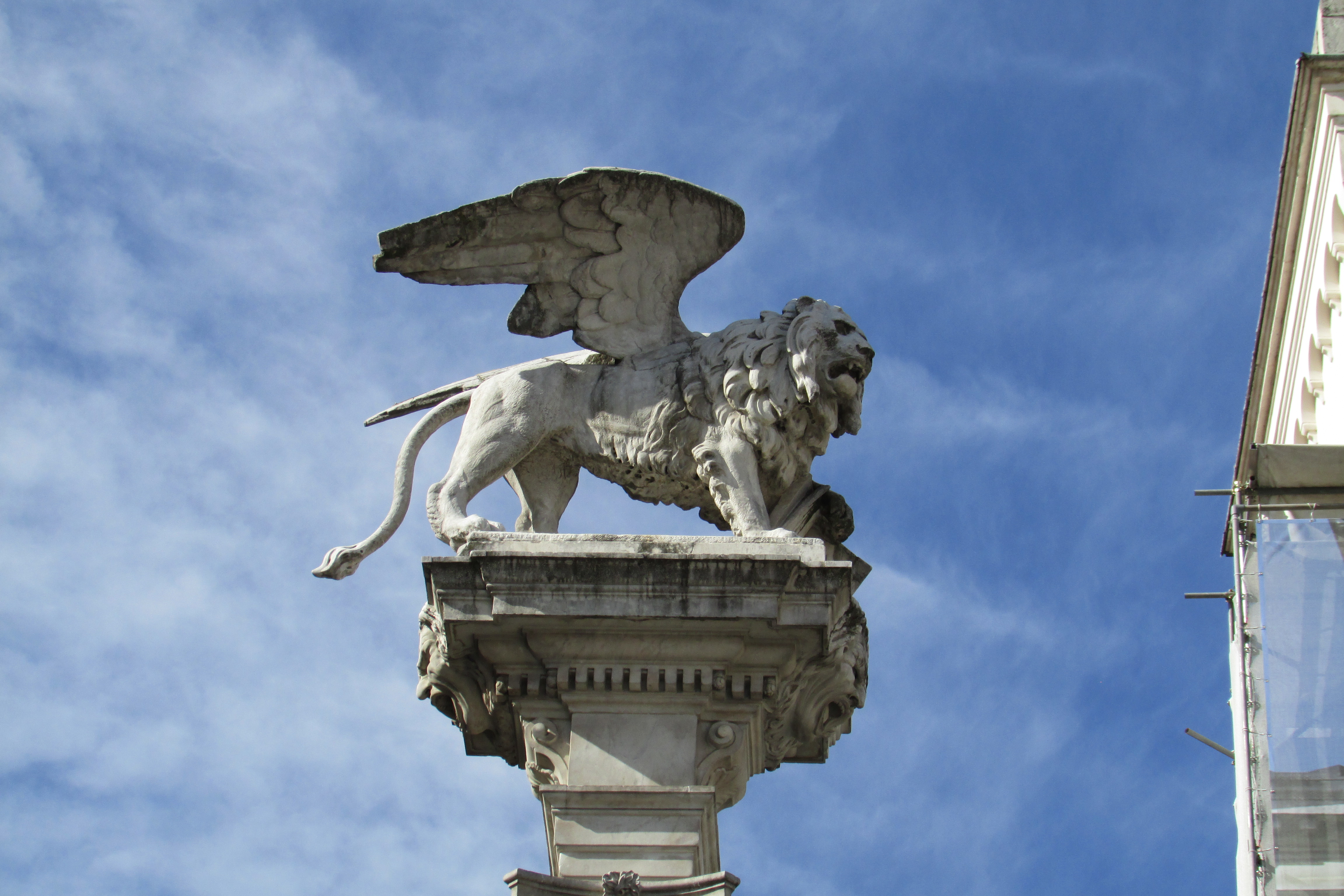
Winged Lion of St. Mark, a symbol of Venetian Republic in the Piazza dei Signori

On the square to the left column Marciana (mid-eighteenth century,) is a monument composed of pieces from the church of San Marco. This includes the marble column and capital of the Roman era. which were found in 1764. The lion is the work (1870) Christmas Sanavio to replace the one destroyed by French troops in 1797. The flag flagpole has a marble base dating back to the sixteenth century with decorations in high relief. The marble panels on all four sides represent the cardinal virtues. It has stood here from the second half of the eighteenth century.

To the east is the ancient church of San Clemente flanked by medieval houses.

On the right it is placed a plaque commemorating the "serious and heinous crime committed by several cops", that occurred on February 15, 1722, against university students; the culprits were "condemned to the gallows of the gallows, the jail and the dark prison" as it reported in the slab.

'Concerns over the beautiful square, which is called the Signoria. This has stone floor cooked, serves for the theater of public shows of rides, and tournaments and is surrounded by towering factories and beautiful houses" (Angelo Portenari, Of Happiness of Padua, 1623)

== Buildings around the square ==
- San Clemente, Padua
- Torre dell'Orologio, Padua
