= San Clemente, Padua =

Church in Padua, Italy

Church of San Clemente
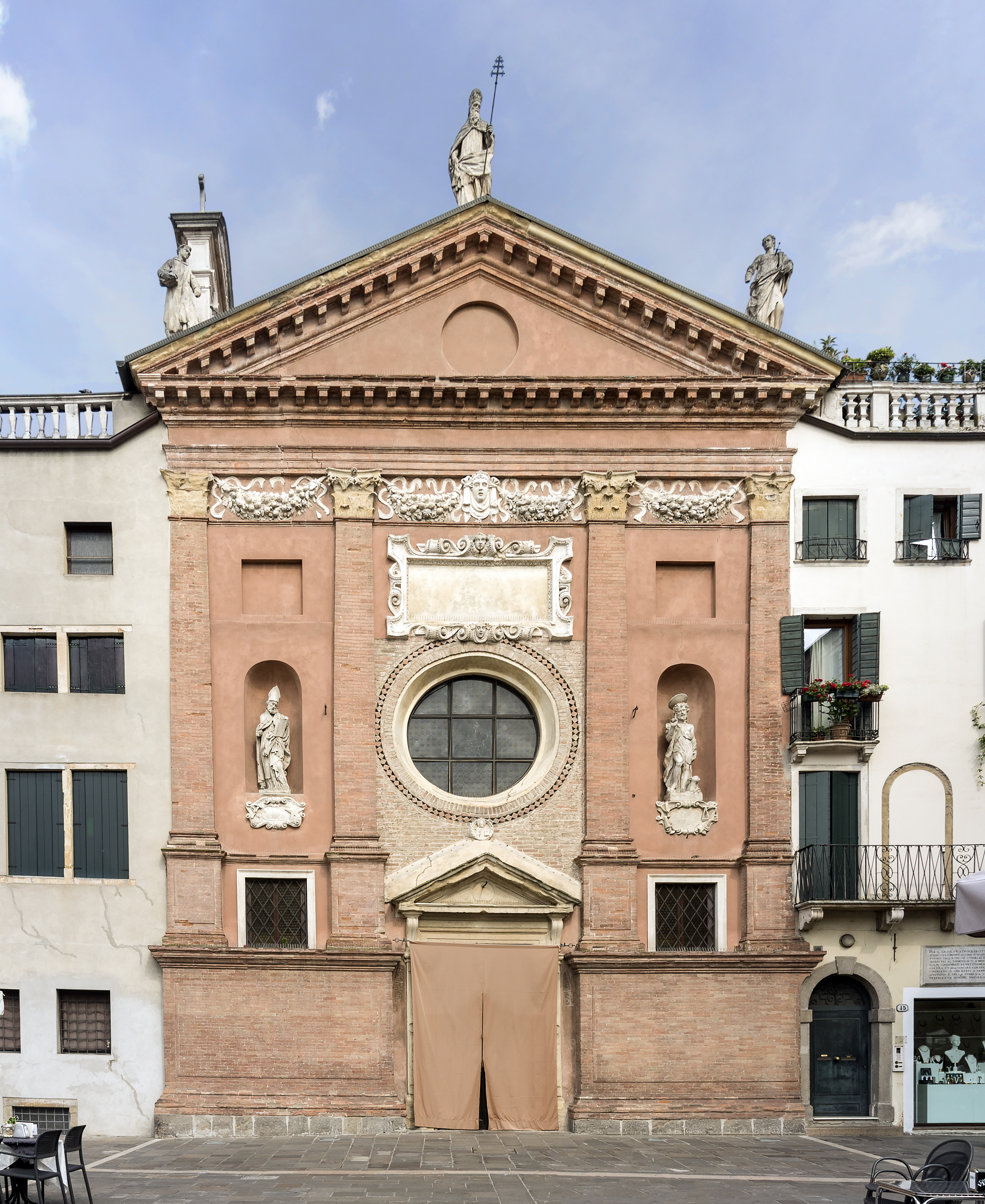
- Church facade on the Piazza dei Signori

Religion
- Affiliation: Christian
- Province: Diocese of Padua
- Rite: Roman
- Leadership: Pope Clement I

Location
- Location: Veneto, Italy
- Interactive map of Church of San Clemente
- Coordinates: 45°24′27.36″N 11°52′27.01″E

Architecture
- Type: Church
- Style: Mannerist
- Groundbreaking: 11th Century
- Completed: 18th Century

San Clemente, or St Clement, is a Baroque-style Roman Catholic church that overlooks the Piazza dei Signori in Padua, Italy. It is currently a dependent of the Cathedral Basilica of Santa Maria Assunta.

== History ==
Tradition holds that the church was founded in the fifth century by the Paduan townspeople who had gone on to establish a community in what were then the islands of Rivoalto (Rialto) and Dorsoduro, and now form part of Venice. The ancient chronicler Guglielmo Ongarello claimed that the then Doge Andrea Dandolo, in gratitude for that immigrant community having built the churches of San Giacomo di Rialto and San Raffaele, among others, they were allowed to patronize the construction of this church in Padua.

The earliest documentary citation of the church was from 1190, when it was elevated to a parish. Since 1386, the church commemorated the victory at the Battle of Castagnaro of forces including men under Francesco Novello da Carrara over the armies of Antonio della Scala.

With its proximity to the nearby market places, the church gained commissions for private altars and restoration work. The building was substantially altered starting in the sixteenth century, during the work of reorganization of the square outside. Further refurbishments took place in the following two centuries.

== Exterior ==
The building is surrounded by home and commercial buildings. Only the façade facing the piazza is visible. It is in three parts, divided by pilasters topped by Corinthian capitals. The columns support a pediment topped by statues of St Clement, St Giustina and St Daniel. The tympanum of the portal is surmounted by a large rose window surrounded by terracotta decoration from the 7th and 8th centuries. A round high relief from the fourteenth century, depicts St Clement. In two niches are the statues of St. John the Baptist, and Sant'Alò, dated 1696. A neo-baroque belfry rises, next to the church. A dome covering the bell tower was demolished in the second half of the nineteenth century.

== Interior ==
The nave is a vaulted hall with a small square apse.

The first altar on the right depicts Jesus granting the keys of the church to St Peter by Pietro Damini. On the nave wall is a large canvas depicting a Sermon of St John the Baptist by Francesco Zanella. The main altarpiece depicts Pope Clement I (St Clement) surrounded by angels (1782) by Luca Ferrari from Reggio. Other paintings inside the church are by Giovanni Battista Bissoni, Giovanni Battista Rossi, Giulio Cirello.

The altar of St Anthony of Padua, was provided by the "fratelea casolinorum" (Brotherhood of the grocers). The bas-relief depicts John the Baptist with the tools of the trade of grocers. The statue of St Anthony has replaced a painting of St Charles Borromeo painted by Pietro Malombra, which has been restored. Near the entrance there is a fresco attributed to Jacopo Bellini. Titian Minium, a famous Paduan sculptor, is buried in the church.

== Pipe organ ==
The 18th century choir is located in the counterfacade. Inside a rococo wooden balcony is the pipe organ, built in the early twentieth century by Domenico Malvestio probably reusing the phonic material of the previous organ, perhaps century. The tool is completely closed in case of expression and transmission system with mixed mechanical manual and pedal, tire logs, has a single keyboard of 54 notes and a pedal straight to 27. The barrels are completely closed by cash expressive except some belonging to the register Principale 8 '.
