= Piazza delle Erbe, Padua =

Square in the historic center of Padua

Coordinates: 45°24′25″N 11°52′30″E

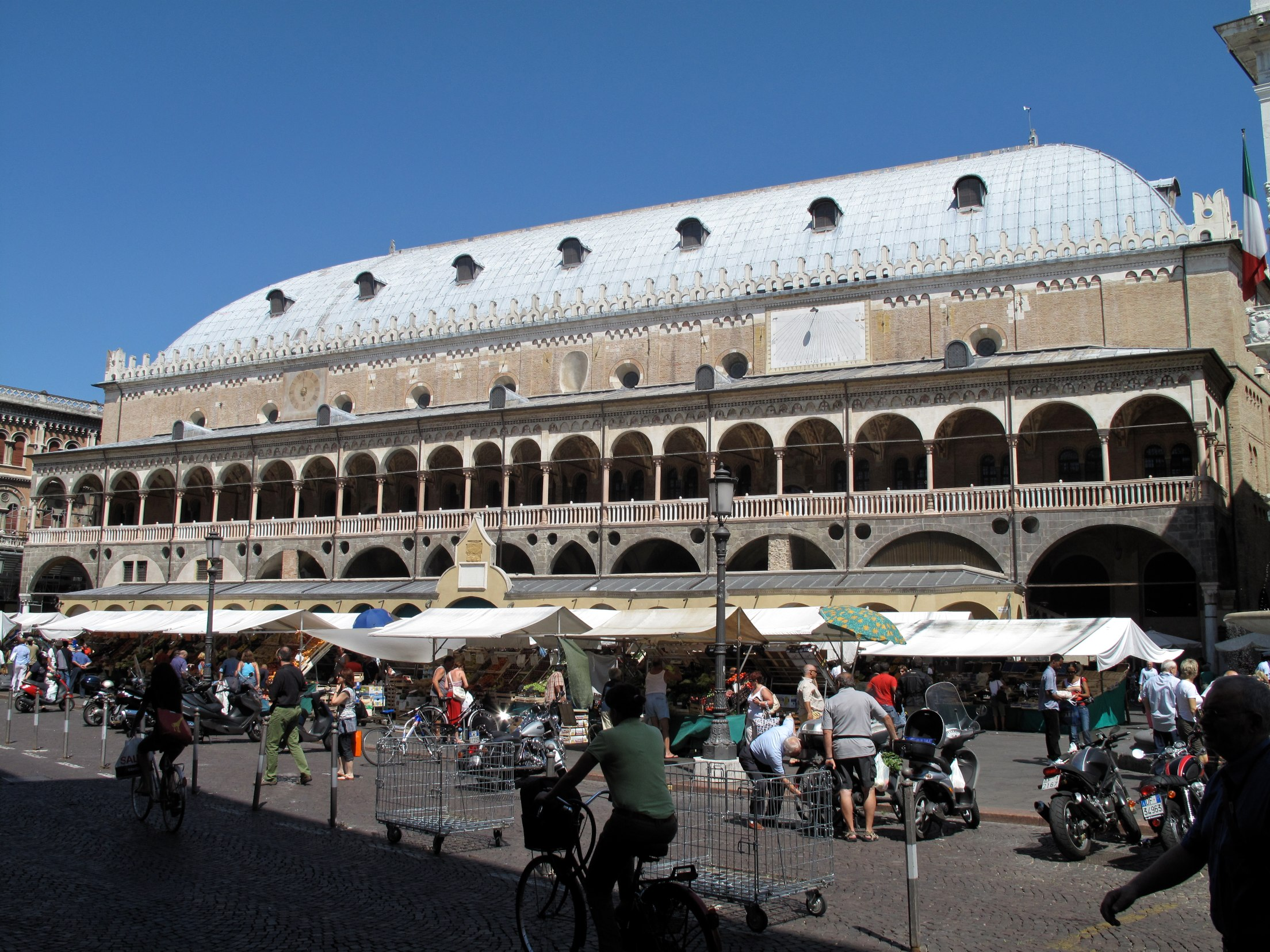
Market in Piazza delle Erbe and Palazzo della Ragione

Piazza delle Erbe is one of the many squares in the historic center of Padua. For centuries, with Piazza della Frutta, it was the commercial center of the city. In the two squares is one of the largest markets in Italy. Unlike Piazza dei Signori, the civic theater of celebrations, Piazza delle Erbe was the site of the folk festivities. The square is dominated by the imposing Palazzo della Ragione.

== History ==
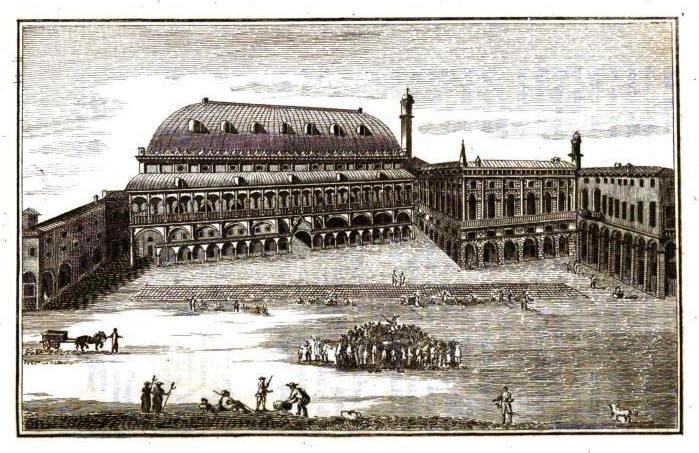
Piazza Erbe, Padua, on 1817

The area was active in pre-Roman times. By the time of Imperial Rome, homes gave way to businesses. Its present design is from the tenth and eleventh centuries. The space was occupied by a number of shops and stalls selling all kinds of goods, from the edible to luxury goods. With the construction of the Palazzo della Ragione in the early thirteenth century that areas were assigned to specific types of goods. In the hall sellers of fabrics and furs. At the foot of the staircases around the building were the awnings for iron (Scala del Feri, to the east) and wine (Scala del Vin, to the west) and sellers of grain and leather.

Under the Palazzo del Podesta were the workshops of goldsmiths. In 1302 they expanded the space with the demolition of a warehouse, which is now the fountain. The square took the shape that it now has. as you see it now, especially with the prominent location of the Palazzo del Podesta. In the eighteenth century the medieval houses on the southside were standardized with the porches. In 1874, the Palace of Debite replace the prisons on the west.

In the square, under the Palazzo del Podesta was an ancient well. In August 1785 it was covered with the well structure that had been in the Piazza dei Signori, when that well was sealed. This well was sealed under a manhole – visible on the pavement – in 1930, when it was built the current monumental fountain. The square, paved in the Middle Ages, was paved in several occasions during the eighteenth century and dramatically in 1867.

On the day of St. James, the square hosts the Palio Race "Ludi Carrara", first started by citizens in 1382 [1] to celebrate the lordship Carrara and commemorate the rise to power of James I of Carrara, which occurred 28 June 1318, the feast day of St. James. The rider who first arrived in the square – party race from Voltabarozzo – would win the pallium, a precious piece of silk fabric, while the second goose youth, the third an owl.

== Executions ==
The square was the scene of executions since the Middle Ages, with Piazza Castello. It has been called 'Justice Square' and a statue of Justice with sword and scales is placed above the Tower of Elders. The stage for the executions was under the windows of the Palazzo del Podesta. Here were also lodges the Palace of Reason and the scale of Feri – or Justice. There is a second statue of Justice here. The condemned were tended to by the confraternity of the Scuola di San Giovanni.

Some historical executions:

- On 13 January 1374 Alvise Forzatè and his son Philip were beheaded on charges of treason.
- In 1387 Albertino From Peraga was publicly beheaded on poggiuolo of the building towards the square of corn for having sided with Gian Galeazzo Visconti.
- In 1615 Giulio from Naples, convicted of theft committed sacrilege in Anguillara, was taken on a cart from the Palazzo della Ragione to Porta Santa Croce where they cut off his right hand. Returned to the square with the severed hand around his neck, he was hanged and burned.

== Description ==
The square has an irregular trapezoidal shape. In the morning of each business day the square hosts the fruit and vegetable market. In the afternoon, numerous bars occupy the space with chairs and tables and are occupied by Padua and tourists to the ritual of animating the square until late evening. On the west is the Palace of Debite and the entrance of the ancient contrà Beccherie (now via Manin) running towards Piazza Duomo. To the east is the Moschini and the entrance to the Contra Škocjan and the Canton del Gallo. Past the medieval houses on the south, the square leads to the ghetto streets of Fabbri (once called Ebrerie) and the ancient road of Caneve (now Via Squarcione) where there were many wine to good. On the north stands the monumental Palazzo della Ragione with numerous lodges and the sixteenth century Palazzo del Podesta.

An engraving nearby the square made by municipal authorities in 1277 reveals ancient Paduan units of measurement—the "copo" and "staro" for the measure of flour and grains, the "quarelo" for the measure brick, and the "brazzo" or "brazzolaro" (arm), which was used to measure the fabric. These standards allowed for a strict control of the quantities and measures of the goods that the traders exchanged in the Piazza delle Erbe and the Piazza della Frutta.

== See also ==
- Piazza dei Signori, Padua
