= Giovanni Dondi dall'Orologio =

Venetian engineer and astronomer (c. 1330–1388)

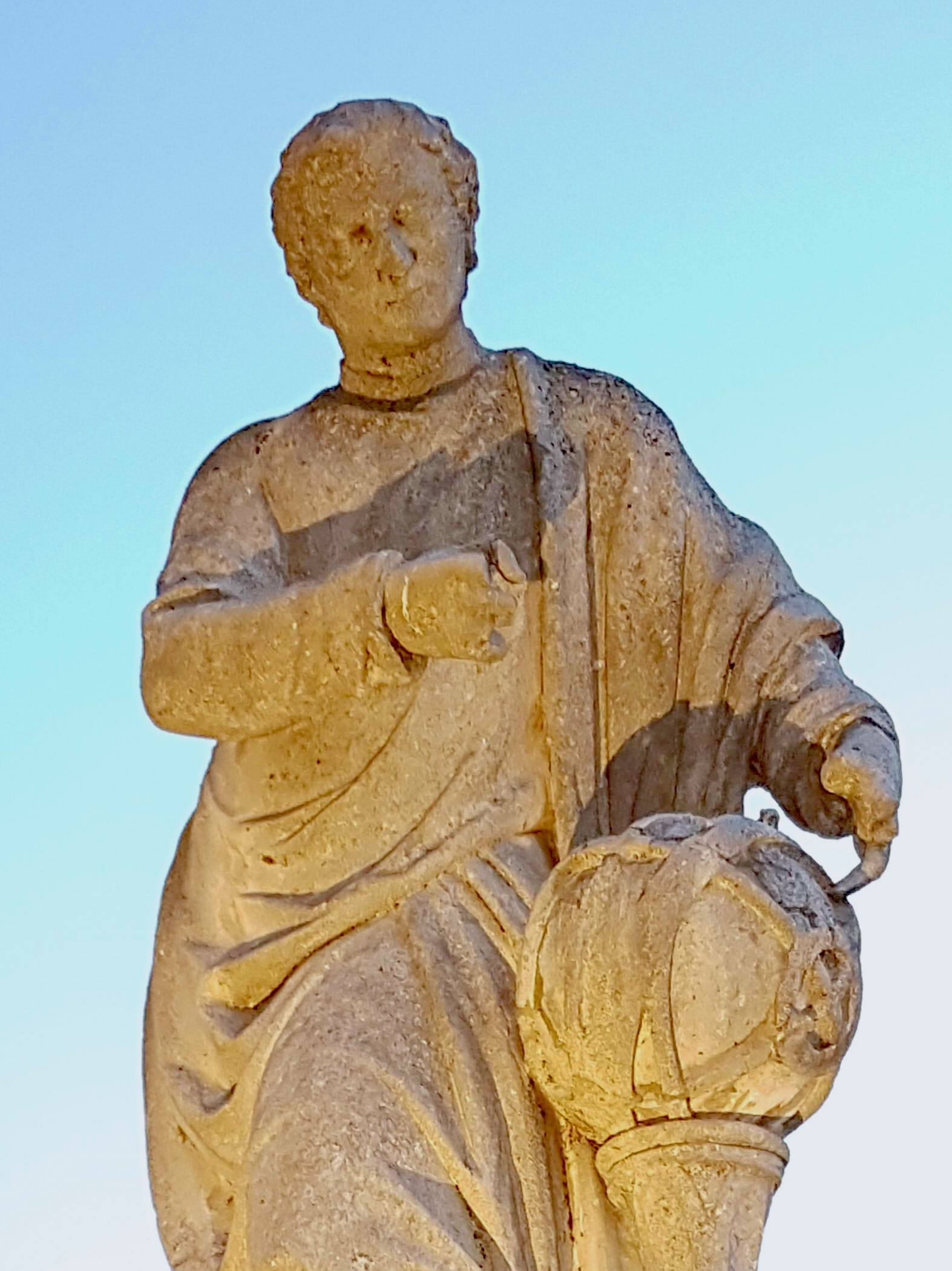
- Statue in the Prato della Valle of Padova
- Born: about 1330; Chioggia, Republic of Venice
- Died: 19 October 1388; Abbiategrasso
- Other name: Giovanni de' Dondi
- Occupations: physician, astronomer, engineer
- Known for: the Astrarium

Giovanni Dondi dall'Orologio (about 1330 – 19 October 1388), also known as Giovanni de' Dondi, was a Venetian physician, astronomer and mechanical engineer in Padua, now in Italy.

He was a pioneer in the art of clock design and construction. The Astrarium, which he designed and built over a period of sixteen years, was a highly complex astronomical clock and planetarium, constructed some sixty years after the first all-mechanical clocks had been built in Europe, and demonstrated an ambitious attempt to describe and model the planetary system with mathematical precision and technological sophistication.

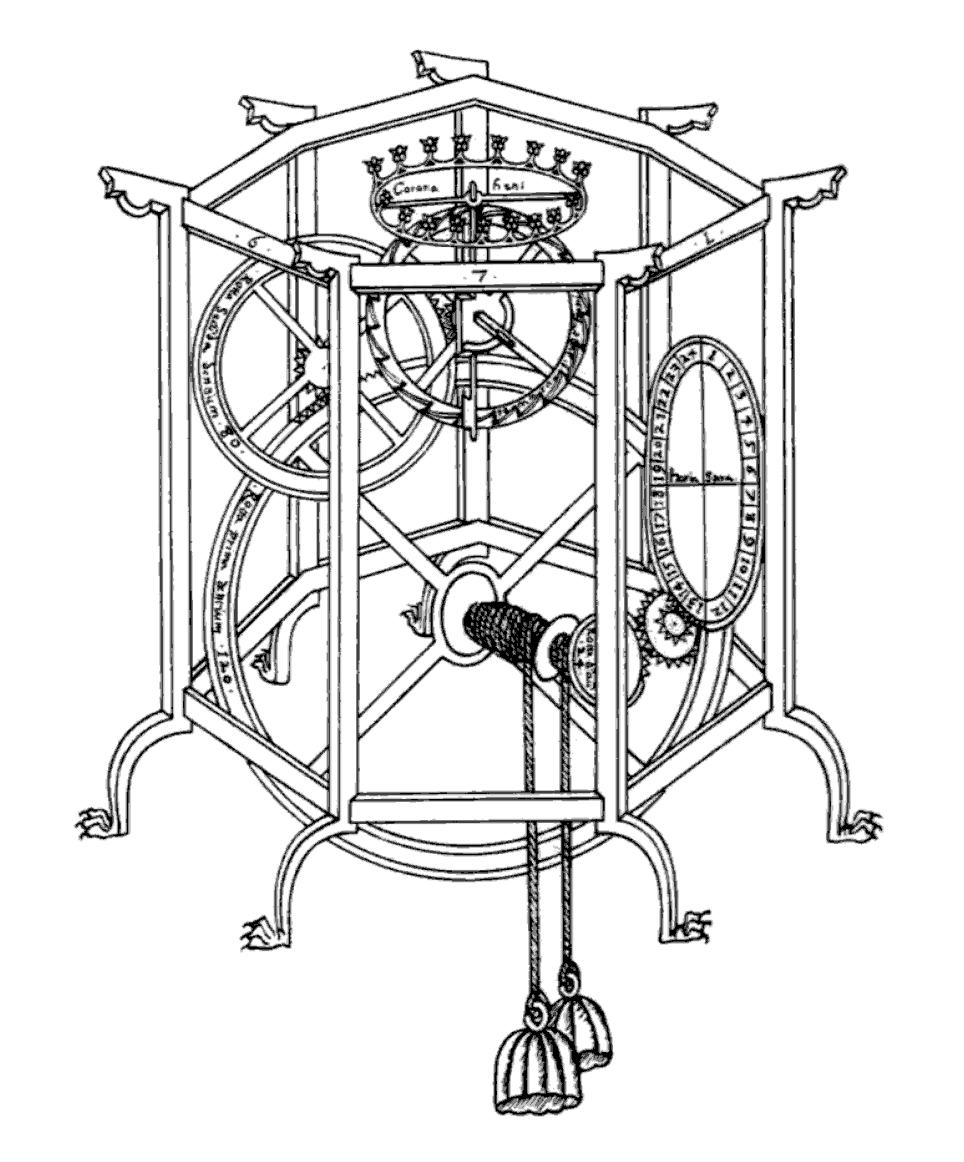
The Astrarium: tracing of an illustration in the Tractatus astrarii showing the weights, escapement and main gear train, but not the complex upper section with its many wheels

== Life ==
Giovanni was the second son of Jacopo Dondi dall'Orologio and Zaccarota Centrago or Centraco of Chioggia, at that time in the Republic of Venice. His father was a doctor and astronomer, and builder of a large astronomical clock in the tower of the Palazzo Capitaniato of Padua in 1344.

Giovanni lived with his father from 1348 to 1359, and shared his father's interest in astronomy and clockmaking. In 1348 he began working on what he called his astrarium or planetarium. He described in detail the design and construction of this project, which was to occupy him until 1364. His manuscripts provided enough material for modern clockmakers to build reconstructions. In 1371 he served as ambassador to Venice, but after the conflict between Padua and Venice in 1372, joined the University of Pavia, and served as diplomat and scholar until his death in Abbiategrasso on 19 October 1388. He is buried at Sant'Eustorgio in Milan.

=== Giovanni Dondi and the Padovana chicken ===
It is frequently reported, in sources from the nineteenth and early twentieth centuries to the present, that the "Marquis Giovanni Dondi dell'Orologio" was responsible for introducing the Padovana breed of chicken – which closely resembles the Polish – from Poland to Italy. However the Dondi who was ennobled was the soldier Francesco Dondi, created Marquis by King John III Sobieski in 1676; no journey to or contact with Poland by Giovanni Dondi in the fourteenth century is documented.

== Written works ==
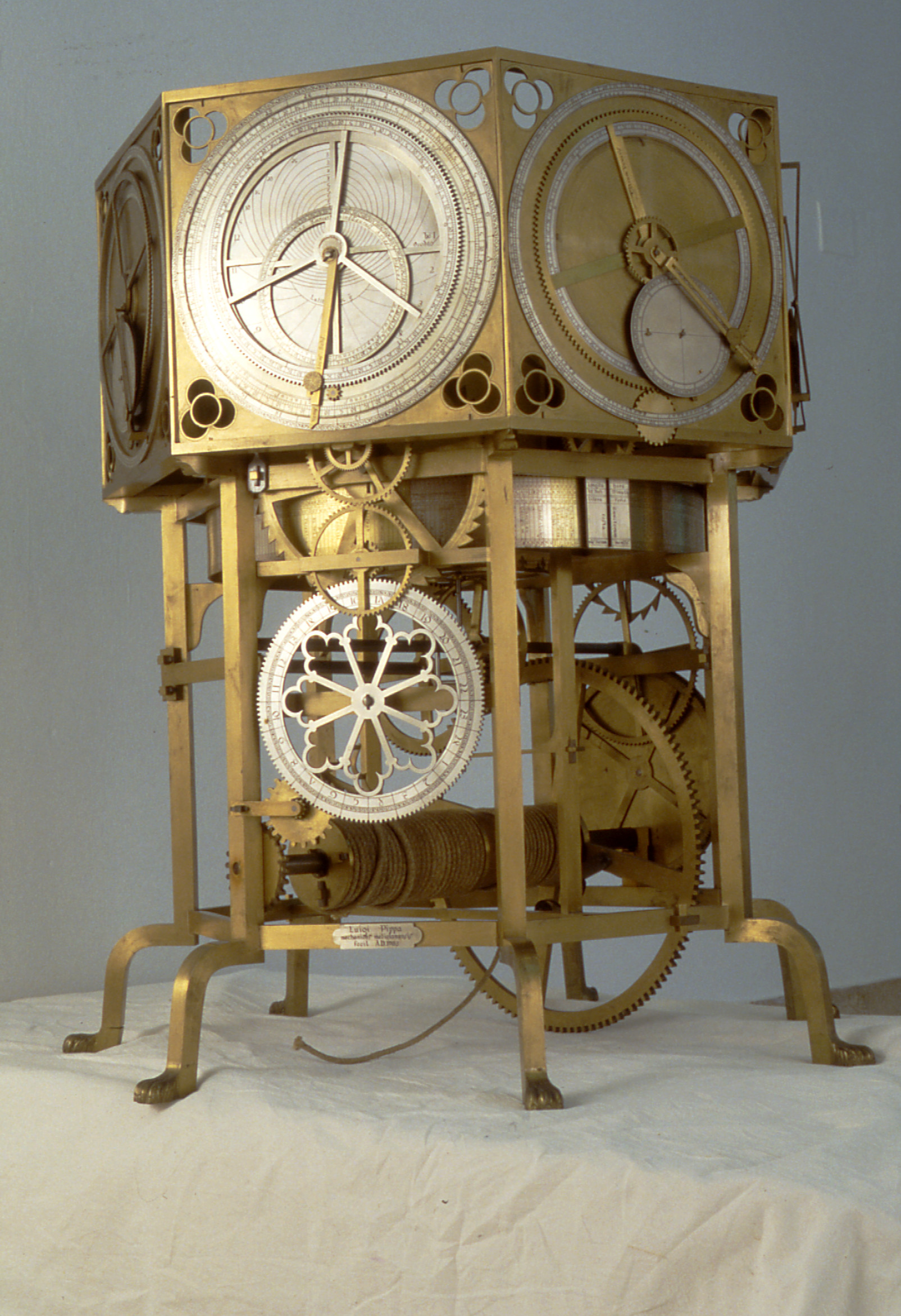
Modern reconstruction of the Astrarium, Museo Nazionale Scienza e Tecnologia Leonardo da Vinci, Milan

Dondi wrote on a wide range of subjects. His most celebrated work is the Tractatus astrarii or Planetarium, which describes the Astrarium. It is one of the earliest surviving descriptions of its kind, predated by only a few years by the Albion and Horologium of Richard of Wallingford. In the introduction, Dondi writes that his machine was built in accordance with the thirteenth-century Theorica planetarum of Campano di Novara, and to demonstrate the validity of the descriptions of the motion of heavenly bodies of Aristotle and Avicenna. The Tractatus survives in twelve manuscript sources. The autograph in the Biblioteca Capitolare di Padova (MS. D39) and a copy of it, also in Padua, are certainly the work of Dondi. The other sources are rewritten versions of the autograph, to which Dondi's contribution is as yet unclear. The autograph manuscript was published in 1987 in a critical edition with colour facsimile and French translation by Poulle as the first volume of the Opera omnia of Jacopo and Giovanni Dondi.

Of the twenty-nine lectures on medical topics, the Sermones and Colationes, delivered between 1356 and 1388, only the titles survive, with the exception of one, the Sermo in conventu magistri Iohannis ab Aquila in medicina 1367 (Bibliothèque Nationale, Paris, Lat. 9637), and some passages from that in Bologna in the same year cited by Francesco Scipione Dondi dall'Orologio.

The twenty-four Quaestiones super libris Tegni, dating from about 1356, are preserved in a manuscript begun in 1370 by Tommaso da Crema and now in the Biblioteca Palatina of Parma (Parmense 1065); Tegne was the mediaeval name for the summary by Galenus of the works of Hippocrates. The Quaestiones are to date unpublished, as are Dondi's Experimenta or medical prescriptions, conserved in a manuscript of Iohannes de Livonia dated 1453 and now in the Biblioteca Civica di Padova (C.M. 172).

Another lost work, a tractatulum Galieni occultam seriem explicantem in distinctione dispositionum corporum humanorum, quorum in libro Microtegni sub brevitate restrinxit reales differentias inter illas, preterquani in paucis assignatum, was probably written at Pavia during the plague of 1383, and may have discussed the De complexionibus of Galenus.

The short practical treatise on the avoidance of plague, De modo vivendi tempore pestilentiali, was written shortly afterwards; it was published, in Italian, by Zambrini in 1866, and by Sudhoff in 1911.

In natural science, Dondi wrote De fontibus calidis agri Patavini, dedicated to his friend Iacopino da Angarano, and preserved in autograph manuscript in the Biblioteca del Seminario of Padua (ms. 358) and in a copy in the Biblioteca Ambrosiana in Milan (H 107 sup.). Together with the Tractatus de causa salsedinis aquarum et modo conficiendi sal artificiale ex aquis Thermalibus Euganeis by his father Jacopo, it was published by Tommaso Giunti in De balneis omnia quae extant apud Graecos, Latinos et Arabas in 1553.

A manuscript in the Biblioteca Nazionale Marciana (Ms. lat. XIV 223 (4340)), though not in Dondi's hand, contains both his own literary work and selections copied from that of others. It contains his Iter Romanum, which describes the Roman monuments of Rimini and Rome in a scientific manner, with measurements and transcriptions of inscriptions, and was published by Rossi in 1888; his Epistolario of twenty-eight letters, of which the two to Petrarch have attracted particular attention; and his Rime, consisting of forty-two sonnets, five madrigals and three ballate, published by Medin in 1895 and Daniele in 1990. Musical settings for two of the ballate survive: a setting by Bartolino da Padova of La sacrosanta carità d'amore, a copy of which was sent to the poet-minstrel Francesco di Vannozzo; and a setting ofOmay çascun se doglia.

Dondi's quaedani apostillae or notes on a letter of Seneca, mentioned in a manuscript of Gasparino Barzizza from 1411, have not been traced.

== The Astrarium ==
The astrarium was considered to be a marvel of its day. Giovanni Manzini of Pavia writes (in 1388) that it is a work "full of artifice, worked on and perfected by your hands and carved with a skill never attained by the expert hand of any craftsman. I conclude that there was never invented an artifice so excellent and marvelous and of such genius".

Dondi writes that he obtained the idea of an astrarium from the Theorica planetarum of Giovanni Campano da Novara, who describes the construction of the equatorium.

The astrarium was primarily a clockwork equatorium with astrolabe and calendar dials, and indicators for the Sun, Moon, and planets. It provided a continuous display of the major elements of the Solar System and of the legal, religious, and civil calendars of the day. Dondi's intention was that it would help people's understanding of astronomical and astrological concepts. Astrology was then considered a subject worthy of study by the intellectual elite and was taken reasonably seriously.

In 1381 Dondi presented his clock to the Duke Gian Galeazzo Visconti, who installed it in the library of his castle in Pavia. It remained there until at least 1485. It may have been seen and drawn by Leonardo da Vinci. The final fate of the clock is unknown.
