= Computus clock =

Clock to calculate the date of Easter

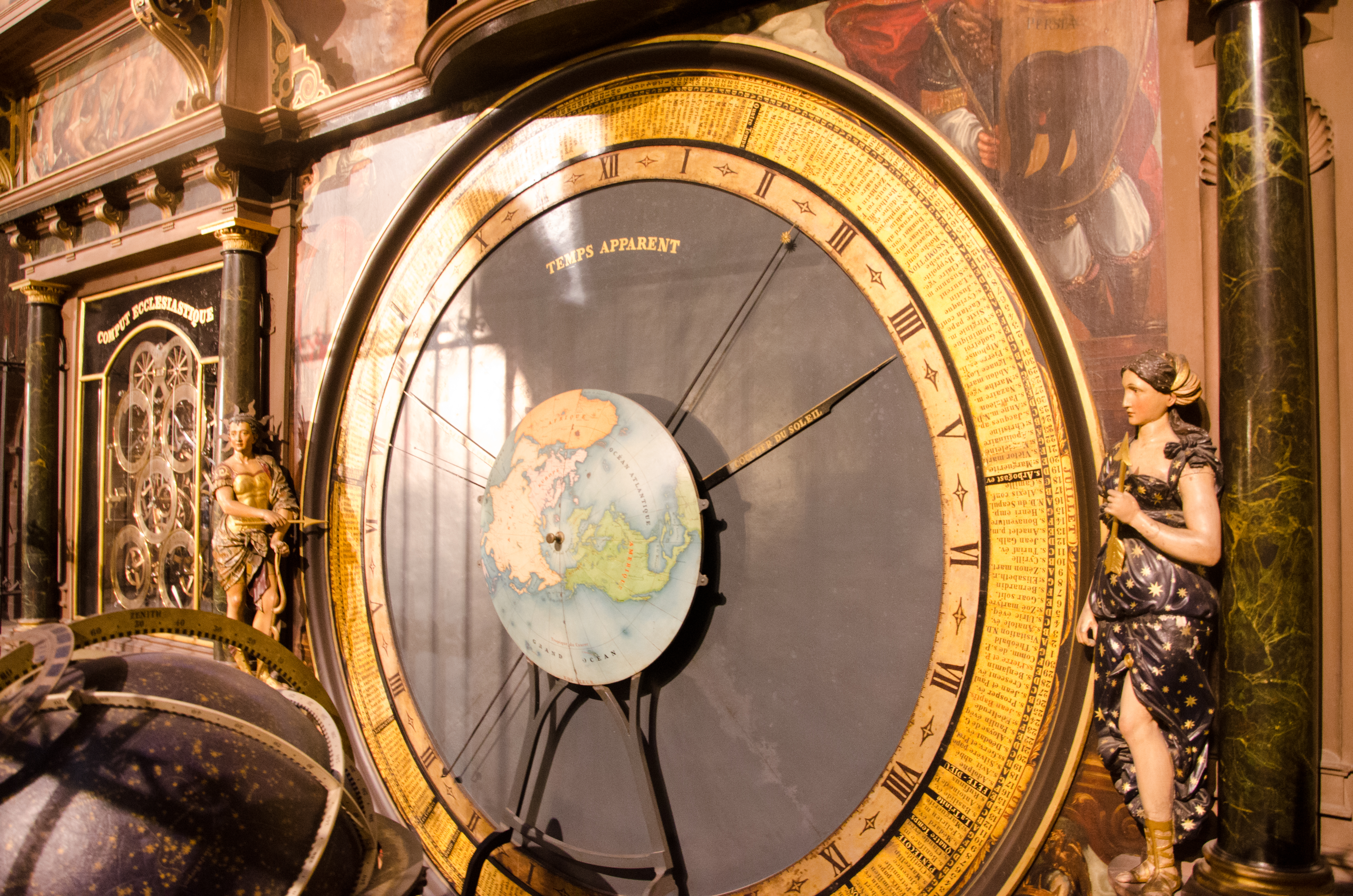
The monumental astronomical computus clock of Strasbourg Cathedral made by Jean-Baptiste Schwilgué. Black markers show the dates of moveable feasts including Easter on the annual calendar ring. Schwilgué's computus is on the left.

A computus clock is a clock equipped with a mechanism that automatically calculates and displays, or helps determine, the date of Easter (and other dependent dates of moveable Church feasts). A computus watch carries out the same function.

== Background ==
The movement of a computus clock provides and/or calculates astronomical and calendar information according to the tradition that Easter Sunday is the first Sunday after the first full moon (Paschal or ecclesiastical full moon) on or after the spring equinox (21 March), and Easter Sunday should not occur on the same day as the Jewish calendar date Nisan 15th, the first day of Passover week. In early Christianity, the Easter date was calculated each year and announced by the Pope. The later need for Christian clergy living in different territories to be able to calculate the Easter date for themselves forced attempts to establish clear rules for the Easter date calculation and finally the algorithms for this.

The determination of the Easter date requires calculating astronomical and calendar cycles – the annual motion of the Sun round the celestial sphere, the evolution of the phases of the Moon, the cycle of the days of the week, particularities of calendars and some agreements like the date of the so-called ecclesiastical equinox., designated as March 21, irrespective of the actual astronomical observation by the Church of Alexandria in the beginning of the 4th Century.

Specific astronomical data which may be incorrect, misinterpreted or location dependent, were eliminated from the Easter date calculation by the invention of special paschal functions – "letters" and "numbers". They include the “golden number” (which gives the dates of all the new moons for the year in a 19-year Metonic cycle), the solar cycle (the 28-year cycle of the Julian calendar and 400-year cycle of the Gregorian calendar with respect to the week), the epact (the age of the Moon in days on a certain date), the dominical letter (used to determine the day of the week for particular dates) and the indiction (the number of a given year in a fifteen-year period). The computations after the Gregorian reform of 1582 should also take into account additional corrections necessary due to particularities of the Gregorian calendar, notably the solar equation (taking into account some non-leap century years) and the lunar equation (for correction of the Metonic cycle)

The term "computus" as the description of the Easter date computation was proposed in 725 by the English Benedictine monk Bede in his treatise “De temporum ratione” (“The Reckoning of Time”). Alexandrian computus, based on rules established by the Church of Alexandria, was universally used from the beginning of the 8th century until the Gregorian calendar reform of 1582. The Roman Catholic Church has used the Gregorian calendar, and accordingly Gregorian computus, to calculate the dates of Easter since 1583. The Gregorian computus was later adopted by most Protestant churches – between 1753 and 1845 – while most Eastern Churches, including the majority of Eastern Orthodox Churches and Non-Chalcedonian Churches continued to produce the Easter date computation based on the Julian calendar (Alexandrian computus), although both had and indeed still have some complications, described in detail in dedicated studies.

The Alexandrian computus gives a 532-year period of Easter dates. Given that all possible dates on which Easter can occur lie within a 35-day period – from March 22 to April 25 (old style dates) or from April 4 to May 8 (new style dates) – the Alexandrian Easter algorithm is equivalent to 18620 options (532 x 35), showing the complexity of computus implementation in a compact clockwork. The Gregorian Easter algorithm gives even more options due to the fact that the duration of the period is 5,700,000 years (70,499,183 lunar months or 2,081,882,250 days). The German mathematician Karl Gauss presented a computus algorithm in 1800 and finalized it in 1807 and 1811. Gauss' algorithm is considered to be the most commonly used and although it was intended for calculating the Easter date for the Gregorian calendar, it is also valid for the calculation of the Easter date for the Julian calendar.

The indication of the date of the upcoming Easter is one of the rarest astronomical functions of mechanical clocks and watches due to the high levels of complexity involved. Moreover, there is significant discrepancy in computus algorithms due to the differences of the Julian and Gregorian calendars (Easter controversy). The obvious difficulties in implementing computus algorithms in clockwork explain the fact that in the entire history of mechanical clocks and watchmaking, just a few examples of computus clocks and watches have been made.

== Computus clock types ==
=== Tabular computus clocks ===
Clocks with a tabular computus provide the indication of special paschal (ecclesiastical) functions without the automatic counting of the date of Easter, so the date should be determined by the paschal table with the use of indications - the golden number, the solar cycle, the epact, the dominical letter, and the indiction – all or some of which, may be with the addition of other indications. It is believed the first Easter function in a mechanical clock was created by the Italian physician, astronomer and mechanical engineer Giovanni Dondi dell'Orologio from Padua. He built his complicated astronomical clock "Astrarium" from 1348 to 1364. The clock has not survived, but the design and construction were described in detail by Dondi in his manuscripts and provided enough material for modern clockmakers to build reconstructions. While few reconstructions have been made, one example of Dondi's computus can be found in the Smithsonian Institution (Washington DC, USA). Dondi's computus was based on a device with a wheel drive and three chain indicators of the 7980-year Julian period. The first chain with 28 links was used to indicate the dominical letter and the 28-year solar cycle, the second chain with 19 links was used to indicate the golden number, and the third chain was used for the 15-year cycle of indiction. The computus was set under the date display ring, which was designed for a 365-day year (in the leap year, Giovanni de Dondi intended to stop the clock for one day).

A tabular computus with indications of the dominical letter, the epact, the 28-year solar cycle, the golden number and the indiction was made by the French clockmaker Auguste-Lucien Vérité in his monumental astronomical pendulum clock of Besançon Cathedral (France). Built from 1858 to 1860, the clock's epact dial has an additional indication of Easter dates for a period of 19 years on cartouches, which should be replaced or repainted every 19 years by the keeper of the clock.

Ecclesiastical functions of the 28-year solar cycle, the Julian epact, the Gregorian epact, the Julian dominical letter, the Gregorian dominical letter, the golden number and the indiction were implemented by the Swiss watchmaker Albert Billeter in his supercomplicated monumental "Ivanovo" Universal Clock, which he made in 1873 in Paris and which is kept in Ivanovo Museum of Industry and Arts (also known as the D.G.Burylin Museum, Ivanovo, Russia).

The French clockmaker Paul Pouvillon included a computus module in his complicated astronomical clock with orrery, made from 1918 to at least 1939 (and probably into the 1960s). The module has a single indicator of the Gregorian Easter date in a window with a disc underneath, stamped with the Easter dates for the 19-year period from 1946 to 1964. The moveable feast's indicator is set on the tellurium dial, and its adjustment to correct the dates should be made manually. The computus module has 6 ecclesiastical functions – the 28-year solar cycle, the Gregorian epact, the Gregorian dominical letter, the golden number, the indiction and the indication of the day of the week of January 1 of the next year, so the computation of the Easter date may be provided with the help of the ecclesiastical functions even for the years after 1964, when the original Easter date disc is no more valid, as noted during restoration works in 2011–2012.

Indications of the 28-year solar cycle, golden number and indiction were used by the Norwegian clockmaker and inventor Rasmus Jonassen Sørnes in his complicated astronomical pendulum clock No.4 (Sørnes No.4), built from 1958 to 1966.

=== Computus clocks with automatic mechanical counting devices ===
The most complicated type of computus clock is rather a kind of mechanical computer making automatic Easter calculations based on ecclesiastical indications at the beginning of a given year.

The first computus clock with a fully automatic action was made by the French clockmaker and inventor Jean-Baptiste Schwilgué, the author of the third astronomical clock of Strasbourg Cathedral (Strasbourg astronomical clock), between 1838 and 1843. In 1816 he invented and built the first prototype of his mechanical computus "Comput ecclésiastique", and in 1821 he made the final calculations and design of his device, acting as a Gregorian computus. Schwilgué embedded his computus into the astronomical clock of Strasbourg Cathedral, where it continues to operate to this day. It includes 5 ecclesiastical functions – the 28-year solar cycle, the Gregorian epact, the Gregorian dominical letter, the golden number and the indiction, with the addition of a 4-digit Gregorian year indicator. At the start of each year, the computus changes the indications of the dates of Easter and moveable feasts on the annual calendar ring of the main dial in the central lower part of the clock.

The Danish clockmaker Jens Olsen, while visiting Strasbourg in 1897, was inspired by Jean-Baptiste Schwilgué's astronomical clock of Strasbourg Cathedral and in 1924 he completed a separate computus module (“Comput ecclésiastique”), that has certain similarities to Schwilgué's "Comput ecclésiastique". Later, in 1928, Jens Olsen made the calculations of a supercomplicated astronomical computus clock. The clock, known as “World Clock” (in Danish, "Verdensuret"), was finished in 1955, 10 years after his death, by his colleague Otto Mortensen, who took over the project. The clock is displayed in Copenhagen's Rådhus (City Hall). The computus of Jens Olsen's World Clock has 5 ecclesiastical functions – the Gregorian dominical letter, the Gregorian epact, the 28-year solar cycle, the indiction and the golden number, while the clock is also equipped with a Gregorian perpetual calendar indicating the date, day of the week, month and the year in four digits. Beneath the ecclesiastical dials there is an unparalleled tabular calendar showing the dates and days of the week of all 12 months of the year, the phases of the Moon for every date, and the dates of Easter and other moveable feasts. The computus and Gregorian perpetual calendar automatically switch at midnight at New Year to calculate the calendar for the following year.

The French clockmaker Daniel Marius Vachey also took his inspiration from the works of Jean-Baptiste Schwilgué and his astronomical clock of Strasbourg Cathedral. Vachey spent thirty years – from 1938 to 1968 – building his supercomplicated astronomical computus clock. The computus of the clock has 5 ecclesiastical functions – the Gregorian dominical letter, the Gregorian epact, the 28-year solar cycle, the indiction and the golden number. The clock is also equipped with a dial for 6 moveable feasts and a perpetual calendar with date, day of the week, month and bissextile year indicators.

=== Computus clock with opto-mechanical indication ===
The Easter date in a computus clock with an opto-mechanical indication is shown by the superposition of the matching holes of perforated discs. This type of display has also been used to indicate the date of Orthodox Easter. An opto-mechanical Easter date display was built into this "Easter of Christ Computus Clock" clock of 2005, the first computus clock of this type invented and made by Russian watch- and clockmaker Konstantin Chaykin.

=== Orthodox computus clocks ===
A mechanical Orthodox computus was developed by Konstantin Chaykin using a novel computus algorithm, that differs from Carl Friedrich Gauss's algorithm. The computus mechanism mechanically calculates the Orthodox Easter date at midnight at New Year and sets the calendar for the following year by means of three cam wheels, springs, levers, racks and three differential gears. In total, the computus mechanism consists of more than 300 parts. The Orthodox computus has been used in a series of Chaykin's astronomical desk clocks – the "Resurrection Computus Clock" (2007), the "Northern Computus Clock" (2015) and the supercomplicated "Moscow Computus Clock" (2016).

=== Computus clock/watch with a program cam wheel mechanism ===
This type of computus mechanism does not provide a mechanical calculation of the Easter date, but shows it by means of a program cam wheel, since the complicated design of a counting computus makes it difficult to integrate into the compact movement of a pocket watch and, in particular, a wristwatch. The only known example of a pocket watch with an indication of the Easter date according to the Gregorian calendar is the supercomplication "Calibre 89" pocket watch by the Swiss company Patek Philippe. Four copies of the "Calibre 89" and one functioning prototype were made in 1989 (the prototype is stored in the Patek Philippe Museum in Geneva, Switzerland). The Easter date display uses a program cam wheel valid for 28 years. It is assumed that this will be replaced as each term for its correct operation expires.

An extended program cam wheel mechanism was used in the display of the Easter date in the monumental astronomical clock of Beauvais Cathedral (France), built by the French clockmaker Auguste-Lucien Vérité from 1865 to 1868. The cam wheel is calculated for a period of 300 years, and the computus also has dials for indications of the dominical letter, the epact, the 28-year solar cycle, the golden number and the indiction.

== A separated computus module ==
Separated computus module is produced to demonstrate the principal action of a computus device of a clock, to try and check the complicated mechanism. Separated modules are quite remarkable because just a few examples have ever been produced. The world's first computus module, realizing the Gregorian computus algorithm, was invented, designed and made by the French clockmaker Jean-Baptiste Schwilgué ("Comput ecclésiastique", 1821, which was stolen from Strasbourg Cathedral in 1944, with the present location unknown). Subsequently, separated computus modules were made by the Danish clockmaker Jens Olsen (also called "Comput ecclésiastique"; 1924), and by the French watchmaker Frédéric Klinghammer, who reproduced Schwilgué's "Comput ecclésiastique" in a reduced scale ("Comput de Klinghammer"; 1977). The Russian watchmaker Konstantin Chaykin made an Orthodox computus module ("Comput Orthodoxe") in 2007 to demonstrate the principal action of the mechanical Orthodox computus he had invented.
