= Klinghammer's computus =

Klinghammer's computus is a mechanism determining the elements of the computus, in particular the date of Easter in the Gregorian calendar. This mechanism was built in the 1970s by Frédéric Klinghammer (1908–2006) and is nearly a reduced model of the computus found on the Strasbourg cathedral astronomical clock.

== Frédéric Klinghammer (1908-2006) ==
Frédéric Klinghammer was a former employee of the Ungerer company, a company which used to take care of the Strasbourg astronomical clock. He was then seriously involved in the design and building of the Messina astronomical clock. Later, he set down in Moulins (France) and spend the 1970s in Morocco where he built his computus.

== How it works ==
Klinghammer's computus works along the lines of Jean-Baptiste Schwilgué's computus, which was described in the reference books of 1922 and 1992. Klinghammer's computus was restored by Joseph Flores in 2006-2007 who published a book on it. Flores' book was the subject of critiques, in part because of its non scientific approach and its many gaps. Critical reviews have been published in the Mitteilungen of the Deutsche Gesellschaft für Chronometrie # 113, pages 471-472 of the "Bulletin of the National Association of Watch and Clock Collectors" (ISSN 0027-8688), vol. 50, n.4, August 2008 and in the NAWCC fora.

== See also ==
- Date of Easter
