= Messina astronomical clock =

Astronomical clock in Messina, Sicily

Coordinates: 38°11′32.14″N 15°33′16.84″E

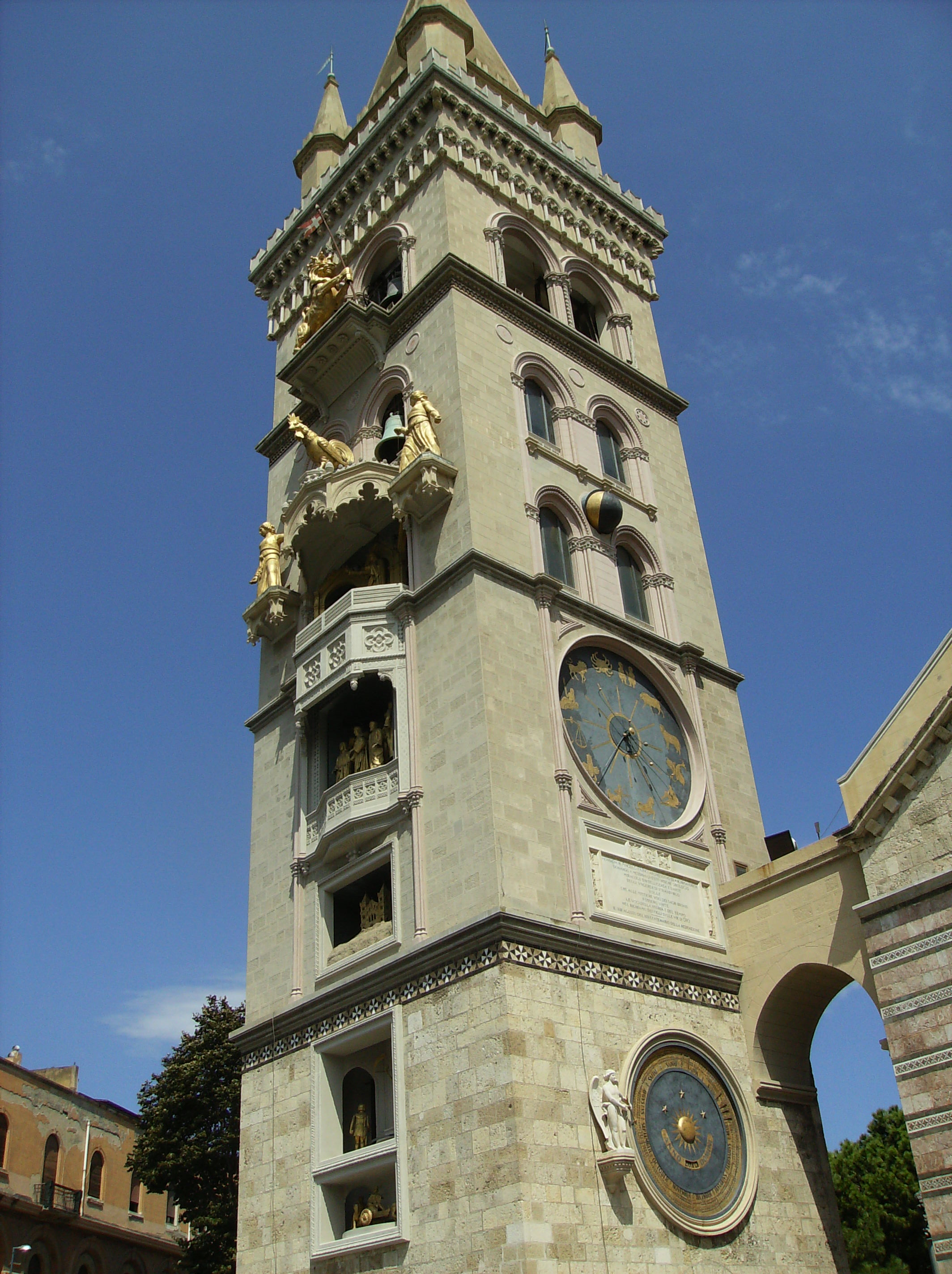
The tower of Messina Cathedral containing the astronomical clock

The astronomical clock of Messina is an astronomical clock in Messina, Sicily, southern Italy, constructed by the Ungerer Company of Strasbourg in 1933. It is built into the campanile of Messina Cathedral.

The mechanism was designed by Frédéric Klinghammer, with the artistic design based on plans by Théodore Ungerer. Parts of the design are similar to the Strasbourg astronomical clock. The idea was to restore the ancient astronomical clock of the old medieval bell tower of the cathedral of Messina, destroyed in previous eras. It was commissioned by the Archbishop of Messina Angelo Paino to mark the reconstruction of the campanile after the 1908 Messina earthquake, perhaps on inspiration of Pope Pius XI, who gave him a functioning model of the Strasbourg clock.

The clock's displays appear in several different levels of the campanile, on the sides facing the square and the cathedral.

== Components ==
The side of the campanile facing the square has the following displays, described from bottom to top:

- The carousel of the days of the week. Each day is represented by its classical deity, in a chariot pulled by an animal:
  - Sunday: Apollo, driving a horse
  - Monday: Diana, driving a deer
  - Tuesday: Mars, driving a horse
  - Wednesday: Mercury, driving a panther
  - Thursday: Jupiter, driving a chimera
  - Friday: Venus, driving a dove
  - Saturday: Saturn, driving a chimera
- The carousel of the ages of life. Four statues represent the ages of man: a child, a young man, a warrior, and an old man. Each succeeds the last every quarter hour, passing in front of the skeletal figure of Death, who waves a scythe.
- The Sanctuary of the Madonna at Montalto. Representing the sanctuary's foundation in the 13th century, a dove flies in a circle and the sanctuary rises from the ground at midday.
- Biblical scenes. A different biblical scene appears in each quarter of the liturgical year:
  - Christmas to Epiphany: the Adoration of the Shepherds. The shepherds pass and bow before Joseph, Mary and the infant Jesus.
  - Epiphany to Easter: the Adoration of the Three Kings. Led by a comet, the kings, each accompanied by a servant, adore the infant Jesus, held by Mary.
  - Easter to Pentecost: the Resurrection of Jesus. Two soldiers keep watch over Jesus' tomb, from which Jesus rises.
  - Pentecost to Christmas: the Descent of the Holy Spirit. The twelve apostles surround the Virgin Mary. A dove, symbol of the Holy Spirit, flies over the apostles; flames appears on their heads, while they raise their arms.

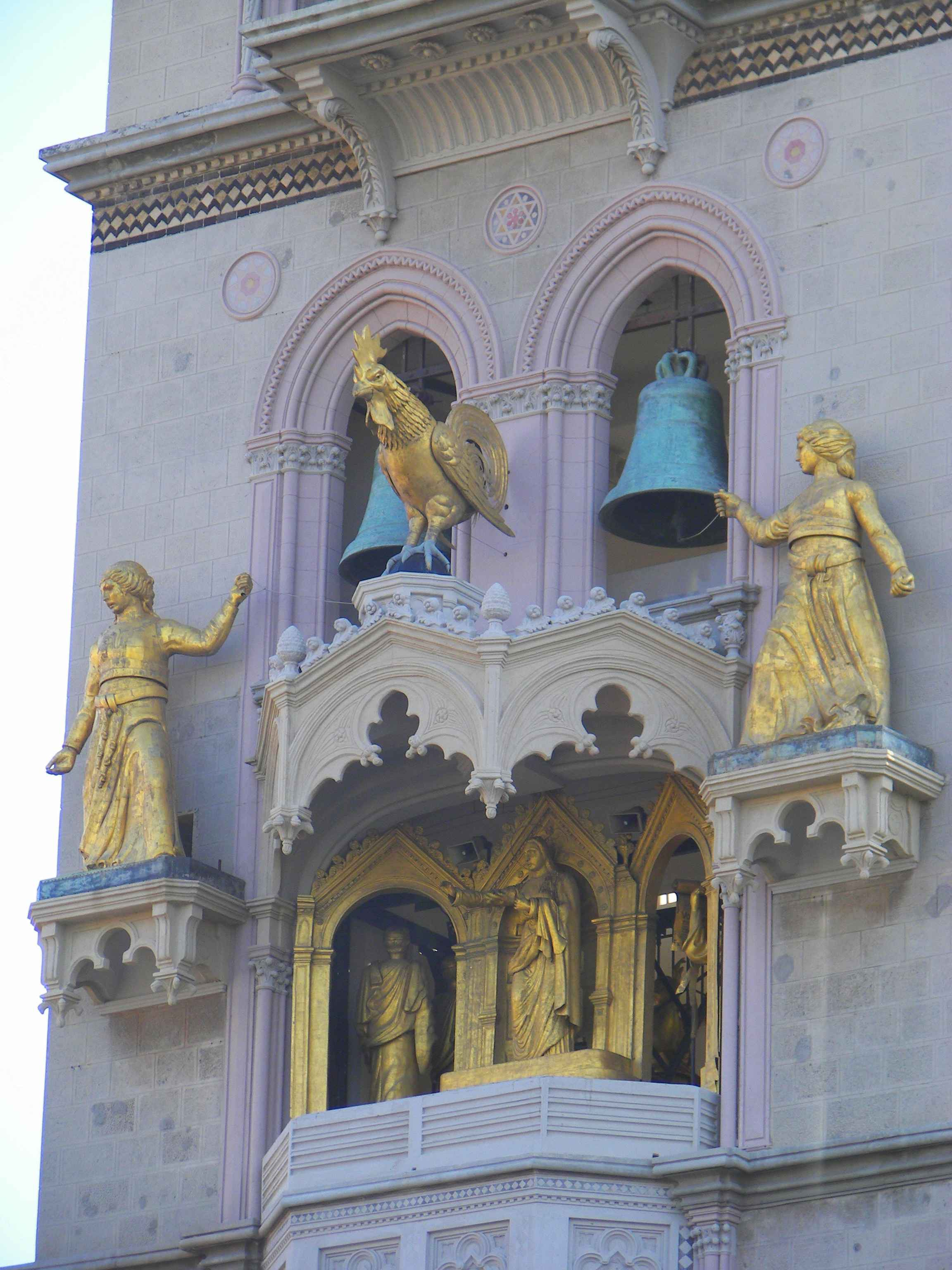
Dina and Clarenza with the rooster, above Madonna of the Letter

- The Madonna of the Letter, patron saint of Messina. According to legend, Messina's ambassadors were sent to Jerusalem to pay their respects to the Virgin Mary, and received a letter from her, granting the city her benediction. At midday, an angel hands the letter to the Madonna. St. Paul and the ambassadors pass in front of the Madonna and bow their heads.
- Dina and Clarenza. According to legend, Dina repelled an attack on Messina by rolling rocks while Clarenza rang the bells of the campanile to alert the city, during the Sicilian Vespers in 1282. They ring the quarter hour bells. Between them, at midday, the rooster flaps its wings, raises its head and crows three times.
- At the top, the crowned lion (symbol of the Province of Messina) carries the flag of Messina. At midday, it waves the flag, moves its tail, turns its head and roars three times.

== Astronomical dials ==
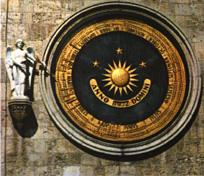
The perpetual calendar.

The side of the campanile facing the cathedral has two dials, plus the moon phase:

- The lower dial is the perpetual calendar. The outer ring rotates annually to indicate the day and month. Moving panels on the ring indicate moveable feasts. A marble angel points an arrow to indicate the day. The year is shown numerically in an aperture.
- The upper dial is the planetarium. It shows the orbit of the nine planets of the Solar System around the Sun, at the dial's centre, moving through the signs of the Zodiac. The planets are positioned proportionally to their true distance from the Sun.

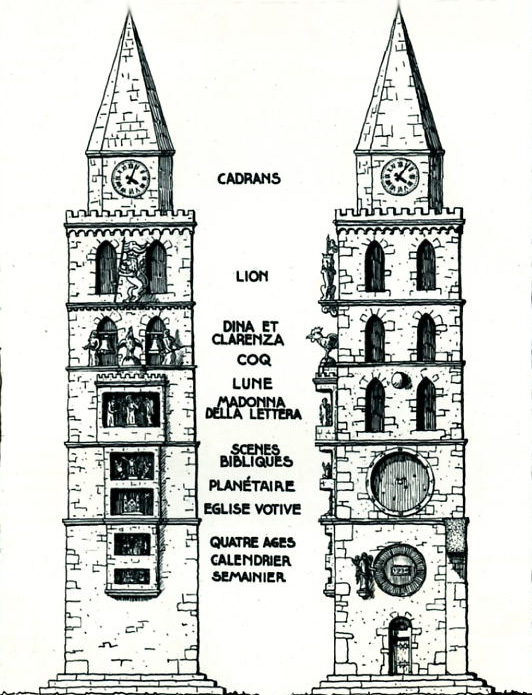
Diagram of the tower from the original designs by the Ungerer Company.

Above the dials, the Moon is represented by a half-gold, half-black rotating sphere, 1.2m in diameter, which indicates the lunar phase.
