= Jean-Louis-Alexandre Herrenschneider =

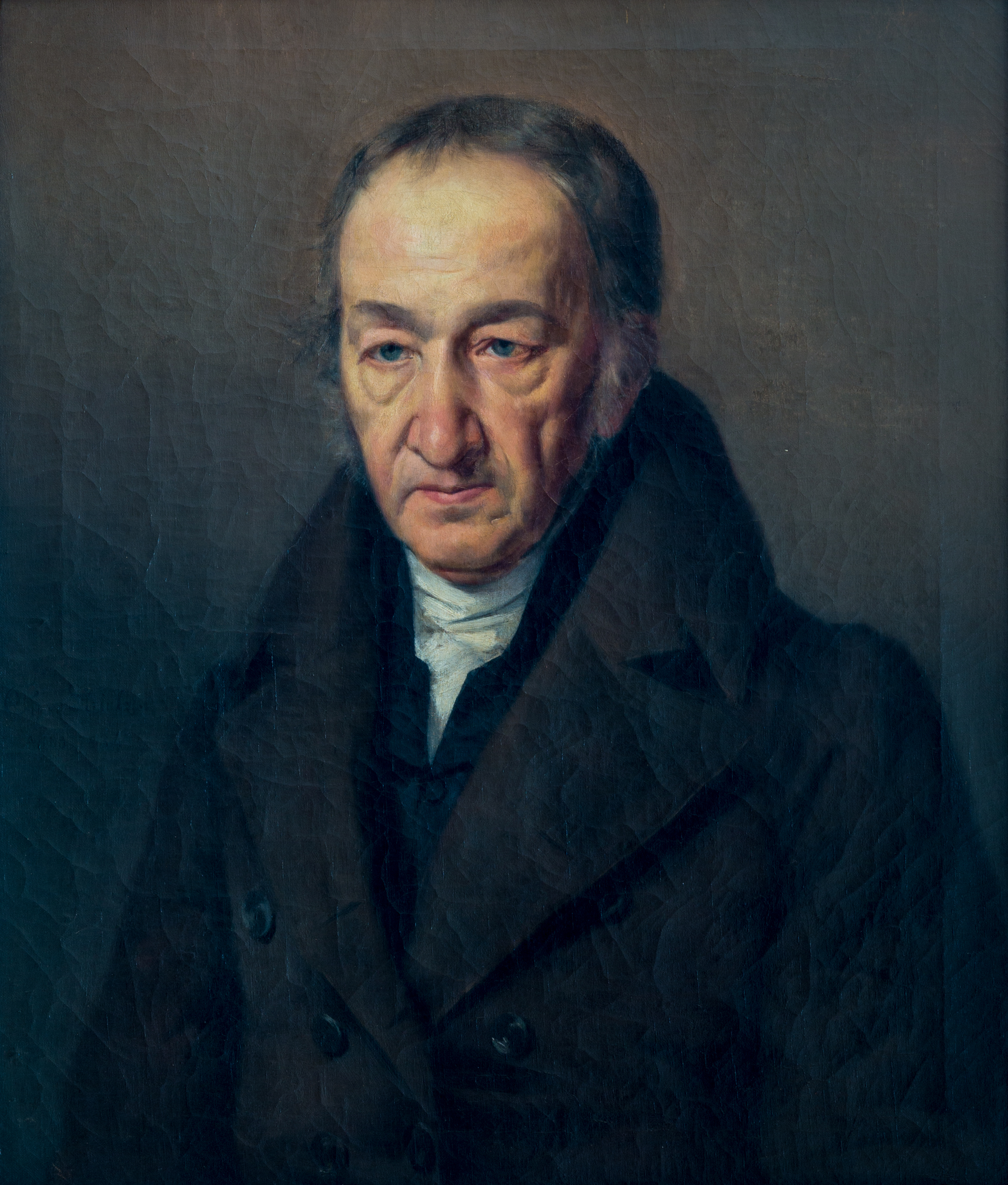
J.-L.-A. Herrenschneider by Strintz, 1834 (Koch Hall, St.Thomas' Chapter Collection, Strasbourg)

Jean-Louis-Alexandre Herrenschneider (German: Johann-Ludwig-Alexander Herrenschneider) (23 March 1760 – 4 February 1843^{[α]}) was a philosopher, mathematician, astronomer, physicist, meteorologist and lawyer.

== Early life and family ==
He was born in Gaugrehweiler ('Grehweiler' in biographical texts and personal documentation) in the Rhineland Palatinate to Marguerite Salomé Walter and Jean Herrenschneider. His father was a grammar-school principal, then a protestant court pastor and ecclesiastical inspector for Carl Magnus von Rheingrafenstein, the last count of the Gaugrehweiler line. In 1773, in a murder attempt on his father, his ten-year-old sister was shot to death as the family sat to dinner; his father was badly injured; his beloved sister's death, and his father's survival – which he considered miraculous – had a lifelong effect on him. The attacker was later found to be a subordinate of his father, one Pastor Valentin, who later took his own life. It was later suggested during the investigation that his father's authoritarian nature might have been a contributory factor to the crime. Because of this incident, the family moved to Ribeauvillé, in the Alsace region, where his father again became a pastor. In 1777, the family moved to Strasbourg where his father became deacon at St.Thomas' Church and later a pastor at Saint Aurelia’s Church. His uncle, Johann Samuel Herrenschneider, was a professor of mathematics at the University of Strasbourg.

== Career ==
Herrenschneider enrolled at the University of Strasbourg and studied mathematics and astronomy under Johann Jeremias Brackenhofer. On 26 September 1782, he gained his PhD with the dissertation "On Consciousness." On the death of his uncle in 1784, he took over his mathematics lectures at the university in October that year. He studied law at his father's behest and became licensed to practise in 1785. His passion was for the sciences and mathematics, however. In 1789, he was called to chair of astronomy, taking his recently deceased former professor Brackenhofer's role.

His professorship commenced with a tour of European observatories: he met William Herschel, Nevil Maskelyne, Jean-Dominique Cassini, Jérôme Lalande, Jean Sylvain Bailly and Pierre-Simon Laplace. On his return to Strasbourg in 1791, the university was closed as a result of the French Revolution. He taught physics, chemistry and mathematics in various local schools. During the Reign of Terror he was arrested along with his father, Isaak Haffner and Johann Lorenz Blessig and others – for refusing to renounce their faith – until the 9th Thermidor and the execution of Maximilien Robespierre. From 1795 to 1798 he was an examiner for l'École centrale des travaux publics, subsequently L'École polytechnique, a newly-founded centralised organisation, and he was also on the commission for new weights and measures. During 1796 and 1797 he was a member of the Jury of Instruction for the reorganisation of the Central School of the département of Bas-Rhin; he became professor of experimental physics and chemistry at the same school in 1800 until its closure three years later.

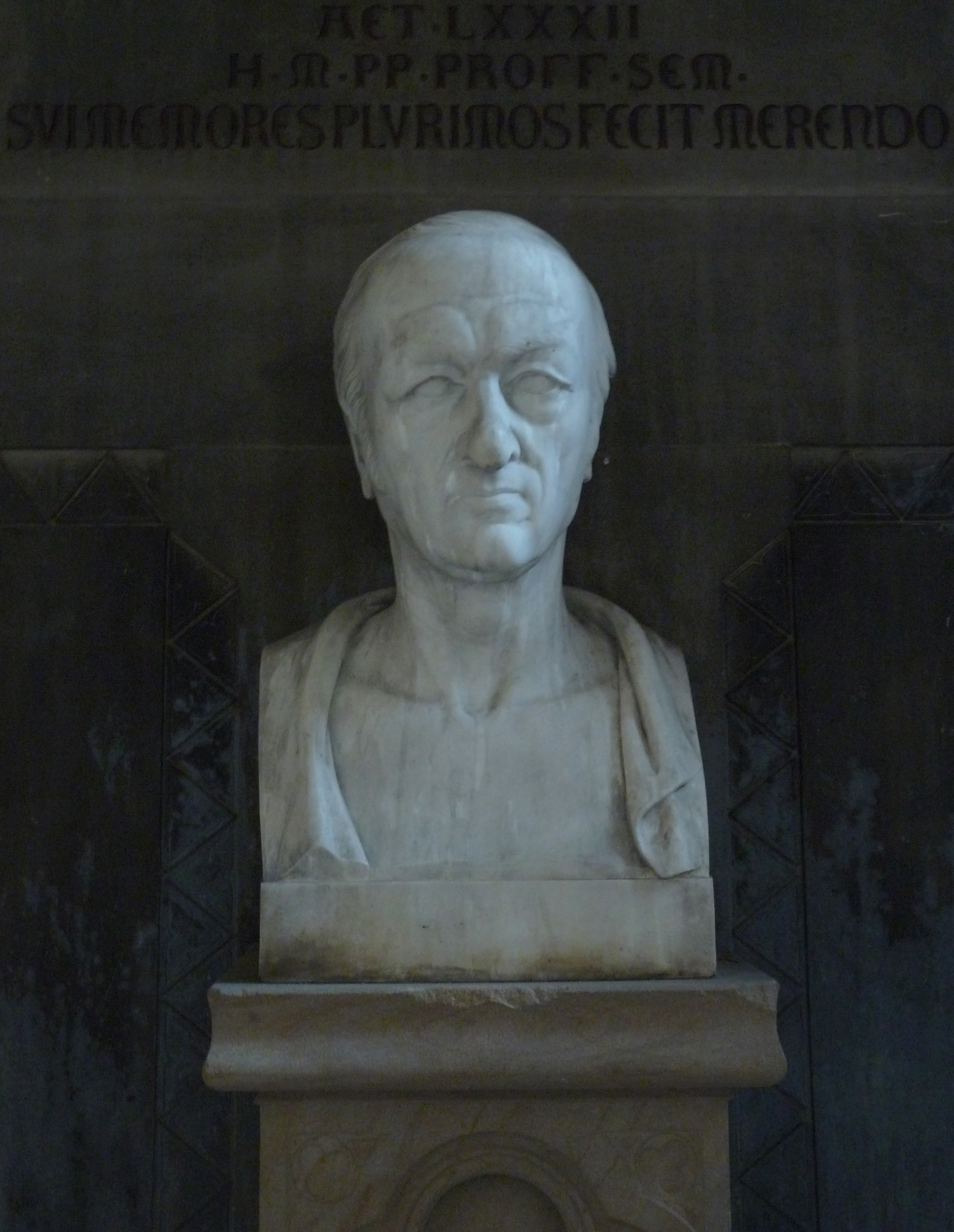
bust of J.-L.-A. Herrenschneider before his tomb at St.Thomas' Church, Strasbourg

In 1803, he was one of the founding educators at the Protestant Seminary of Strasbourg, along with Haffner and Blessig (all former professors of the University of Strasbourg who were still alive became professors at the new Seminary). There, Herrenschneider was initially a professor of philosophy. In 1807, he became a curator of the public library of the town and the seminary. From 1809, he was professor of experimental mathematical physics in the Faculty of Science at the Royal Academy of Strasbourg, a post he held until 1829. In 1808, his teaching of mathematics at the Seminary was challenged by a fellow professor, Christian Kramp, who was teaching science there and regarded Herrenschneider's Academy role as competition and threatened to denounce him to the Seminary director. Herrenschneider decided to restrict himself to the teaching of logic and metaphysics at the Seminary, which he openly admitted were not his strengths: "I believe I have understood Plato and Aristotle, Bacon and Descartes, Locke and Leibnitz, Kant and Jacobi, Fichte and as far as Schelling, but I do not understand anything about Hegel." By 1812, he was vice-director of the Seminary.

During his career, he collected 40 years of meteorological data, which was published and compared with similar data from Paris, including air pressure, humidity and temperature, magnetic-north direction, wind direction, rainfall, intensity of thunderstorms and the temperature a few metres below ground.

In 1823, he founded a society to help young people freed from prison. He was a much-loved teacher and was celebrated by his students, colleagues and the city burghers for his charitable and philanthropic works. A poem was written for his golden jubilee by Ehrenfried Stoeber. A painting by Strintz was commissioned in his honour in 1823. He was made a knight of the Legion of Honour on 29 April 1838.

From 1839, his health began to fail. In 1843, he died and was buried in a tomb at St.Thomas' Church in Strasbourg. A bust of Herrenschneider stands before it.
