= Dina and Clarenza =

Italian heroines

Dina and Clarenza are two Italian women connected in legend with the historical siege of Messina by Charles I of Anjou during the Sicilian Vespers in August 1282.

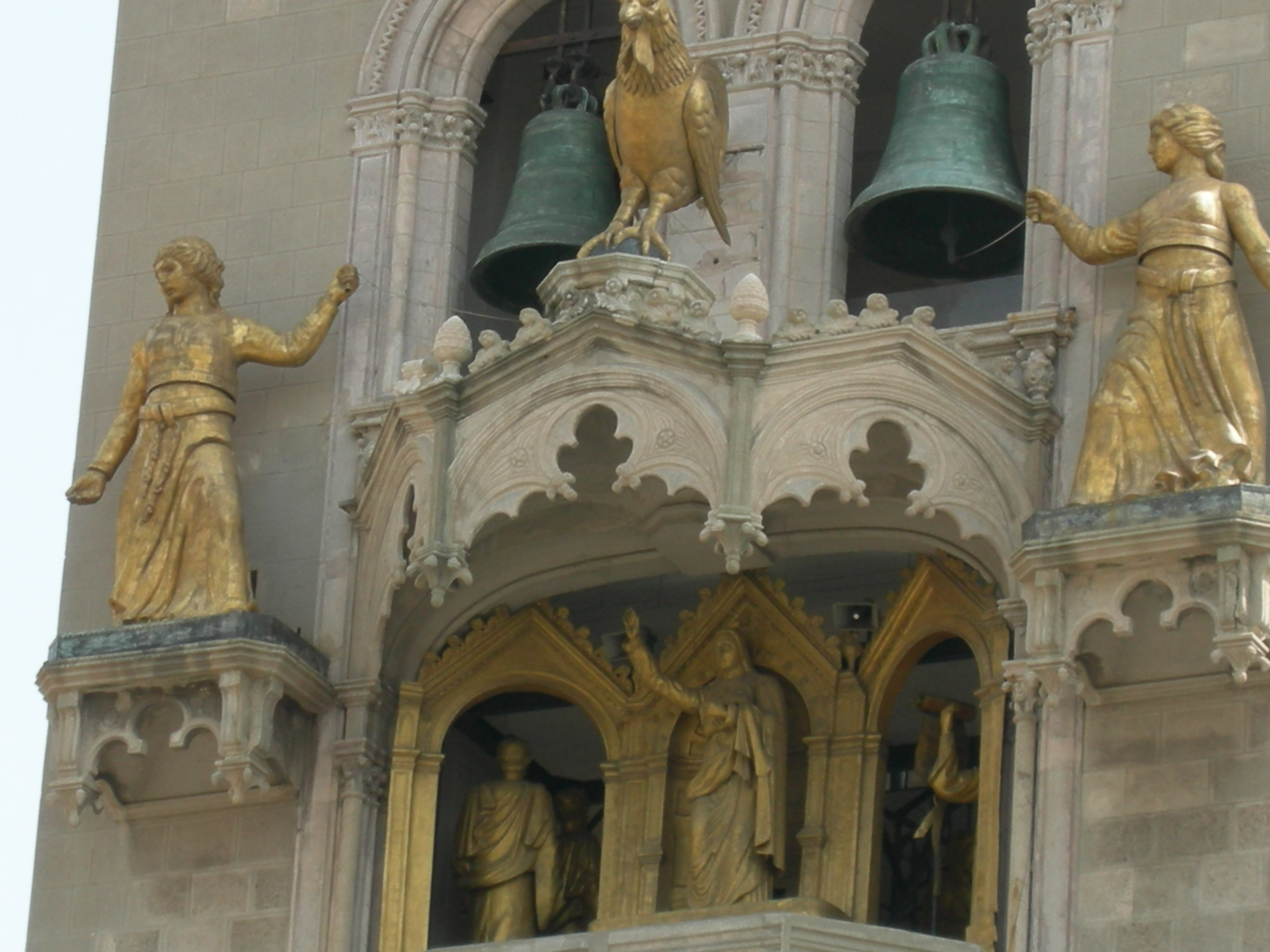
Dina and Clarenza ringing the bells to alert the Messinese people of danger (part of the campanile of the Duomo di Messina)

== The legend ==
Dina and Clarenza, two Messinese women, were heroines who, in legend, opposed the assaults of the Angevin forces.

=== Historical background ===
The Vespers rebellion, begun in Palermo on Easter Monday, 30 March 1282, outside the Church of the Holy Spirit, spread quickly all over the island. Charles I of Anjou tried in vain to put down the uprising with the promise of many reforms. Finally he decided to intervene militarily. With 75,000 men and two hundred ships, in late May 1282 he landed between Catona and Gallico (north of Reggio), on the coast of Calabria opposite Messina, to begin the siege of Messina and to block the flow of support from Reggio to the Sicilian city. The city of the Strait was being governed by Alaimo da Lentini. He was made Captain of the People and organized the resistance in the city.

Charles laid siege to Messina in vain until September, and in his attempt to conquer and occupy the city he spared no civilians, not old people, nor women, nor children. The city, although in its turn exhausted by the siege, repelled the continual attacks with the participation of the whole population.

=== The heroines ===
During the night of 8 August, there was a sneak attack by a combined Italian-French Guelph force on the city. Charles's troops tried to invade the city from the hills.

Dina and Clarenza were standing guard on the wall. As soon as they saw the enemies, they did all they could to repel the attack. While Dina continually hurled rocks down on the enemy soldiers, Clarenza rang the bells in the campanile of the Duomo, from which she awakened the whole city. Thus the Messinese rushed to the defense of their city and repelled the attack.

== Legacy ==
The heroines have become symbols of courage and of the Messinese civilians' devotion to their city. Today, Dina and Clarenza are found portrayed in Messina at Palazzo Zanca (the city hall) and on the campanile of the Duomo. The 4th Ward (formerly the 8th Quarter) of Messina, the oldest and central part of the city, is named for them.

== See also ==
- Macalda di Scaletta
