= Aurelia of Strasbourg =

Fourth-century saint

Virgin
- Feast: October 15

Saint Aurelia of Strasbourg was a 4th-century saint, whose tomb in Strasbourg became the centre of a popular cult in the Middle Ages.

== Biography ==
According to the legend, Aurelia accompanied Saint Ursula and the eleven thousand virgins from Roman Britain to Cologne, where they were favourably received by Aquilin, bishop of the place. From Cologne they traveled to Basel. From Basel the travelers descended the Rhine to Strasbourg where St Aurelia succumbed to a violent fever, dying after a few days. Three virgins were left to care for her. She was particularly invoked against fevers in the church that bears her name. Her three companions lived many years in the same place and were buried there. Some centuries later their tomb was opened and their bodies were found completely intact, marked with titles bearing their names. This legend is reproduced in the current breviary of the Diocese of Strasbourg.

Grandidier, who questions the authenticity of the legend, observed that the cult of Saint Aurelia was already very popular in Strasbourg by the 9th century.

The church of Sainte Aurélie in Strasbourg is supposed to have been built over the crypt in which the tomb of Saint Aurelia was situated.

In 1524, Martin Bucer (a Protestant), soon after his appointment as pastor of the church, instigated members of the gardeners' guild to open the tomb and remove the bones, justifying this on the grounds that the tomb had become an object of idolatry.
