= Strasbourg astronomical clock =

Historic clock in France

Coordinates: 48°34′55″N 7°45′05″E

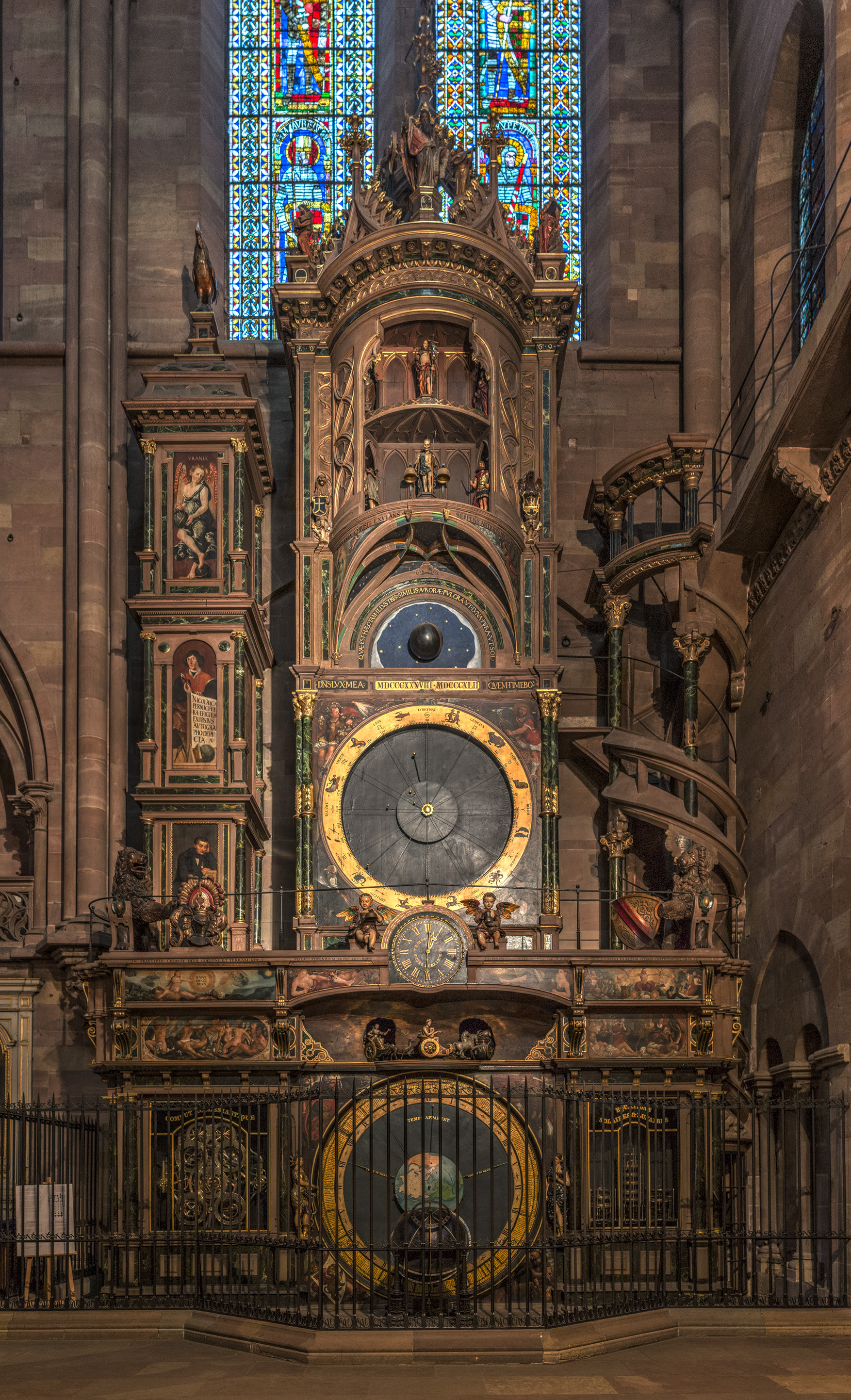
The astronomical clock inside Notre-Dame de Strasbourg

The Strasbourg astronomical clock is located in the Cathédrale Notre-Dame of Strasbourg, Alsace, France. It is the third clock on that spot and dates from the time of the first French possession of the city (1681–1870). The first clock had been built in the 14th century and the second in the 16th century when Strasbourg was a Free imperial city of the Holy Roman Empire.

The current, third clock dates from 1843. Its main features, besides the automata, are a perpetual calendar (including a computus), an orrery (planetary dial), a display of the real position of the Sun and the Moon, and solar and lunar eclipses. The main attraction is the procession of the 18-inch high figures of Christ and the Apostles, which occurs every day at solar noon, while the life-size rooster crows thrice.

== Clocks ==
=== First clock ===
The first clock was built in the Cathedrale Notre-Dame of Strasbourg sometime between 1352 and 1354, the name of its maker is unknown.

The first, a mechanical gilded rooster, sat as the centerpiece and is believed to be the oldest example of automata in the world. It was used as part of the second clock before being put on display at the Strasbourg Museum for Decorative Arts in the Palais du Rohan. This bird, a symbol of Christ's passion, was made of iron, copper, and wood. At noon it flapped its wings and spread out its feathers. It also opened its beak, put out its tongue, and by means of a bellows and a reed, crowed. In the top compartment at noon, to the sound of a small carillon, the Three Kings bowed before the figure of The Virgin Mary and the Christ Child.

The clock most certainly had an astrolabe dial and a calendar dial. It was standing on the wall opposite the current clock, and a staircase led to its various levels. Supports for former balconies can still be seen today, and suggest that the height of the clock was about 18 m (59'), with a width of about 7.70 m (25') at the base. At the base a painted figure of a zodiacal man showed the relationship between the signs of the zodiac and parts of the human body.

There is also a big circle engraved on the wall, but this circle is not a remnant of the first clock. It was added at a later stage, for some unclarified reason.

The entire structure was dismantled in 1572–4 when the second and even more ambitious clock was mounted on the opposite wall of the south transept.

=== Second clock ===
The first clock stopped working and a new one was started in the 16th century. It was designed by the mathematician Christian Herlin. At the start of the construction, around 1547, the cathedral was under the control of the Protestants. During this time the stone case and the staircase were built along with the dial and iron framework. Work was halted a year later when the cathedral was put under Catholic control and would not resume until 1571 when the cathedral was again under the control of the Protestants.

Construction of the clock resumed under the direction of Conrad Dasypodius, a pupil of and successor to Herlin who had since passed away. Dasypodius enrolled the Swiss clockmakers Isaac Habrecht and Josia Habrecht, as well as the astronomer and musician David Wolckenstein, and Swiss artists Tobias Stimmer and his brother Josias. The clock was completed in 1574.

This clock was remarkable both for its complexity as an astronomical device and for the range and richness of its decorations and accessories. As well as the many dials and indicators - the calendar dial, the astrolabe, the indicators for planets, and eclipses - the clock was also well endowed with paintings, moving statues, automata, and musical entertainment in the form of a six tune carillon. The Stimmers painted large panels that depicted the three Fates, Urania, Colossus, Nicolaus Copernicus, and various sacred themes, including the Creation, the resurrection of the Dead, the last judgment, and the rewards of virtue and vice.

At the base of a clock there was an 86 cm (34") diameter celestial globe, accompanied by the figure of a pelican. The globe was connected to the clock movement, and set for the meridian of Strasbourg.

A popular feature of the new clock was the golden cockerel, a relic of the first clock, which perched on the top of the cupola and entertained the onlookers at noon every day until 1640, when it was struck by lightning.

Most of the works are still preserved in the Museum of Decorative Arts.

=== Third clock ===
The second clock stopped working around 1788 and stood still until 1838 when Jean-Baptiste Schwilgué (1776–1856) started to build the current clock. He designed new mechanisms to replace the old ones and which were meant to be state-of-the-art. Schwilgué had wanted to work on the clock since his boyhood, but he only got the contract 50 years later. In the meantime, he had become acquainted with clockmaking, mathematics, and mechanics. He spent one year preparing his 30 workers before actually starting construction. Then, construction lasted from 1838 until 24 June 1843. The clock, however, was inaugurated on 31 December 1842.

The gold hands of the clock show mean solar time, or "temps moyen"; the silver hands show Central European Time, labelled "heure publique". In winter, mean solar time is approximately 30½ minutes behind Central European Time.

The clock features a planetary calendar, which shows the current positions of the sun and moon, and a mechanical rooster. Every day at 12:30 the rooster crows and apostles move around the clock.

This clock contains probably the first perpetual mechanical Gregorian computus, designed by Schwilgué in 1816. In the 1970s, Frédéric Klinghammer built a reduced replica of it.

== Model ==
In 1887, a 25-year-old Sydney watchmaker named Richard Smith built a working model of the third clock in the scale 1:5. Having never seen the original, Smith had to work from a pamphlet which described its timekeeping and astronomical functions. This model is in the collection of the Powerhouse Museum, Sydney, Australia.

== Detail ==
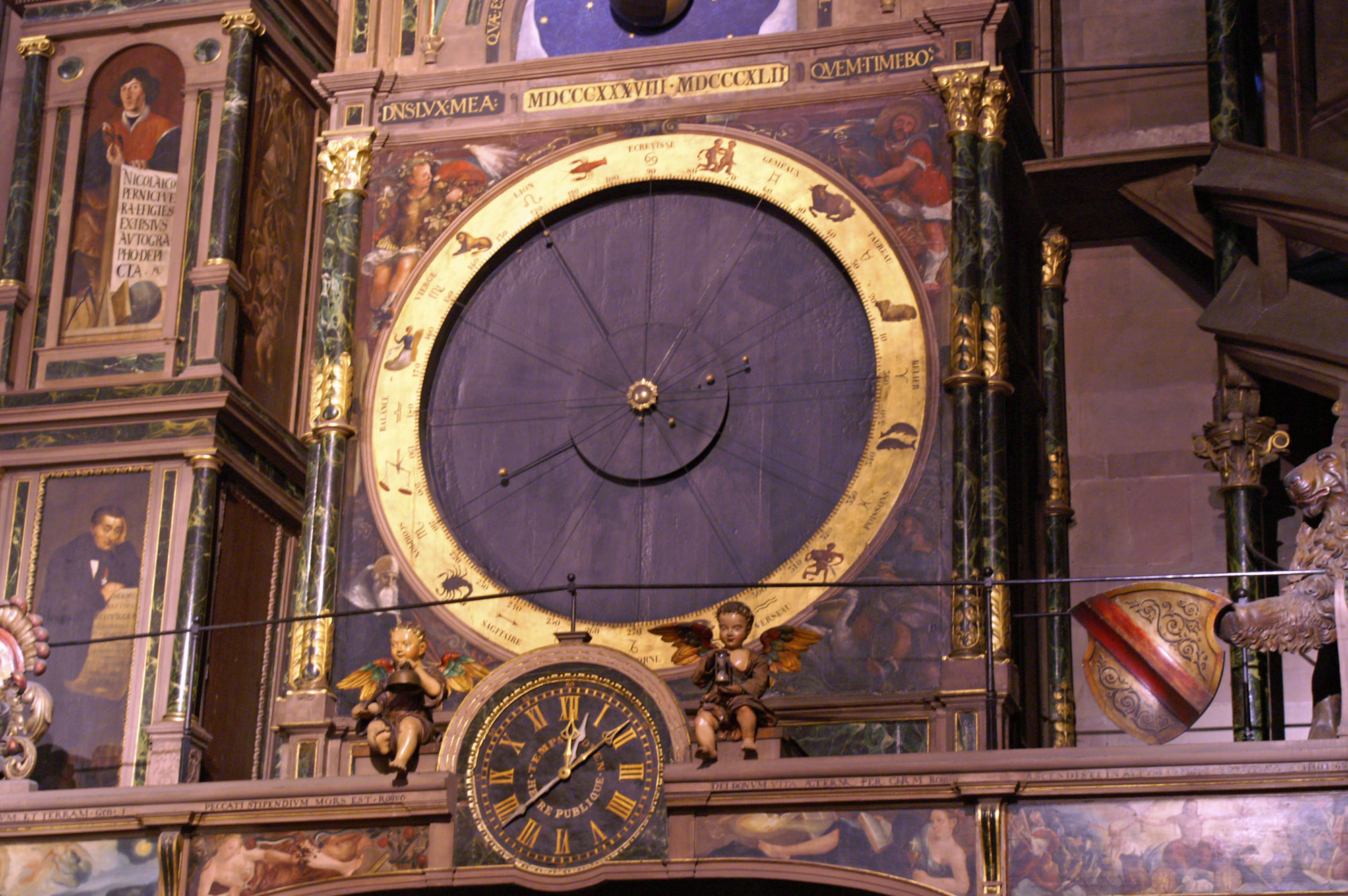
Orrery

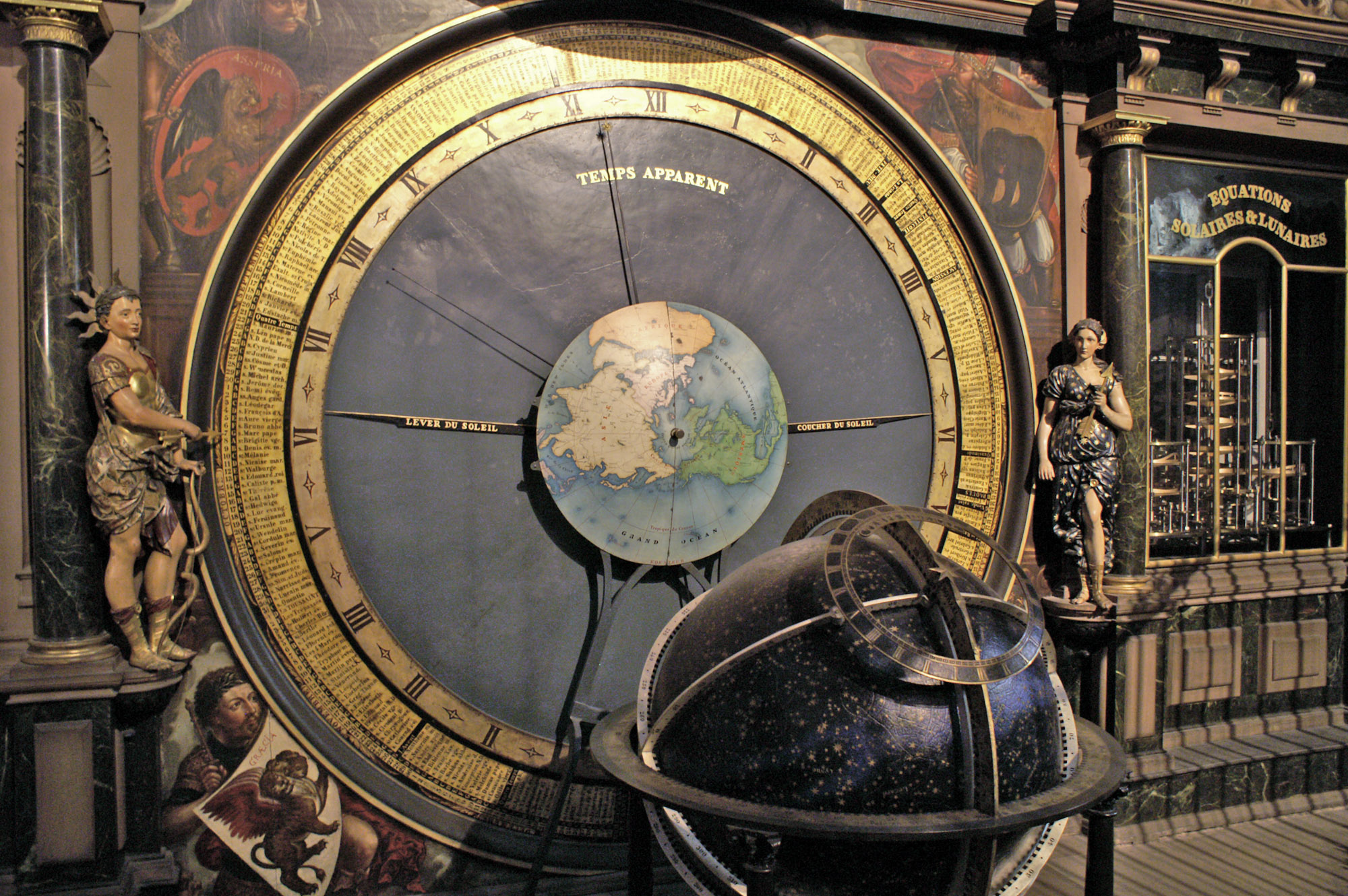
The 24-hour dial

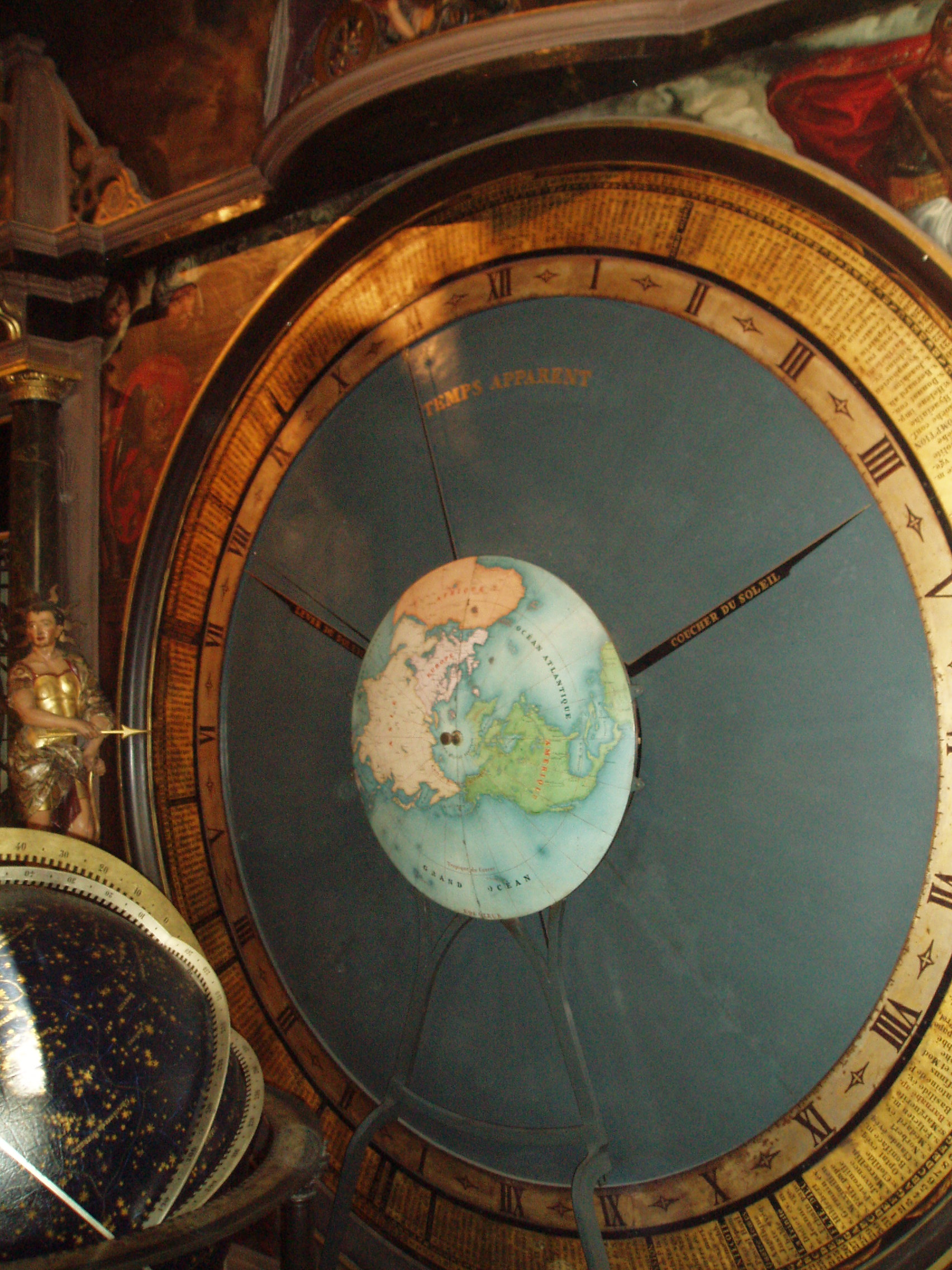
Side view

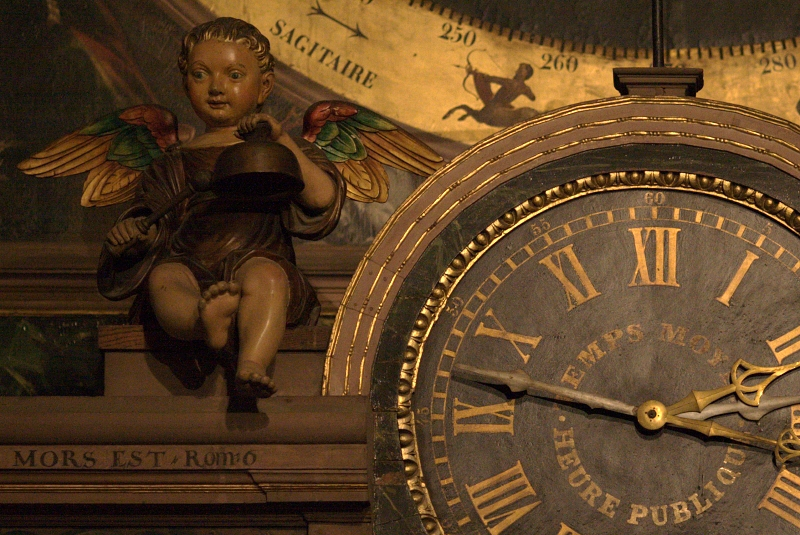
12-hour clock and cherub

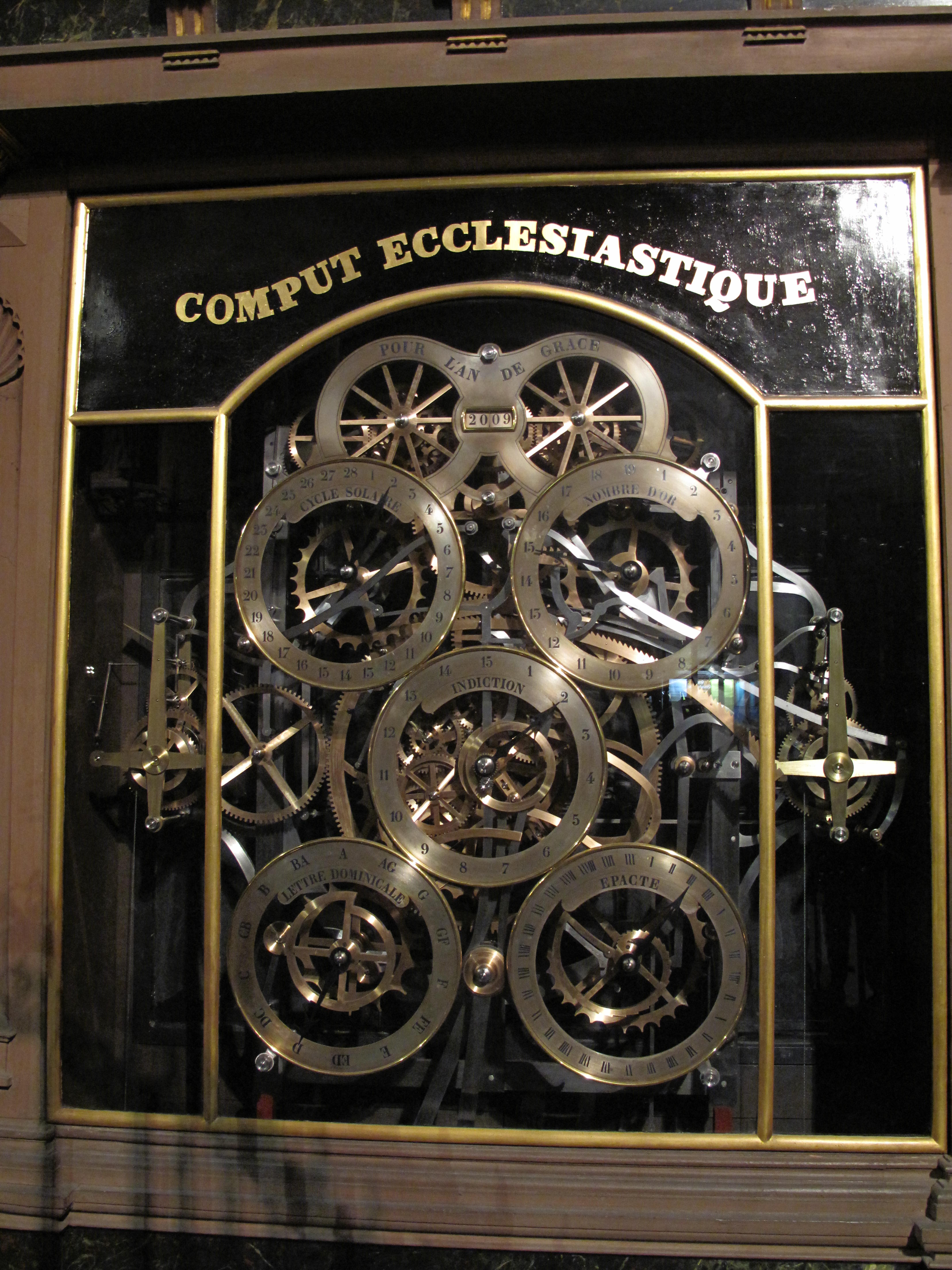
Computus work

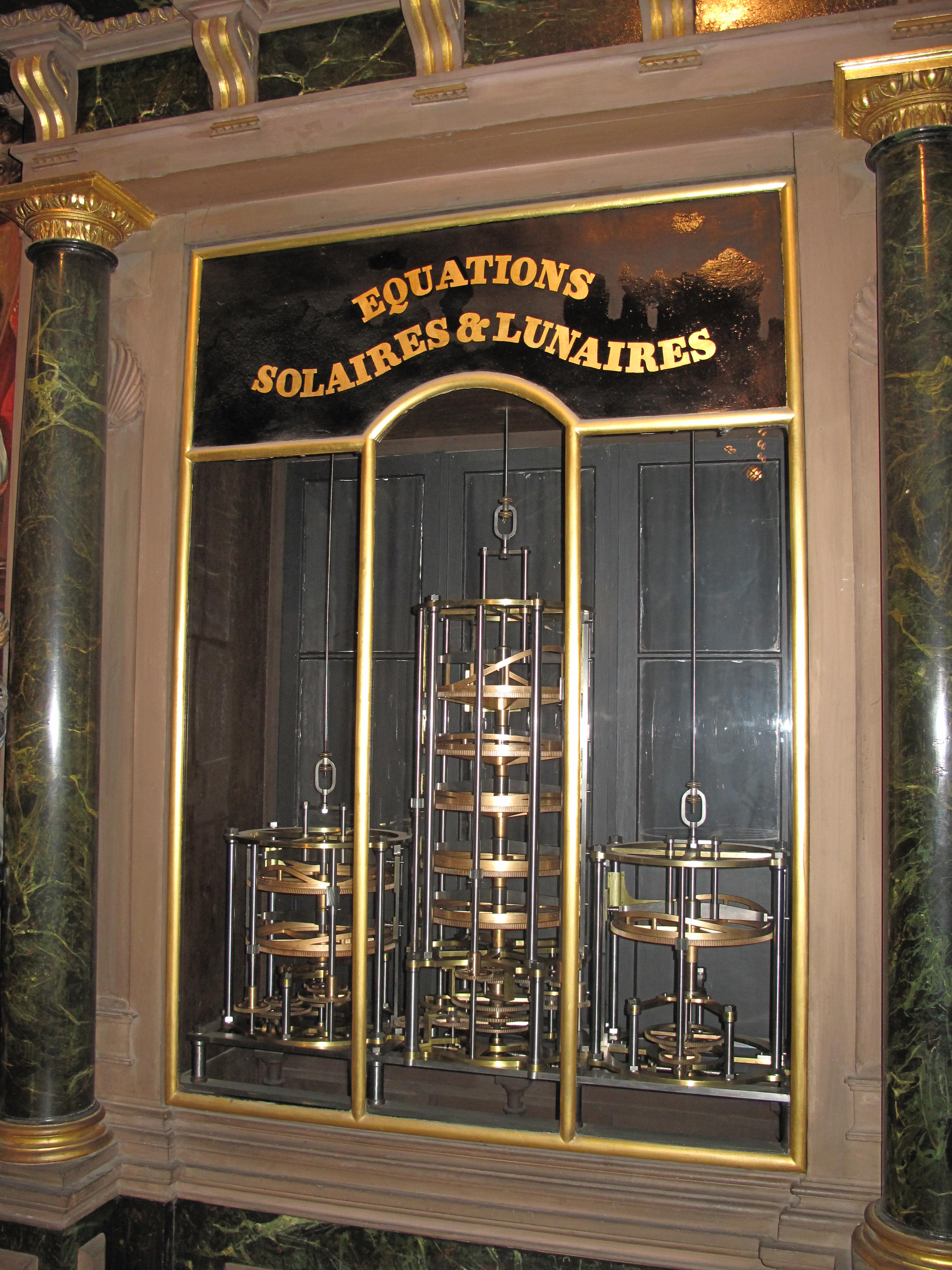
Equations

== See also ==
- Astronomical clock

== Notes ==
- Henry King: "Geared to the Stars: the evolution of planetariums, orreries, and astronomical clocks", University of Toronto Press, 1978
- Alfred Ungerer and Théodore Ungerer: "L'horloge astronomique de la cathédrale de Strasbourg", Strasbourg, 1922
- Henri Bach, Jean-Pierre Rieb, and Robert Wilhelm: "Les trois horloges astronomiques de la cathédrale de Strasbourg", 1992
- Günther Oestmann: Die Straßburger Münsteruhr: Funktion und Bedeutung eines Kosmos-Modells des 16. Jahrhunderts. Stuttgart 1993; 2nd edition Berlin/Diepholz 2000.
