= Saint Aurelia's Church, Strasbourg =

Church in Strasbourg, France

Coordinates: 48°34′53″N 7°44′00″E

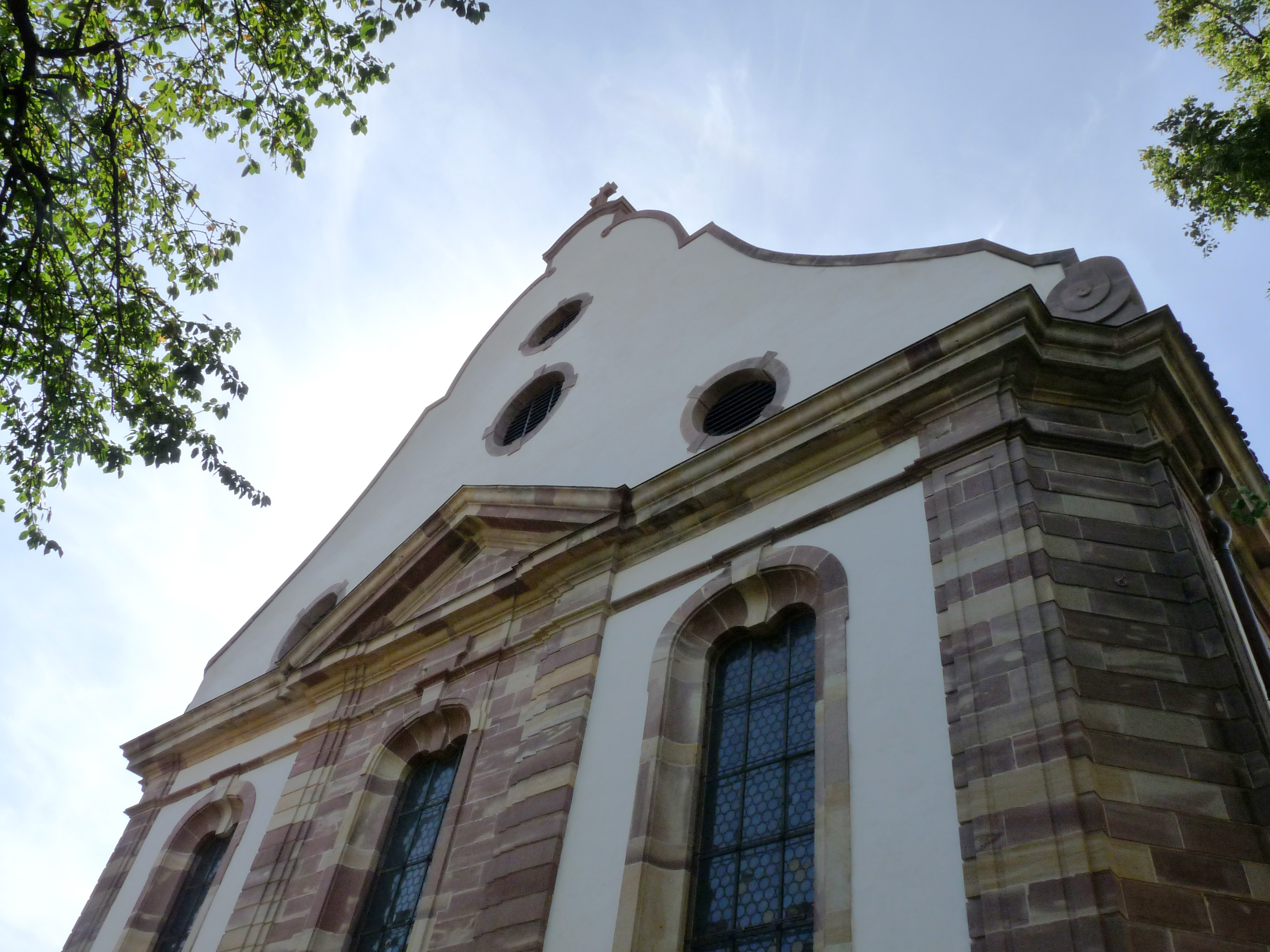
Detail of Baroque façade

The Church of Saint Aurelia (église Sainte-Aurélie), situated in the west of Strasbourg near the railway station, is one of the Strasbourg churches with the longest history. A Lutheran church since the Reformation, the church is of particular historical and architectural interest.

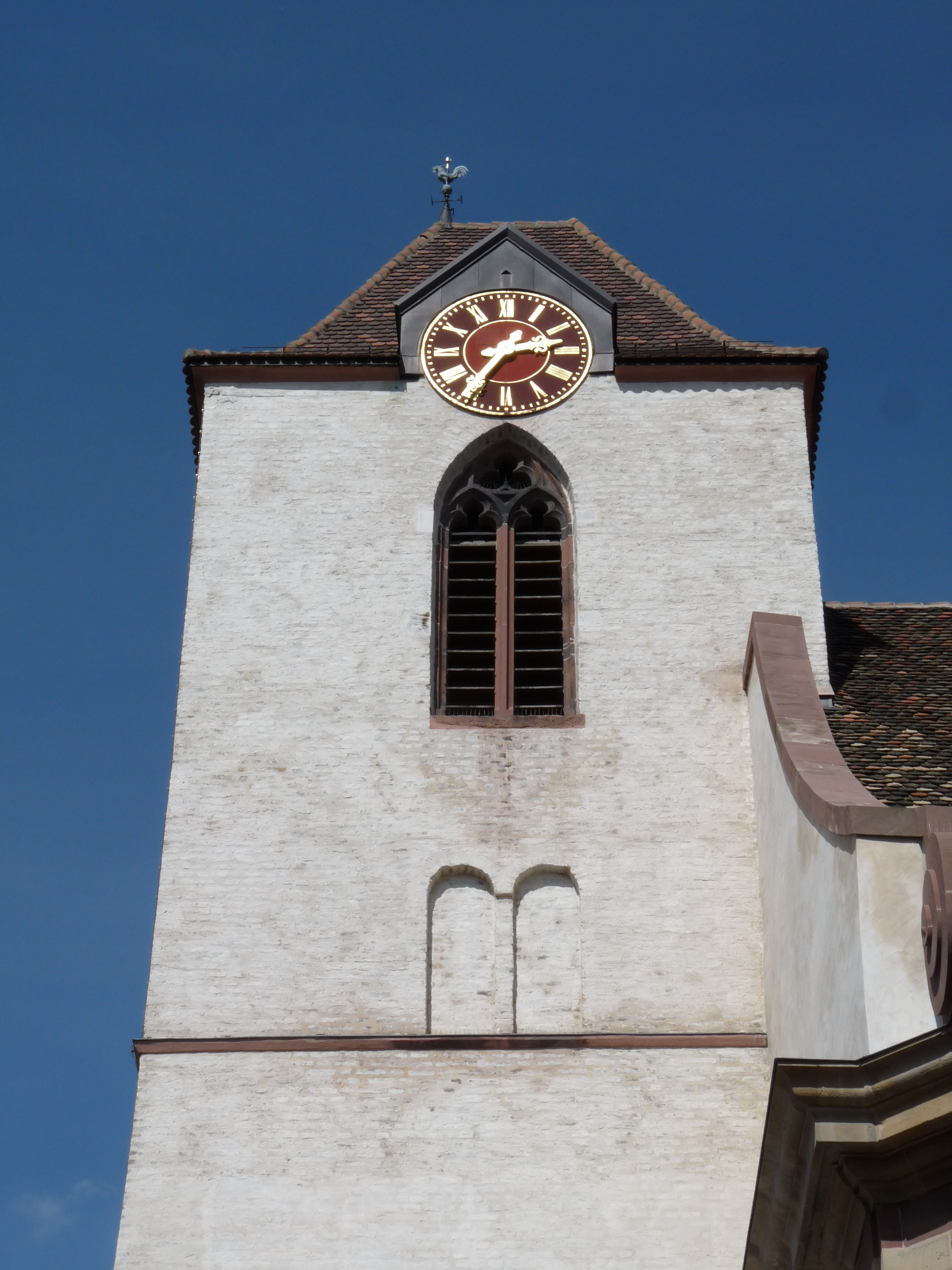
Detail of Gothic steeple

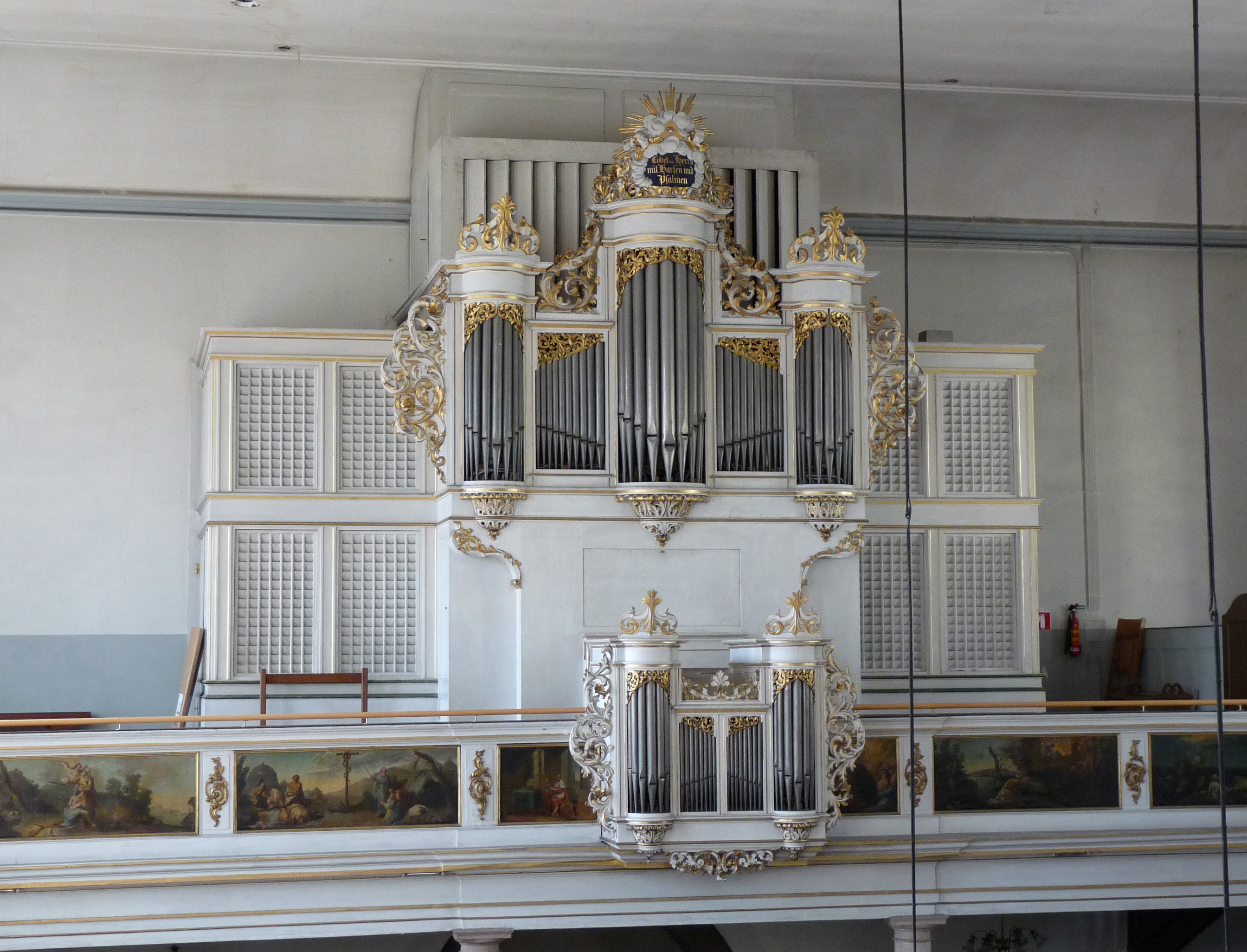
Pipe organ

== The name ==
The Church is mentioned for the first time in 801, when it is referred to as the church of Saint Maurice. The name of Saint Aurelia appears only in 1324 when there is a reference to the Church of Saint Maurice "commonly called Saint Aurelia". The change in name seems to be a response to a popular movement since the church was known locally as Sainte Aurélie long before the name was officially changed. It is probably linked to the cult of Aurelia of Strasbourg. According to the legend, the Church stands on the site of the tomb of Aurelia.

== The Reformation ==
In 1524, at the beginning of the Reformation, Martin Bucer was appointed as extra pastor of the church by the guild of gardeners, the largest guild in Strasbourg. He joined Symphorien Pollio, with whom the gardeners were less than happy. The Chapter of St Thomas had at first refused the appointment, scandalised by Bucer's marriage and ex-communication. The gardeners then appealed to the City Council, who forced the Chapter of St Thomas to accept Bucer.

Bucer preached his first sermon there on 24 February 1524 and quickly rose to become the leader of the reform in Strasbourg. He stayed at St. Aurelia's until 1531. One of the first results of his arrival was the opening of the tomb where the remains of Aurelia were supposed to lie and the removal of the bones by the gardeners, with Bucer justifying this on the grounds that the tomb had become an object of idolatry. Soon afterwards he began the removal of images from St Aurelia's and other Strasbourg churches.

== New church ==
Due to structural weaknesses, the church was completely rebuilt in the 18th century, the new church being inaugurated in 1765. The Church is notable for its Baroque interior, which includes a white and gold altar. The galleries are decorated with twenty-three biblical scenes by the Strasbourg painter Pierre Joseph Noël, painted in 1767.

The church possesses the oldest bell in Strasbourg, dating from 1410, as well as a bell-tower clock dating from 1845 by Jean-Baptiste Schwilgué, the creator of the third astronomical clock of Strasbourg Cathedral. It is the only Schwilgué bell-tower clock that is still functioning. The church is owned and used by a congregation within the Protestant Church of Augsburg Confession of Alsace and Lorraine.

In 1988 the Church was listed as a French heritage site (Monument historique).

== Organ ==
The Church is also known for its 1718 Andreas Silbermann organ, on which Albert Schweitzer produced some recordings of Bach and Franck in 1936 for Columbia.

== Battle of Austerlitz ==
In 1805 and early 1806 the Church was used to house Austrian and Russian prisoners, some of the 70,000 prisoners of war taken by the French after the Battle of Austerlitz.

== 21st century parish ==
The current pastor, since 2012, is Petra Magne de la Croix.

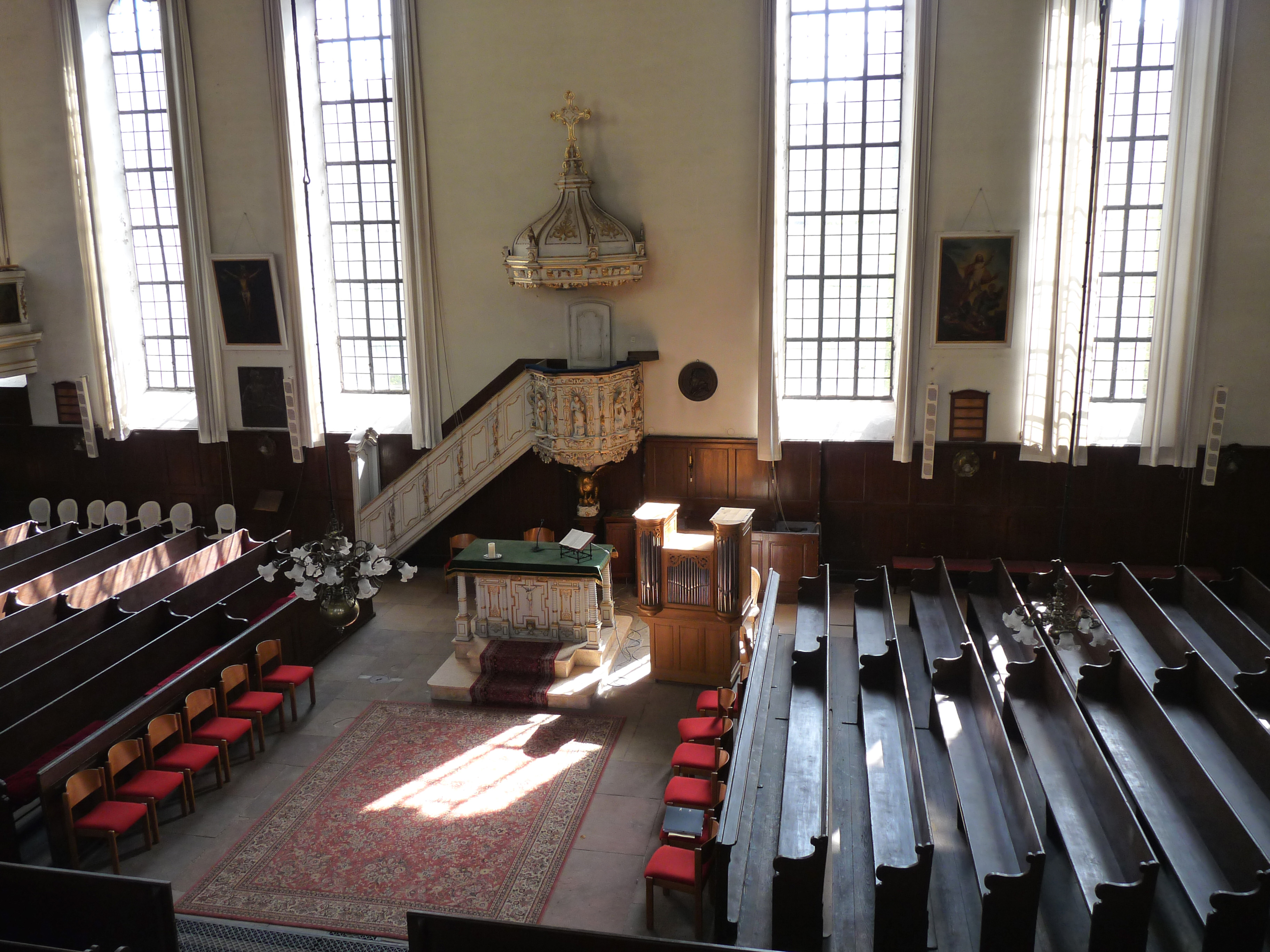
Altar

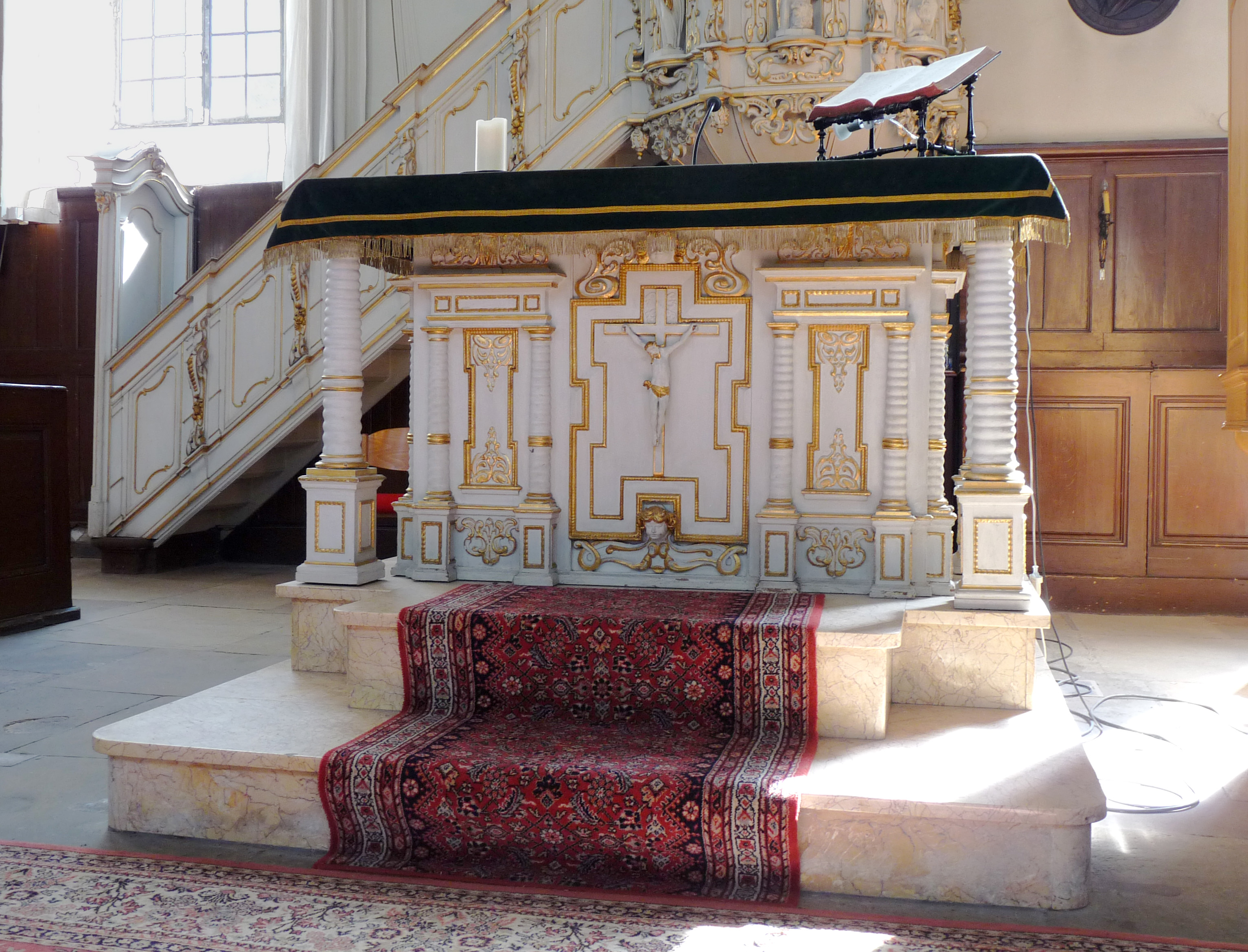
Altar

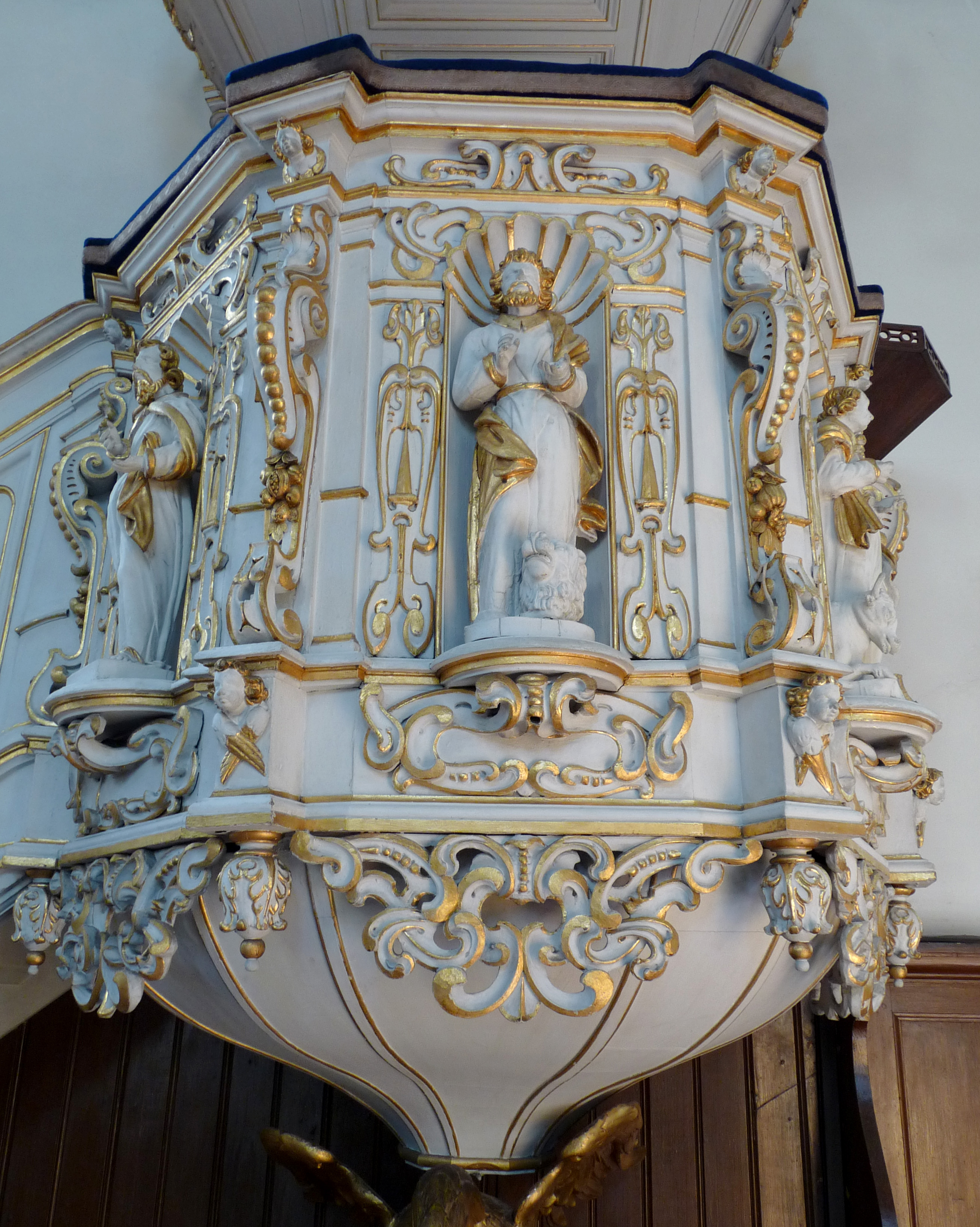
Pulpit

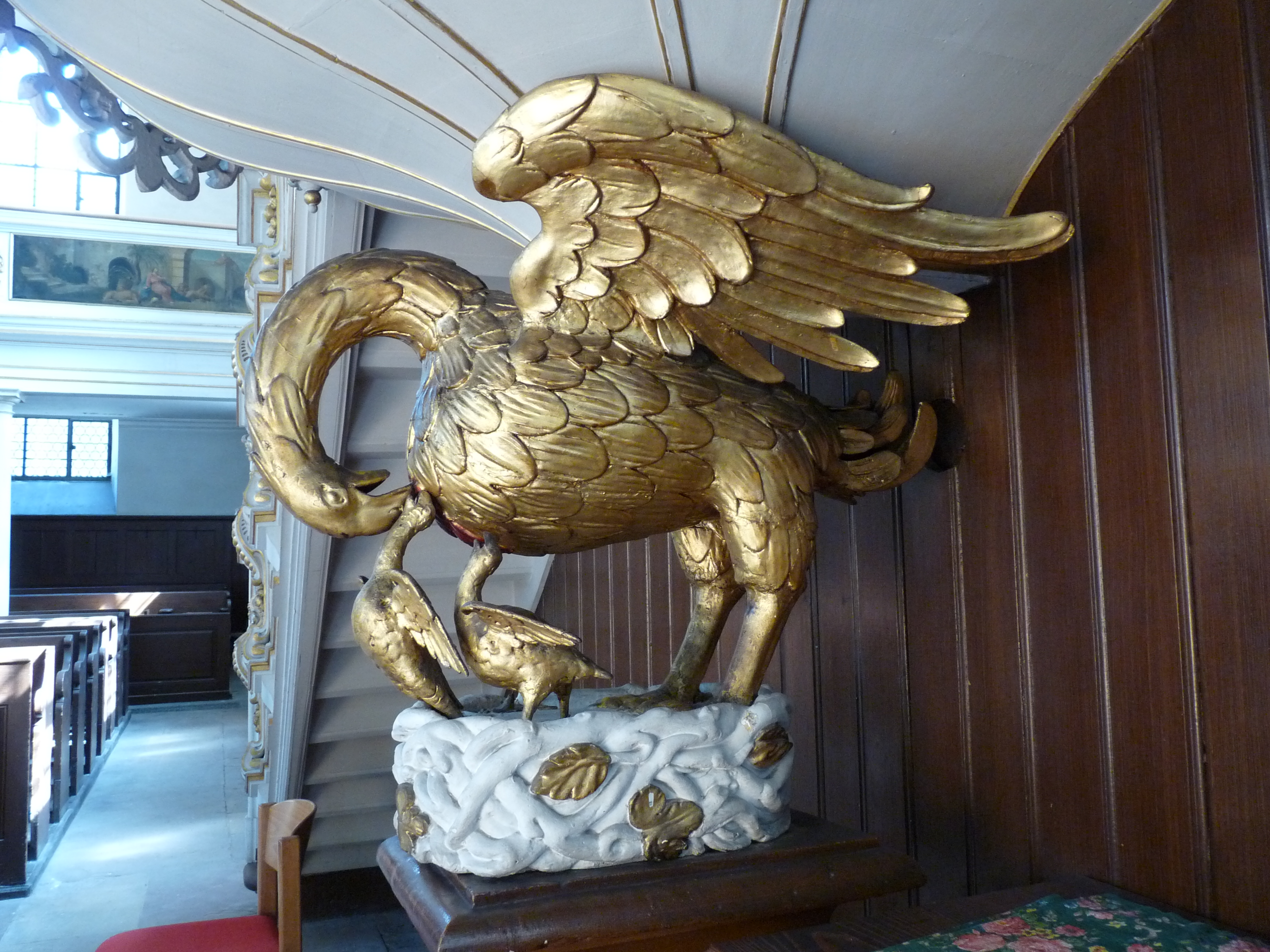
Pelican base of pulpit
