= Auguste-Lucien Vérité =

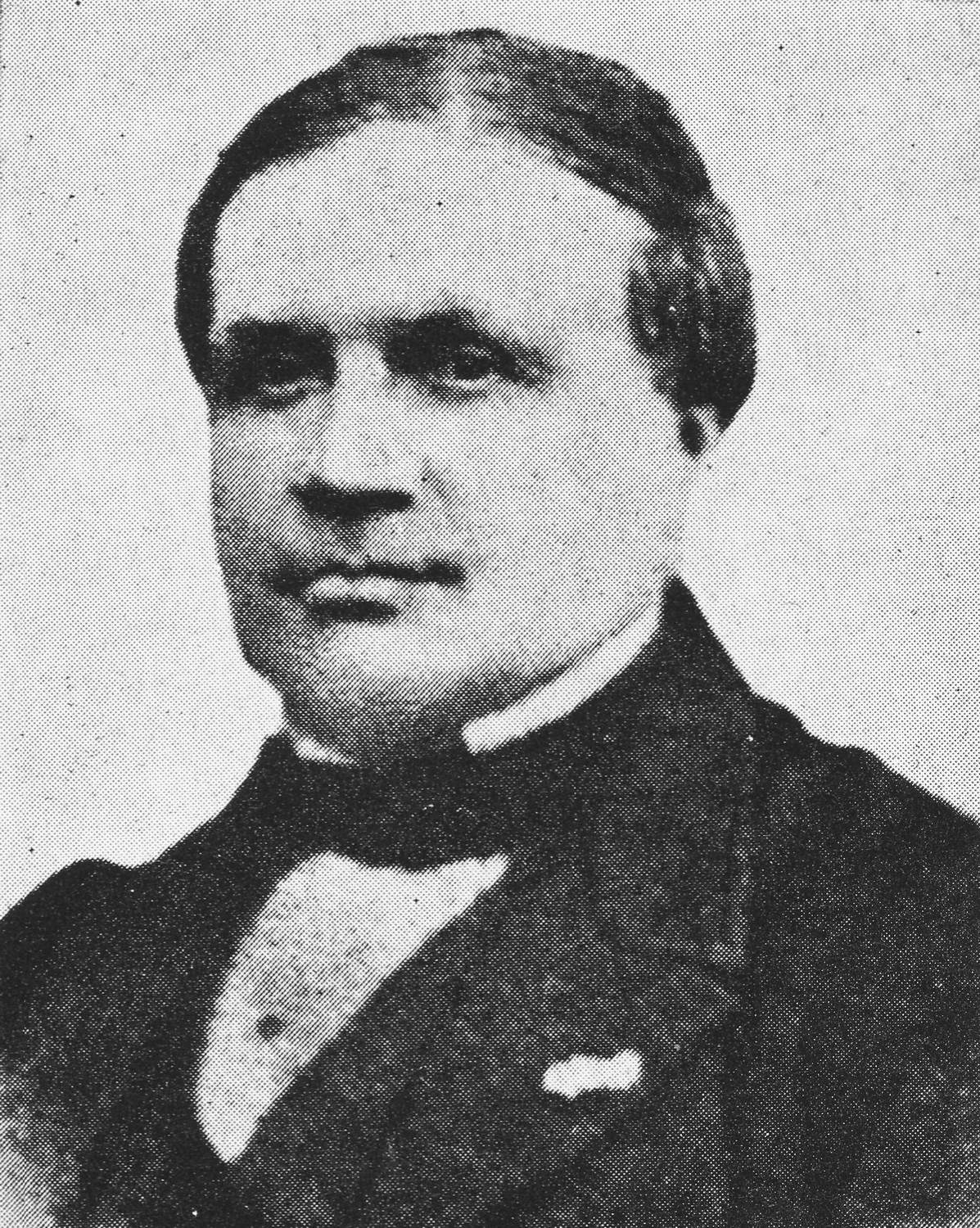
- Born: 21 October 1806; Beauvais, France
- Died: 19 July 1887 (aged 80)
- Occupation: Clockmaker

Auguste-Lucien Vérité (21 October 1806 – 19 July 1887) was a French clockmaker, the creator of the Besançon astronomical clock and the Beauvais astronomical clock.

Vérité also did pioneering work on clock synchronisation. Working for the Chemins de fer du Nord railway company, he installed a clock network at Gare du Nord in Paris with all the station clocks regulated by electromagnetic impulse from a single master clock.
