= Beauvais astronomical clock =

Coordinates: 49.4325°N 2.0814°E

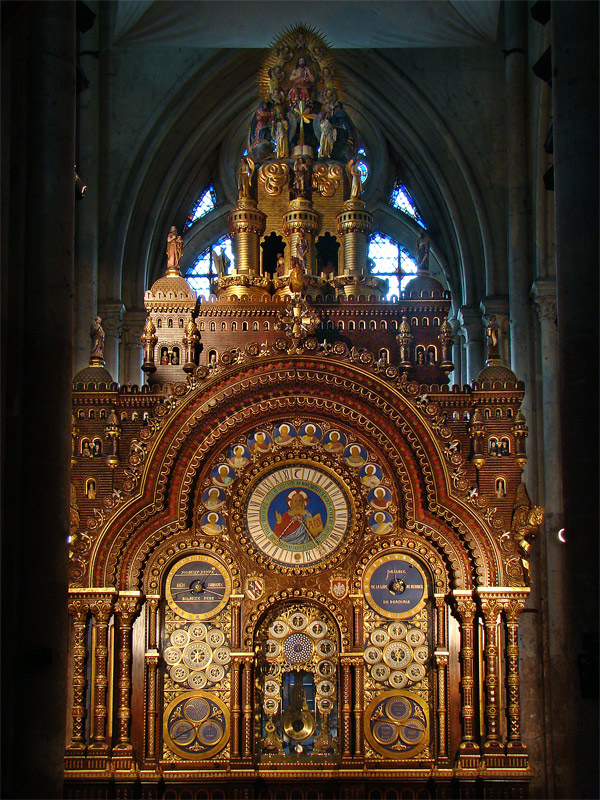
Beauvais Astronomical Clock

The Beauvais Astronomical Clock is a nineteenth-century astronomical clock in Beauvais Cathedral in northern France.

== History and description ==
The clock was built between 1865 and 1868 by Auguste-Lucien Vérité. It is 12 metres high, and 6 metres wide.

The 52 dials display the times of the rising and setting sun and moon, the position of the planets, the current time in 18 cities around the world, and the tidal times. The clock also displays the epact (i.e. age of the moon in days on January 1) and the golden number used in calculating the date of Easter.

The hours and minutes are shown in the large central face which depicts Jesus Christ and the twelve apostles.

An 1886 edition of Blackwood’s Edinburgh Magazine remarks that: "In the eyes of the neighbourhood the chief wonder of Beauvais is not the cathedral, but the astronomical clock...The mechanical part is admirable. It tells everything which any one can wish to know."
