= Messina Cathedral =

Cathedral in Messina, Sicily, Italy

Coordinates: 38.1922°N 15.5554°E

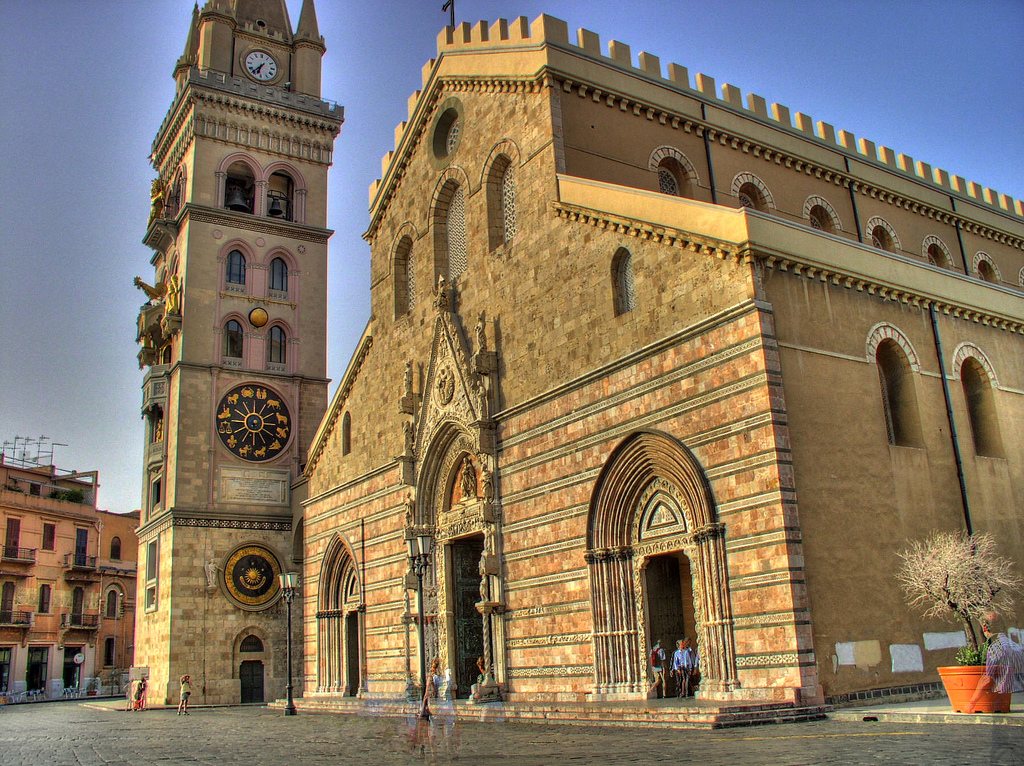
Messina Cathedral

Messina Cathedral (Italian: Duomo di Messina; Basilica Cathedrale metropolitana di Santa Maria Assunta) is a Roman Catholic cathedral located in Messina, Sicily. Formerly the episcopal seat of the Diocese of Messina, it became in 1986 the archiepiscopal seat of the Archdiocese of Messina-Lipari-Santa Lucia del Mela.

In June 1947 Pope Pius XII granted it the status of a minor basilica.

Built by the Normans, it was consecrated in 1197 by the Archbishop Berardo. Henry VI, Holy Roman Emperor and Constance I of Sicily were present to witness the ceremony. The current building is the final result of some twentieth-century reconstructions, which took place following the disastrous earthquake that struck Messina in 1908 and the considerable damage that resulted from the heavy aerial bombardment in World War II.

Only the perimeter walls, the Gothic portal and an apse remained standing after the catastrophic earthquake which also destroyed surrounding edifices in Piazza Duomo. In 1943 incendiary bombs fell on the restored roof destroying much of its interior. Only an original mosaic and statue survived.

The tower houses the Messina astronomical clock, the largest astronomical clock in the world.

== History ==
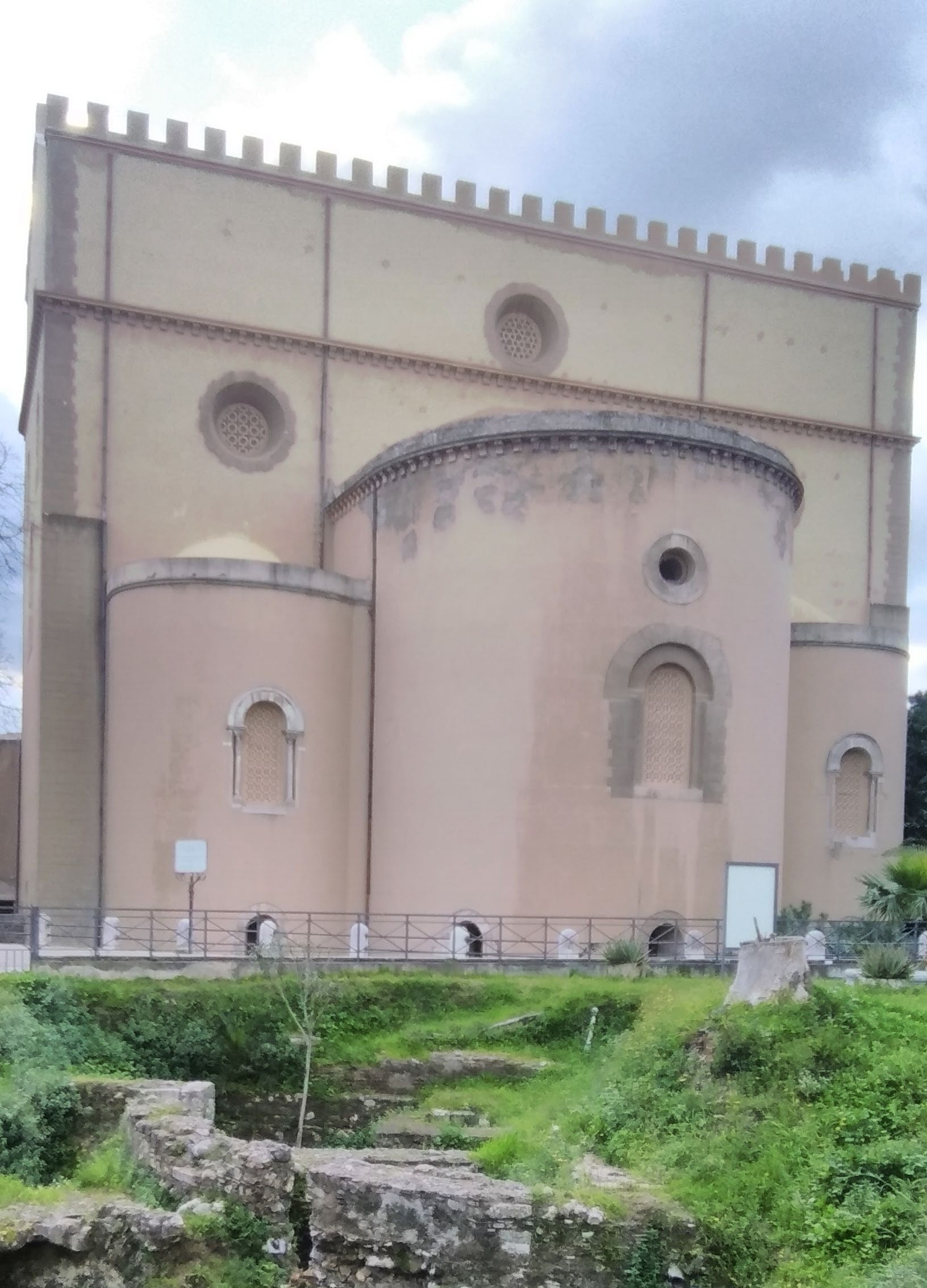
Apsidal section of the cathedral with Norman excavations

Various calamities—particularly earthquakes—have struck the city several times over the centuries, damaging or destroying many of its monuments. The bell tower of the Cathedral was no exception.

Since the 12th century, the tower has served primarily decorative and liturgical purposes. In fact, just a short walk upstream offers a panoramic view of the entire area of the Strait of Messina, with Calabria and a wide stretch of the Ionian Sea visible on the horizon.

- 1559 – The bell tower was struck by lightning and caught fire. It was rebuilt by Martino da Firenze, and further reconstruction work continued in 1564 under Andrea Calamech.
- Until 1678 – The base of the tower housed precious parchment documents chronicling the city's history. These were later transported to Spain, to the monastery of El Escorial, along with other artworks, following the end of the anti-Spanish revolt and the signing of the Peace of Nijmegen.
- 1693 – Severe damage occurred as a result of the twin earthquakes in the Val di Noto, which affected all of eastern Sicily in January.
- 1783 – A series of seismic shocks from the southern Calabria earthquake in February caused the collapse of the tower's upper levels.
- 1863 – In line with the changing architectural tastes of the time, the squat bell tower was demolished and replaced by two neo-Gothic towers, erected above the lateral apses.

The current bell tower was rebuilt on its original site following the devastating 1908 earthquake. Its design was based on that of the original structure.

Rising over 65 metres, the tower features a cusp-shaped roof and is lightened on all sides by pairs of mullioned windows with pointed arches. It houses an animated clock, commissioned in 1933 by Angelo Paino, the Archbishop of Messina, from the Ungerer company of Strasbourg.

This intricate system is considered the largest and most complex mechanical and astronomical clock in the world.

== Bells ==
The bell tower contains the largest concert in all of Sicily, consisting of 8 bells tuned according to the F#2 ascending major diatonic scale, all cast by the Colbachini foundry of Padua in 1929. The first, third and fifth bells are electrified in the fast Veronese style (without the possibility of going to the cup, however) while the others are fixed but are equipped with hammers. There are 2 other fixed bells, cast by Micheal Salicula in 1400. They were saved from the terrible Messina earthquake of 1908.

== See also ==
- 17th-century Western domes
