= Jean-Baptiste Schwilgué =

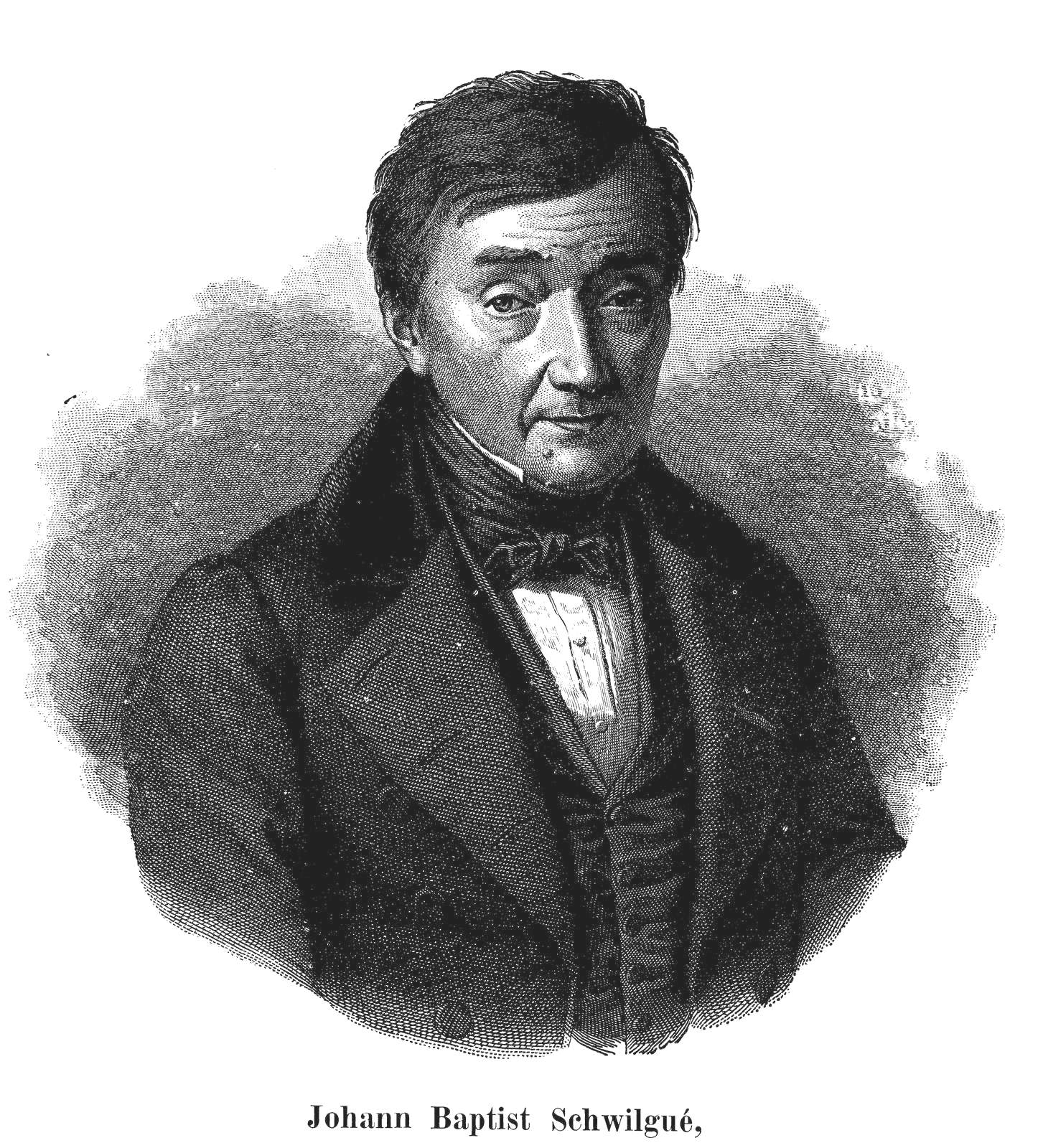
Jean-Baptiste Schwilgué.

Jean-Baptiste Schwilgué (1776–1856) was the author of the third astronomical clock of Strasbourg Cathedral, built between 1838 and 1843 (not 1842, as it is written on the clock itself). In 1844 Schwilgué, together with his son Charles, patented a key-driven calculating machine, which seems to be the third key-driven machine in the world, after that of Luigi Torchi (1834) and James White (1822).

He produced a number of clocks for church towers, of which the only one still functioning in Strasbourg is that of Saint Aurelia’s Church, Strasbourg. He was born and died in the same place, Strasbourg.

== Gallery ==
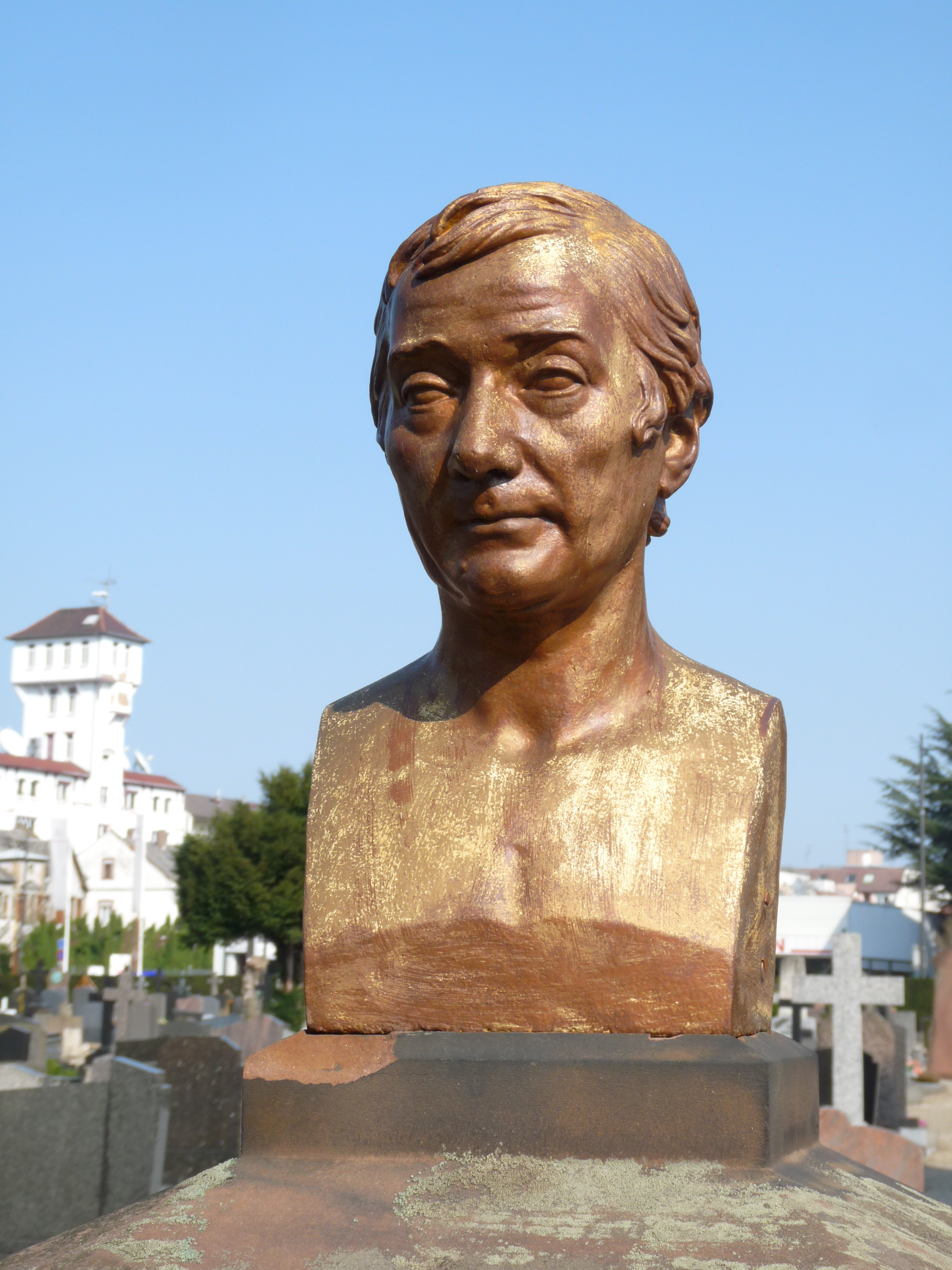
Bust of Jean-Baptiste Schwilgué

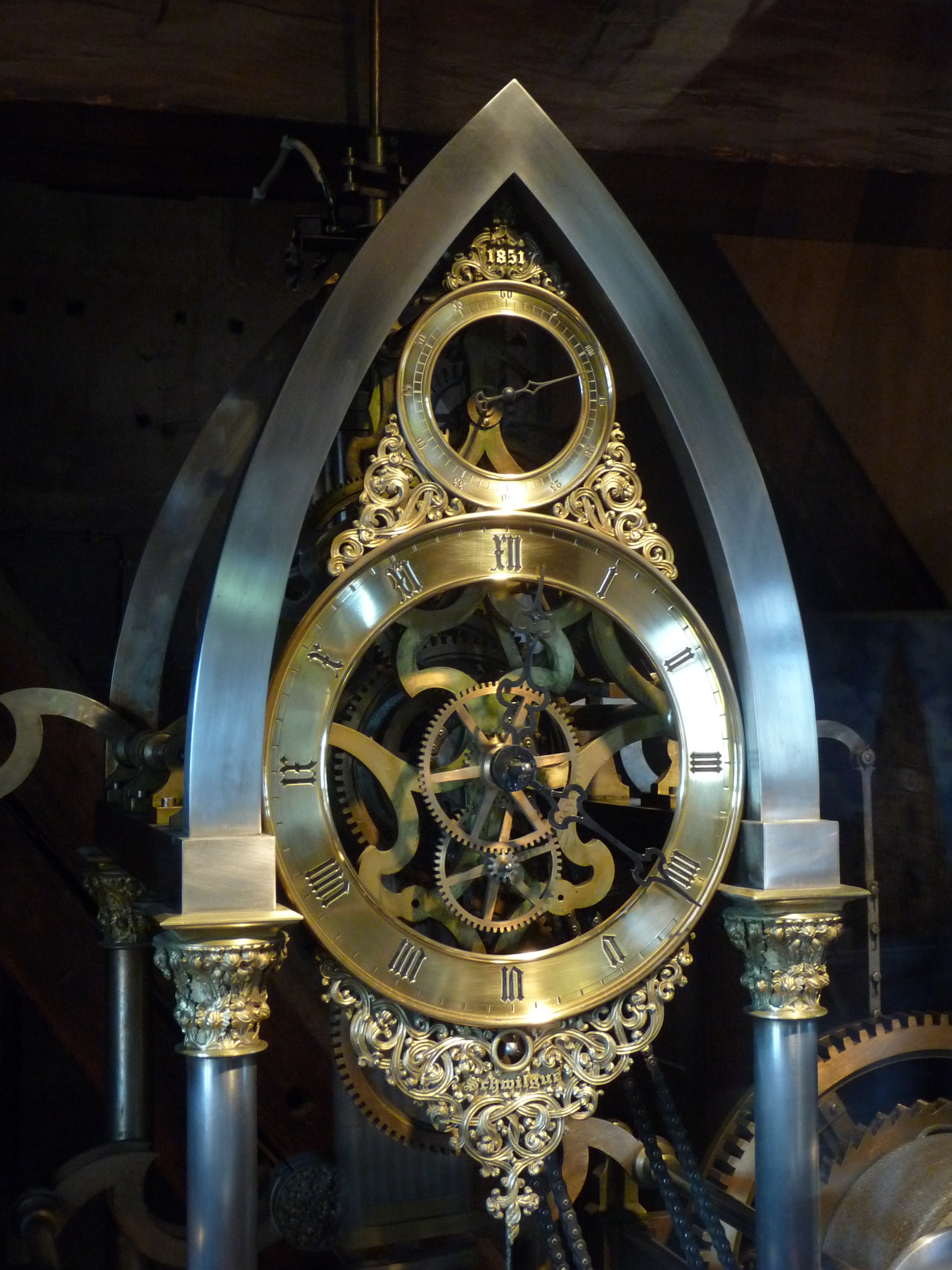
Clockwork of the Freiburg Minster (1851)
