= Saint Anthony Preaching to the Fish =

Painting of Anthony of Padua by Paolo Veronese

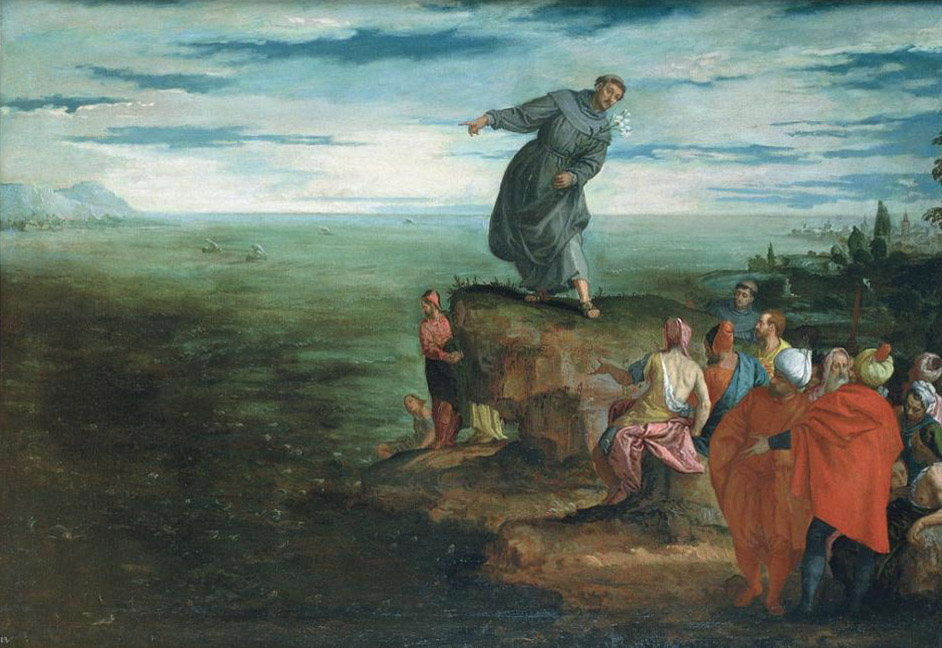
- Artist: Paolo Veronese
- Year: c. 1580–1585
- Medium: Oil on canvas
- Dimensions: 104 cm × 150 cm (41 in × 59 in)
- Location: Galleria Borghese, Rome

Saint Anthony Preaching to the Fish (Italian: Predica di sant'Antonio ai pesci; literally, Sermon of Saint Anthony to the Fishes) is a 1580–1585 oil-on-canvas painting of Anthony of Padua by Paolo Veronese, now in the Galleria Borghese in Rome. Its original location is unknown, though its medium dimensions of 104 centimetres (41 in) by 150 centimetres (59 in) mean it may have been painted for the side wall of a chapel or as part of a cycle of paintings for a small school (scuola) somewhere in Veneto. It entered the collection of Cardinal Scipione Borghese as a 1607 gift from Francesco Barbaro (patriarch of Aquileia).

== History and provenance ==
An existing letter from Barbaro to Borghese documents that Barbaro sent two paintings by Veronese to Borghese separately, though the letter does not describe the paintings in much detail. The letter does note the two paintings depict "sermons"; the Galleria Borghese has owned two paintings depicting sermons—the Saint John the Baptist Preaching and Saint Anthony Preaching to the Fish, both by Veronese—for quite some time. An account from a framer dated 25 July 1612 confirms the painting was located in Rome no later than 1612. Prior to their move to the Villa Borghese Pinciana (today's Galleria Borghese), the two "sermon" paintings had been placed at Palazzo Torlonia by 1613, when they were described in verse by the court poet Scipione Francucci.

In 1893 art historian Adolfo Venturi attributed the painting to Veronese. In 1897 art critic Giovanni Morelli contested this attribution, instead attributing the painting to Giovanni Battista Zelotti. Percy Herbert Osmond and Theodor Hetzer also attributed the painting to Zelotti, in 1927 and 1946, respectively. Their doubts were based on the painting's poor pictorial quality, though at the time it had not been properly restored. Subsequently, many art historians reattributed the painting to Veronese, including Roberto Longhi and Giuseppe Fiocco in 1928, Rodolfo Pallucchini in 1944, and Terisio Pignatti and Filipo Pedrocco in 1995.

The painting was treated or "restored" at least twice during the 20th century. In 1919 it was cleaned, with some small gaps plastered over and repainted, and its frame replaced. In 1947 the painting was washed and repainted. It is likely these restorations greatly obscured the painting's fine details—blurring it with a milky layer—as in 1648 Italian painter Claudio Ridolfi had described "fish [that] jump out of the water to hear [Saint Anthony] as if they understood him". These detailed fish were completely illegible prior to a June 2001 restoration.

In the most recent June 2001 restoration, the heavy varnish was removed, restoring light and color to the painting. A new thin protective varnish was applied by nebulization. Old fillings—which in many cases extended beyond the initial gaps—were removed, reducing the amount of retouching work needed. The existing frame was removed, as it did not allow for precise tensioning of the canvas. It was replaced by a new frame equipped with a traditional extension adjustment system. During the removal of the frame, the inscription "Paolo Veroneʃe" was discovered: it is not an original signature but functional information for the collector or art dealer.

== Description ==
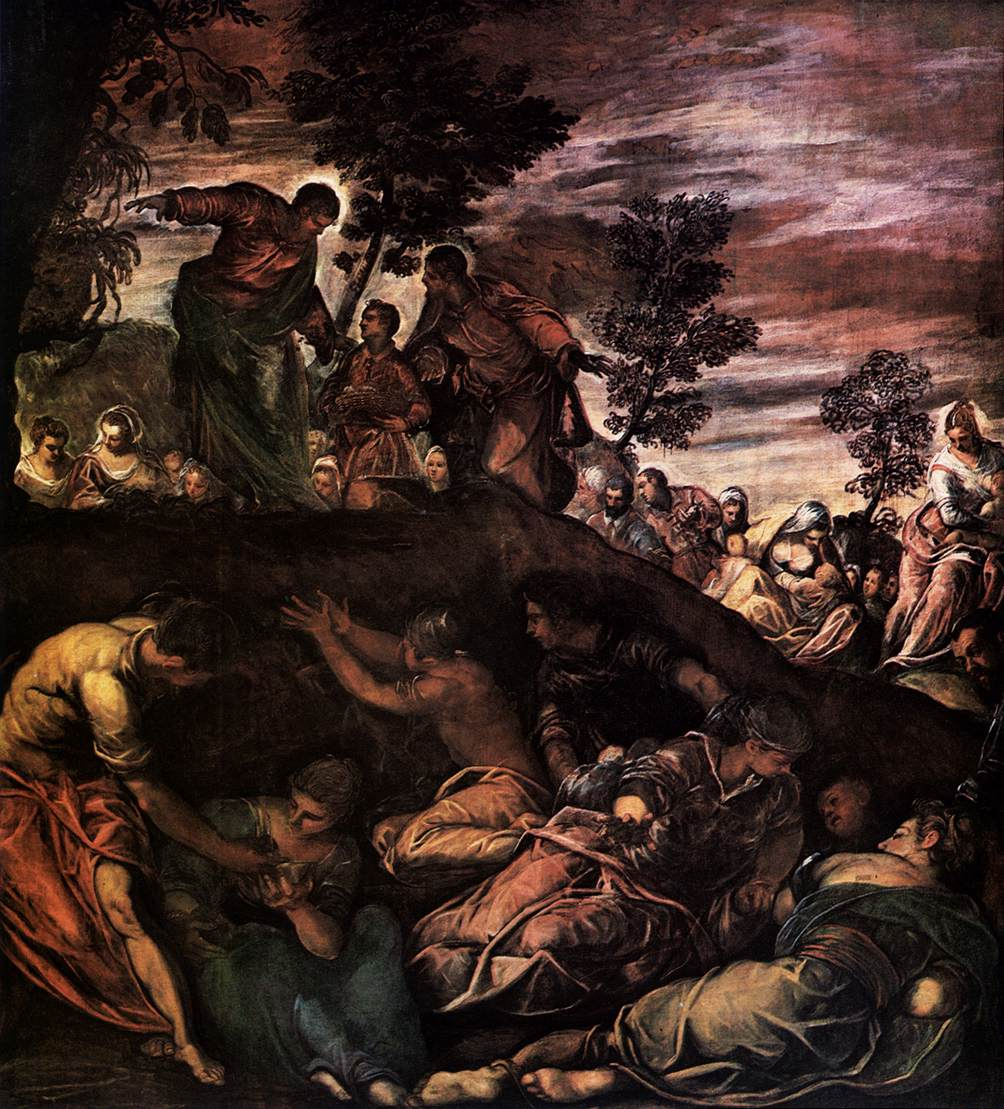
Moltiplicazione dei pani e dei pesci ("Multiplication of Bread and Fishes"), Tintoretto, c. 1579-1581, Scuola Grande di San Rocco, Venice

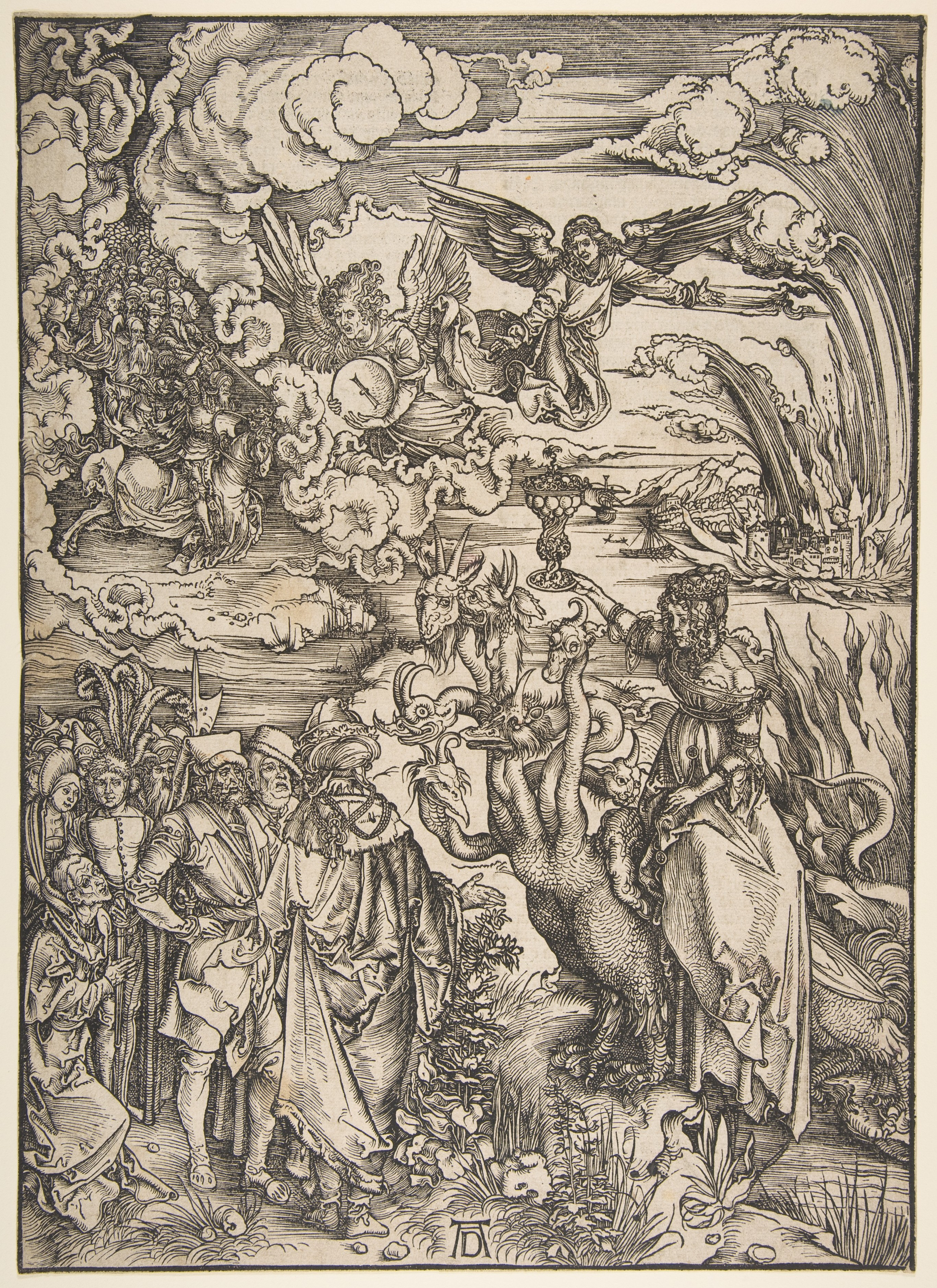
The Whore of Babylon, Albrecht Dürer, 1498, Metropolitan Museum of Art, New York

Compositionally, the painting is oriented horizontally. From left to right it is split into two halves. The left half contains mostly dark blue-green sea and the fish within it, with boats and a mountainous shoreline visible in the distance at extreme center-left. The sea is calm. The painting's right half shows the Rimini coastline upon which Saint Anthony and a crowd of bystanders are gathered, with the city and spires of Rimini visible in the distance at extreme center-right. From top to bottom, the painting may be considered split into three parts. The top third is mostly blue sky with white clouds, though the figure of Saint Anthony also extends into this area. The bottom two-thirds depict the sea, shoreline, and crowd of bystanders.

Veronese places Saint Anthony atop a rock, raising him above the bystanders and focusing attention on his figure. The rock is almost triangular in shape, jutting out into space as if it were the prow of a ship, thereby implying Anthony is a helmsman guiding the church or serving as a beacon of faith. Anthony, dressed in light gray-blue robes and holding a bunch of white lilies, points down to the fish but is turned toward and looks at the human listeners with a somewhat serious or even castigating expression. Veronese painted Anthony taller than he should be relative to the bystanders—a perspectival anachronism—in order to increase the saint's monumental bearing. He is further accentuated by his asymmetric positioning relative to the overall canvas. Anthony's orientation toward the listeners appears to be inspired by that of Jesus in Tintoretto's circa 1579–1581 Multiplication of Bread and Fishes at the Scuola Grande di San Rocco in Venice.

Not including Anthony, there are at least sixteen distinguishable bystanders in the painting, with some dark shapes behind these sixteen figures suggesting an even larger crowd. Of these listeners, only one looks directly at Saint Anthony: this figure, dressed in yellow robes and with his right hand over his heart as a sign of devotion, is thought to be a self-portrait of Veronese. The other figures look either at each other or the fish in amazement. Some of them sit or lean on rock formations. Though the scene is meant to take place in Rimini, some of the figures appear to be non-Italian foreigners, including Turks, Jews, and a Moor. The two Turks in the bottom right corner of the foreground are dressed in striking reddish robes. The rightmost Turk has his back turned to the viewer and his face is not visible. He wears black boots and a yellow turban with a red cockade, addressing his compatriot while gesturing at the fish with his left arm. This figure may have been inspired by a similar one depicted in the bottom center of the 1498 Albrecht Dürer engraving The Whore of Babylon. The leftmost Turk wears a white turban and looks toward the fish incredulously or in amazement.

Like the Turks, the figures thought to be Jews are arguing amongst themselves and pointing to the fish. They are identified as Jews because their headdresses are similar in appearance to ones used in Veronese's later painting Christ among the Doctors, which depicts Jesus in discussion with the rabbis. Other notable figures in Saint Anthony Preaching to the Fish include a white-bearded elderly man visible in between the two red-robed Turks who looks directly at the viewer—as if to pity the common state of sinners—and may be a portrait of Tintoretto; at far right, a restless-looking child tugging at the dress of the bare-chested woman sitting next to him; and to the right of Anthony, a friar also wearing a light blue robe who is half hidden by the rock and lowers his eyes, overwhelmed. Across from the friar to Anthony's left, another three figures are visible near the shoreline: the leftmost figure sits right at the edge of the shore and looks up either at their adjacent bearded companion or Anthony; the middle figure is a bearded man dressed in red and black standing and looking down at the fish; and the last leftmost figure is completely obscured by the rock except for their footwear and the hem of their yellowish robe.

== Analysis ==
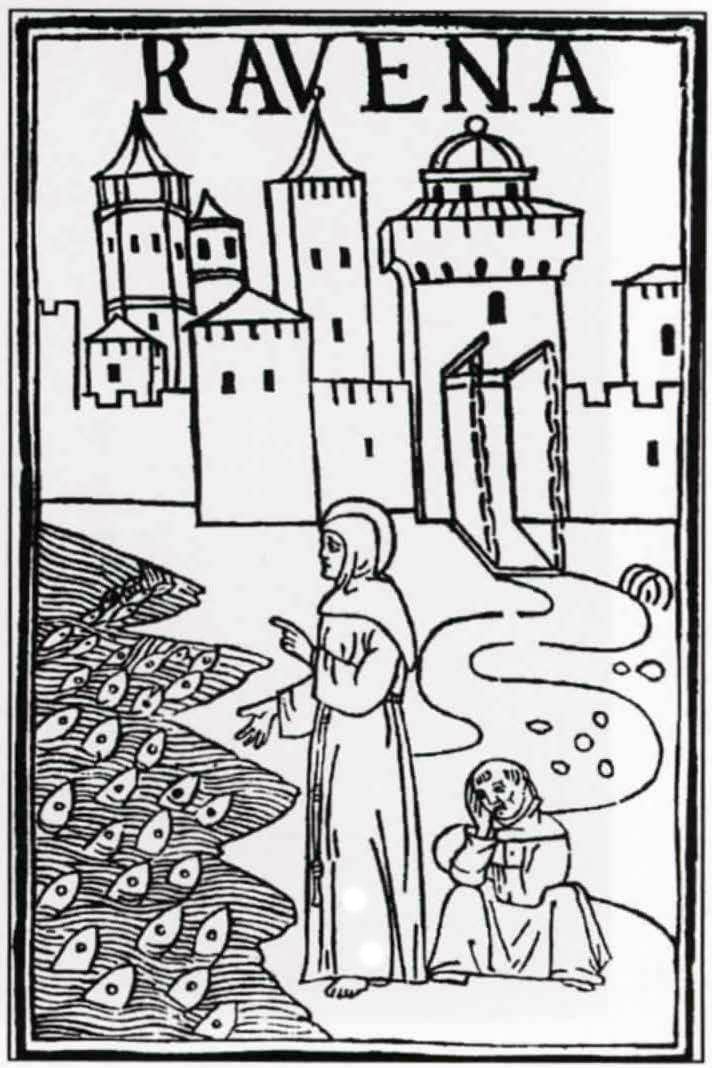
Sant'Antonio predica ai pesci ("Saint Anthony preaches to the fish"), c. 1480, woodcut, Museo Correr, Venice

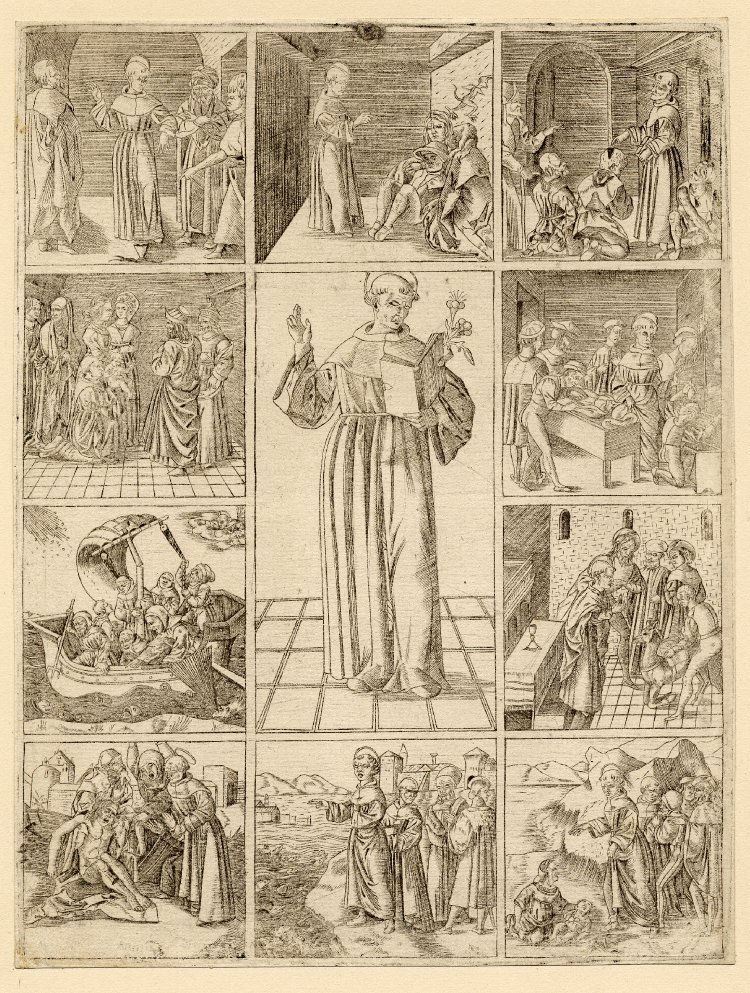
Miracoli di sant'Antonio ("Miracles of Saint Anthony"), Anonymous Paduan, c. 1510-1520, engraving, British Museum, London

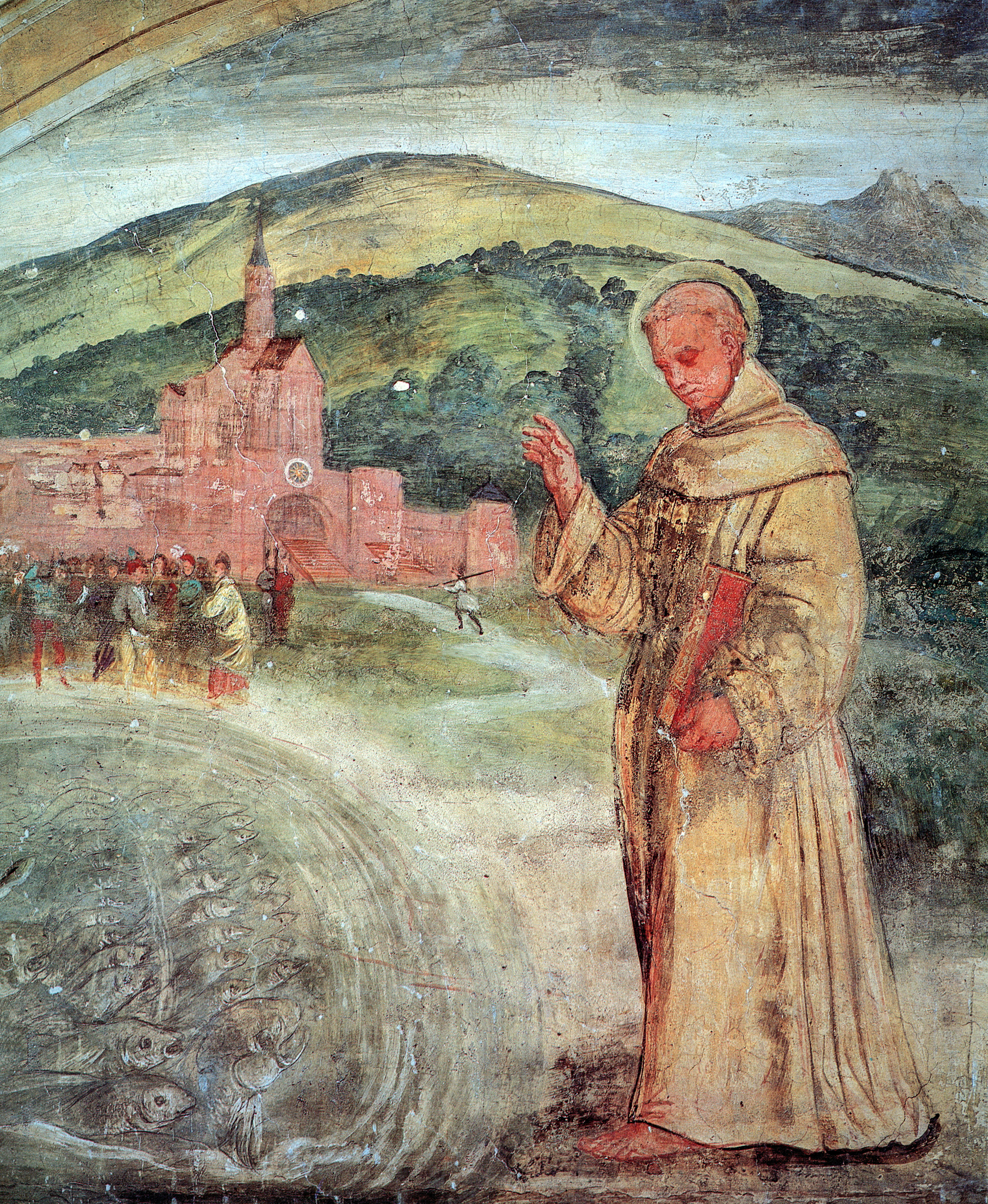
Predica ai pesci ("Preaching to the fish"), Girolamo Tesssari, c. 1535–1537, fresco (detail), Santuario del Noce, Camposampiero

Veronese completed this painting not long after he was interrogated by the Inquisition in Venice on suspicion of heresy. The inquisitors considered Veronese's depiction of the Last Supper inappropriately sumptuous and festive, and they forced him to alter his painting into one of The Feast in the House of Levi. This may help explain Veronese's choice of subject matter in Saint Anthony Preaching to the Fish, including his humbling self-portrait, the sympathetic portrait of Tintoretto, and the sumptuous treatment of the bystanders.

Representations of the sermon to the fish—though not unprecedented before Veronese—are rare in Antonian iconography. Any such representations are usually included as part of larger cycles showing multiple events or miracles in Saint Anthony's life, rather than being standalone works. Some examples perhaps known to Veronese include a 1520 work located in the ante-sacristy of the Basilica of Saint Anthony of Padua and attributed to Gian Martino Tranzapani; the 1535–1537 half lunette fresco by Girolamo Tessari located at the Santuario del Noce in Camposampiero; and a 15th-century cycle by Domenico Morone at San Bernardino, Verona, which was likely still extant during Veronese's lifetime. Since it no longer exists, it is unknown for certain whether Morone's cycle depicted the sermon to the fish. Other known depictions of Saint Anthony preaching to fish include an anonymous 1480 woodcut indicating the sermon occurred in Ravenna (rather than in Rimini), and a circa 1510–1520 engraving probably of Paduan origin with ten panels illustrating Anthony's miracles, including the sermon to the fish. An image of the sermon also appears in the frontispiece of the Compendio volgare della vita & miracolose opere di Santo Antonio ("Vulgar Compendium of the life & miraculous works of Saint Anthony") by Ippolito da Ponte, printed in Venice in 1532.

Although representations of the sermon were less widespread than those of other Antonian miracles, the event had a certain fame. Even before Ippolito da Ponte's publication it was extensively treated in Chapter 40 of The Little Flowers of St. Francis, where it is placed firmly in Rimini. Previous writings gave no precise location for the sermon. According to legend, Anthony of Padua was preaching in Romagna to Cathar heretics, who initially rebuffed him. Anthony preached instead to the fish, after which many people came to witness the miracle and hear the sermon. The legend derives from and is related to Francis of Assisi's Sermon to the Birds, which was itself a common theme in religious paintings: one example of many is the circa 1290–1295 Giotto painting Predica agli uccelli ("Sermon to the Birds").

Curiously, the expedient of placing Anthony on a rock or otherwise well above the bystanders is not used in any of the depictions Veronese may have known. It was used as early as the 14th century in stained glass windows at the Basilica of Saint Francis of Assisi, and in the early 1500s by Girolamo Santacroce at the Altar of Saint Anthony in Sant'Anna dei Lombardi Church in Naples, but it is highly unlikely Veronese ever saw either work.
