= Scuola del Santo =

Historic place in Padua, Italy

Coordinates: 45°24′3.564″N 11°52′48.504″E

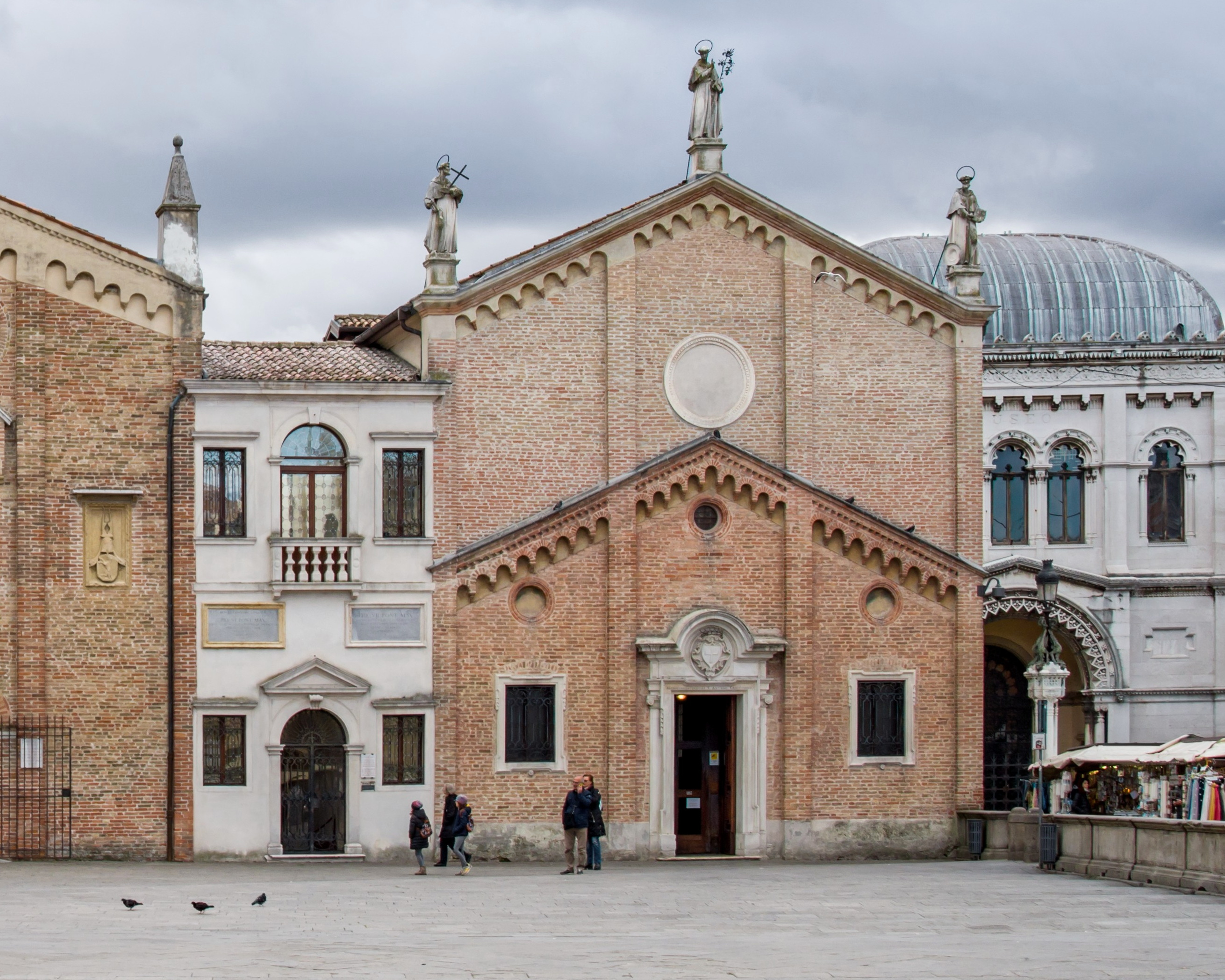
La facciata, a sinistra il scalone di 1736

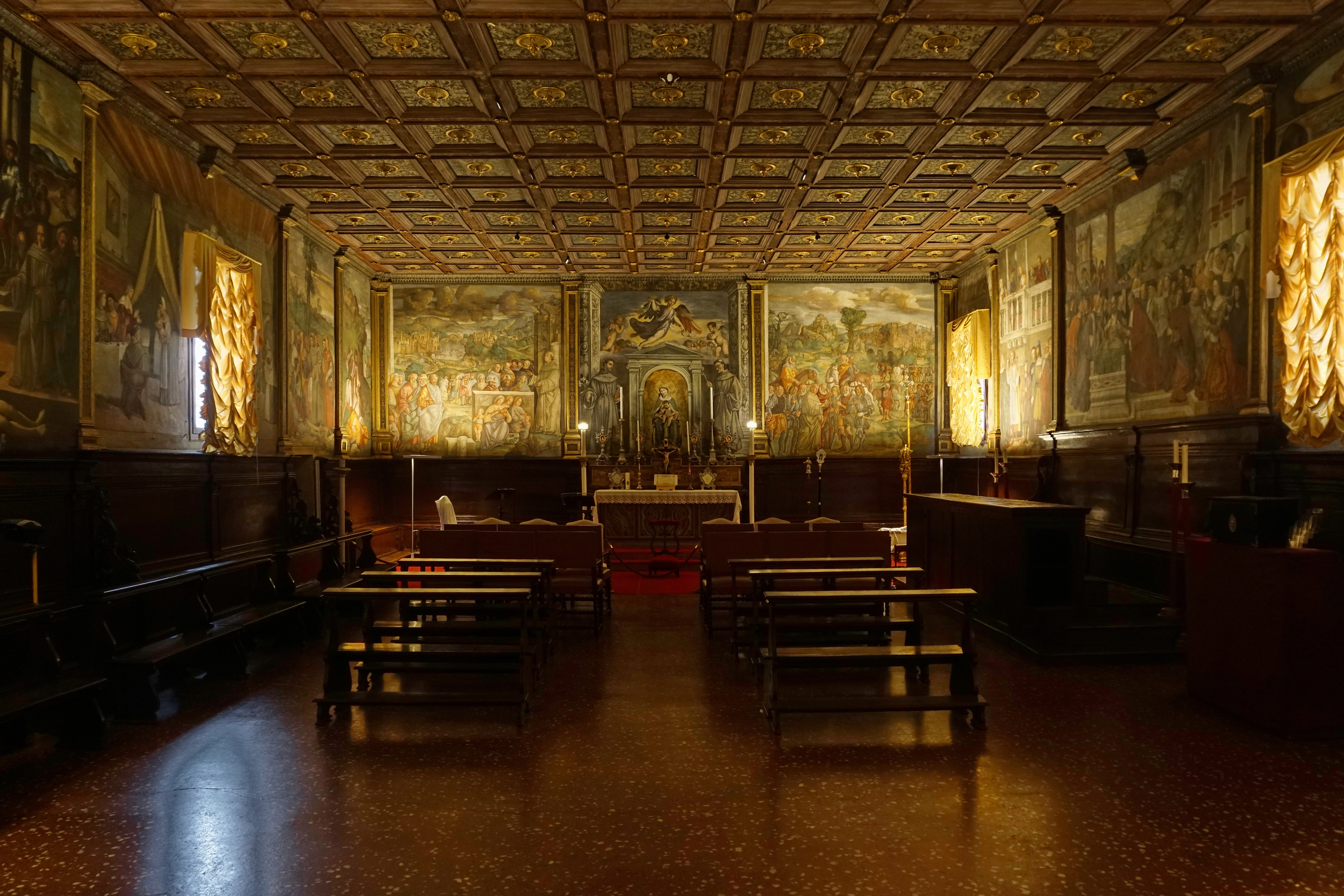
Interno della Scuola del Santo: la sala delle adunanze.

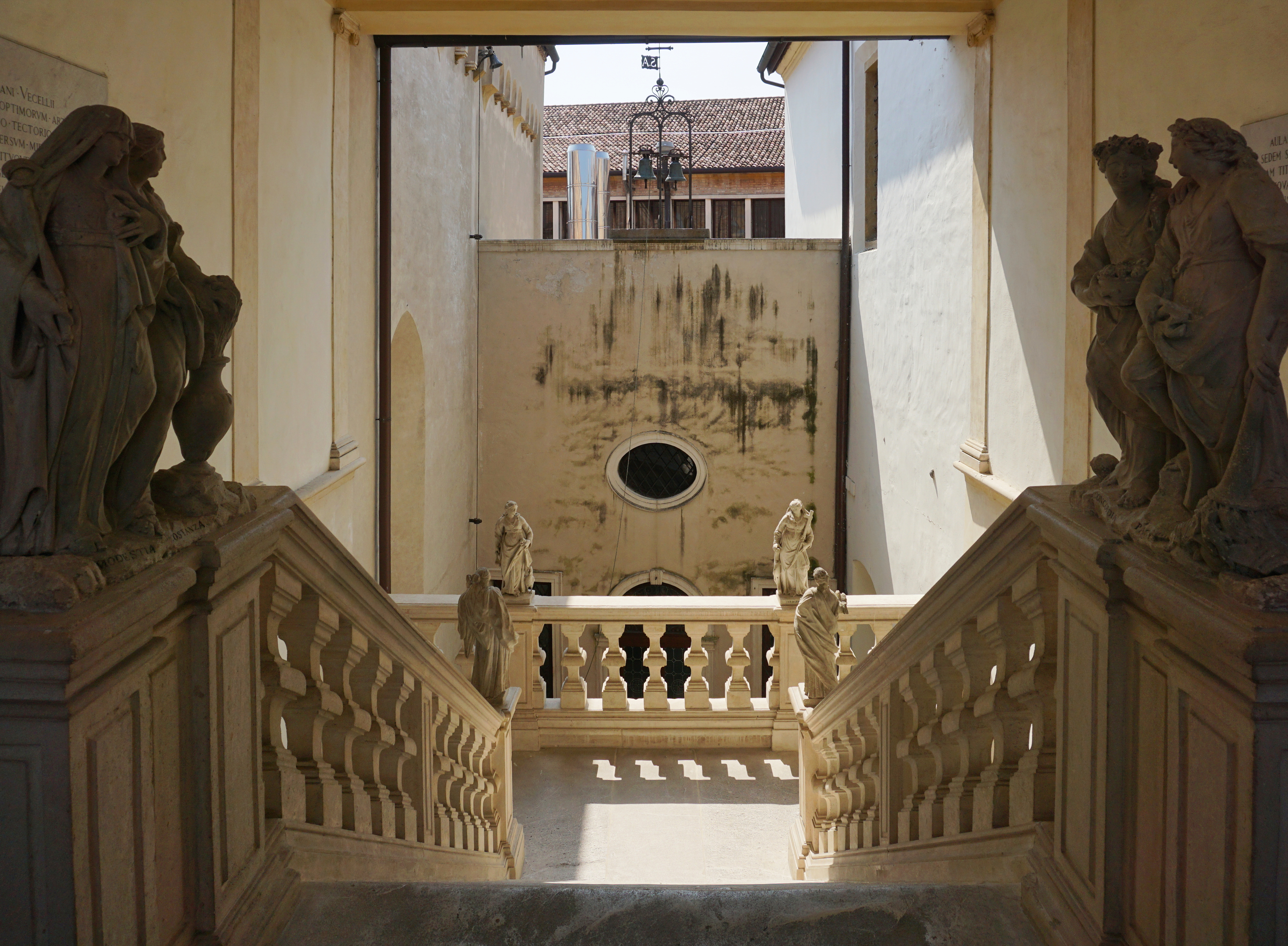
Staircase by Giovanni Gloria (1736)

The Scuola del Santo or Scoletta was the headquarters of the Archconfraternity of St Anthony of Padua. It overhangs the churchyard of Basilica of Saint Anthony of Padua, next door to the St. George's Oratory.

The Confraternity built the Scoletta in 1427 and it was expanded in 1504 with an upper floor consisting of the Sala Priorale (prior's room) decorated with a cycle of fifteen frescoes and three canvases, which were worked on by the young Titian between 1510 and 1511. He was entrusted with three frescos of miracles performed by Anthony of Padua, The Miracle of the Newborn, The Miracle of the Healed Foot and The Miracle of the Jealous Husband. The three large frescoes were painted by him between April and December 1511 in the main room of the Scuola del Santo – they were his first large-scale independent work. The raised arm of the wife in Husband is sculpted in relief rather than painted illusionistically.

== History ==
The Archconfraternity began a few years after St Anthony's death and grew rapidly. During the 13th century its brothers used the Sala del Capitolo as their meeting room, then the Cappella della Madonna Mora. In the 15th century it decided to construct a new building on the edges of the churchyard of the Basilica of Sant'Antonio.

Today's Scuola is made up of the chapel on the ground floor (1427–1431) and the meeting room upstairs (1504).

In 1736 the architect Giovanni Gloria built a small building linking the Scuola to the Oratory, with an elegant staircase connecting it to the meeting room. Visiting Padua Pope Pius VI in 1782, Pius VII in 1800, and John Paul II in 1982 blessed the crowd from the small balcony overlooking Piazza del Santo. On the landing is a 15th century tempera on panel painting by an unknown artist showing St Anthony Intending to Write, in poor condition. The Sala priorale has a coffered ceiling by Giovanni Cavalieri, painted by Domenico Bottazzo between 1506 and 1510, making it contemporary with the wooden wall paneling, the wardrobes and drawers by Girolamo da Piacenza. Gilded wooden frames subdivide the painted scenes.

== List of works ==
North wall, counter-clockwise

1. down below, next to the door: Francesco Vecellio, brother of Titian (attributed to), Nicola da Stra, Guardian of the Archconfraternity, handing out blessed bread (1511)
2. Titian, Miracle of the Newborn (1511)
3. Francesco Vecellio (attributed to), Saint Anthony Reveals the Usurer's Heart Inside the Strongbox (1512)
4. Gerolamo Tessari (attributed to), The Mule Prostrating Itself Before the Blessed Sacrament (1515)

West wall

1. Filippo da Verona, Sant'Antonio Appears to the Blessed Luca Belludi, Preaching the Immediate Liberation of Padua from the Rule of Ezzelino
2. Gerolamo Tessari, Transit of Saint Anthony (1513)
3. Bartolomeo Montagna, Canonical Recognition of the Remains of St Anthony (1512)
4. Gerolamo Tessari, Miracle of the glass beaker (1511)

South wall

1. Giovanni Antonio Requesta detto il Corona, Saint Anthony confronts the tyrant Ezzelino in Verona (1510–1511)
2. Domenico Campagnola, Saints Anthony and Francesco (1520), reworked by Domenico Frezelin. On the altar: Briosco, polychromed terracotta Madonna and Child (1533)
3. Giovanni Antonio Requesta (il Corona), Saint Anthony Reaches Padua, Where He Brought Peace Among the Citizens by the Force and Sweetness of his Preaching (1509)

East wall

1. Titian, Miracle of the Jealous Husband (to the right is the penitent man kneeling at the saint's feet) (1511)
2. Titian, Miracle of the Healed Foot (1511)
3. Gerolamo Tessari (attributed to), Saint Anthony Raises from the Dead a Child Who Had Fallen into Boiling Water (1524, divided in two parts by the window)
4. Bartolomeo Montagna (attributed to), Resurrection of a Young Man Assassinated for Attesting to the Innocence of his Father (16th century)
5. Antonio Buttafuoco, Death of St Anthony (1775)
6. Domenico Campagnola (attributed to), Resurrection of a Drownd Girl (16th century)
7. Giovan Maria Frangipane (attributed to), St Anthony Raises a Drowned Child from the Dead (1511)

Gallery of the prior's room

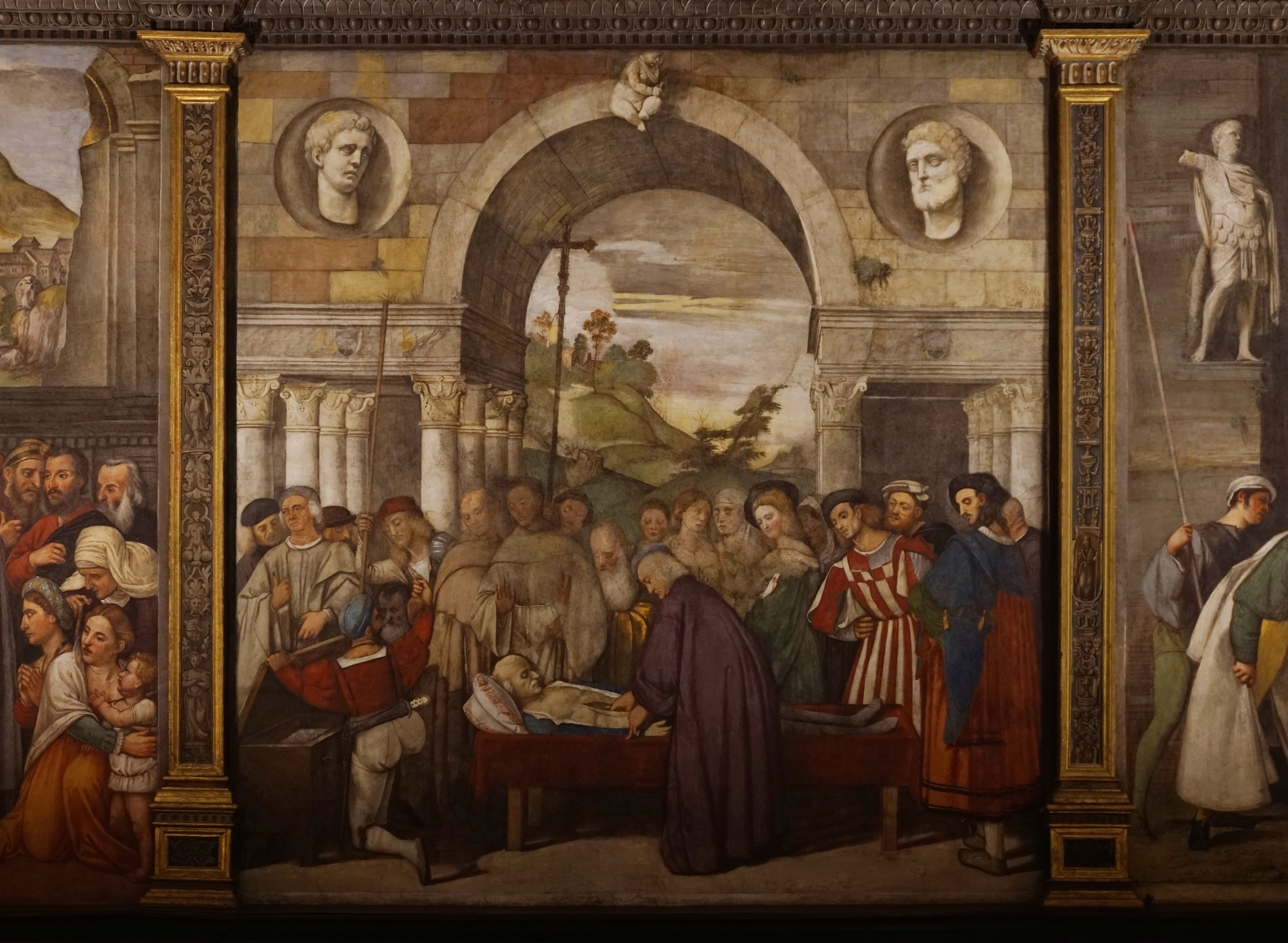
Francesco Vecellio (attributed to), St Anthony of Padua finding the usurer's heart in the coffin (1512)

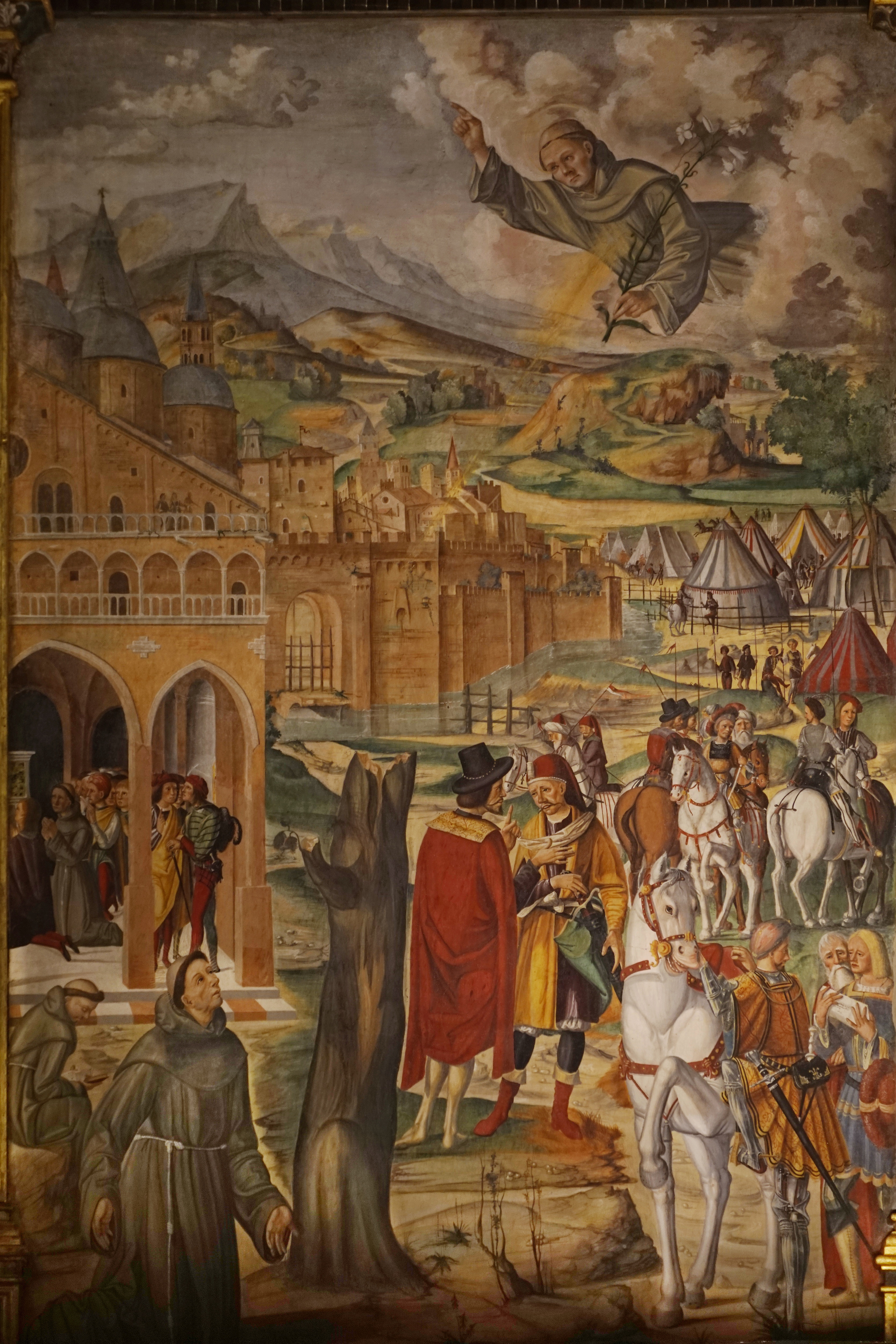
Filippo da Verona, Sant'Antonio appare al beato Luca Belludi (1510)

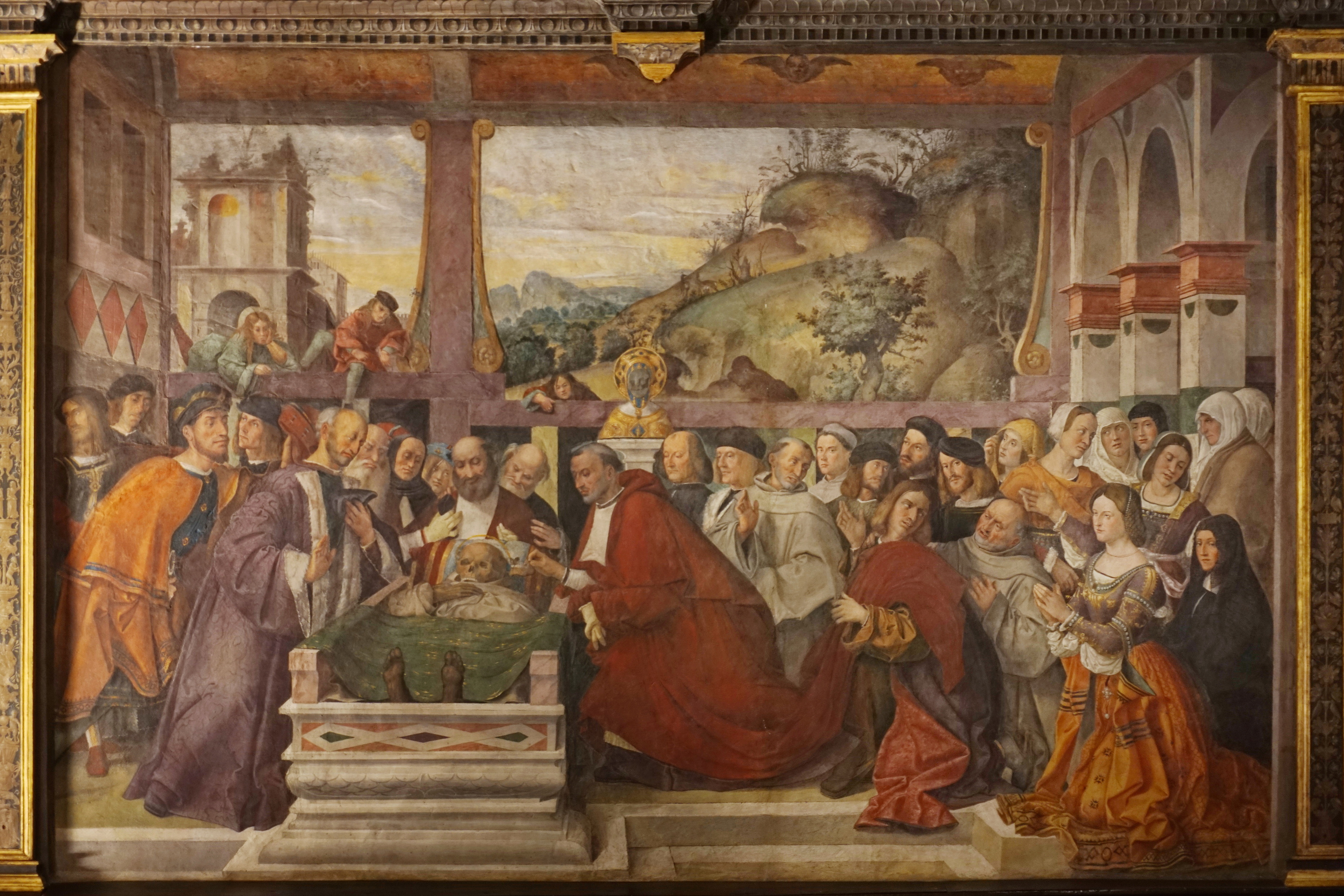
Bartolomeo Montagna, Ricognizione canonica delle spoglie di Sant'Antonio (1512)

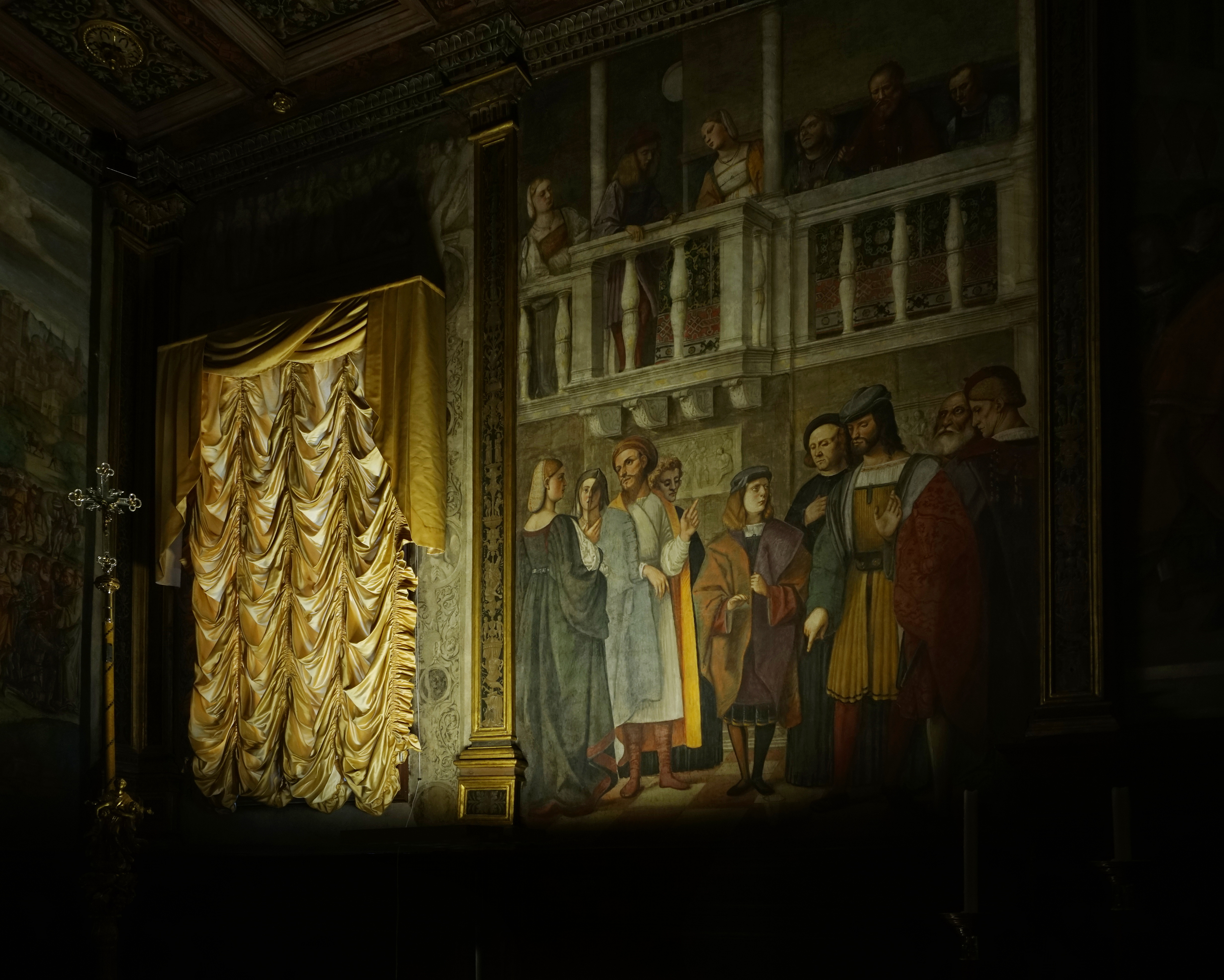
Girolamo Tessari, Miracolo del bicchiere di vetro

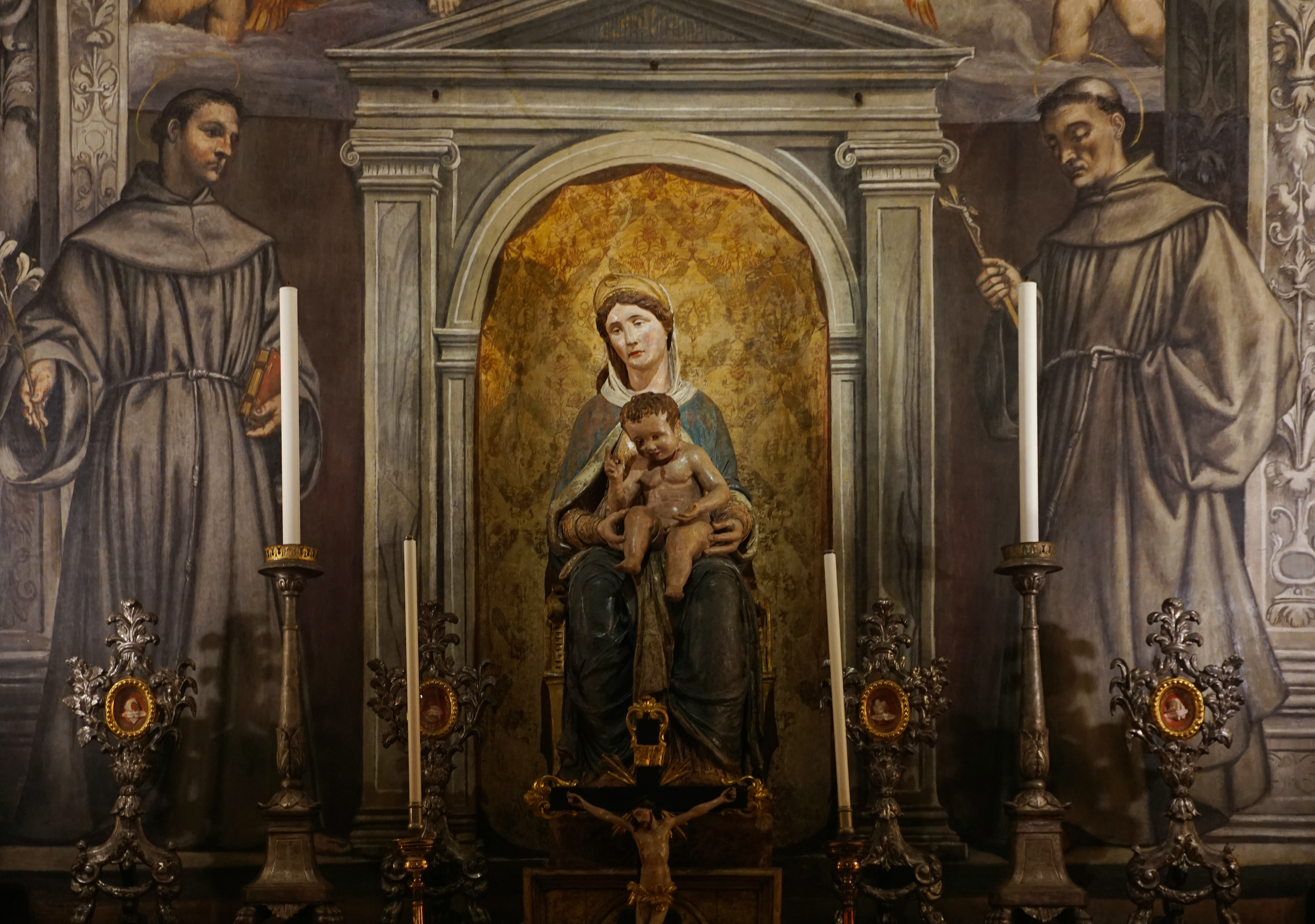
Madonna and Child attributed to Andrea Briosco (1533), Domenico Campagnola, Saints Anthony and Francesco (1520), reworked by Domenico Frezelin

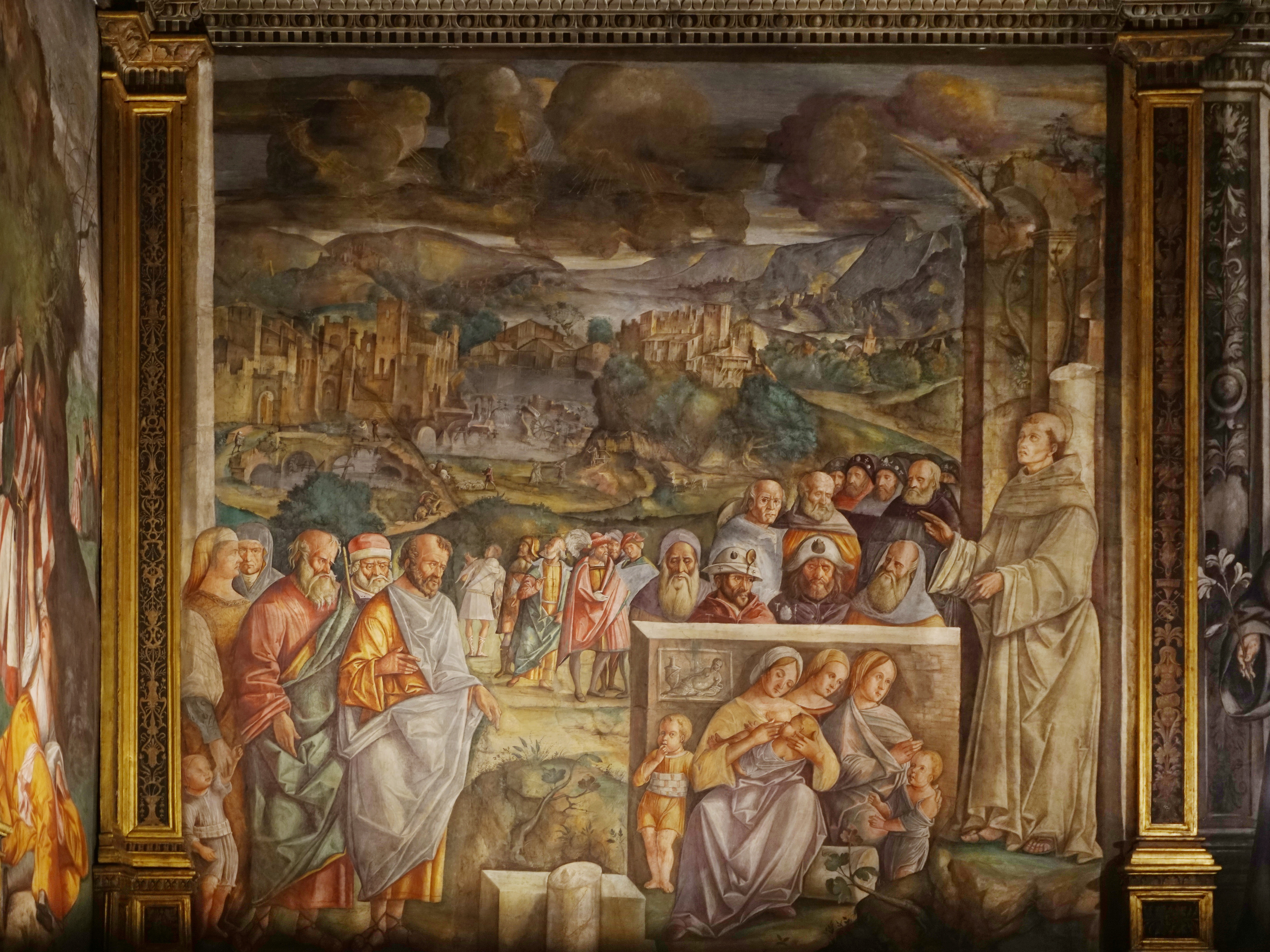
Giovanni Antonio Requesta, Saint Anthony Arriving in Padua, Where He Brought Peace Between the Citizens with the Force and Sweetness of His Preaching

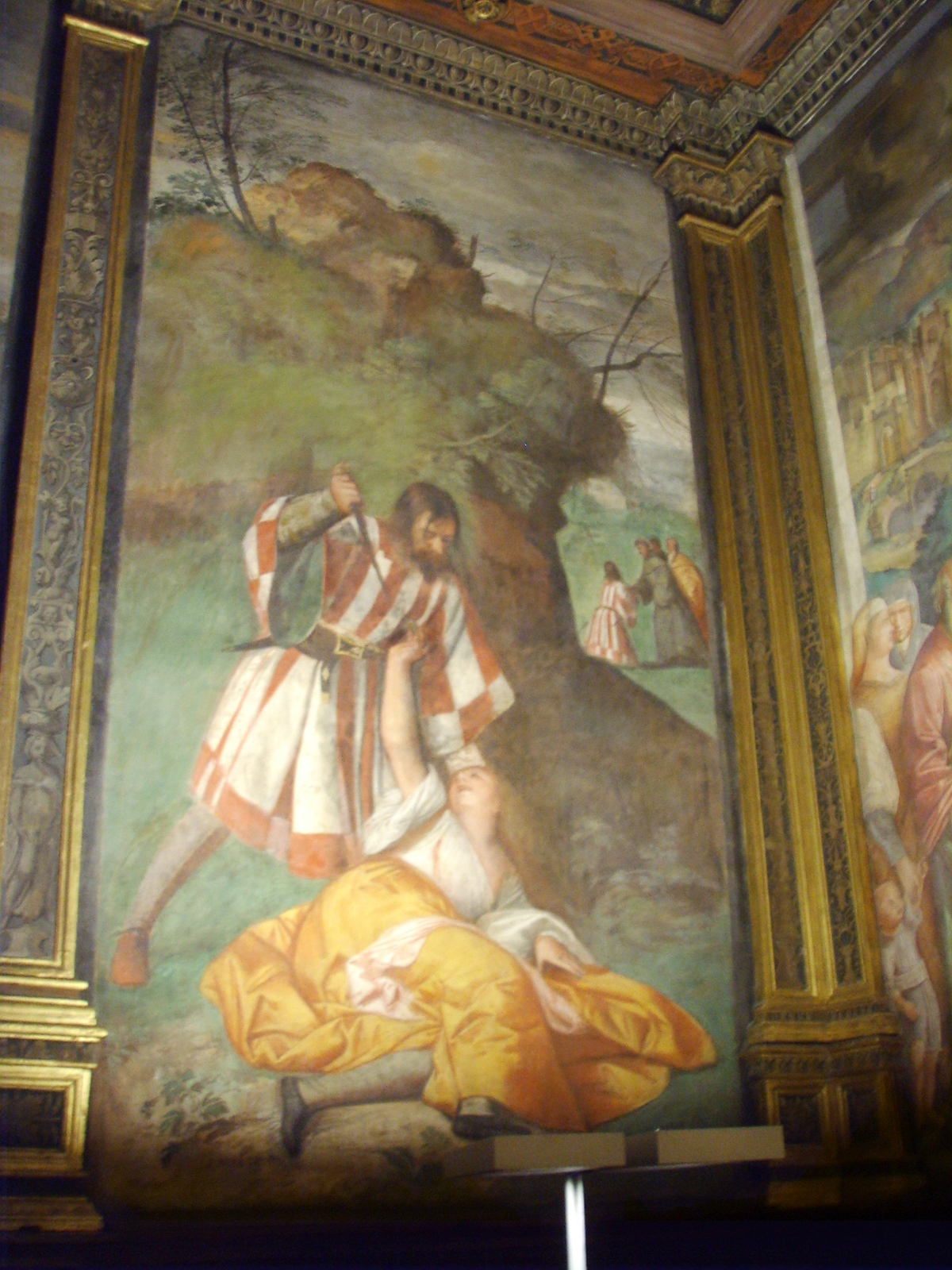
Titian, Miracle of the Jealous Husband (1511)

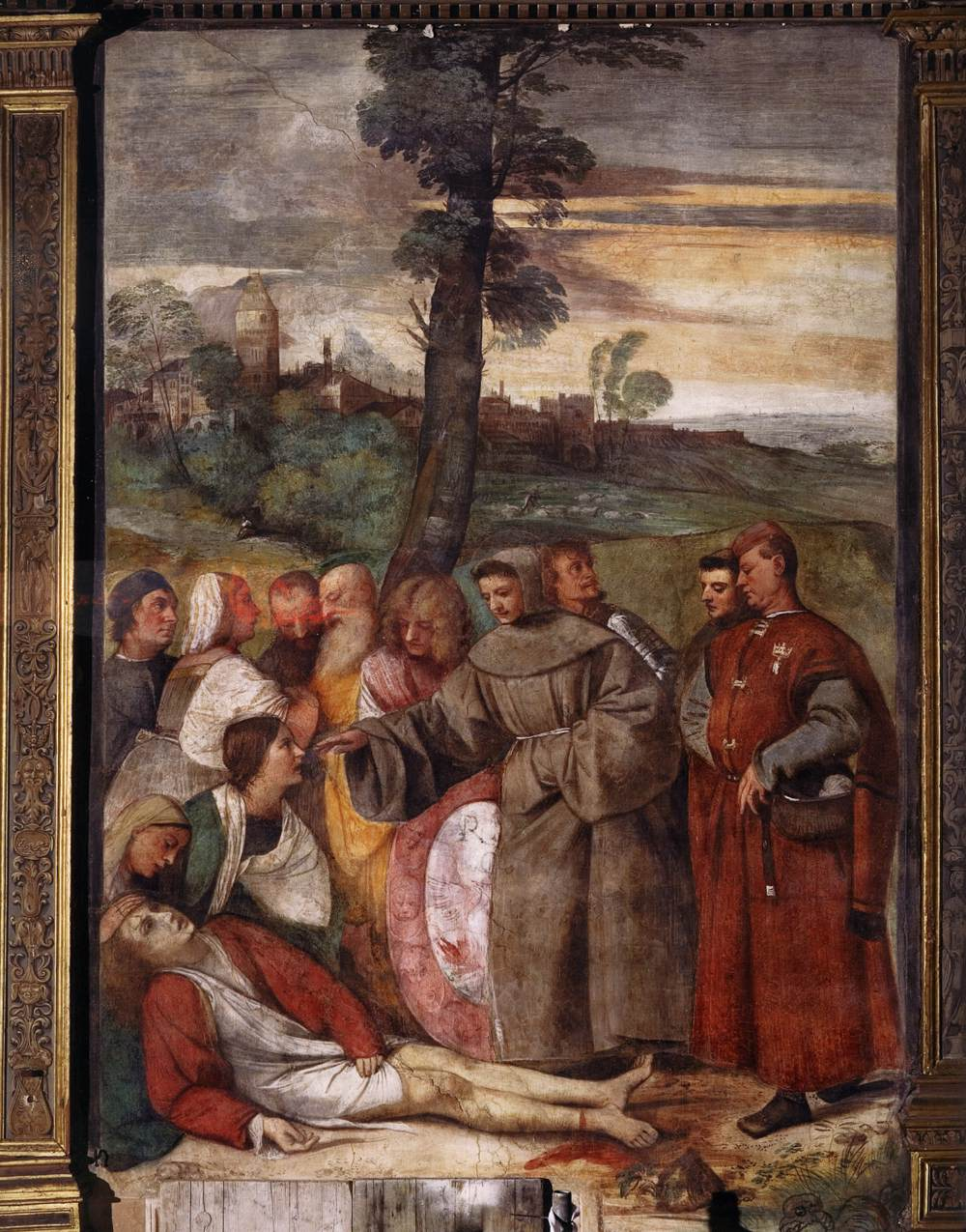
Titian, Sant'Antonio riattacca il piede a un giovane (1511)

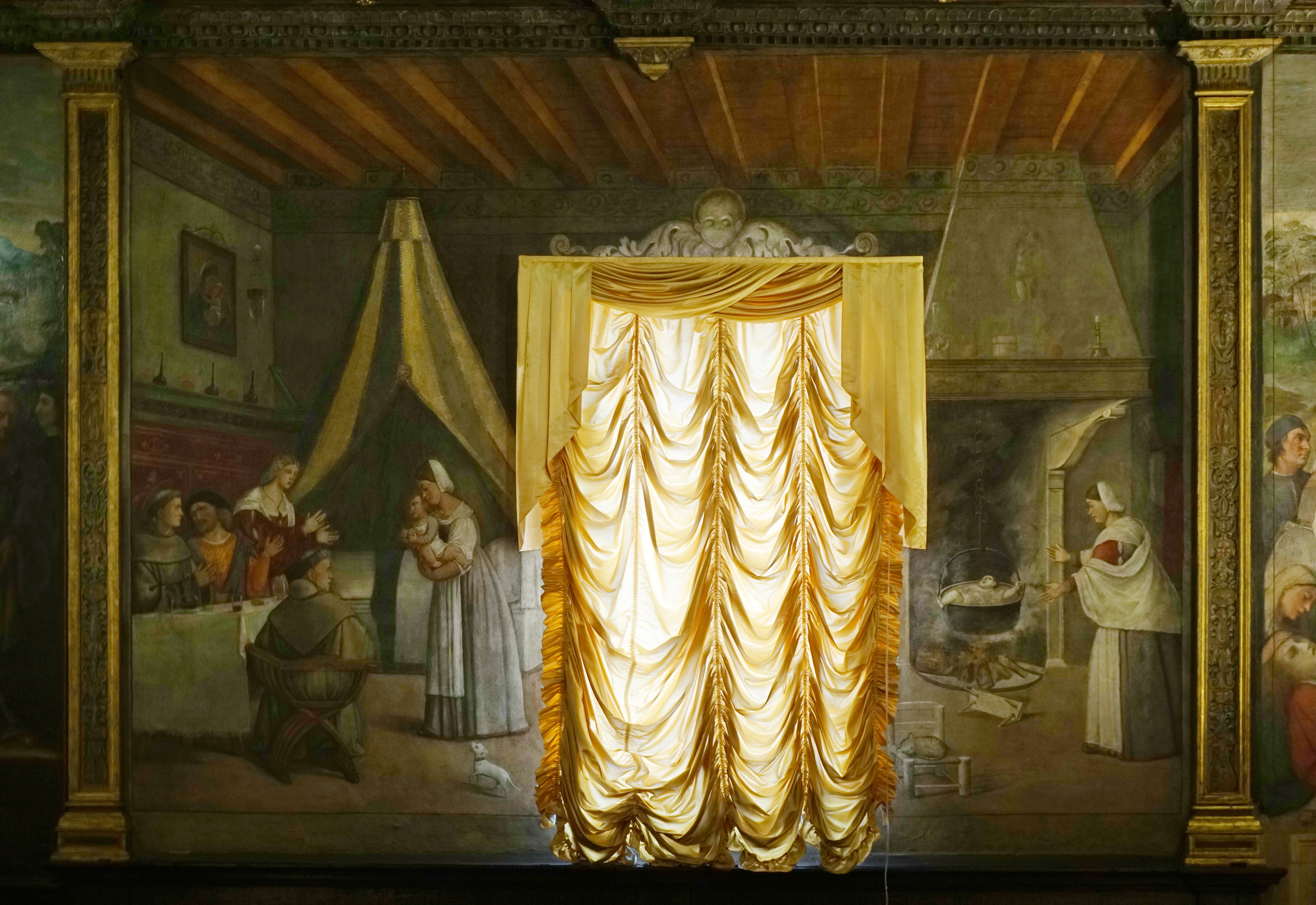
Gerolamo Tessari (attrib.), Sant'Antonio resuscita un bambino caduto nella pentola dell'acqua bollente (1524)

== Bibliography ==
- (in Italian) Fr. A. Sartori, L'Arciconfraternita del Santo, Padua 1955.
- Charles Hope: "The Attribution of Some Paduan Paintings of the Early Sixteenth Century", Artibus et Historiae, 1997, p. 81–99, JSTOR 1483540.
- Sergio Rossetti Morosini, "Tiziano Vecellio, Miracolo del marito geloso, 1511". In New findings in Titian's Fresco technique at the Scuola del Santo in Padua, The Art Bulletin, Volume LXXXI, Number 1 (March 1999).
- (in Italian) Leopoldo Saracini, La Scuola del Santo, Ed. Messaggero, Padua 2009.
- (in Italian) Vergilio Gamboso, La basilica del Santo di Padova – Guida storico-artistica, Messaggero di Sant'Antonio Editrice, Padua. ISBN 88-250-0023-5.
