= FC Union Pro Mogliano-Preganziol ASD =

Italian football club

Union Pro
- Full name: Football Club Union Pro 1928
- Founded: 2012; 14 years ago as, F.C. Union Pro Mogliano-Preganziol A.S.D. (merged); 2015; 11 years ago as, F.C. Union Pro 1928 (relocated)
- Ground: Stadio Comunale Arles Panisi, Mogliano Veneto, Italy
- Capacity: 2,300
- President: Enrico Lorenzoni
- Manager: Maurizio Bedin
- League: Eccellenza Veneto
- 2014–15: Serie D/C, 6th
Home colours	Away colours

Football Club Union Pro 1928, commonly referred to as Union Pro, is an Italian football club based in Mogliano Veneto and Preganziol, Veneto. It currently plays in Eccellenza Veneto.

== History ==
=== Foundation ===
The club was founded in 2012 after the merger of A.S.D. Pro Mogliano Calcio (founded in 1928) and ASD Union Preganziol (founded in 1962).

=== Serie D ===
In the season 2013–14 the team was promoted for the first time, from Eccellenza Veneto/B to Serie D.

== Colors and badge ==
The team's colors are white and blue.
