= Luca Belludi =

13th-century Franciscan friar

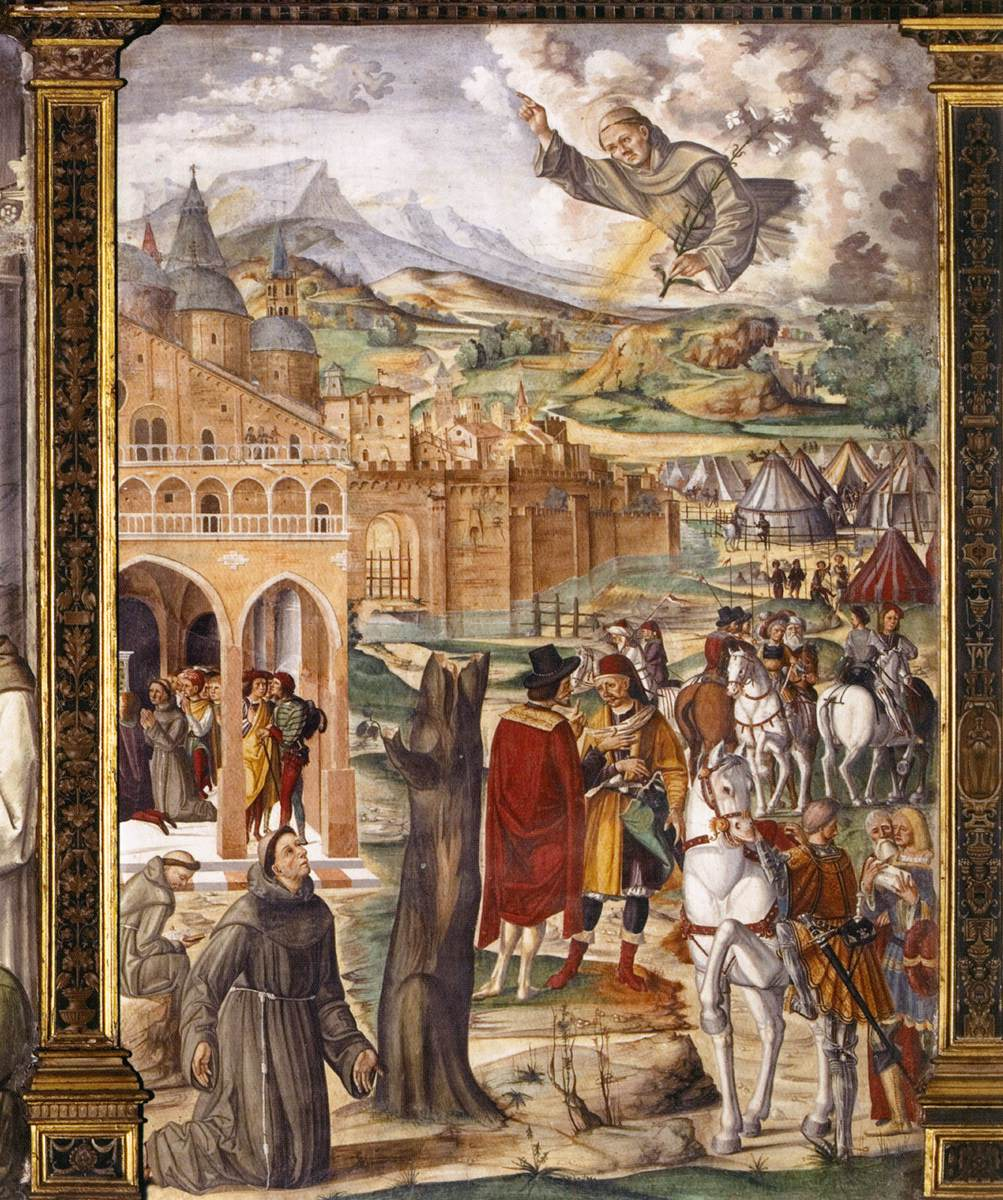
- St Anthony appearing to the blessed Luca Belludi preaching the immediate liberation of Padua from the rule of Ezzelino fresco by Filippo da Verona
- Born: between 1200 and 1210; Padua
- Died: 1286; Padua
- Venerated in: Roman Catholic church
- Beatified: 18 May 1927 by Pope Pius XI
- Major shrine: Padua, Church of Sant'Antonio, chapel of the blessed Luca
- Feast: 17 February
- Influences: Anthony of Padua
- Influenced: Anthony of Padua

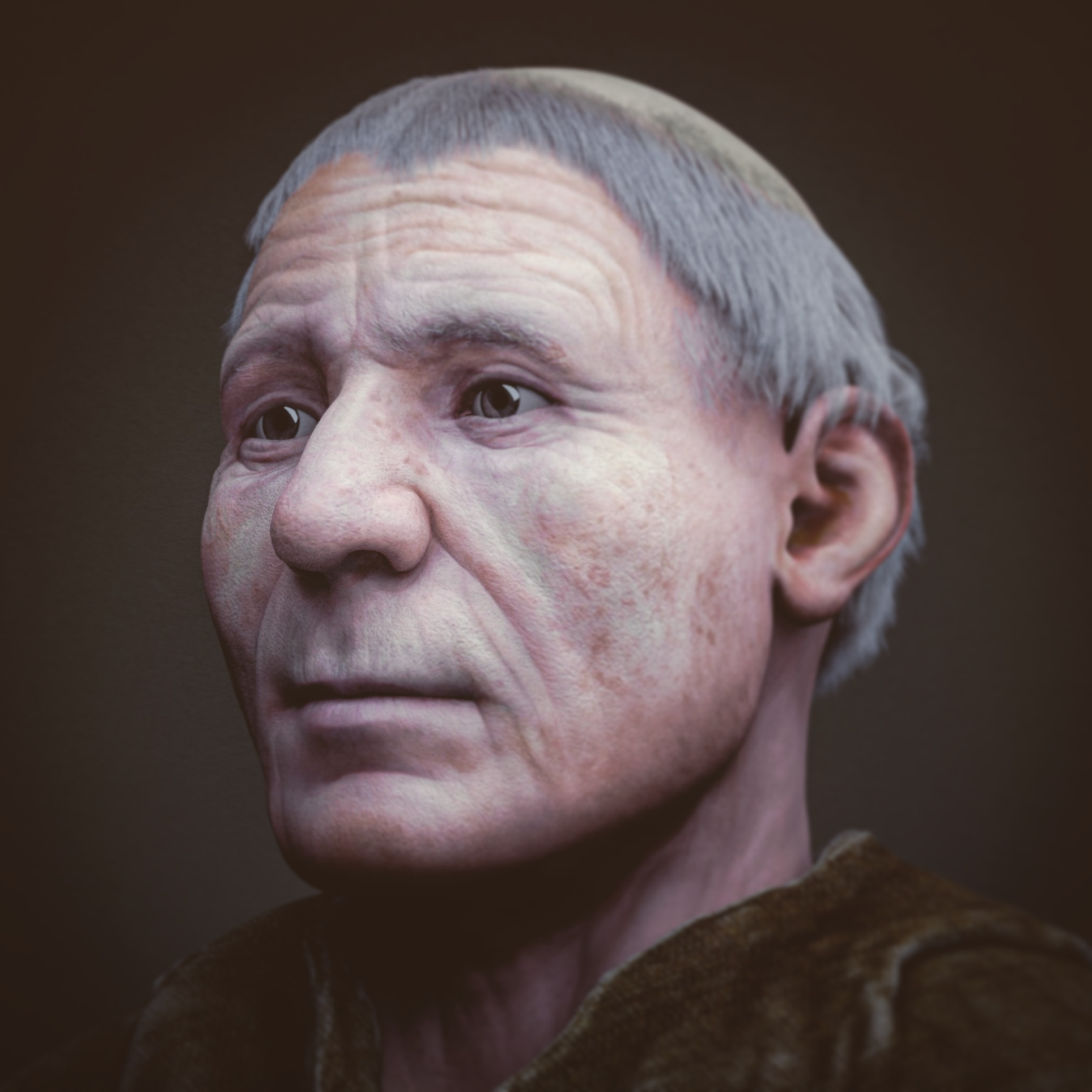
Luca Belludi – facial reconstruction

Luca Belludi (between 1200 and 1210 – 17 February 1286) was an Italian Franciscan friar from Padua.

Belludi is said to have been vested into the order by Francis of Assisi himself at age 25. He attended Padua University and was ordained priest in 1227. He became a close friend of Anthony of Padua, taking an active part in his prayers and assisting him to draft his sermons. Through prayer and the intercession of St Anthony (to whom he prayed after Anthony's death) he took part in the liberation of Padua from the tyrant Ezzelino III da Romano in 1256.

After Belludi's own death in Padua in 1286, his body was buried in the same urn as St Anthony – they remained there until 1971, when they were transported into a chapel now dedicated to him (also known as the chapel of Saints Philip and James the Less or the Conti Chapel), noted for its frescoes by Giusto de' Menabuoi. Pope Pius XI beatified him on 18 May 1927. The external cloister at Basilica of Saint Anthony of Padua is also now dedicated to Belludi.
