= Maurizio Bedin =

Italian football player

Personal information
- Date of birth: 9 February 1979 (age 47)
- Place of birth: Camposampiero, Italy
- Height: 1.80 m (5 ft 11 in)
- Position: Midfielder

Youth career
- Padova

Senior career*
Years	Team	Apps	(Gls)
1995–1997	Padova	9	(0)
1997–2002	Udinese	5	(0)
1999–2000	→ Monza (loan)	27	(0)
2000	→ Lecce (loan)	9	(0)
2001	→ Sampdoria (loan)	12	(0)
2003	Cosenza	20	(0)
2003–2007	Padova	97	(2)
2007	Martina	10	(0)
2008–2009	Pro Sesto	42	(0)
2009–2012	SPAL	76	(1)
2012–2013	Giorgione	24	(1)
2013–2014	Thermal Abano Teolo	31	(2)
2014–2017	Campodarsego	60	(3)
2017–2018	FC Spinea 1966		
2018–2019	Campodarsego	3	(0)
Total		425	(9)

Managerial career
- 2019–2024: Campodarsego (youth)
- 2024–2026: Campodarsego
- 2026: ASD Brian Lignano Calcio
- 2026–: Union Pro
- * Club domestic league appearances and goals

Maurizio Bedin (born 9 February 1979) is an Italian football coach and former footballer who is currently as a head coach for Union Pro.

== Honours ==
Udinese

- UEFA Intertoto Cup: 2000
