= Miracle of the Jealous Husband =

1511 painting by Titian

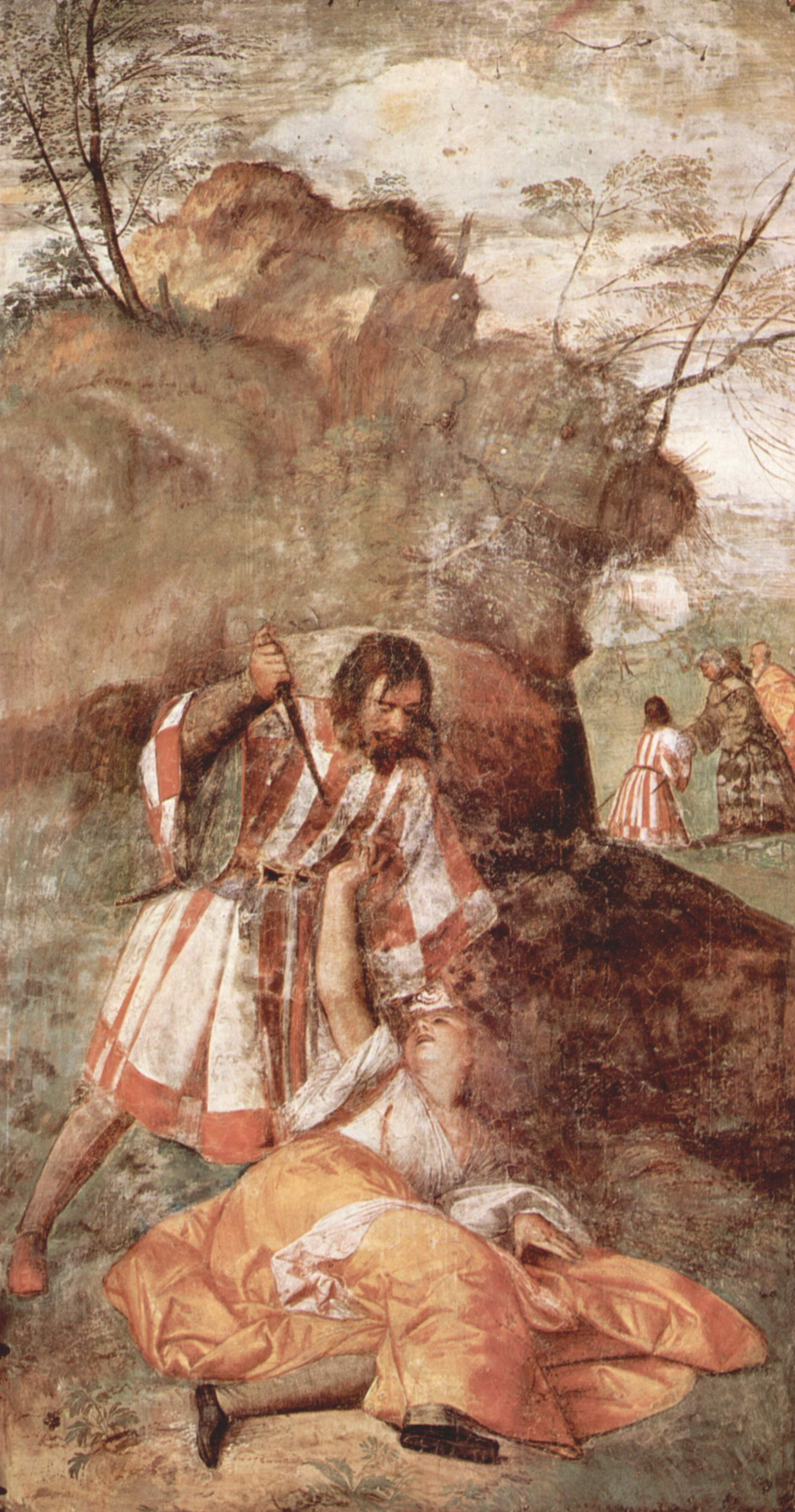
- Artist: Titian
- Year: 1511
- Type: Fresco
- Dimensions: 340 cm × 207 cm (130 in × 81 in)
- Location: Scuola del Santo; Padua

The Miracle of the Jealous Husband is a fresco by the Italian Renaissance master Titian, executed in 1511 as part of the decoration of the Scuola del Santo in Padua, northern Italy.

It portrays a man stabbing his wife after she has been unjustly accused of adultery. When the man discovers the truth, he begs for pardon to St. Anthony, who resuscitates the woman (this scene is portrayed in smaller size on the right). The idyllic background is inspired by Giorgione's paintings.

The young Titian described the volume of the wife's raised arm, in the center of the action, by actually sculpting it in relief rather than describing it illusionistically.

== See also ==
- List of works by Titian
