= Girolamo Tessari =

Italian painter

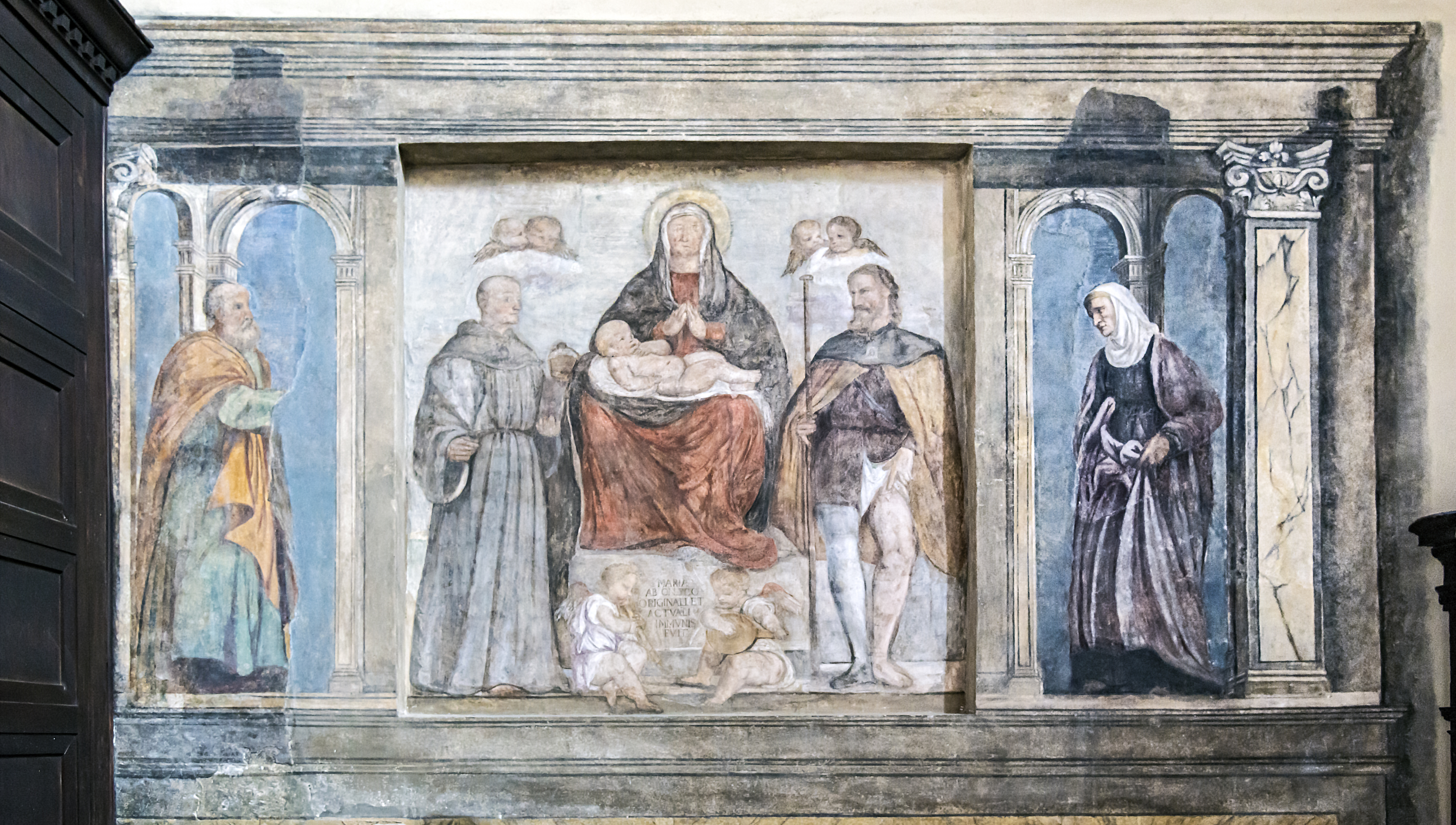
Virgin and Child Church of Santa Maria dei Servi, Padua

Girolamo Tessari (c. 1480 – c. 1561), also called Gerolamo Tessari or Girolamo dal Santo, was an Italian painter, active in a Renaissance style in his native city of Padua.

== Biography ==
Girolamo was born in Padua, probably in around 1479 to Battista and Franceschina Tessari. His father was a painter, and his grandfather Zuanne Marieta, a weaver originally from Polverara. Girolamo had three sisters, Bartolomea, Graziosa and Faustina. He married Maddalena Tassara di Giovanni da San Leonardo on 24 April 1523. They had a son named Valerio, also a painter, and three daughters. Maddalena died sometime prior to June 1546. His nickname "dal Santo" derives from the fact that he lived in a house not far from "il Santo", the Basilica of Saint Anthony of Padua.

== Career ==
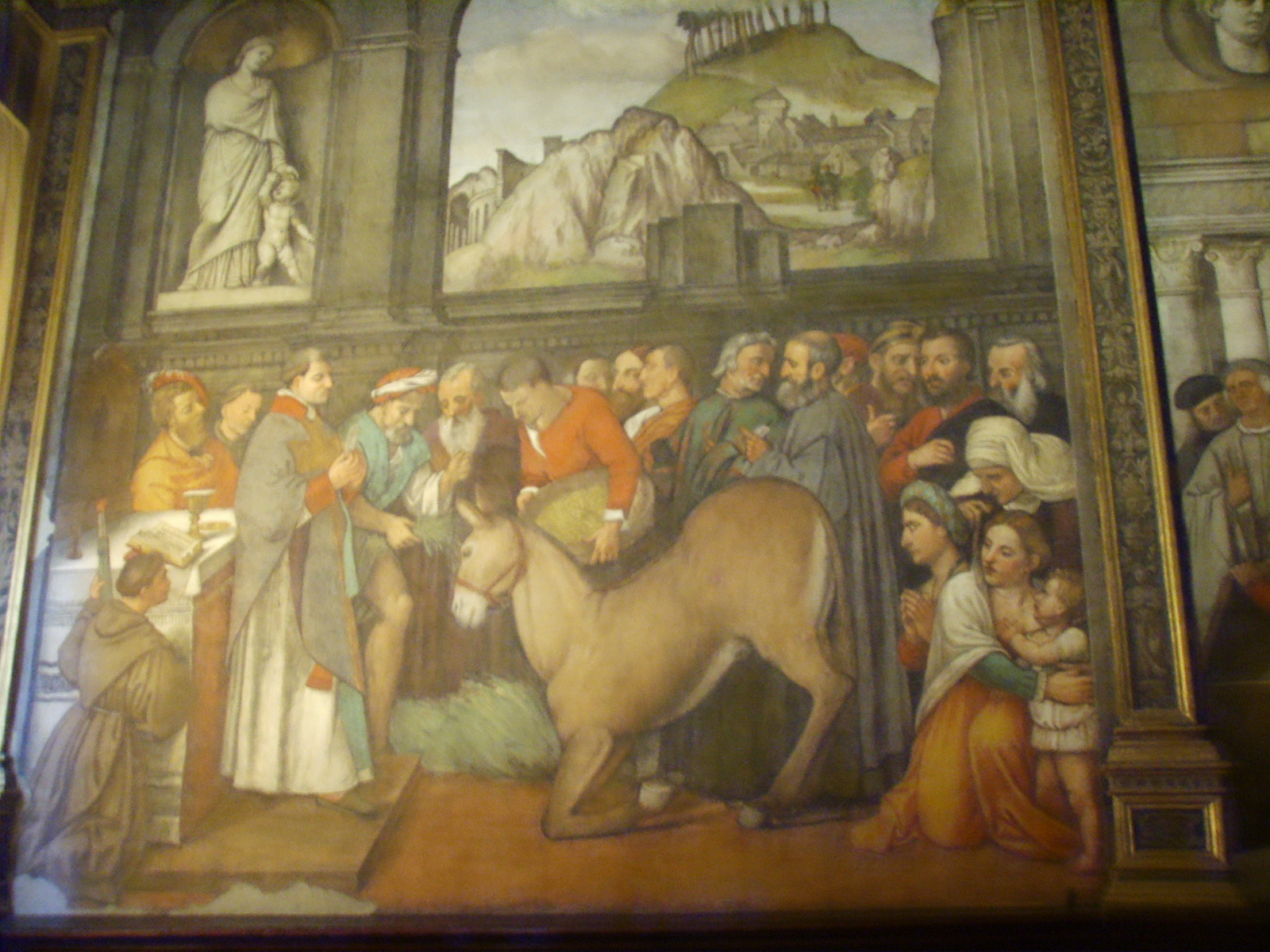
The Miracle of the Mule, 1515

While a minor figure in 16th-century Paduan painting, Tessari took part in almost all the most important decorative enterprises in Padua's churches and oratories. His first known work is the Miracle of the Glass, painted for the Scuola del Santo in Padua in 1511. In 1513 Tessari frescoed the Transit of Saint Anthony also for the Scuola del Santo; and in 1515, the Miracle of the Mule.

Between about 1535 and 1537, Tessari painted a cycle of frescoes representing Saint Anthony's miracles in the Santuario del Noce in Camposampiero, including a half lunette fresco depicting Anthony's sermon to the fish.

He was hired in 1518 to do some incidental work to complete the altarpiece of the chapel of S. "Sebastiano in the basilica that was left unfinished by Luca Antonio Busati. From 22 June 1523 to 21 August 1526 Girolamo frescoed the chapel of the Madonna in S. Francesco. In 1532, Filippo Borromeo commissioned him to create a Baptism of Christ for the church of S. Giovanni Battista in Lissaro. He also worked on the Oratory of Saint Rocco. In 1542 he completed the frescoes of the "Stories of the Life of St. Benedict" in the main cloister of S. Giustina, left unfinished by Bernardino Parentino. The fresco with the Deposition from the Cross is now in the Musei Civici di Padova. He was called to do frescoes at S. Maria di Castello in Udine.

Among his many works in Padua are a number of fresco decorations, including frescoes at the Basilica of Sant'Antonio da Padova; in the apse of the Church of Santa Maria in Vanzo (painted circa 1520); at the Scuoletta del Carmine; at the Oratory of the Confraternita del Redentore (1537); and a Deposition in the Chapter Hall of the Abbey of Praglia.

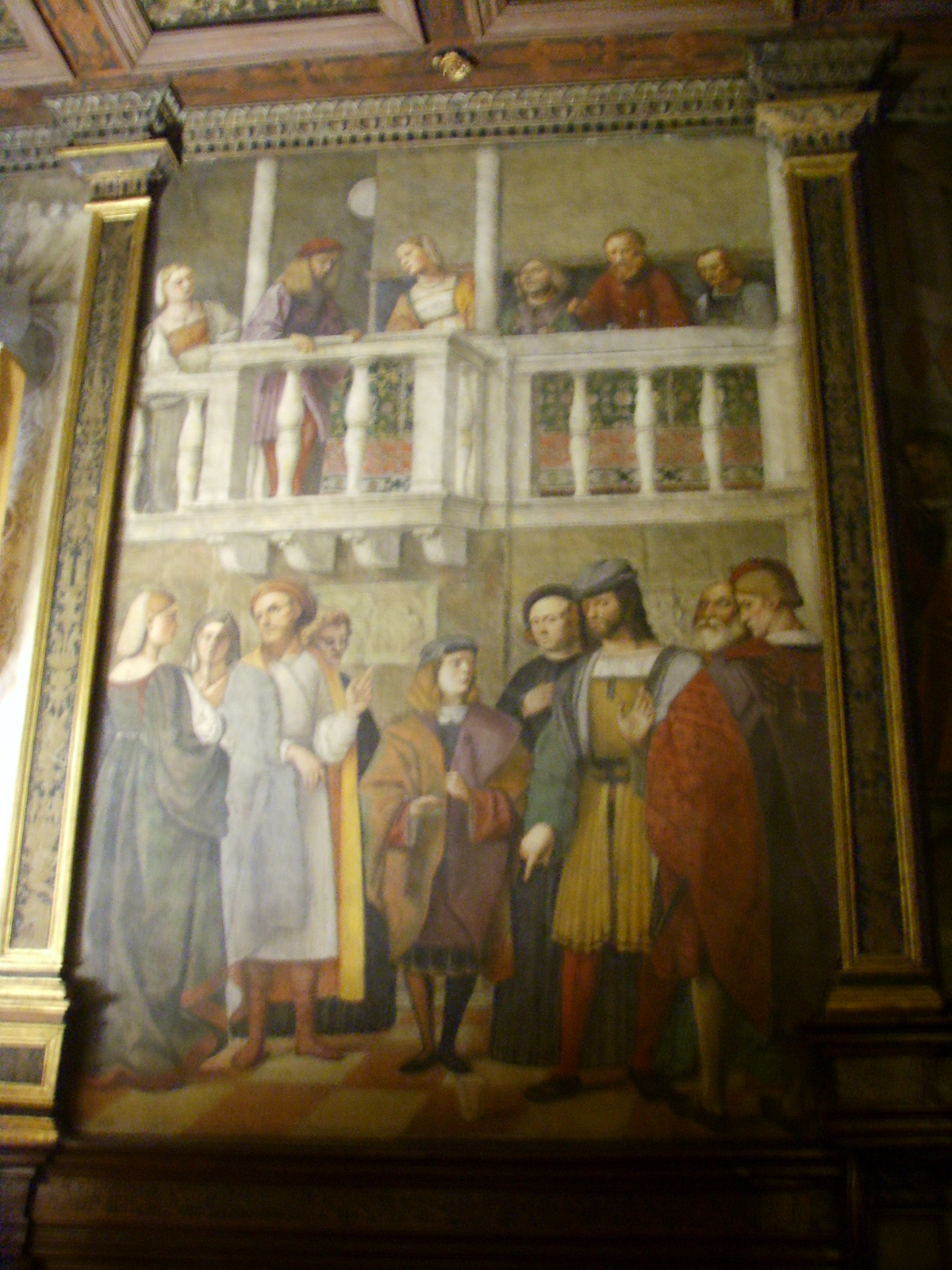
Miracle of the glass

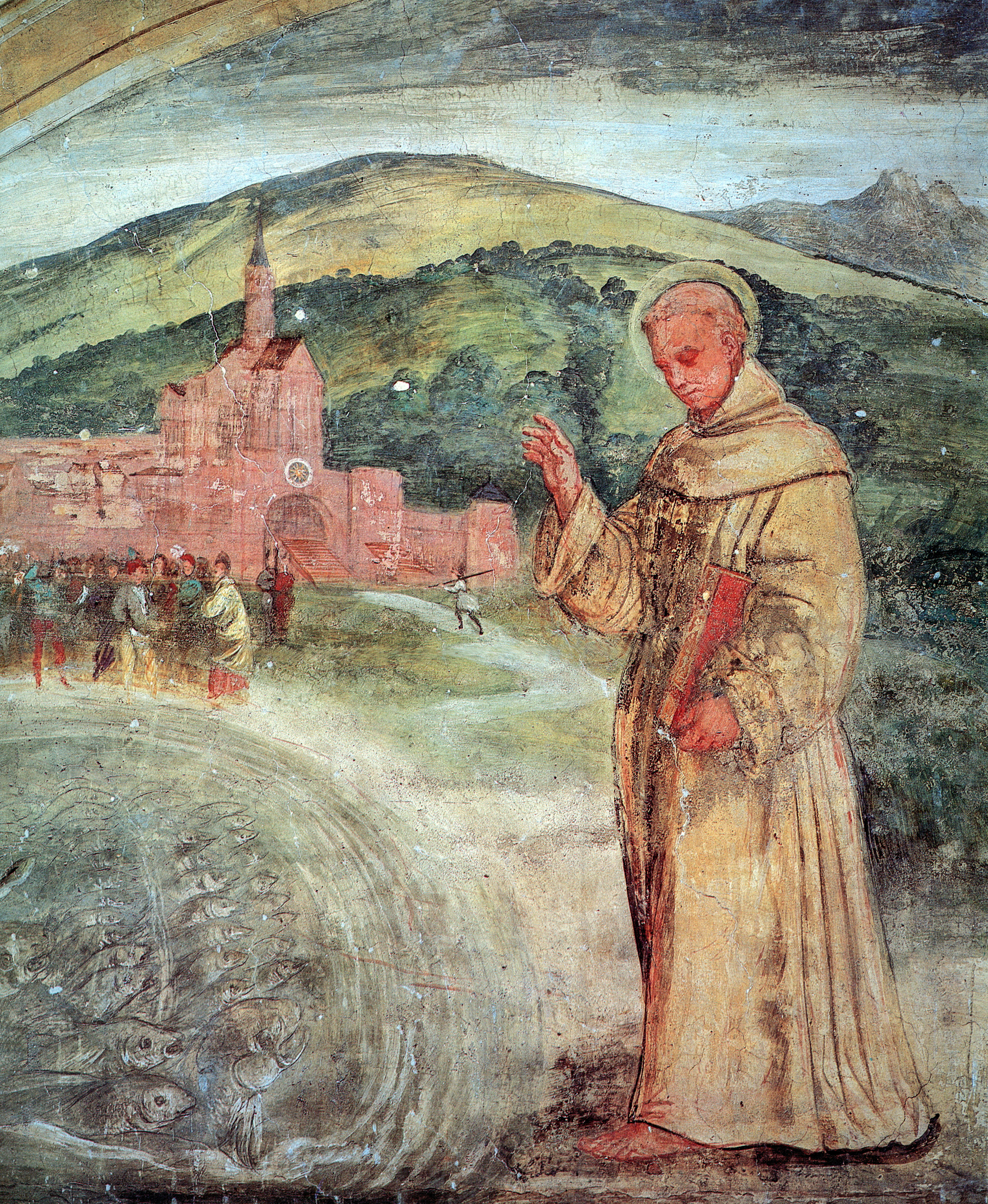
Predica ai pesci

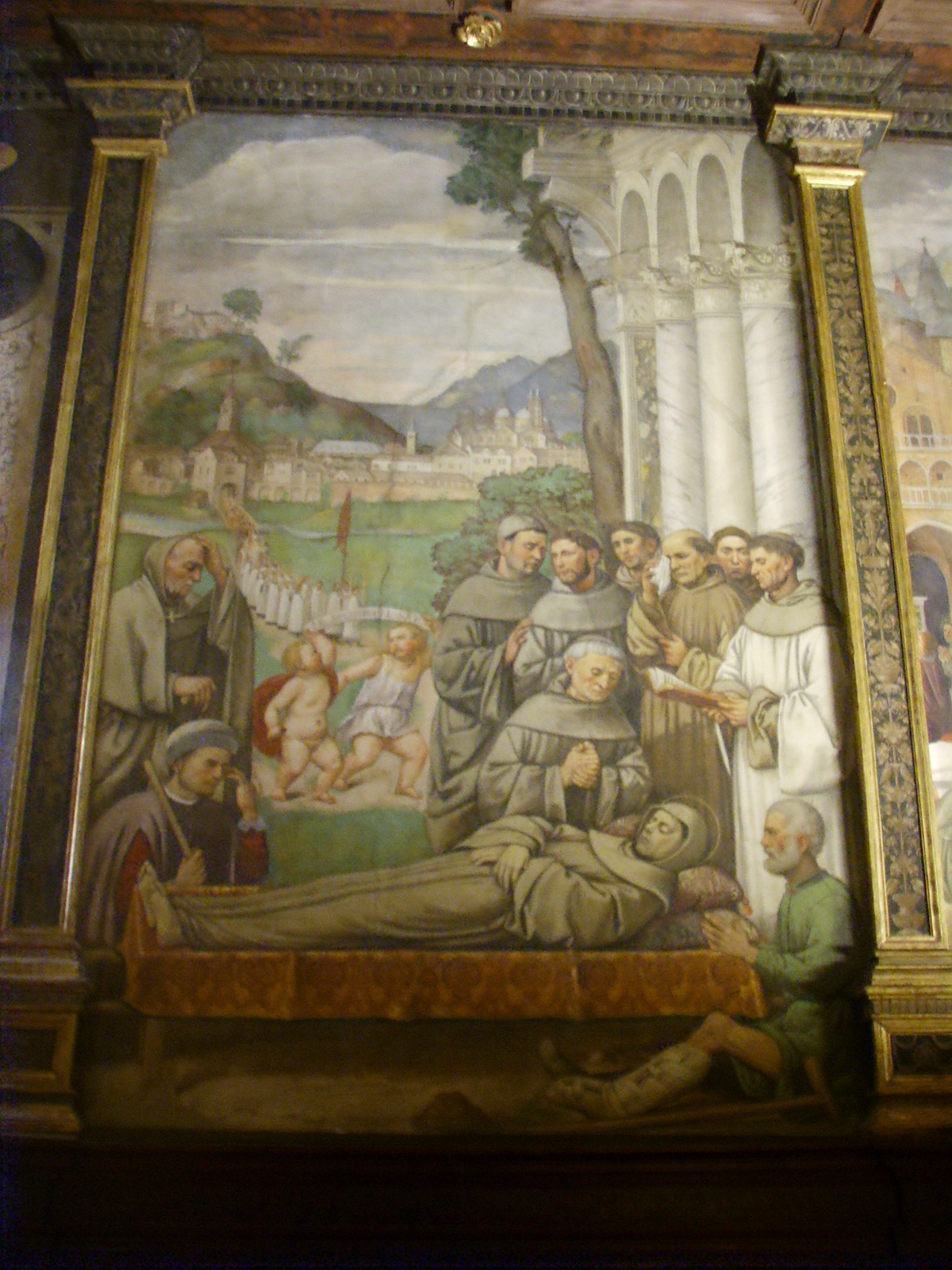
Transito di Sant'Antonio (1513)

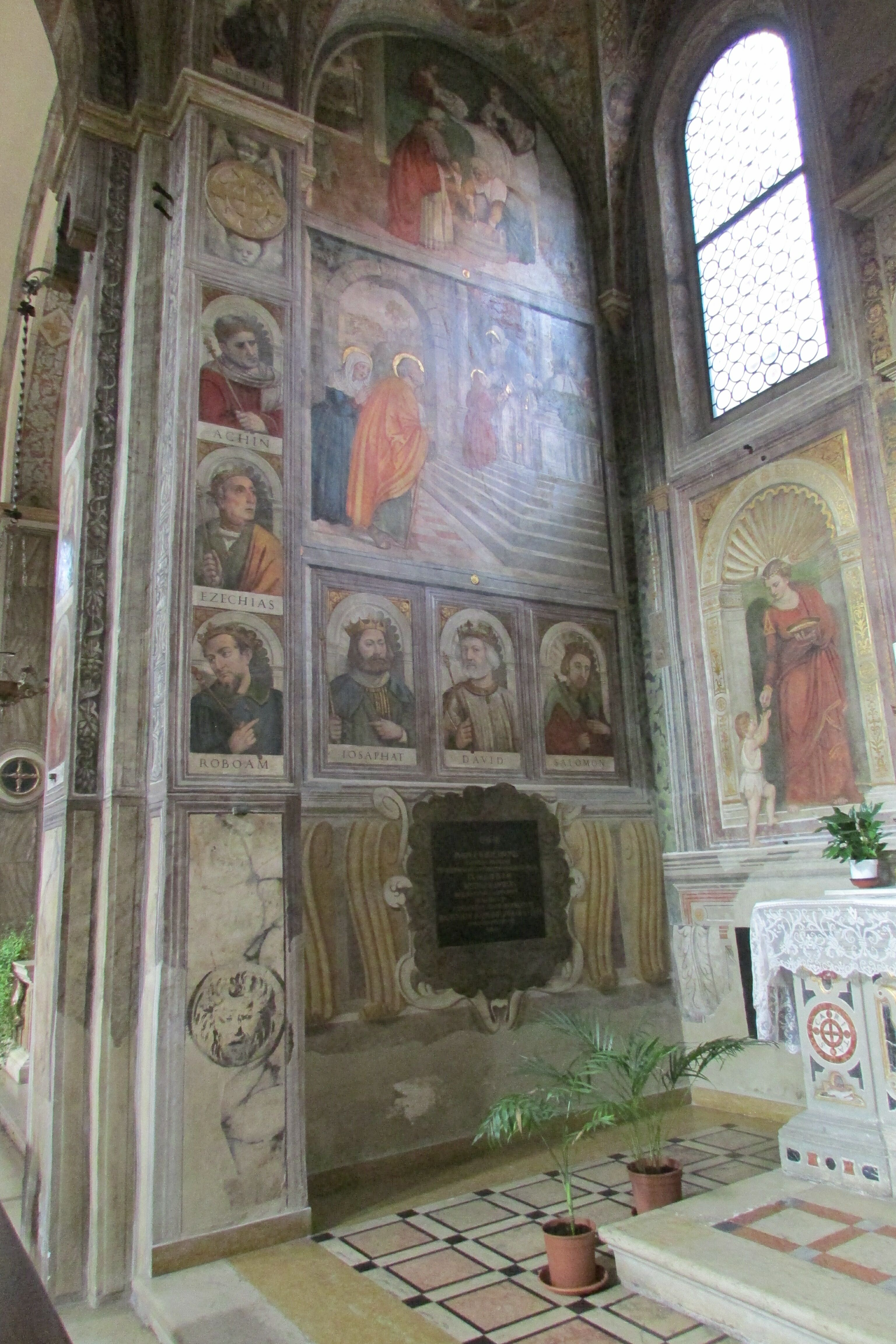
Immacolotta Chapel, S. Francesco
