= Saint John the Baptist Preaching =

Painting of John the Baptist by Paolo Veronese

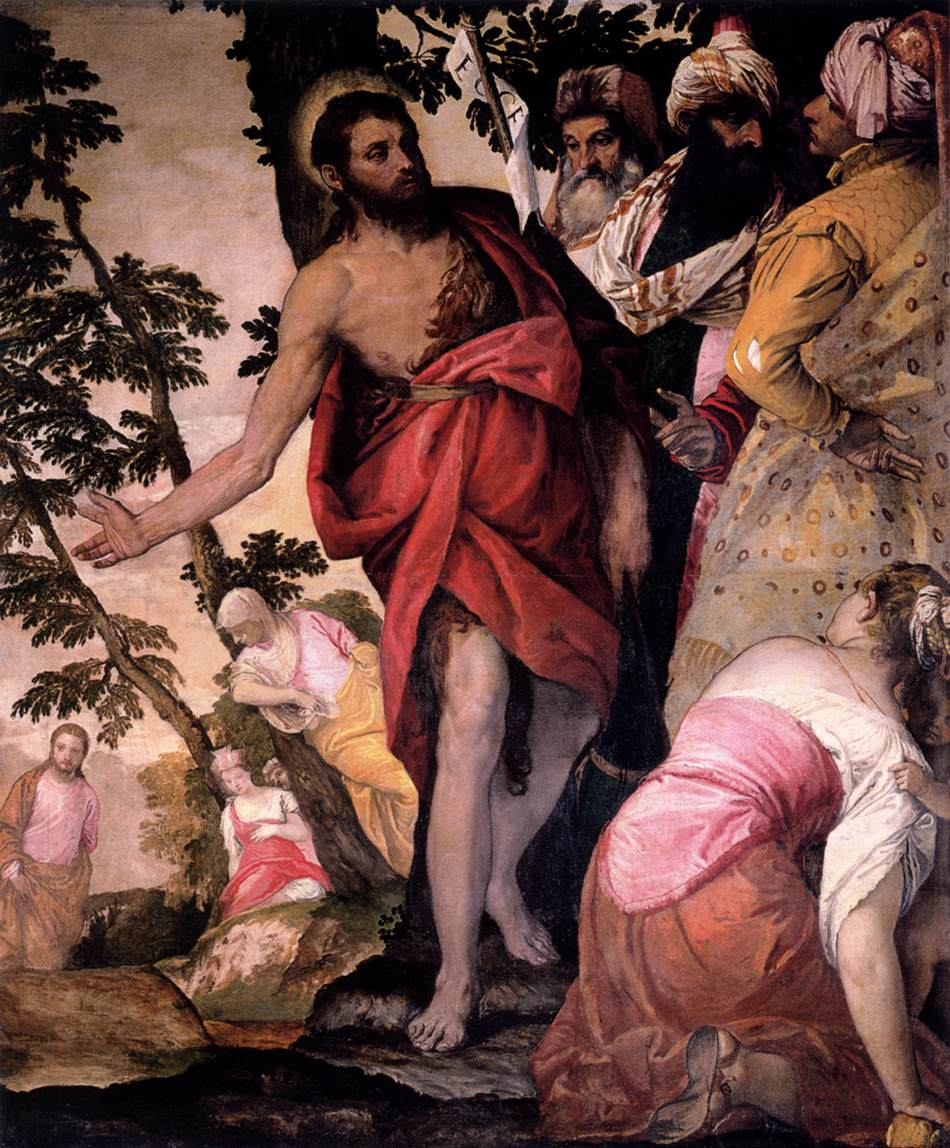
- Artist: Paolo Veronese
- Year: c. 1562
- Medium: Oil on canvas
- Dimensions: 205 cm × 169 cm (81 in × 67 in)
- Location: Galleria Borghese; Rome

Saint John the Baptist Preaching (also known as Sermon of Saint John Baptist) is a 1562 oil-on-canvas painting of John the Baptist by Paolo Veronese, now in the Galleria Borghese in Rome. The painting depicts John the Baptist acting primarily and quite literally as a messenger for the coming of Jesus.

== History and provenance ==
The painting came into the collection of Cardinal Scipione Borghese in 1607 as a gift from Francesco Barbaro (patriarch of Aquileia). An existing letter from Barbaro to Borghese documents that Barbaro sent two paintings by Veronese to Borghese separately, though the letter does not describe the paintings in much detail. The letter does note the two paintings depict "sermons"; the Galleria Borghese has owned two paintings depicting sermons—Saint John the Baptist Preaching and Saint Anthony Preaching to the Fish, both by Veronese—for quite some time. Prior to their move to the Villa Borghese Pinciana (today's Galleria Borghese), the two "sermon" paintings had been placed at Palazzo Torlonia by 1613, when they were described in verse by the court poet Scipione Francucci.

In 1897 art critic Giovanni Morelli contested the attribution of the two sermon paintings to Veronese, instead attributing them to Giovanni Battista Zelotti.

== Description ==
The painting measures 205 centimetres (81 in) high by 169 centimetres (67 in) wide. It depicts John the Baptist preaching in a forest or wilderness with spindly trees and a cloudy pinkish-yellow sky, as if at dusk or dawn. He is centered on the canvas, with his figure taking up about the central third of the canvas from top to bottom. Dressed in loose red robes and furs tied at his waist and barefoot, John holds a stick with a white banner that reads "ECCE", a Latin word and interjection meaning "behold!" or "look!" He gestures with his outstretched right arm and points to a bearded male figure who approaches from the bottom left corner of the painting and is dressed in pinkish and golden robes: Jesus. Jesus looks to his right off canvas (the painting's left) almost as if he is lost, confused, or unaware of the people nearby. Though pointing at Jesus, John looks toward three turbaned male figures who take up the rightmost third of the canvas with a blank or even haughty expression.

The three turbaned figures, sumptuously dressed, likely represent rabbis or other Jewish elites. The rightmost rabbi faces John the Baptist with his left hand on his hip and his head tilted back in an expression of contempt and disbelief. This figure's clothing is very detailed: he wears what appears to be a golden-yellow coat with slits in the elbow and a pleated collar, shoulders, and cuffs, as well as a pinkish and red turban. He also wears a diaphanous, white silk shawl or cape with golden circular motifs. The middle rabbi looks at the rightmost rabbi and sticks his left arm out between the rightmost rabbi and John the Baptist. He holds his thumb and index finger close together as if interjecting or otherwise making a point. This middle rabbi has dark black facial hair. Most of his body is visible between the two other rabbis: he wears a green, pink, and red robe, accompanied by a red and white scarf and a red, white, and yellowish turban. The leftmost rabbi has a gray beard and moustache and wears a brown and gray fur headdress, and looks down and rests his right hand on his face as if in contemplation. He is closest to Saint John the Baptist and except for his face is obscured by John's body.

In addition to the rabbis, there remain four human figures in the painting. A female figure kneeling in the bottom right corner has her back to the viewer, but looks up at John the Baptist. She wears a white, pink, and orange-red dress that does not cover her left shoulder and her hair is tied back with a knotted white cloth. Her right sandaled foot is visible. A young child holds onto her, and looks directly at the viewer over her right shoulder. Two other female figures are located in the bottom center of the painting, underneath John the Baptist's outstretched arm. The rightmost of these two female figures leans on a tree, wearing a white headscarf and pink and golden robes not unlike Jesus'. She looks back at Jesus. The leftmost female figure sits on the ground against a tree, wearing a pinkish headdress and white and red robes. She has her left hand on her chest and looks down at the ground. What appears to be a male figure rests his head on this leftmost female figure's left shoulder; only his face is visible.

== Analysis ==
In this painting John the Baptist acts primarily and quite literally as a messenger for the coming of Jesus. The rabbis' contrasting body language evinces differing reactions to John's message. Veronese's detailed and sumptuous depiction of the figures' clothing and fabrics may be seen as a reflection on the quality of Venetian textiles, a theme also present in the works of Palma Vecchio.
