= Santuario del Noce =

Catholic chapel in Camposampiero, Italy

Sanctuary of the Walnut
- Santuario del Noce
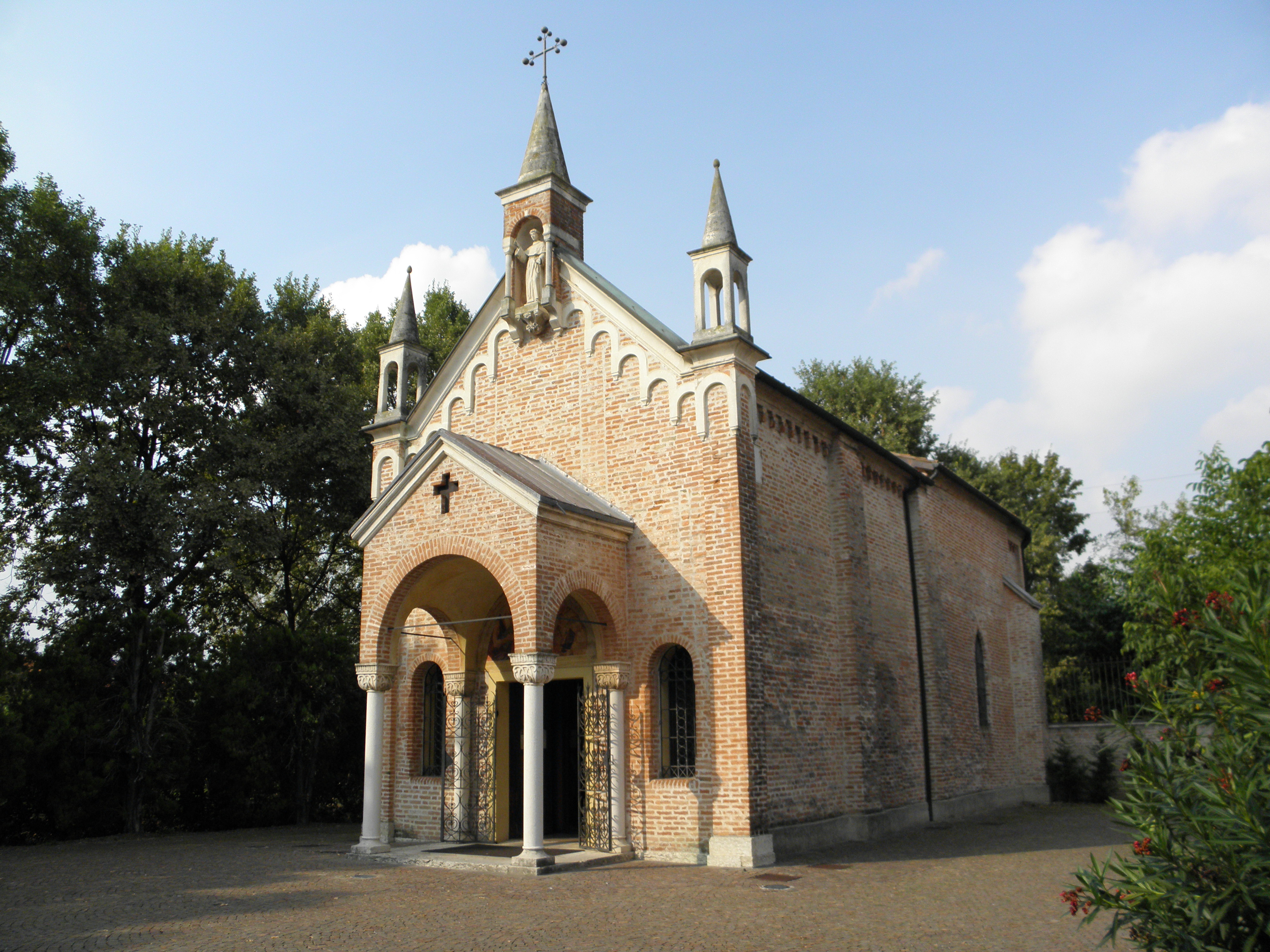
- The Santuario del Noce
- Sanctuary of the Walnut
- Location: Camposampiero, Veneto, Italy
- Denomination: Catholic Church

History
- Status: Consecrated chapel
- Dedication: Anthony of Padua

Architecture
- Completed: 1432

Administration
- Diocese: Diocese of Treviso

The Santuario del Noce (literally, "Sanctuary of the Walnut [Tree]") is a 15th-century Roman Catholic chapel or place of worship dedicated to Anthony of Padua in Camposampiero, Veneto, Italy.

== History ==
According to legend, Anthony of Padua preached to peasants and lived among walnut trees where the chapel now stands. A certain Count Gregorio Callegari and a group of friars spearheaded the original sanctuary's construction in 1432. This original 9-metre (30 ft) long by 6-metre (20 ft) wide structure still exists, corresponding to the front entrance portion of the current chapel. The structure was enlarged on at least three separate occasions during the second half of the 15th century, including a circa 1455 addition measuring 6 metres long by 6 metres wide. This 1455 addition corresponds to the chapel's existing middle portion. The existing back apse (which also serves as a sacristy) was only built in 1865, and renovated in a Neo-Gothic style by Augusto Zardo in 1901.

On 23 May 1604 Bishop of Caorle Luigi de Grigis officially consecrated the chapel. It is now under the jurisdiction of the Roman Catholic Diocese of Treviso.

== Artwork ==
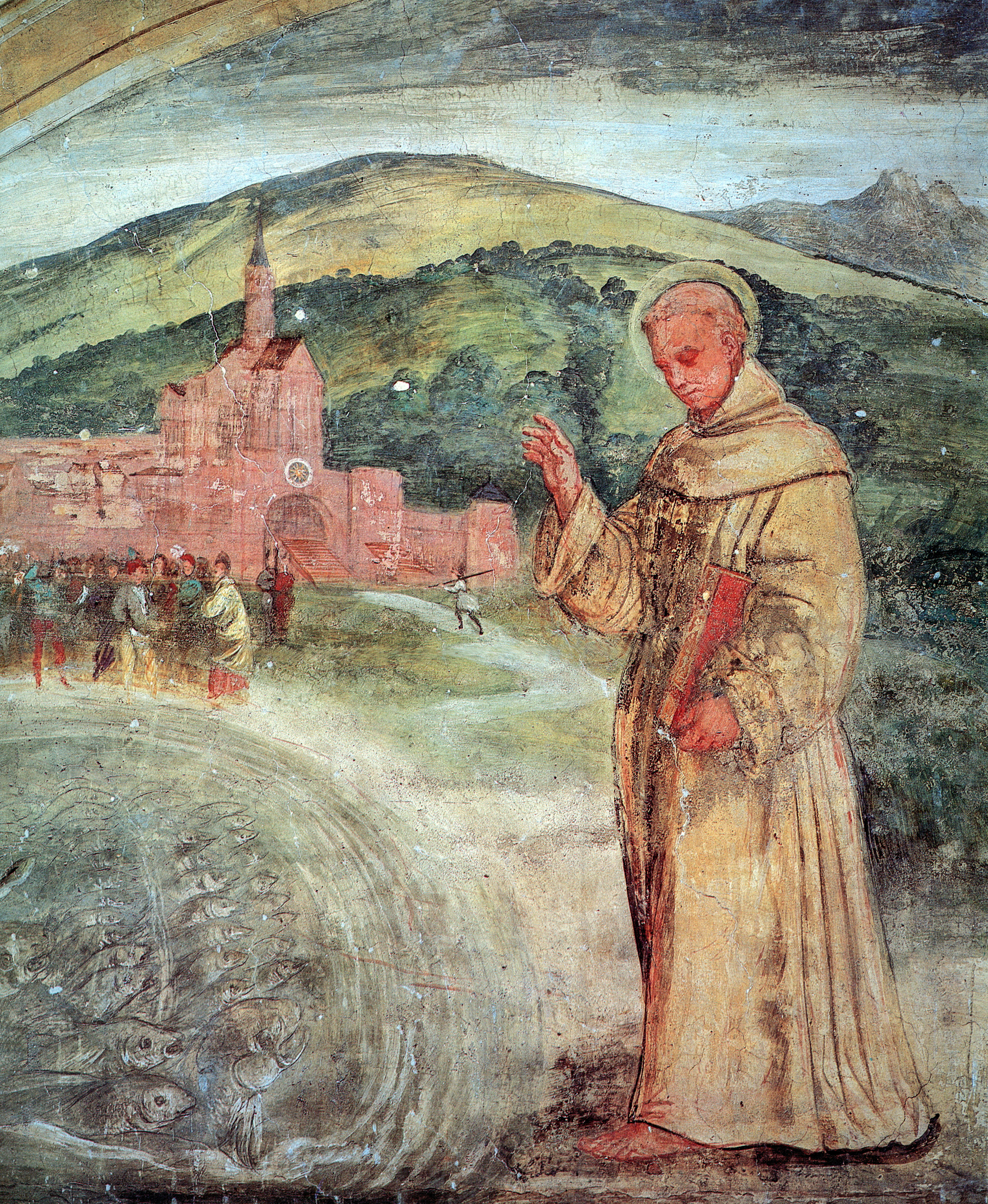
Predica ai pesci ("Preaching to the fish"), Girolamo Tesssari, c. 1535–1537, fresco (detail), Santuario del Noce, Camposampiero

A circa 1533–1536 altarpiece by Bonifacio de' Pitati now in the chapel's apse depicts Anthony preaching from the walnut tree. Between about 1535 and 1537, Girolamo Tessari painted a cycle of frescoes representing Saint Anthony's most important miracles in the chapel, including a half lunette fresco depicting Anthony's sermon to the fish.

== See also ==
- Anthony of Padua
