= Filippo da Verona =

Italian painter

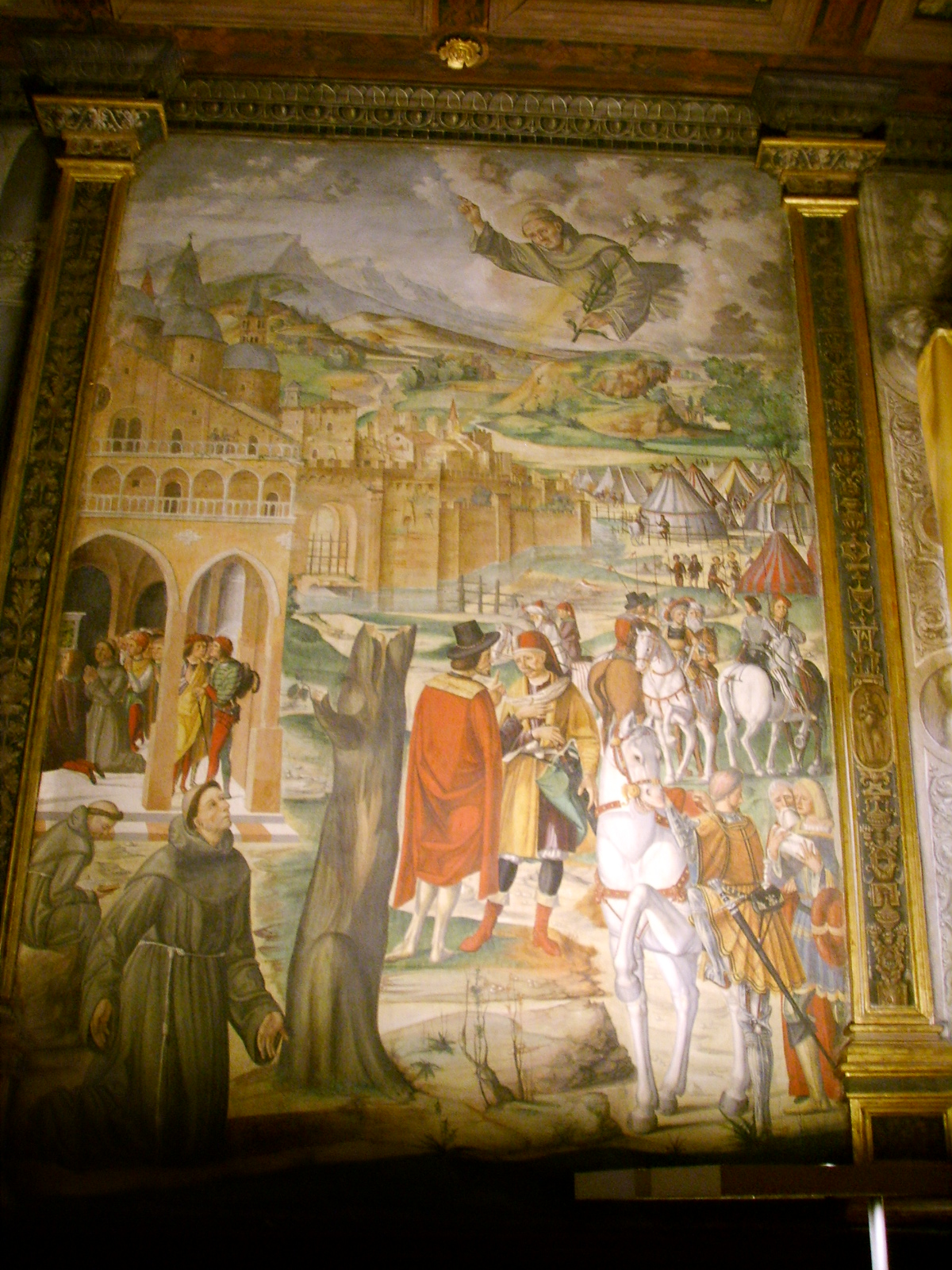
Filippo da Verona, fresco, 1510. In Basilica of Saint Anthony of Padua

Filippo da Verona (16th century) was an Italian painter of the early-Renaissance period.

He painted in a style recalling Giambattista Cima, and is the author of a Virgin and Child in the Academy of Arts in Turin, a replica of which is in the Locchis Carrara Gallery at Bergamo. He was employed at the Church of the Eremitani in Padua, where he painted the Glory of the Virgin, with Angels and Saints in 1511; having previously in 1509 produced a Virgin and Child, with SS. Felix and Catharine for the Basilica of Saint Anthony of Padua. The church of San Niccoló in Fabriano has a Madonna between SS. Peter and Nicholas of Bari dated 1514.
