= Camposampiero =

- Comune
- Comune di Camposampiero
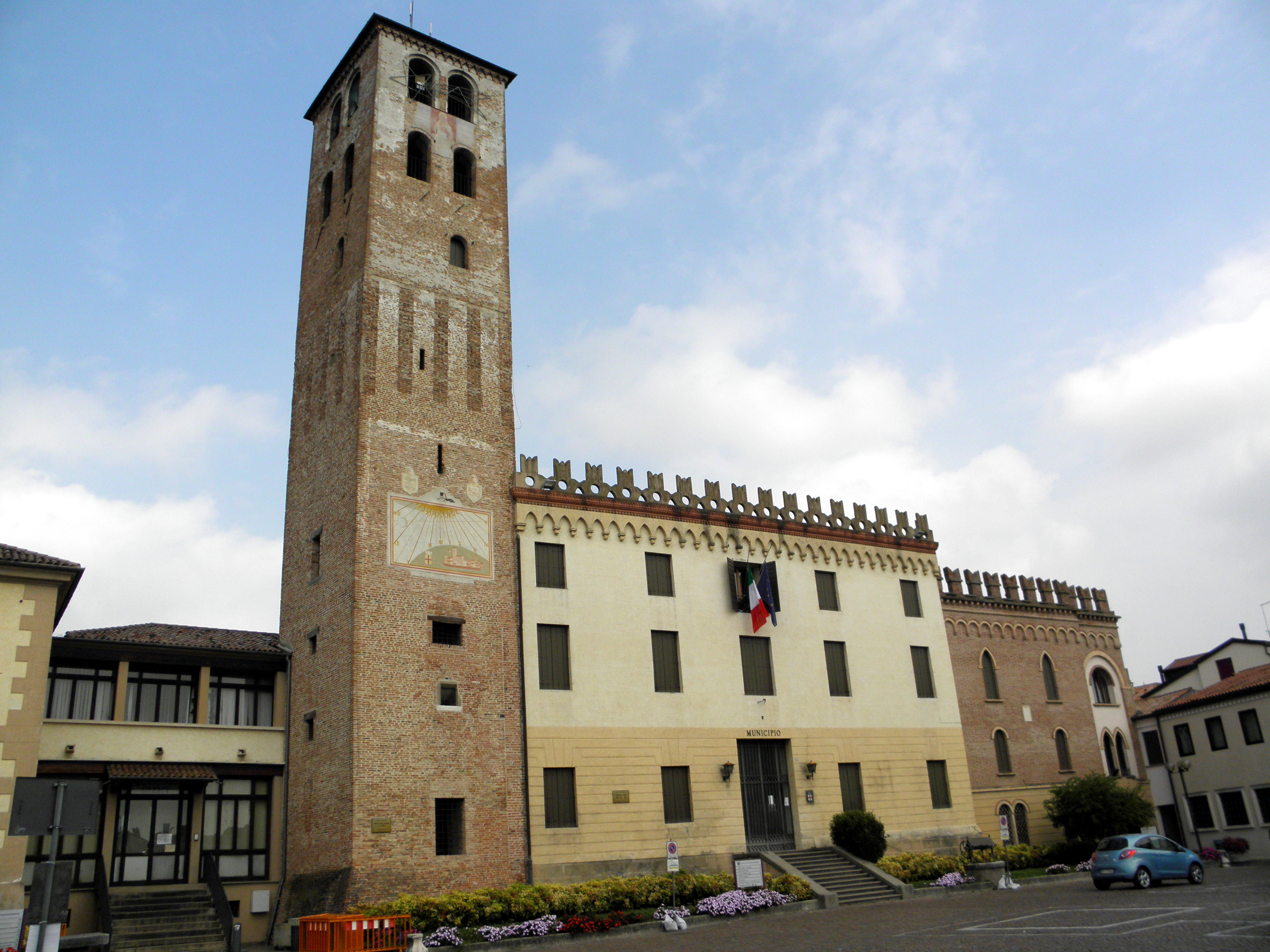
- Torre della Rocca and Tiso palace

- Coat of arms

- Location within Italy Location within Veneto
- Coordinates: 45°34′N 11°56′E
- Country: Italy
- Region: Veneto
- Province: Padua (PD)
- Frazioni: Rustega

Government
  - Mayor: Katia Maccarrone

Area
  - Total: 21.07 km^{2} (8.14 sq mi)
- Elevation: 24 m (79 ft)

Population (2007)
  - Total: 11,726
  - Density: 556.5/km^{2} (1,441/sq mi)
- Demonym: Camposampieresi
- Time zone: UTC+1 (CET)
  - Summer (DST): UTC+2 (CEST)
- Postal code: 35012
- Dialing code: 049
- Patron saint: Saint Anthony of Padua
- Website: Official website

Camposampiero is a town and comune in the province of Padua, Veneto, northern Italy. The 15th-century Santuario del Noce, a Roman Catholic chapel dedicated to Anthony of Padua, is located in Camposampiero.

== Twin towns – sister cities ==
Camposampiero is twinned with

- Jasło, Poland, since November 2002

== Notable people ==
- Maurizio Bedin, footballer
- Dino Baggio, footballer
- Fabrizio Gollin, racing driver
- Giovanni Fabbian, footballer
