= Padua's fourteenth-century fresco cycles =

UNESCO World Heritage Site
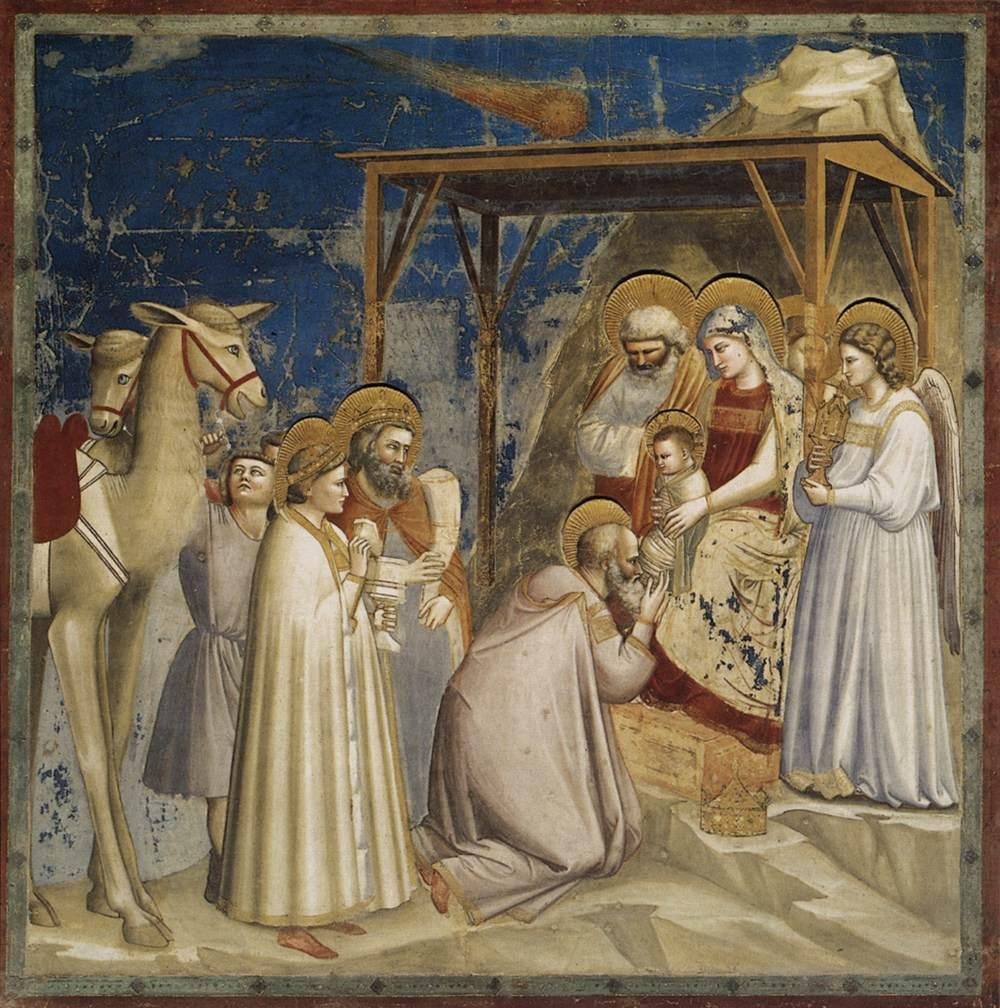
- Adoration of the Magi in the Scrovegni Chapel

- Location within Veneto Location within Italy
- Location: Padua, Veneto, Italy
- Criteria: Cultural: (ii), (iii)
- Reference: 1623
- Inscription: 2021 (44th Session)
- Coordinates: 45°24′43″N 11°52′46″E

Padua's fourteenth-century fresco cycles is a UNESCO World Heritage Site in Padua, Italy, listed in 2021.

The site comprises eight buildings, both religious and secular, in four clusters. They house fresco cycles that were painted between 1302 and 1397 by several prominent painters: Giotto, Guariento di Arpo, Giusto de' Menabuoi, Altichiero da Zevio, Jacopo d'Avanzi, and Jacopo da Verona. The frescos are innovative in their way of depicting the allegorical narrative and use new way of perspective. Emotions of characters are shown in a realistic manner. In some frescoes, the patron who commissioned them is depicted as one of the characters in a story. This new fresco style formed the inspirational basis for centuries of fresco work in the Italian Renaissance and beyond.

== List of the sites ==
The World Heritage Site comprises four clusters:

Name	Image	ID	Property Area	Description
Scrovegni Chapel, Church of the Eremitani	Interior of the chapel, covered by frescos	1623-001	7.18 hectares (17.7 acres)	
Palazzo della Ragione, Chapel of the Cararesi Palace, Cathedral Baptistery	Interior of a large hall, covered by frescos	1623-002	7.34 hectares (18.1 acres)	
Basilica and Monastery of St. Anthony, Oratory of San Giorgio	Church altar, covered by frescos	1623-003	5.19 hectares (12.8 acres)	
San Michele Oratory		1623-004	0.25 hectares (0.62 acres)	
