= Padua Cathedral =

Cathedral in Padua, Italy

Coordinates: 45°24′23″N 11°52′18″E

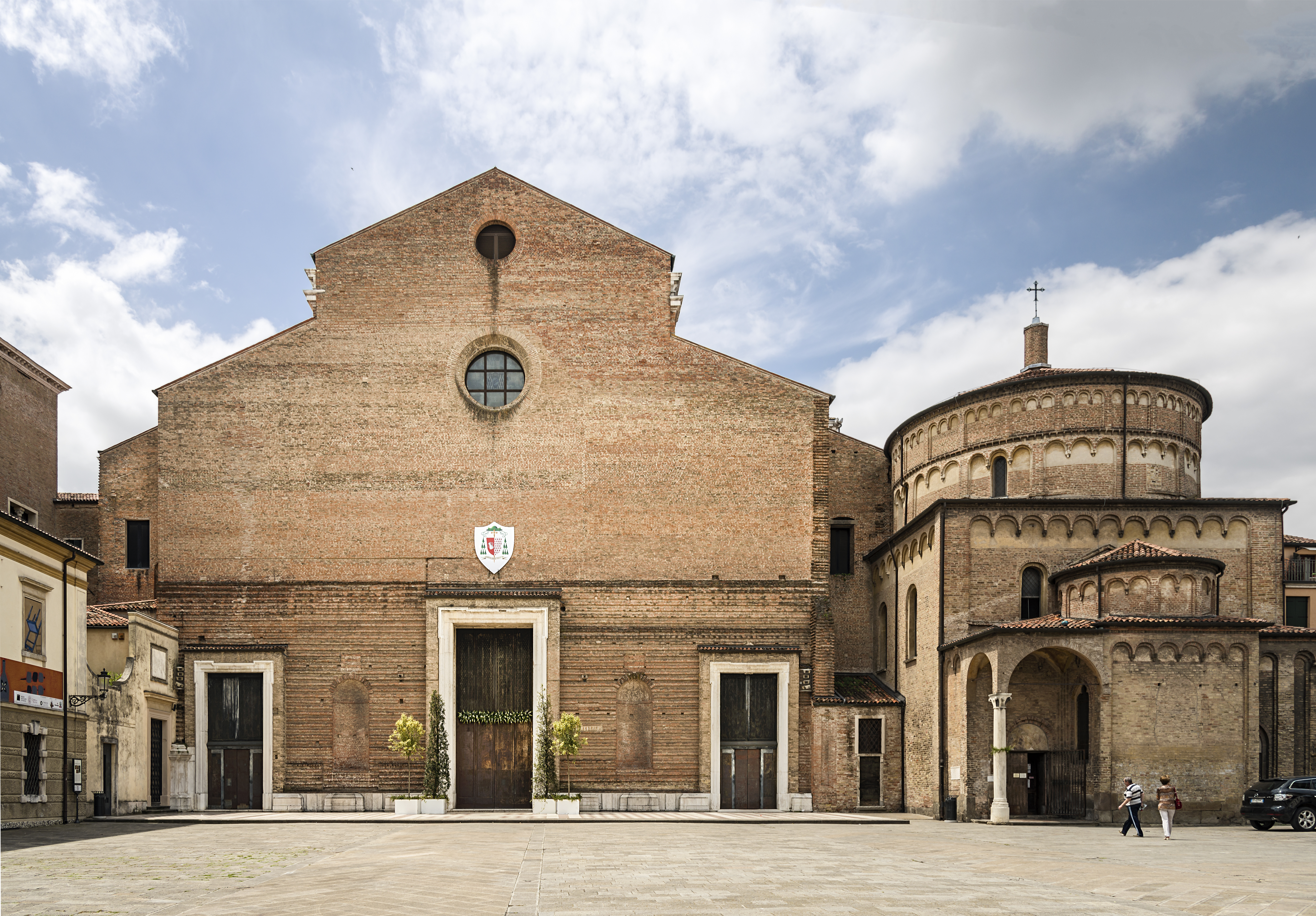
Padua Cathedral with the baptistery on the right

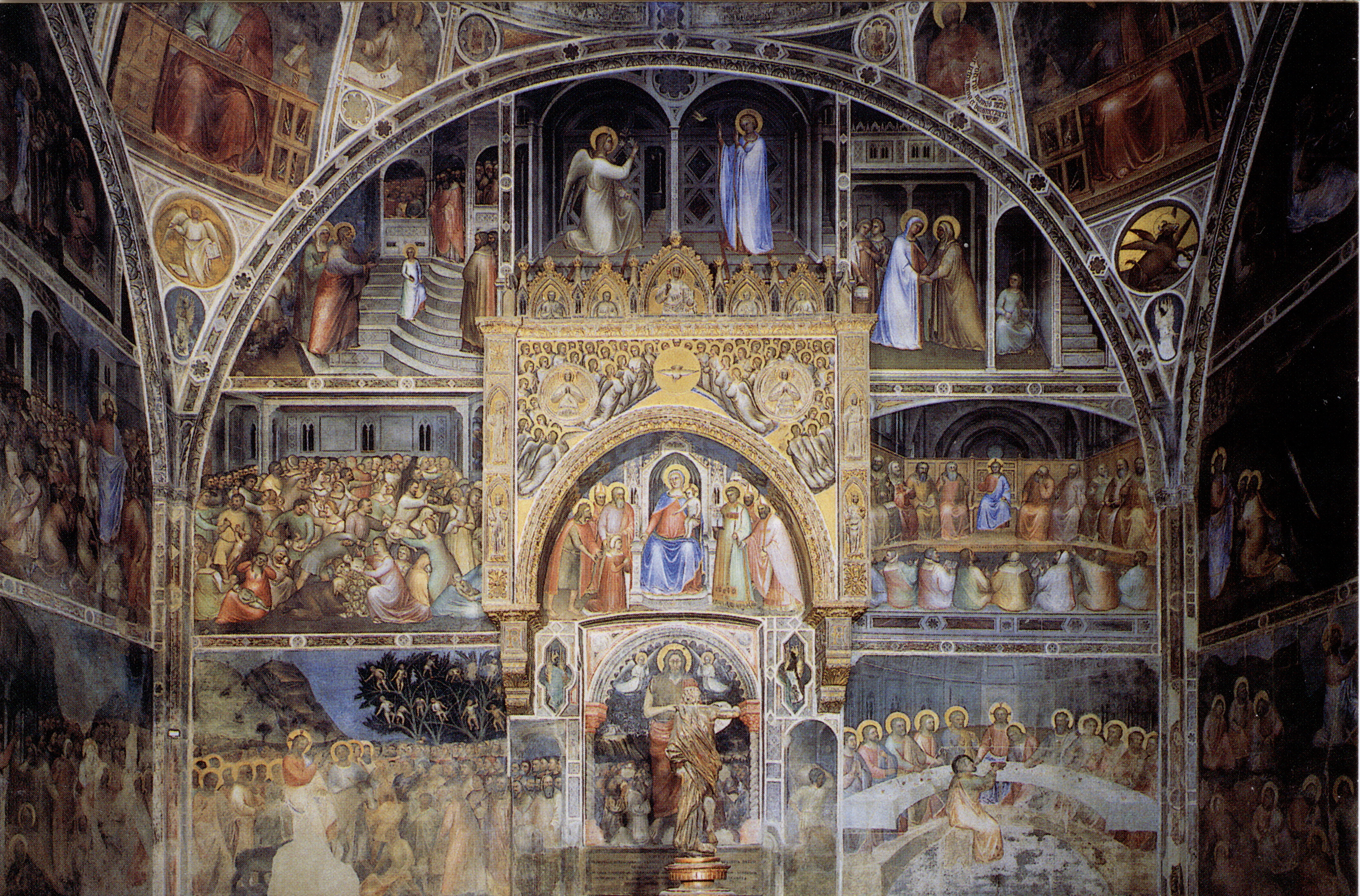
Frescoes in the baptistery by Giusto de' Menabuoi

Padua Cathedral, or Basilica Cathedral of Saint Mary of the Assumption (Italian: Duomo di Padova; Basilica Cattedrale di Santa Maria Assunta), is a Catholic church and minor basilica located on the east end of Piazza Duomo, adjacent to the bishop's palace in Padua, Veneto, Italy.

The cathedral, dedicated to the Assumption of the Virgin Mary, is the seat of the Bishop of Padua. The church building, first erected as a cathedral in the 4th century, has undergone major reconstructions over the centuries.

== History ==
The present church is the third structure built on the same site. The first cathedral was erected after the Edict of Milan in 313 and destroyed by an earthquake on 3 January 1117. It was rebuilt in Romanesque style: the appearance of that medieval church can be seen in the frescoes by Giusto de' Menabuoi in the adjoining baptistery. The current building dates from a reconstruction during the sixteenth century. While in the past the design was attributed to Michelangelo, it was performed rather by Andrea della Valle and Agostino Righetto, and has much in common with earlier Paduan churches. Construction began on the new Renaissance building in 1551 and went on for two centuries, being completed in 1754, yet leaving the façade unfinished.

The Cathedral Basilica of Santa Maria Assunta is dedicated to the Assumption of Mary, and has the dignity of minor basilica. It is also a parish center and allows for veneration of the bodies of San Daniele, San Leonino and San Gregorio Barbarigo.

=== Paleochristian Age ===
Tradition says that the first cathedral, dedicated to Santa Giustina, was built after the Edict of Constantine. A pillar of stone surmounted by a cross marks its location in the current churchyard. During a restoration (ca 462 or 602) the Episcopal see of Patavium was joined to that of Santa Maria. Bishop Tricidio restored the cathedral in 620 and it was again rebuilt between 899 and 900 due to a fire. In 1075 the Bishop Olderico consecrated the new cathedral on the ruins of the previous church. For this last step construction, later historians suppose that the facade was located to the east, with a confession and a crypt under the apse where bishop Tricidio is buried. His tombstone was discovered during the excavation of the foundations. This basilica collapsed during the 3 January 1117 earthquake.

Excavation and research by the Chair of Medieval Archeology at the University of Padua between 2011 and 2012 has expanded knowledge of the entire area around the Episcopal Palace, the cathedral, and the Baptistery. In the north-east corner of the churchyard, they found the base of a tower with a square plan (10x10 metres; 33x33 ft.) Romanesque style from between the 10th and 12th century. The excavations found the foundations of buildings from between the ninth and eleventh century. North of the baptistery are a series of mosaic pavements from the fourth and the fifth centuries. Among the finds are: a sarcophagus in stone for relics, a Lacerta altar dating from the fifth or sixth century, fragments of liturgical furnishings from various eras, graves (56 individuals), and traces of home workshops from the Longobard age.

=== The cathedral of Macillo ===
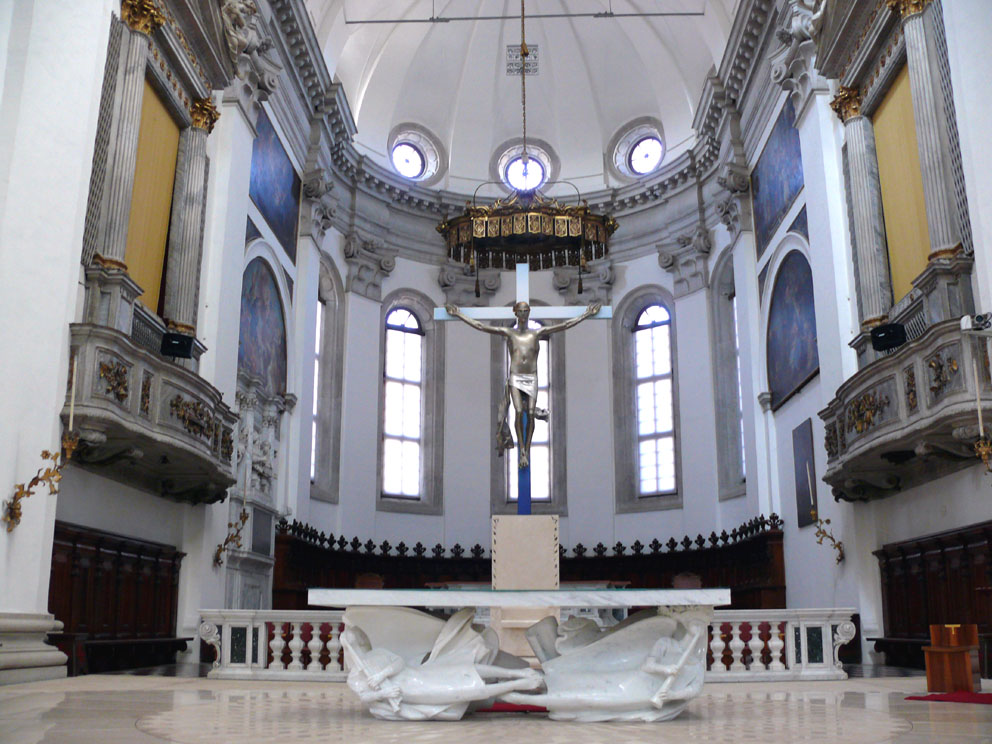
Presbytery of Padua Cathedral

As a result of the earthquake of 1117, a new cathedral was erected by architect Macillo, it is not clear whether on the ruins of the cathedral of Olderico or to a new location; it opens onto a piazza and churchyard. It was consecrated the 24 April 1180. The new church stood in area of the current cathedral, with the identical orientation (facade to the east and presbytery to the west) divided into three naves and the transept. The side aisle to the south overlooked a road that skirted the Episcopal Palace and the bell tower; the side aisle to the north was contiguous to the cloister of the canons and the baptistery. Inside the nave the aisles were divided by columns and pillars, alternative in the Ottonian tradition. In 1227 the campanile was rebuilt. Bishop Stephen from Carrara promoted some restoration and embellishment of the vaults (1399 and 1400).

=== The new cathedral ===
Bishop Peter Barozzi wanted to modernize the church with the construction of a new, great presbytery. The first stone was blessed and placed in the foundation 6 May 1522 by Cardinal Francis Pisani, who with the Canons and the prebendati funded the reconstruction. The project continued over two centuries. On 2 January 1551 the chapter of canons approved the model for the presbytery by Michelangelo Buonarroti to replace that of Jacopo Sansovino. The design of Michelangelo was completed within the next few decades. The presbytery was inaugurated by Bishop Federico Cornaro on 14 April 1582. Cornaro had to remove the old medieval bell tower initiated by Cardinal Pisani. The old facade was extended and adorned. Toward 1635 the construction of the right arm of the transept was begun and in 1693 the left side. The remains of the old cathedral were gradually removed and the new nave, designed by Girolamo Frigimelica Roberti and Francesco Maria Preti, as well as Giambattista Novello, built on the same site. The cathedral was consecrated on 25 August 1754 by Cardinal Carlo Rezzonico. It was then designated a minor basilica. Construction of the dome began in 1756 under the direction of John Glory and Giorgio Massari.

== Exterior ==
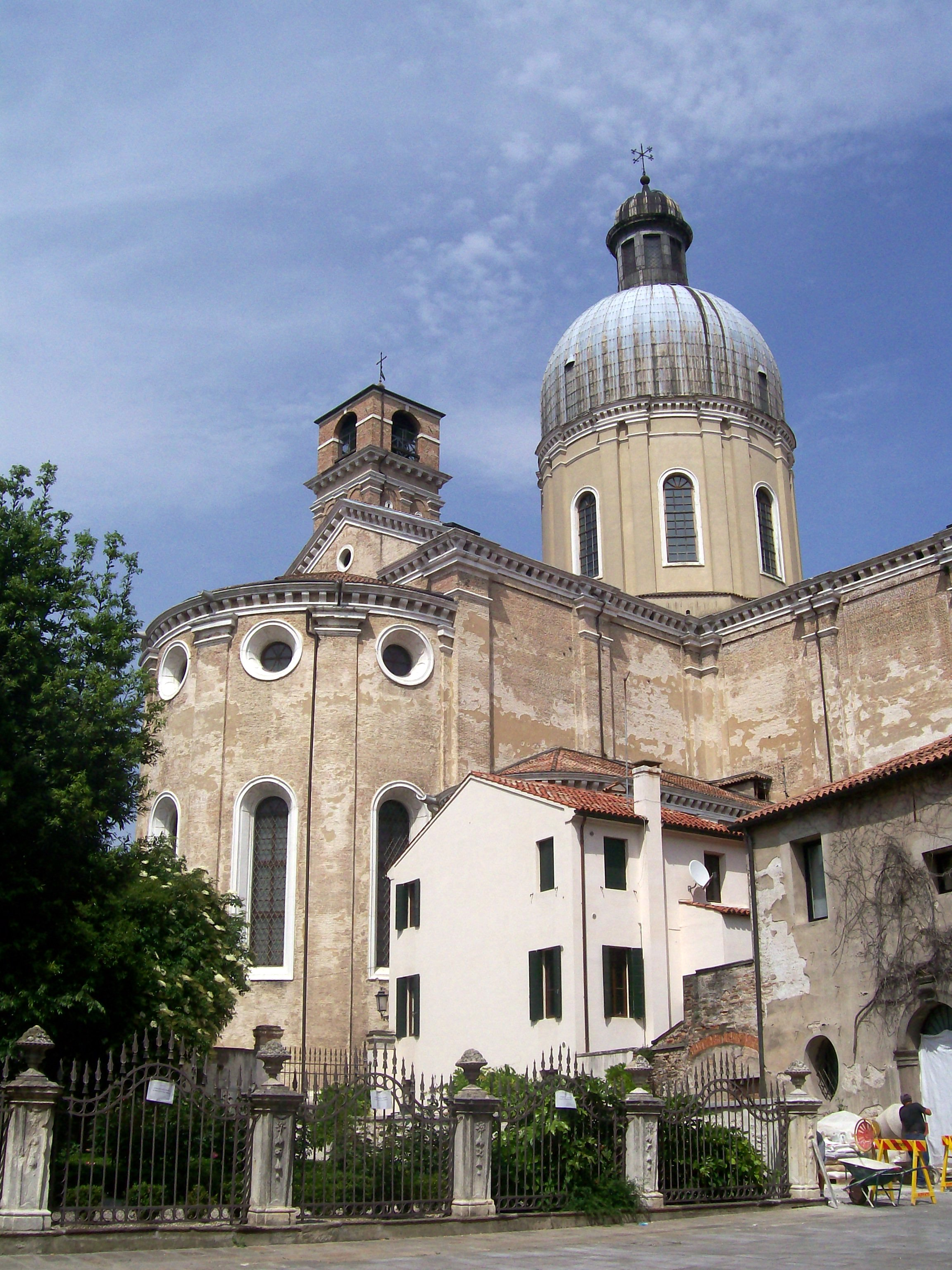
Apse, dome and bell tower of the Cathedral of Padua

The Basilica of Santa Maria Assunta stands between the episcopal palace and the Baptistery. It is a Latin cross with three bays and an octagonal dome. The dome of the Glory is covered in lead. Two sacristies adjoin the presbytery, one for the Canons and the other for the Prebendati. Between the Prebendati sacristy and the transept is the bell tower. The side doors open onto a small courtyard for the presbytery and onto the Via Duomo, by the carriage entrance to the Episcopal palace. On the bell tower is a plaque from the Roman era that mentions the Gens Fabia of Veio, a title in the history of Padua from 49 B.C.

The facade onto which open the three portals is incomplete. According to the plans of Gerolamo Frigimelica and Preti, it would have had to open to an airy atrium of access and onto the upper floor. In the facade is a great, classic pediment supported by six mighty semi-columns of the Corinthian order. A second construction to connect atrium, the loggia, and the episcopal palace would have opened to a covered ramp on the right, but was left unfinished. During the First World War a bomb hit the upper part of the facade. A small rose opening was created during the restoration.

== Interior ==
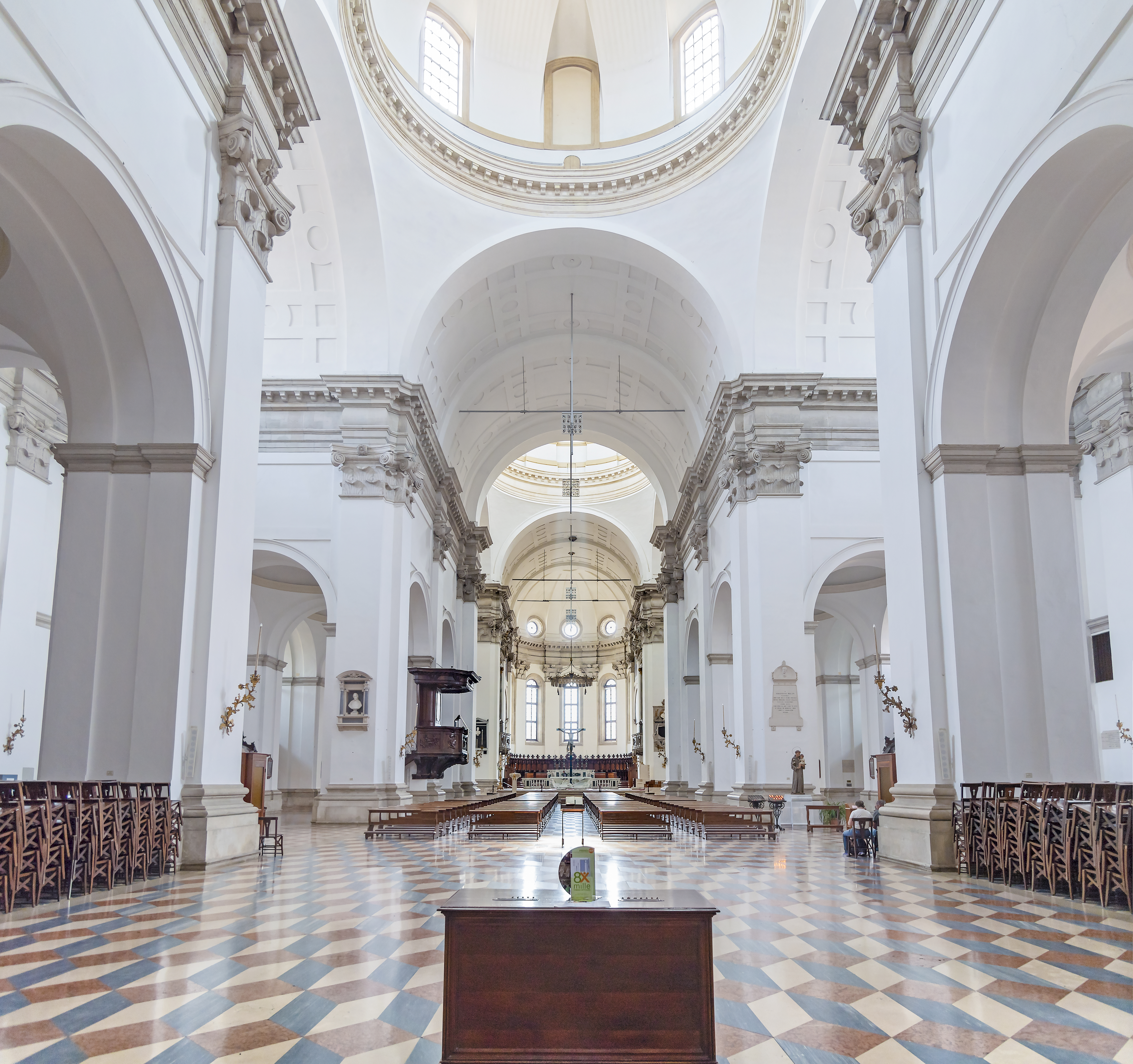
General view of the inside of the Cathedral of Padua

The nave is flanked by an aisle on each side, harmoniously matched with the nave. The central nave has two large elliptical domes, matched to the chapels of St. Gregory Barbarigo and San Lorenzo Giustiniani. A large circular dome rises over the crossing. Chapels line the side aisles. Under the presbytery, the crypt is the Chapel of Santa Cross.

=== Right aisle and chapels ===
The first chapel on the right has an altar donated in 1760 by the Fraglia (guild) of the shoemakers, and an altarpiece by Dionisio Gardini depicting Pius X as a seminarian in Padua. Originally it had a canvas by Giovanni Battista Mengardi depicting the Martyrdom of Saints Crispin and Crispiniano, patron of shoemakers. In the second chapel, the altarpiece depicts the Martyrdom of San Lorenzo by Alessandro Galvano. The chapel of San Lorenzo Giustiniani has an altarpiece commissioned by Bishop Nicholas Antonio Giustiniani to honor his ancestor. The bishop is buried in the chapel. The white marble statue (1788) was sculpted by Felice Chiereghin. The altarpiece depicting the Virgin and saints is attributed to Alessandro Varotari "the Padovanino". The walls' epigraphs and the remains of episcopalian funerary monuments belonged to the Macilliana cathedral. From 1809, behind the altar, hidden by a marble slab, is the body of San Leolino bishop of Padua, previously venerated in the church of San Leolino in Prà della Valle. At the next altar is a modern representation of the Sacred Heart (R. Mulata), replacing San Carlo Borromeo in prayer by Giovanni Battista Bissoni which was removed to the Basilica of Saint Anthony of Padua. In porch of the gate to the rectory are two monuments by Girolamo Campagna, the one on the left of Sperone Speroni and the one on the right of the daughter Giulia Speroni.

== Baptistery of the cathedral ==
The Baptistery of Padua, located to the right of the cathedral, dates from the twelfth century. It was revised the following century. and consecrated by Guido, Patriarch of Grado in 1281. There is also the mausoleum of the Carraresi. The frescoes which decorate it (1375–76) are by Giusto de Menabuoi.

== Capitulary Library ==
Holdings of the Capitular Library are kept on the premises above the sacristy of the Canons.

== See also ==
- High medieval domes
- 18th-century Western domes

== Sources ==
- Pádua: História, Arte e Cultura. Medoacvs, 1999, pp. 64–67 (in Italian)
- de' Menabuoi, Giusto, 1994: Padua Baptistery of the Cathedral : Frescoes (XIVc.) (2nd edn). Editions G Deganello. ASIN B001GB9OPO
