= Giovanni Nicolò Miretto =

Italian painter

Giovanni Nicolò Miretto (active 1423 to circa 1440) was an Italian painter active in Padua, region of the Veneto.

== Biography ==
Little is known of his biography. He frescoed the inside of the Palazzo della Ragione, Padua. The building had originally been frescoed in 1306–1309 by Giotto and followers, but these works were lost during a fire that broke out on 2 February 1420.

The building was reconstructed and frescoed by Nicolò Miretto and assistants. They completed more than 244 scenes depicting the professions of the times, and astrological influences. Circa 1430, Stefano da Ferrara joined the effort, painting 74 more scenes by 1440.
