= Piazza Duomo, Padua =

Coordinates: 45.40671°N 11.87220°E

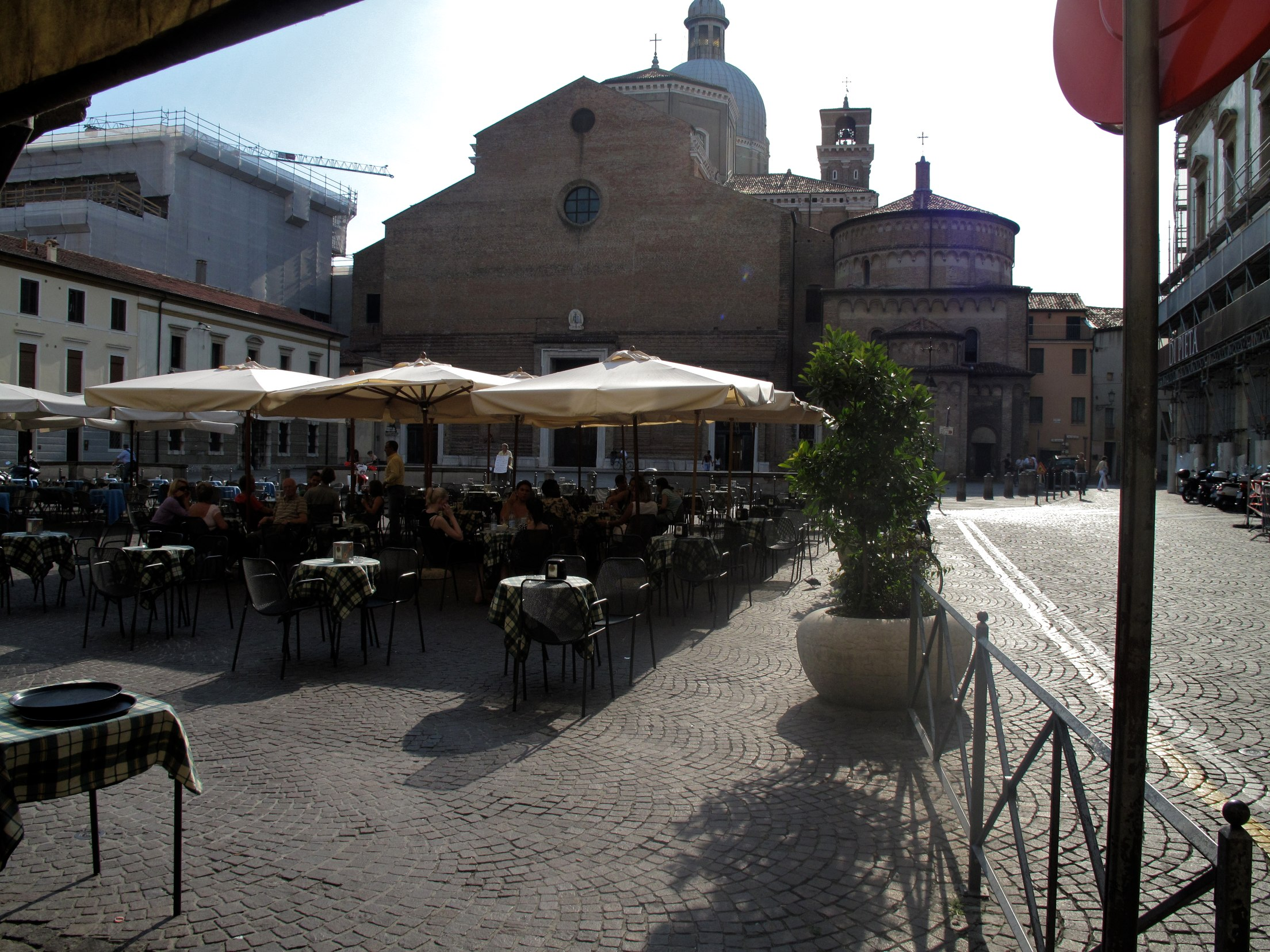
Piazza Duomo, Padua.

Piazza Duomo is a city square in Padua, Italy. It is located near Piazza dei Signori, Padua and contains the city’s cathedral.

== Baptistery ==
The Duomo of Padua and the Padua Bapistery sit next to each other at the west end of Piazza Duomo. It was built in the 12th century, and was reconstructed sometime in the 1310s and 1320s. It contains frescoes by Giusto de’ Menabuoi, which were painted in 1375 and 1376. Photography is forbidden inside.

== Buildings around the square ==
- Padua Cathedral
- Diocesan museum of Padua, Italy
- it:Battistero di Padova
- it:Museo diocesano di Padova
- it:Palazzo del Monte di Pietà Nuovo
