= San Michele Oratory =

Building in Padua, Italy

Coordinates: 45°24′05″N 11°52′09″E

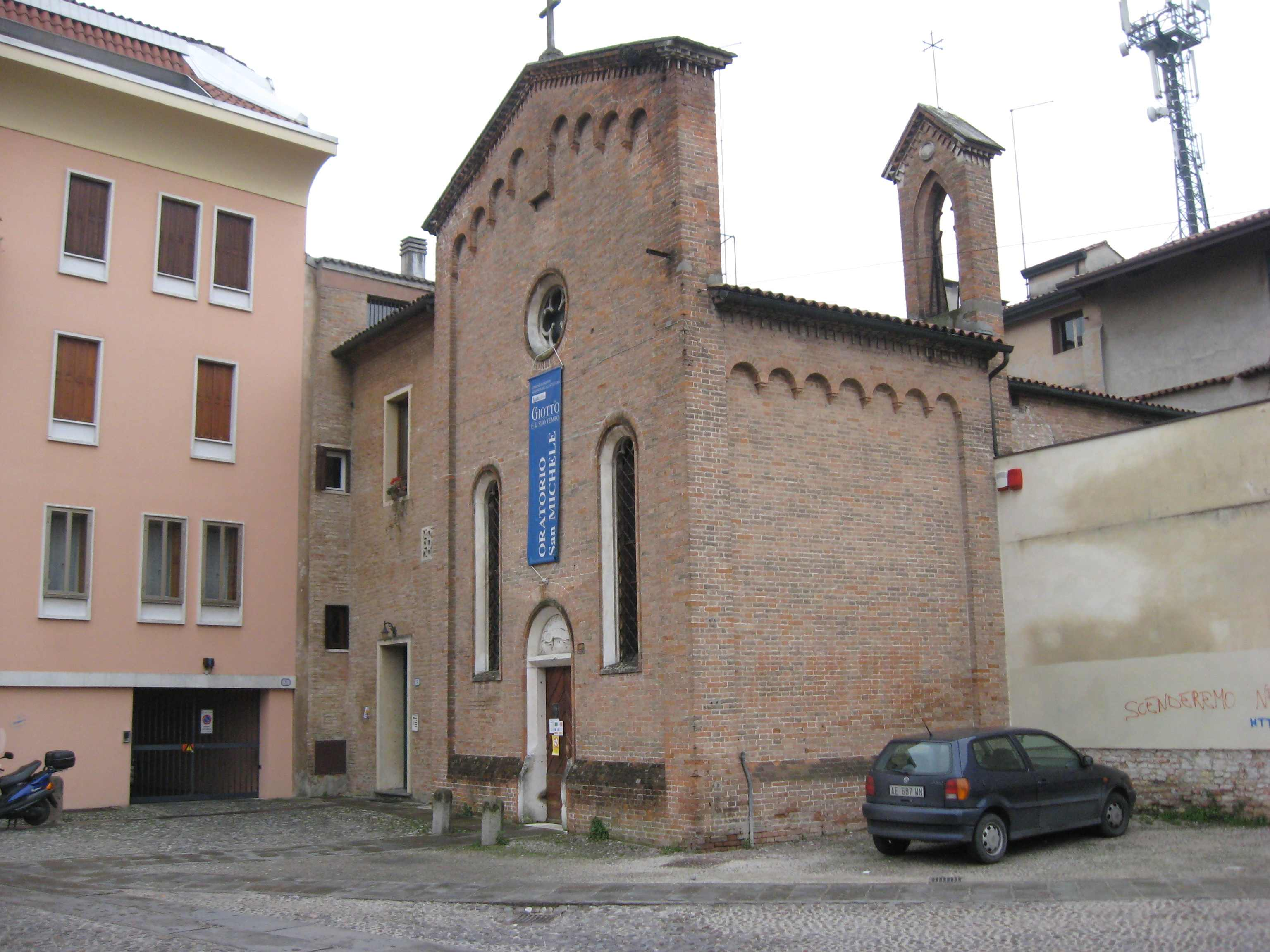
Exterior

The San Michele Oratory or Oratory of San Michele (Italian: Oratorio di San Michele) is an oratory chapel in Padova, Italy. The interior is painted with a cycle of frescoes on the life of the Virgin Mary by Jacopo da Verona. It is part of the UNESCO World Heritage Site Padua's fourteenth-century fresco cycles, inscribed in 2021.

== History ==
=== Origins ===
It first arose near the Torlonga del Castello Carrarese, outside the ancient Roman walls of the city. It was built in 1397 over the ruins of the Santi Arcangeli church, which had been renamed San Michele by the Lombards, who proclaimed Michael the Archangel "patron of Italy" after their victory over the Byzantine Empire The earlier church had been damaged in 1390 by a fire triggered by clashes between the Carraresi and Visconti during Francesco Novello da Carrara's siege of the city. After the city's fall, the Bovi family decided to build a chapel dedicated to the Virgin Mary, opening a gap in the north side of the old church's nave. An inscription on the interior wall beside the chapel entrance gives the date of construction as 1397, the commissioner of the building as Pietro di Bartolomeo de Bovi and the painter's name Jacopo da Verona:

M̊ III LXXXXVII IN̄ITOĒ V D MĒSE SEPTEB̄RIS / HANC FIERI JUSSIT PETRUS OLIM BARTHOLOMEI / DE BOBIS GENITUS PADUANA PROPAGO CAPELLĀ / HVIC TIBI DEVOTO MISERERE PUERPERA VIRGO / AD CUIUS LAUDEM PRESENS FUIT ARA DICATA / PĒSBITĒ HUIC TEMPLO PRĒĒ NUNC ANTONIUS ALMO / PINXIT QUEM GENUIT JACOBUS VERONA FIGURAS

Translation: "On September 5, 1397, Peter, son of the late Bartholomew of Bobis and a descendant of Paduan lineage, commissioned this work. Have mercy, Virgin Mother, on this devoted servant of yours! To whose praise this altar has been dedicated. Now that the venerable priest Anthony is in charge of this church, these figures were painted by Jacopo da Verona (son of Jacob of Verona)".

== Bibliography (in Italian) ==
- C. Bellinati, Padova da salvare: l'antica Chiesa dei Santi Arcangeli (S. Michele) in Padova e la Cappella affrescata da Jacopo da Verona (1397), Padova 1969, Civica BP.h.322.59
- Giotto e i cicli pittorici del Trecento a Padova, a cura di D. Banzato, M. Masenello, G. Valenzano, Milano 2015, pp. 113–117
- Banzato Davide, Jacopo da Verona e la Cappella di S. Maria, in "Padova e il suo territorio", Anno XXIII, 196 (nov/dic2018)
- Bibbia istoriata padovana della fine del Trecento: Pentateuco, Giosue, Ruth / a cura di Gianfranco Folena e Gian Lorenzo Mellini, 1962
- Duò Chiara, Nuovi contributi sugli affreschi della Cappella Bovi a San Michele, "Padova e il suo territorio", 26 (2011)
- Massimi Maria Elena, Jacopo da Verona, in Dizionario biografico degli italiani, vol. 62, Roma, Istituto dell'Enciclopedia Italiana, 2004
- Mori Giovanna, Jacopo da Verona, in "Padova e il suo territorio", Anno XVI, 90 (aprile 2001)/2001
- Mori Giovanna, Jacopo da Verona, in Giotto e il suo tempo, a cura di V. Sgarbi, Milano, 2000
