= Palazzo della Ragione, Padua =

Building in Padua, Italy

Coordinates: 45°24′26″N 11°52′31″E

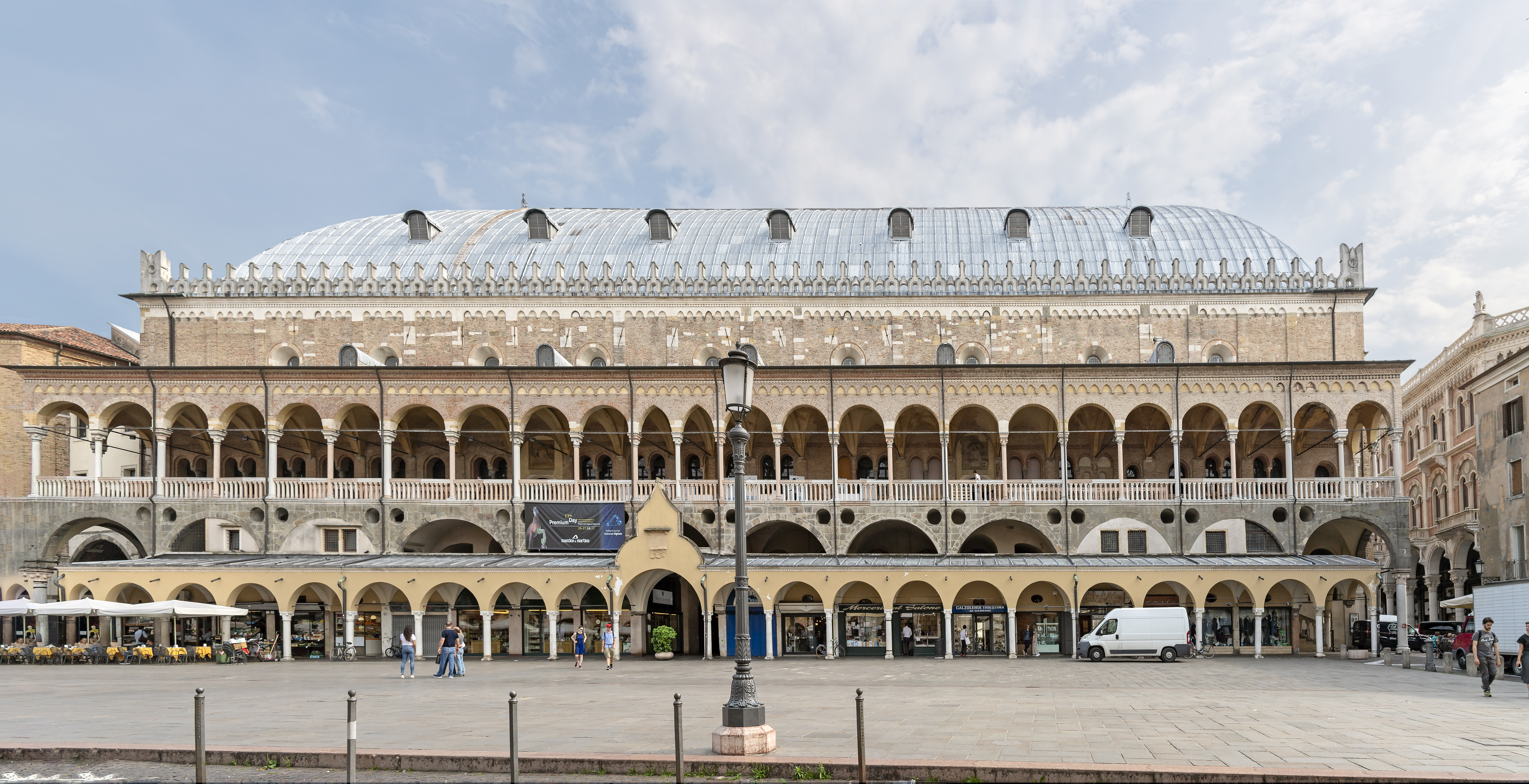
Palazzo della Ragione in Padua.

The Palazzo della Ragione is a medieval market hall, town hall and palace of justice building in Padua, in the Veneto region of Italy. The upper floor was dedicated to the town and justice administration; while the ground floor still hosts the historical covered market of the city. The palace separates the two market squares of Piazza delle Erbe from Piazza dei Frutti. It is popularly called il Salone ("the big hall"). It is included in the UNESCO World Heritage Site inscribed as "Padua’s fourteenth-century fresco cycles" in 2021.

== Description ==
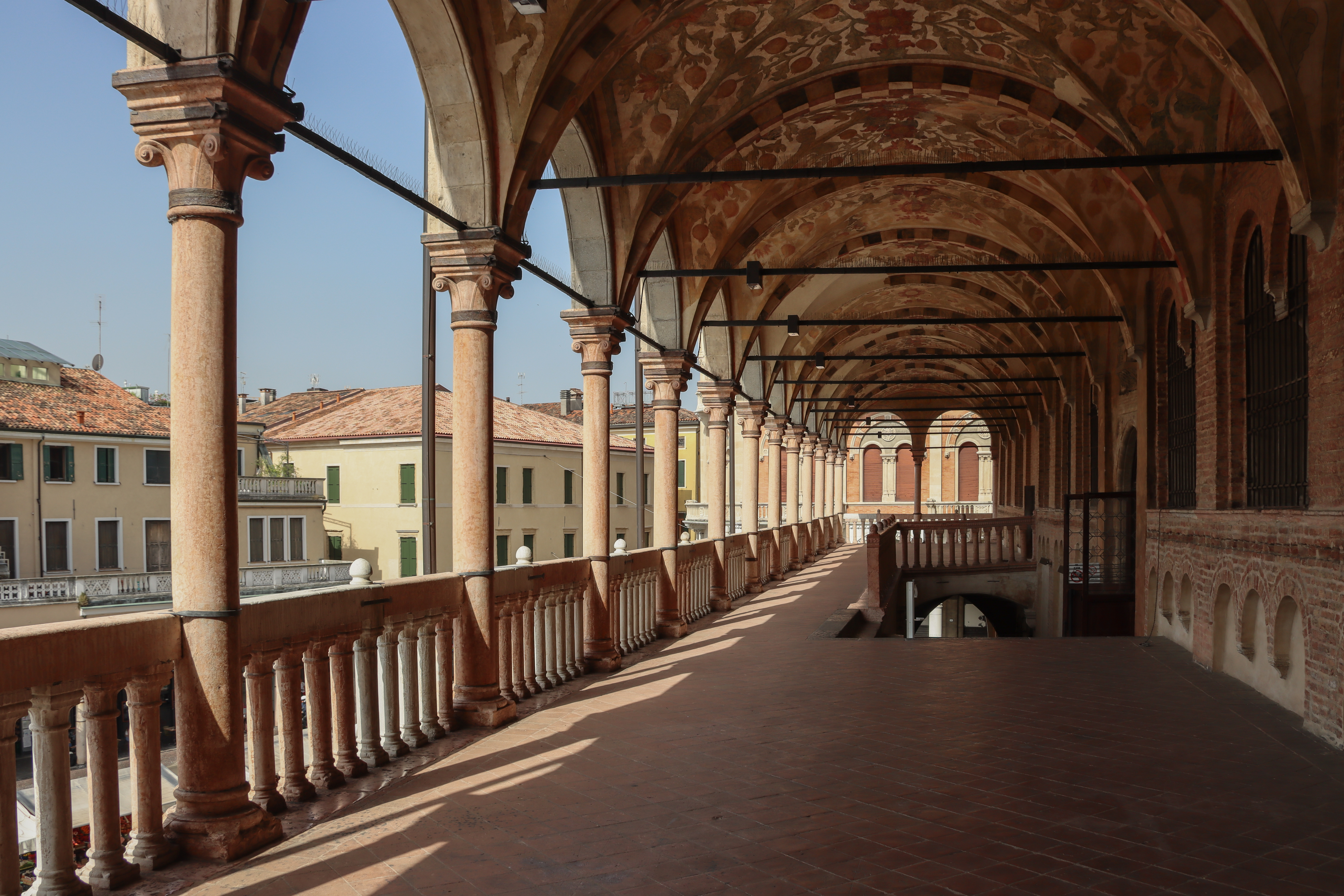
The loggia alongside the Salone

The building, with its great hall on the upper floor is believed to be one of the largest medieval halls still extant. The ground plan of the hall is not rectangular, but a parallelogram with a length of 81.5 m by 27 m, with a height 24 m. The building stands on arches, and the upper storey is flanked by an open loggia, not unlike that which surrounds the Basilica Palladiana in Vicenza, that was indeed inspired by Padua's Palazzo della Ragione.

The walls are entirely covered with allegorical frescoes. The gigantic wooden horse on the western side of the hall was built in 1466 and is modelled on Donatello's Equestrian statue of Gattamelata which is placed in front of the Saint Antony Basilica.

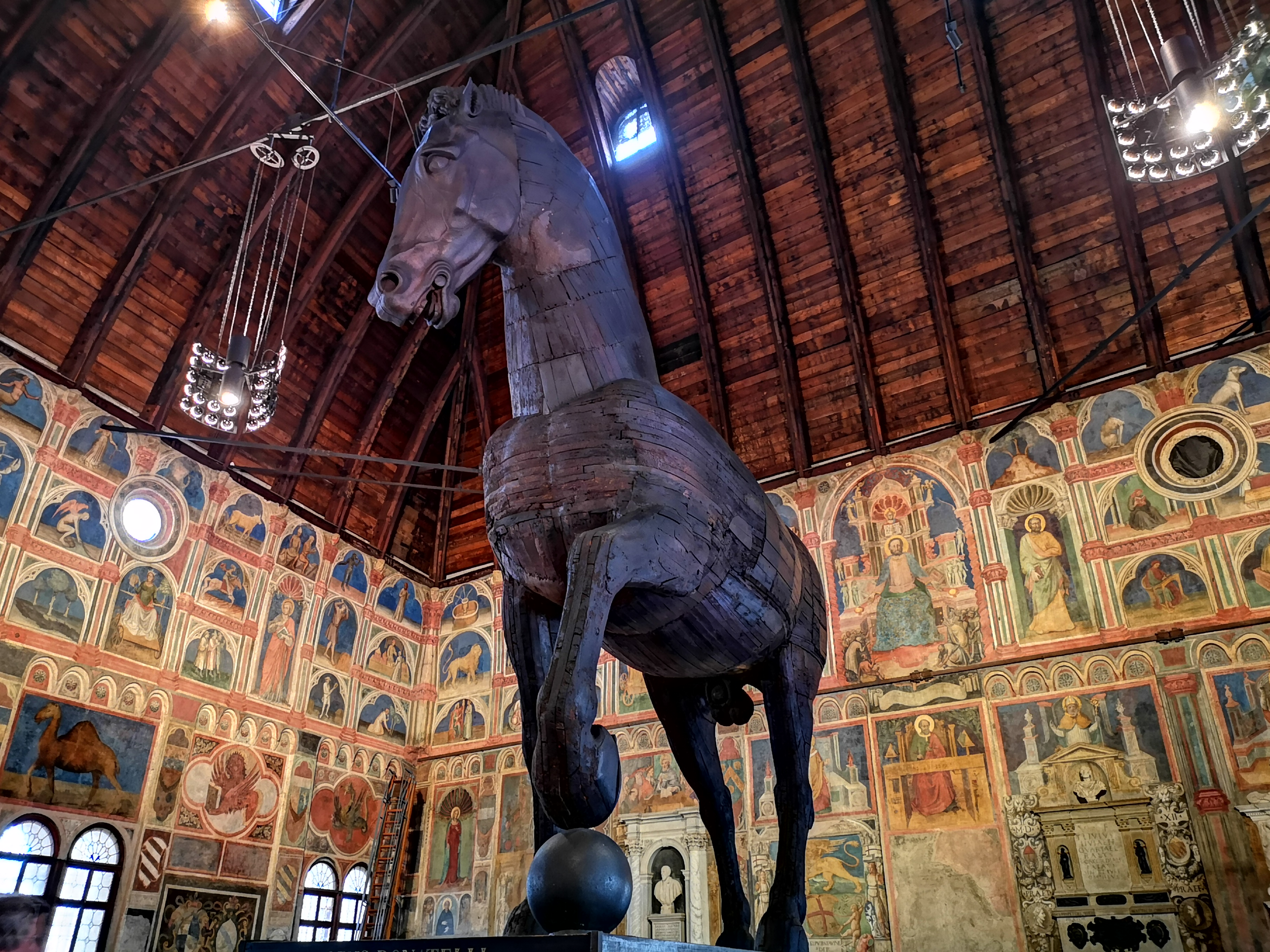
The wooden horse in the Great Hall

In the northeast corner of the hall is situated a particular tool: the pietra del vituperio ("stone of flout"). It is a stool of black stone which was located in the middle of the hall in the Middle Ages and was used to publicly humiliate insolvent debtors, who were obliged to sit there as in the stocks.

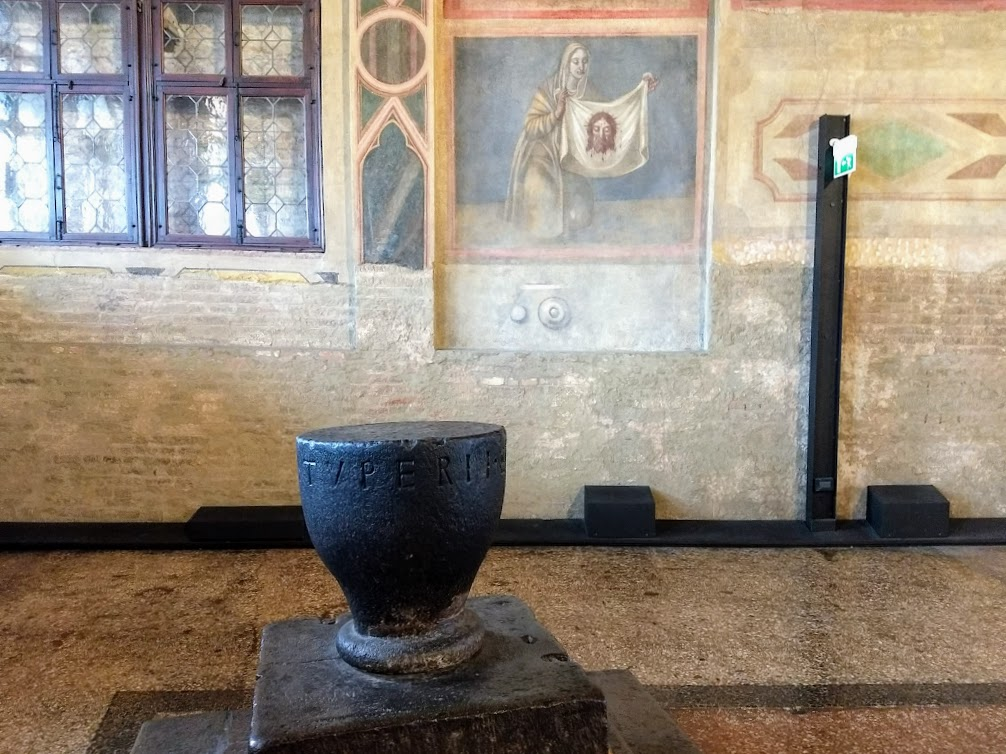
The Pietra del Vituperio, used for public humiliations of insolvent debtors

The ground floor has hosted the market hall of the city for 800 years and is likely the oldest in the European Union. Originally dedicated to the commerce of a wide selection of food, clothes, spices, and jewels; it is today mostly active in the food and beverage sector.

== History ==
The Palazzo was begun in 1172 and completed in 1219. Originally there were three roofs, spanning the three separate chambers into which the hall was divided. In 1306, Fra Giovanni, an Augustinian friar, covered the whole building with a single roof. The internal partition walls remained until the fire of 1420, when the Venetian architects who undertook the restoration removed them, throwing all three spaces into one and forming the present great hall, the Salone.

Giotto had been the first painter to fresco the walls. The reconstructed space was frescoed anew by Nicolò Miretto and Stefano da Ferrara, working from 1425 to 1440 to cover the surface of more than 2000 m^{2}. Some of the frescoes depict the astrological theories of Pietro d'Abano, a professor at Padua University in the 13th century.

A tornado destroyed the roof and damaged the building on 17 August 1756.

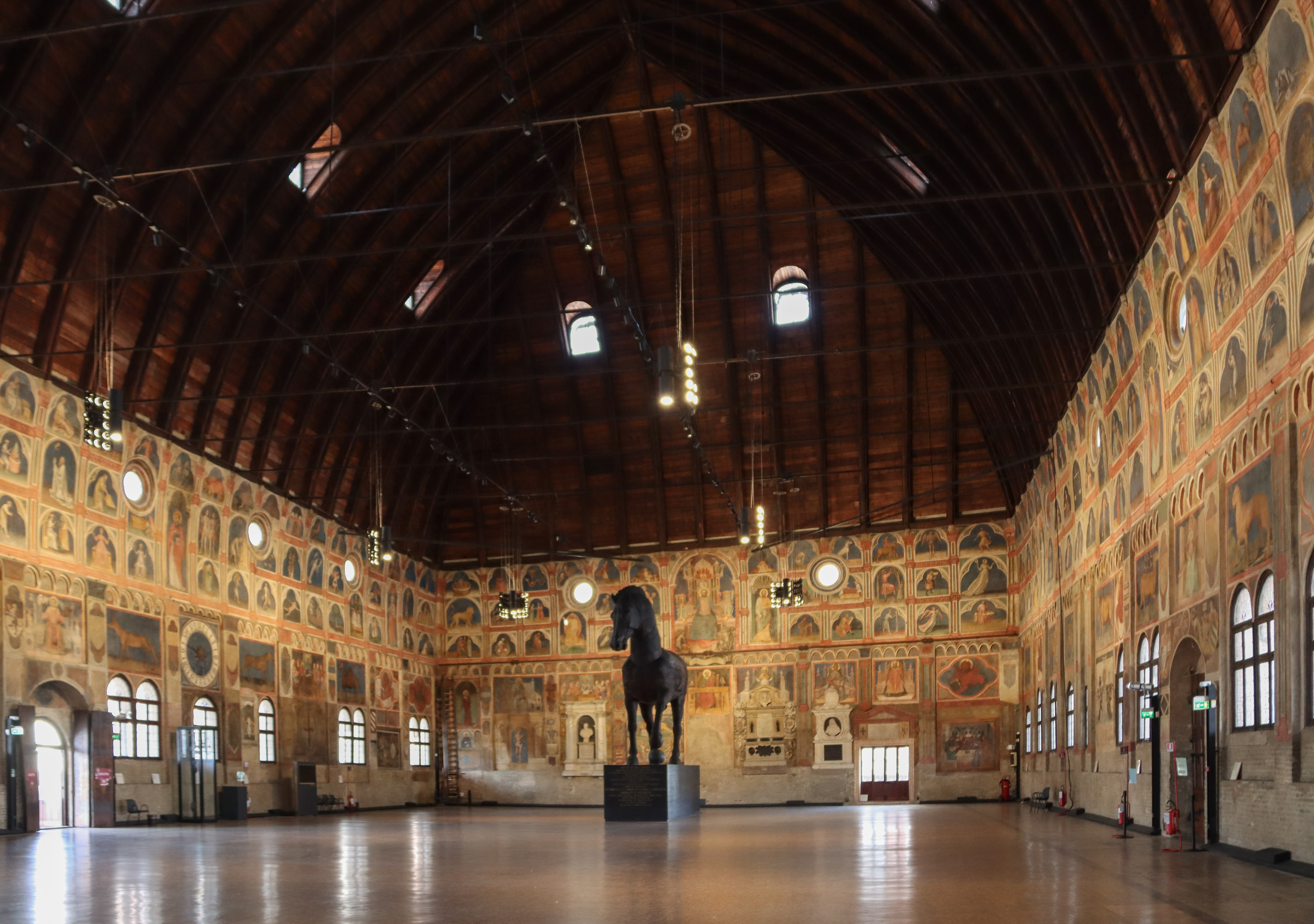
Il Salone

== The frescoes ==
In the great hall (il Salone), all four walls are entirely occupied by frescoes. The decoration consists of more than three hundred different scenes divided into two sections: the upper area, dating back to the fifteenth century, contains scenes that develop over three levels and shows that each month of the year corresponds to certain signs of the zodiac, trades and character traits. The lower area is less densely decorated and contains parts of the 14th-century frescoes. These are probably related to the frescoes in the upper zone, though it should be taken into consideration that they were painted according to the functions of the different spaces in which the hall was divided. For example, there are frescoes separated by traces left by the tribunal benches which once lined the walls, and by symbols associated with them. This is a reminder of the original function of the Palazzo della Ragione as a court of law.

On the southern wall is a relief showing a golden sun. At midday, a ray of sunlight passes through its mouth and strikes the floor along a meridan line. This feature was created by Bortolomeo Ferracina in 1761.
