= Luigi Bottazzo =

Italian composer

Luigi Bottazzo (9 July 1845 – 29 December 1924) was an Italian organist and composer.

== Life ==
=== Early years ===
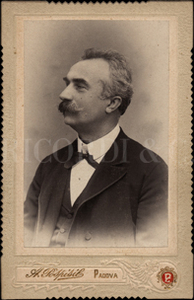
Luigi Botazzo c.1901–10 by A. Pospisil.

Bottazzo was born in Presina di Piazzola, Padua, Italy. At the age of nine he was permanently blinded in an accident. He received a musical education in counterpoint, organ and piano at Padua's Institute for the Blind, where at the age of nineteen he joined the staff.

=== Career ===
In 1865, he was appointed organist of the church of Santa Croce, Padua. In 1872 he was appointed the organist of the Basilica of Saint Anthony of Padua. Throughout his life Bottazzo was a keen supporter of liturgical reform and a proponent of the Cecilian Movement in church music.

In 1895, he joined the staff of Conservatorio di Musica di Padova as organ teacher and as a result published several pedagogical works, and a history of sacred music in Italy.

Bottazzo died in Padua on 29 December 1924.

== Works ==
Bottazzo's catalogue of more than 500 works, includes music for piano, harmonoium and organ, solo, chamber and orchestral works, songs, and liturgical music, with over 40 mass-settings to his name.

=== Musical ===
- 25 Trios, op. 101;
- 24 Preludi facili, op. 104;
- 100 Versetti, op. 105 (2 volumi);
- Preludio per G.O., op. 113;
- 6 Pezzi per organo, op. 120;
- la Santa Messa, op. 126;
- Corale ed Offertorio, op. 194;
- Missa Pastoralis ad duas voces aequales, op. 198
- Messa Breve e Facile a due voci dispari in onore di San Martino vescovo, op. 201
- 7 Marce religiose, op. 204;
- Piccola Suite, op. 207;
- Messa VIII "Degli angeli", op. 208 a
- Sonata in Re minore, op. 210;
- Messa S.Teresa del Bambin Gesù, op.229;
- Messa S.Clara Vergine, op.262;
- Laudate Eum in Chordis et Organo, op. 269 (sette entrate solenni);
- XII Motecta Natalicia ad chorum unius vocis mediae, op. 278
- 4 Pastorali, op. 279;
- Missa pro Defunctis, op. 281;
- Messa S.Tarcisio, op.318;
- Laus Tibi Christe, op. 339;
- Messa nuziale, op. 368;
- Missa in honorem S. Luciae ad duas voces aequales, op. 180
- Pange lingua, op 347 a
- Ave Maris Stella, op. 347 b

=== Writings ===
- (n.d.) | Brevi nozioni sulle forme musicali (Turin).
- (n.d.) | L'organista di chiesa. Breve metodo per organo (Milan, n.d.).
- (n.d.) | Studi sulla periodologia musicale (Padua).
- (n.d.) | e Metodo teorico-pratico di armonia (Padua).
- (1901) | L'armonium quale strumento liturgico. Metodo teorico-pratico (Turin).
- (1901) | L'allievo al piano. Metodo teorico-pratico per imparare a suonare il pianoforte (Turin).
- (1902) | Sul vero significato di due termini musicali (Padua).
- (1905) | Metodo di canto corale ad uso delle scholae cantorum (Turin).
- (1926) | Memorie storiche sulla riforma della musica sacra in Italia (Padua).
