= Basilica of Saint Anthony of Padua =

- Basilica Pontificia di Sant'Antonio di Padova
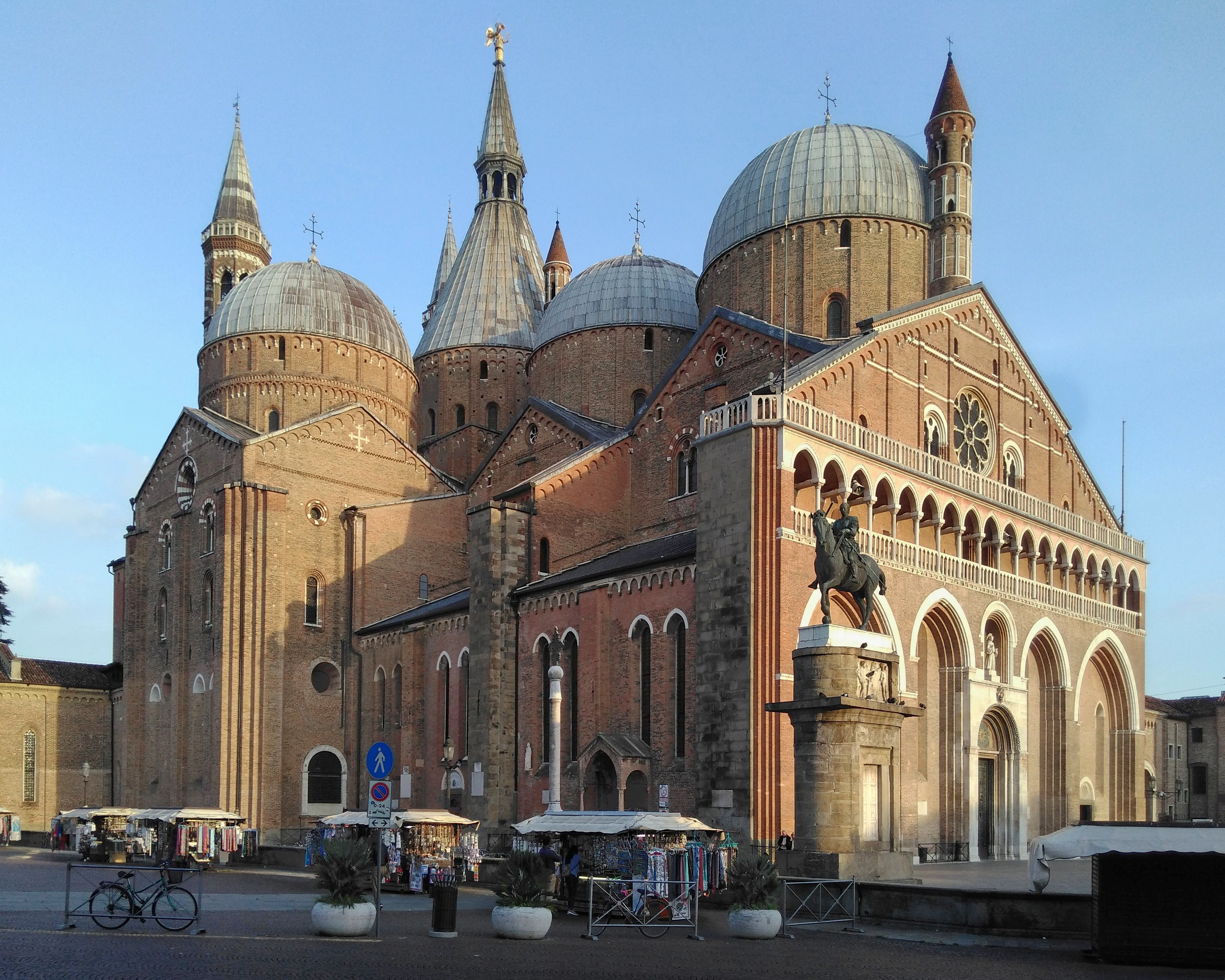
- Basilica di Sant'Antonio di Padova
- Basilica of Saint Anthony of Padua
- 45°24′05″N 11°52′51″E
- Location: Padua, Veneto, Italy
- Denomination: Catholic Church

History
- Status: Pontifical minor basilica, International shrine
- Dedication: St. Anthony of Padua

Architecture
- Groundbreaking: 1232
- Completed: 1310

Administration
- Diocese: Diocese of Padua

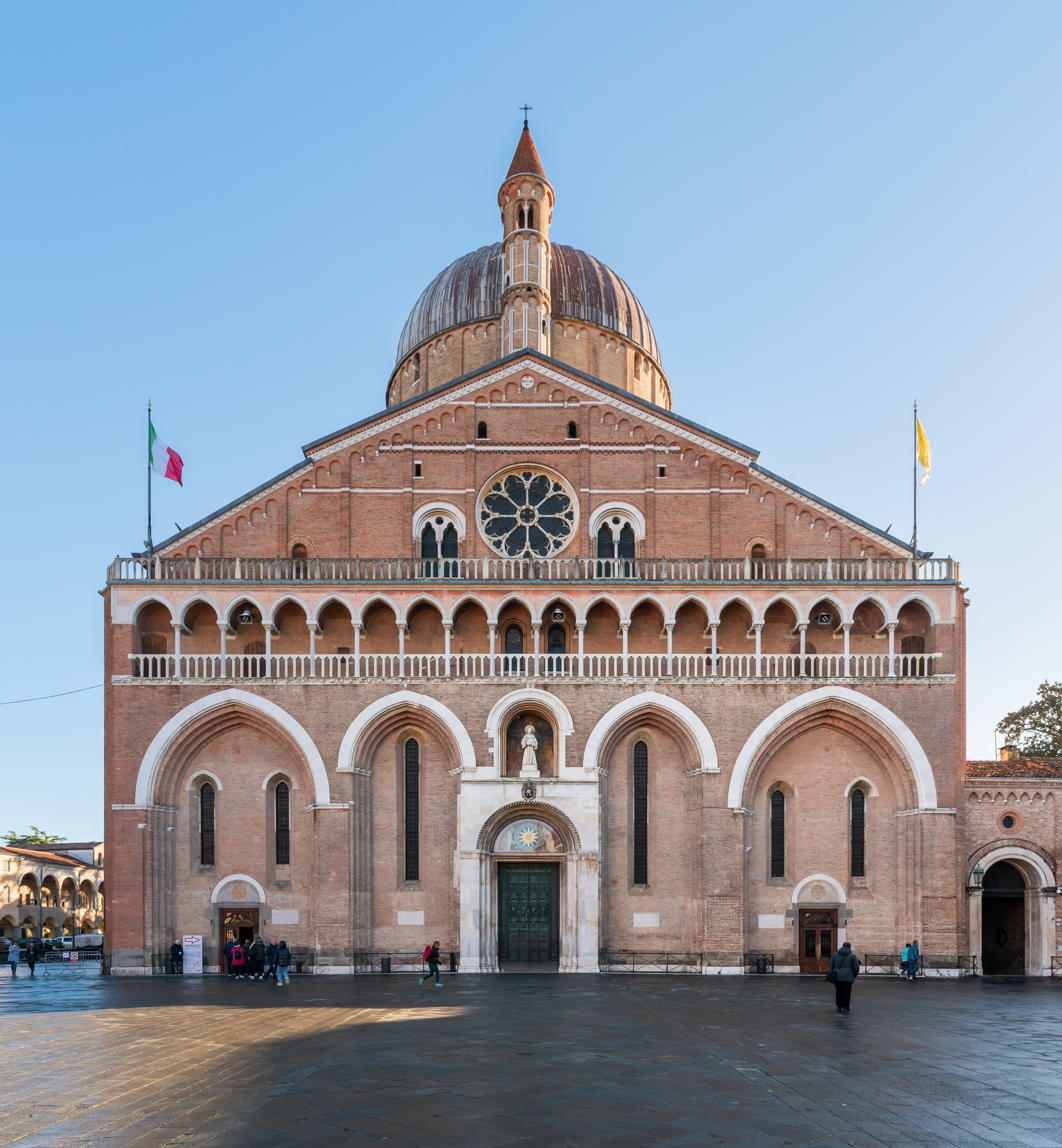
The west façade of St. Anthony on the Piazza del Santo

The Pontifical Basilica of Saint Anthony of Padua (Italian: Basilica Pontificia di Sant'Antonio di Padova) is a Catholic church and minor basilica in Padua, Veneto, Northern Italy, dedicated to Saint Anthony of Padua. The shrine is designated a Basilica by the privilege of immemorial status.

The shrine is not the cathedral of the city, which is designated to the Cathedral-Basilica of Saint Mary of Padua. The basilica is known locally as "il Santo" and is one of the national shrines recognized by the Holy See.

Two chapels within the basilica - the Cappella di San Giacomo and the Cappella del Beato Luca Belludi - are part of the UNESCO World Heritage Site Padua's fourteenth-century fresco cycles, inscribed in 2021. The Cappella di San Giacomo and the Cappella del beato Luca Belludi — are included in the UNESCO World Heritage Site Padua's fourteenth-century fresco cycles, inscribed in 2021.

== History ==
Construction of the Basilica probably began around 1232, just one year after the death of St. Anthony. It was completed in 1310 although several structural modifications (including the falling of the ambulatory and the construction of a new choir screen) took place between the end of the 14th and the mid-15th century. The Saint, according to his will, had been buried in the small church of Santa Maria Mater Domini, probably dating from the late 12th century and near which a convent was founded by him in 1229. This church was incorporated into the present basilica as the Cappella della Madonna Mora (Chapel of the Dark Madonna).

== Architecture ==
Sant'Antonio is a giant edifice without a precise architectural style. Over the centuries, it has grown under a variety of different influences as shown by the exterior details. It displays a strong influence of St Mark's Basilica in Venice.

The new basilica was begun as a single-naved church, like that of St Francis of Assisi, with an apsidal chancel, broad transepts and two square nave bays roofed with hemispherical domes like that of San Marco, Venice. The exterior style is a mixing of mainly Romanesque and Byzantine elements, with some Gothic features.

Later in the 13th century, the aisles were added in a more Gothic style, the length of each nave bay being divided into two aisle bays with pointed arches and quadripartite vaults.

The eastern apse was also extended in the Gothic style, receiving a ribbed vault and nine radiating chapels in the French manner. Later also, the Treasury chapel was built in 1691 in the Baroque style by Filippo Parodi, a pupil of Bernini.

Externally, the brick facade has a Romanesque central section which was extended outwards when the aisles were built, acquiring in the process four deep Gothic recesses and an elegant arcaded balcony which stretches across the broad front of the building. The facade gable shows little differentiation between the nave and aisle, screening the very large buttresses that have the same profile and form a richly sculptural feature when the building is viewed from the side.

The domes, like the domes of St. Mark's Basilica, were raised in height externally, giving a Byzantine appearance to the building, while the multitude of small belfries which accompany the domes recall Turkish minarets. Externally, at the main roof line each section of the building is marked by a low gable decorated with blind arcading in brick. These gables combine with the domes, the broad buttresses and the little towers to create a massive sculptural form, both diverse and unified in its conglomeration of features. An extra dimension is added to the facade by the huge plinth and dynamic Equestrian statue of Gattamelata by Donatello.

Established in 1396 the Veneranda Arca di S. Antonio is the organisation tasked with the conservation and maintenance of the structure belonging to the Basilica di St. Anthony of Padua and its connected buildings.

== Artworks and treasures ==
The high altar is by Donatello. The interior of the church contains numerous funerary monuments, some of noteworthy artistic value. The Chapel of the Blessed Sacrament (Cappella del Santissimo Sacramento, also known as Cappella Gattamelata), in the right aisle, houses the tomb of the condottiero Gattamelata and of his son Giannantonio. The bronze tabernacle is made by Girolamo Campagna. This chapel, with its broad bands of polychrome and carved Gothic details, has had many stages of decoration, the final stage being the creation of a mosaic in the tall rear niche representing the Holy Spirit with rays of golden light descending against a background of intensely blue sky. This work was created by Lodovico Pogliaghi between 1927 and 1936.

Relics of St Anthony are to be found in the ornate Baroque Treasury Chapel (begun in 1691). The body of the saint, which was in the Madonna Mora Chapel, has, from 1350, lain in a separate transept chapel, the Chapel of St Anthony, the interior decoration being attributed to Tullio Lombardo, who also provided the sixth and seventh reliefs depicting the miracles of St Anthony (Miracle of the stingy man's heart, Miracle of the repentant man). The third relief Saint bringing back to life a man who had been murdered is a masterpiece by Girolamo Campagna. The late-16th century statues are by Tiziano Aspetti.

The Basilica contains several important images of the Madonna. The Madonna Mora is a statue of the Madonna with the Christ Child by the French sculptor Rainaldino di Puy-l'Evéque, dating from 1396. Her name refers to her black hair and olive skin tone, being interpreted as "swarthy".

The Madonna del Pilastro is a mid-14th-century fresco by Stefano da Ferrara, located on the pier adjacent the left aisle.

Among other sculptural work is the Easter candelabrum in the apse, finished in 1515 by Andrea Briosco and considered his masterwork. The high altar area features the bronze Madonna with Child and six statues of Saints by Donatello, who also executed four reliefs with episodes of life of St. Anthony.

To the right hand side of the nave, opposite the tomb of the Saint is the large Chapel of St. James, commissioned by Bonifacio Lupi in the 1370s in Gothic style, with frescoed walls depicting the Stories of St. James and the Crucifixion by Altichiero da Zevio. There are several frescoes created by Girolamo Tessari.

The chin and tongue of St. Anthony are displayed in a gold reliquary at the Basilica.

Padua’s fourteenth-century fresco cycles
UNESCO World Heritage Site
- Interactive map of Padua’s fourteenth-century fresco cycles
- Criteria: Cultural: (ii), (iii)
- Reference: 1623
- Inscription: 2021 (44th Session)
- Website: www.basilicadelsanto.org

Interior of St. Anthony

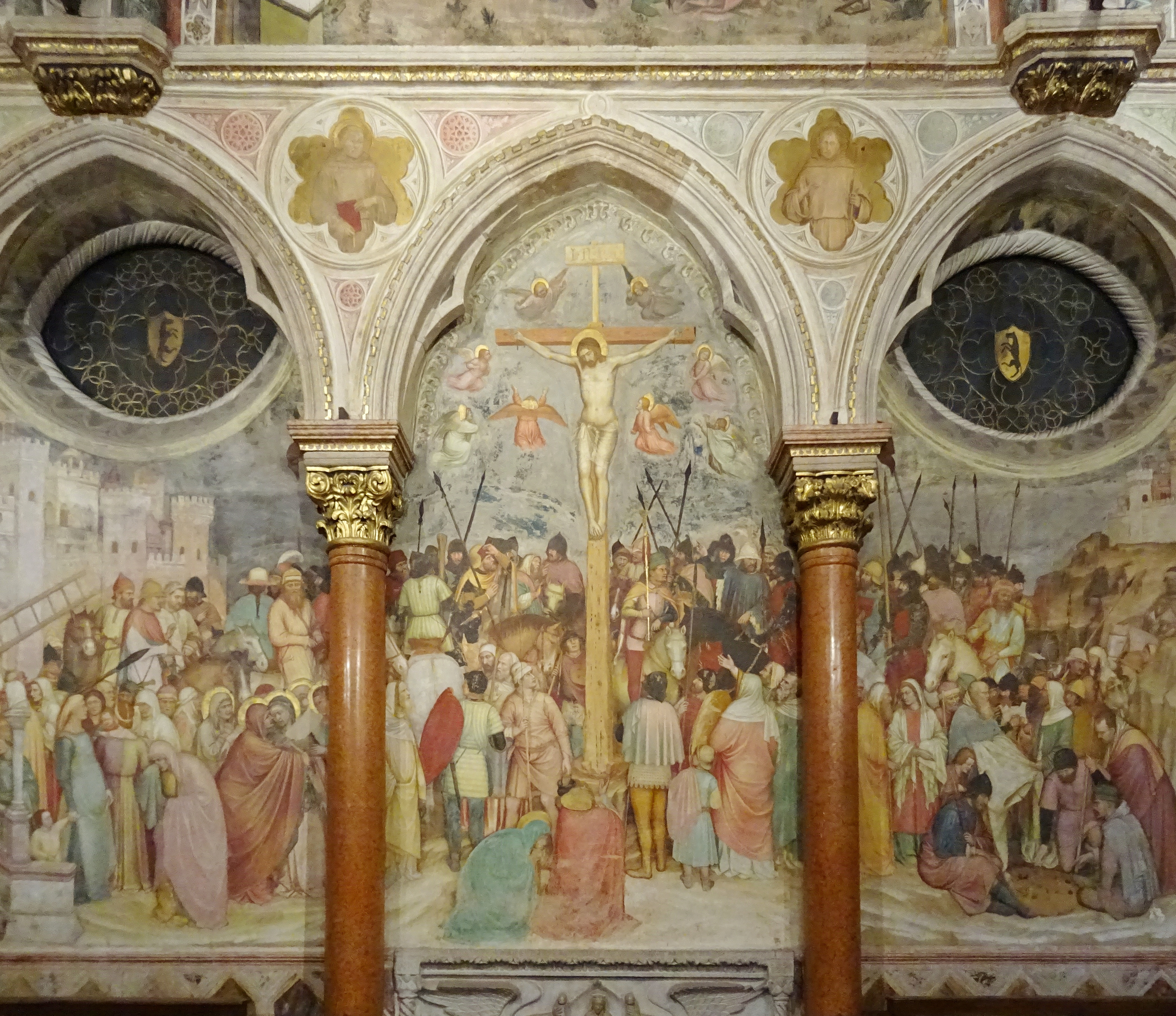
Frescoes by Altichiero da Zevio in the St. James Chapel (1370s)

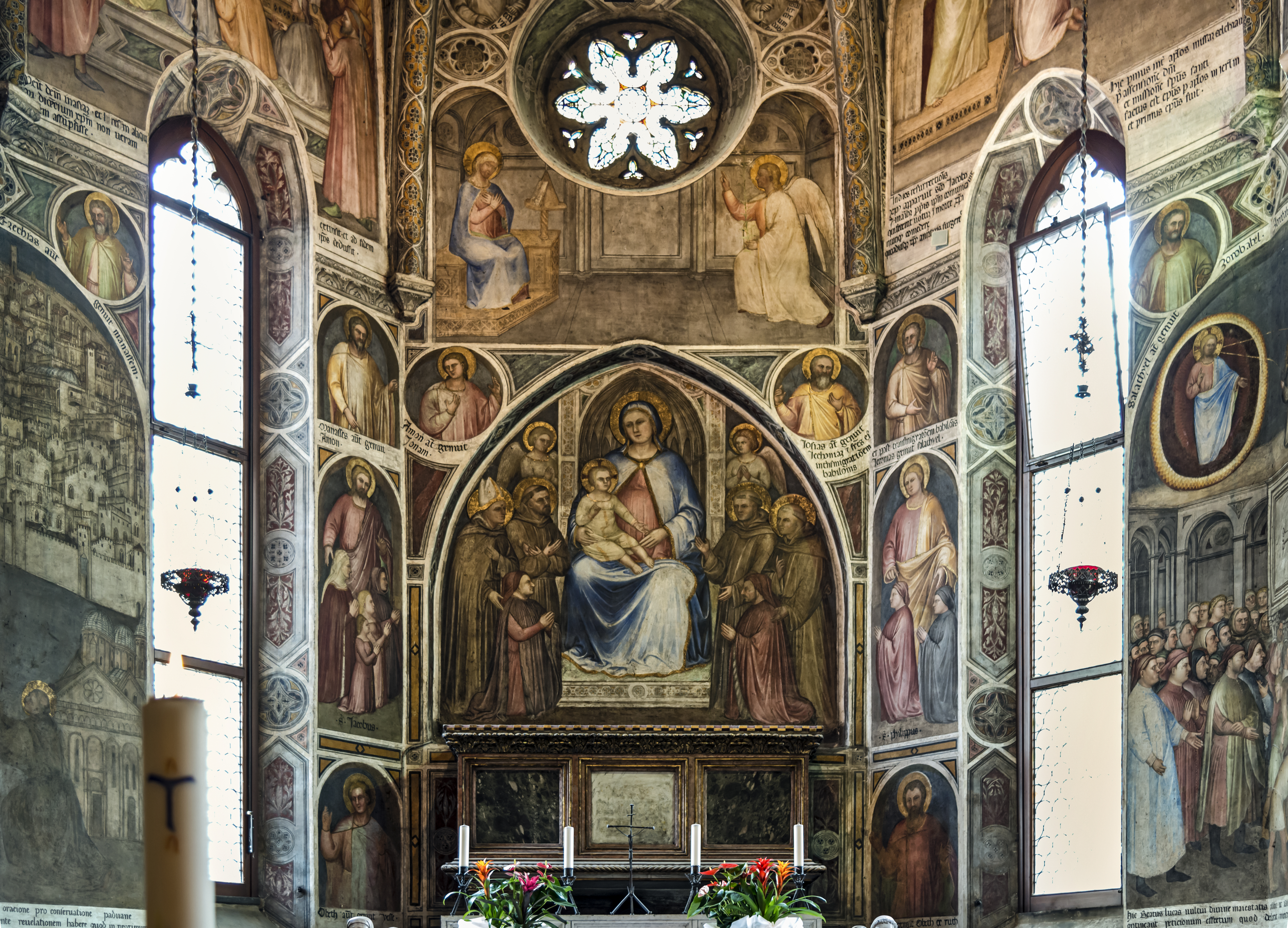
Chapel of Beato Luca Belludi with frescos by Giusto de' Menabuoi

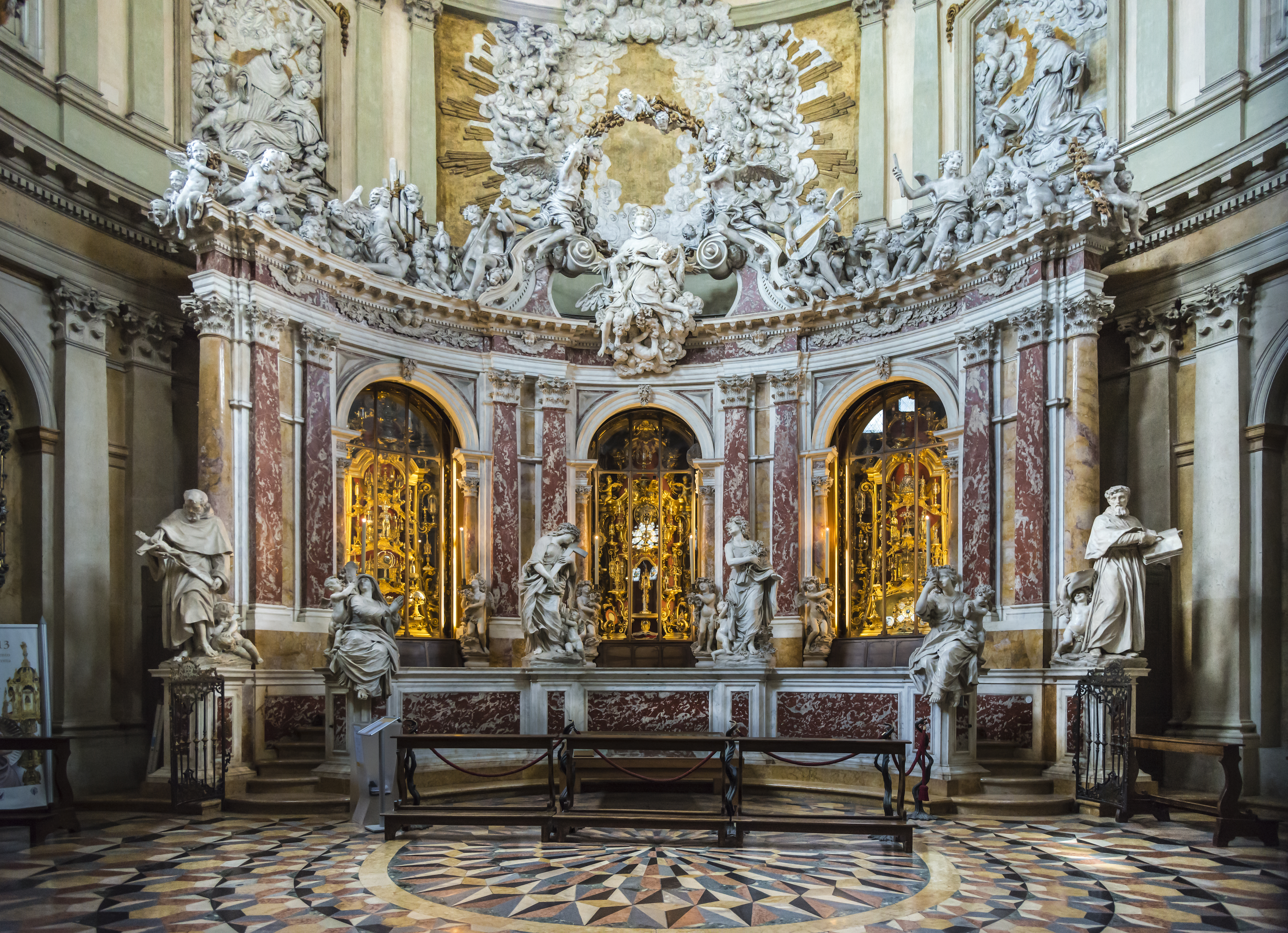
Chapel of the Reliquaries

== Musical history ==
The composer Francesco Antonio Calegari served as maestro di cappella in the 1720s. Giuseppe Tartini, the Baroque composer and violinist, also served as maestro di cappella in the 18th century. In 1872 Luigi Bottazzo was appointed organist.

== Burials ==
Coat of arms of the Basilica of Saint Anthony.

- Costanzo Porta
- Edward Courtenay, 1st Earl of Devon (His remains were removed from the Basilica at some unknown date to a location unknown.)

== See also ==
- High medieval domes
- Church of Saint Anthony of Lisbon
- Padua Cathedral
- Church of the Holy Apostles
