= Jacopo da Verona =

Italian painter

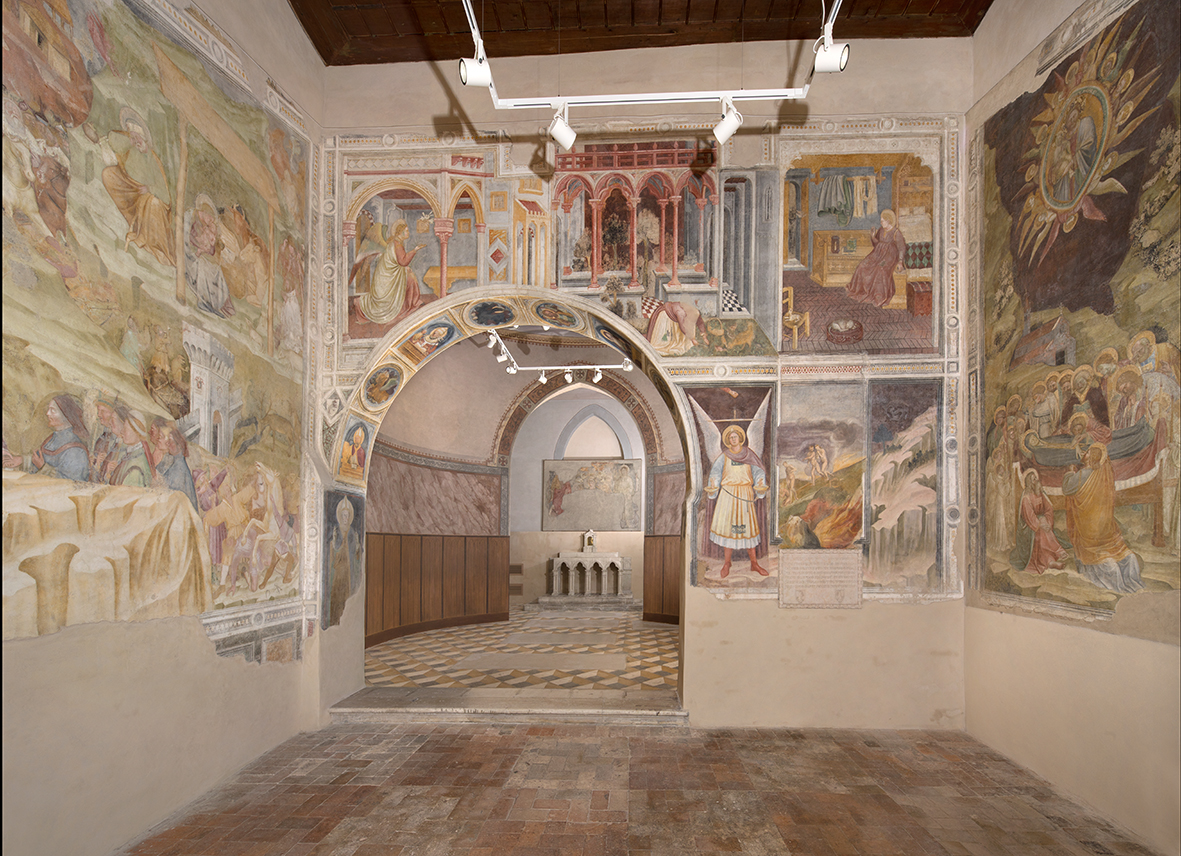
Frescoes of San Michele

Jacopo da Verona (1355–1442/1443) was an Italian painter. As his name suggests, he was born in Verona. His works include the frescoes of the San Michele Oratory in Padua.

Little is known about Jacopo da Verona's life. The first mention of him is in a notarial deed dated 1833, which records an investiture of land in his favour. He is referred to as "magistrum Jacopum pictorem" (Master Jacopo the painter), and the document indicates he lived in the Contrada of Santa Cecilia in Verona. There are no certain records about his training as a painter.

== Artistic Production ==
Jacopo da Verona's only certain work is the fresco cycle in the Bovi Chapel, now part of the San Michele Oratory. The artist's name and the completion year, 1397, are inscribed on a dedicatory plaque inside the chapel.

In addition to the frescoes in the Oratory of San Michele, Jacopo da Verona is credited with other works, mainly in the Veneto region. Pietro Toesca, in the 1927 edition of Storia dell'arte italiana, attributes to Jacopo the Polyptych in the Church of Boi di Caprino (Verona, Museo di Castelvecchio) and fresco fragments on the tomb of Ilario Sanguinazzi in one of the chapels in the church of the Eremitani in Padua.
