= Padua Baptistery =

Baptistery building in Padua, Italy

Coordinates: 45.4068°N 11.8718°E

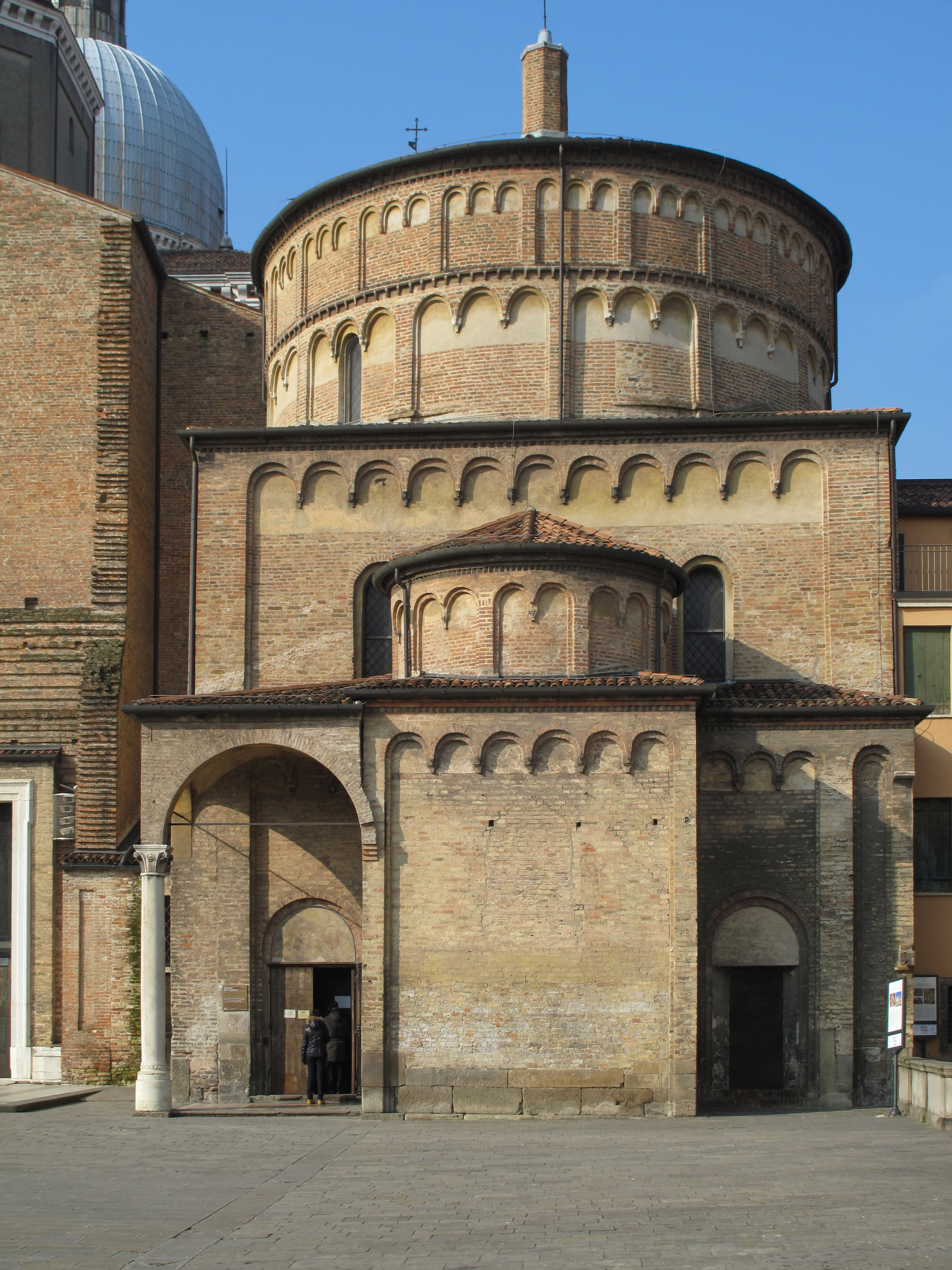
Exterior

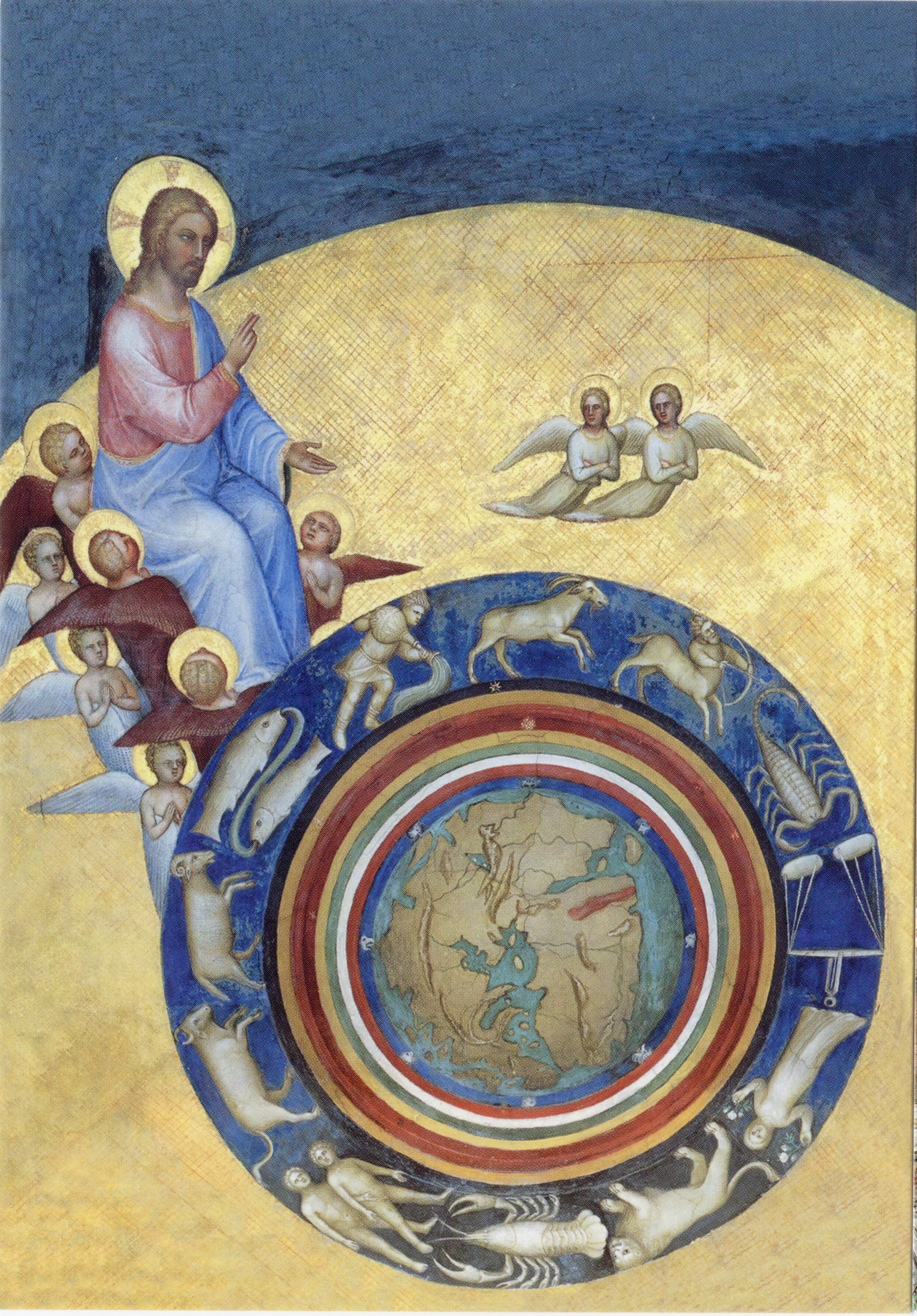
The creation of the world

The Padua Baptistery, dedicated to St. John the Baptist, is a baptistery on the Piazza del Duomo next to the cathedral in Padua, Italy. Preserved inside is one of the most important fresco cycles of the 14th century, a masterpiece by Giusto de' Menabuoi. It is part of the UNESCO World Heritage Site Padua's fourteenth-century fresco cycles, inscribed in 2021 for its outstanding cultural and artistic significance.

== History ==
The construction of the baptistery began in the 12th century, probably on top of an existing structure; it underwent various reworkings in the following century, and was consecrated by Guido, patriarch of Grado, in 1281. Between 1370 and 1379 it was restored and adapted as a mausoleum for prince Francesco il Vecchio da Carrara and his wife, Fina Buzzaccarini. The latter oversaw the decorative work, entrusting it to Giusto de' Menabuoi (whose burial site was later found outside the building). With the fall of the House of Da Carrara in 1405, Venetian soldiers demolished the grand burial monuments and covered the numerous emblems of Francesco il Vecchio with green paint. After various partial restorations in the 20th century, the work is currently awaiting an important full restoration.

== Description ==
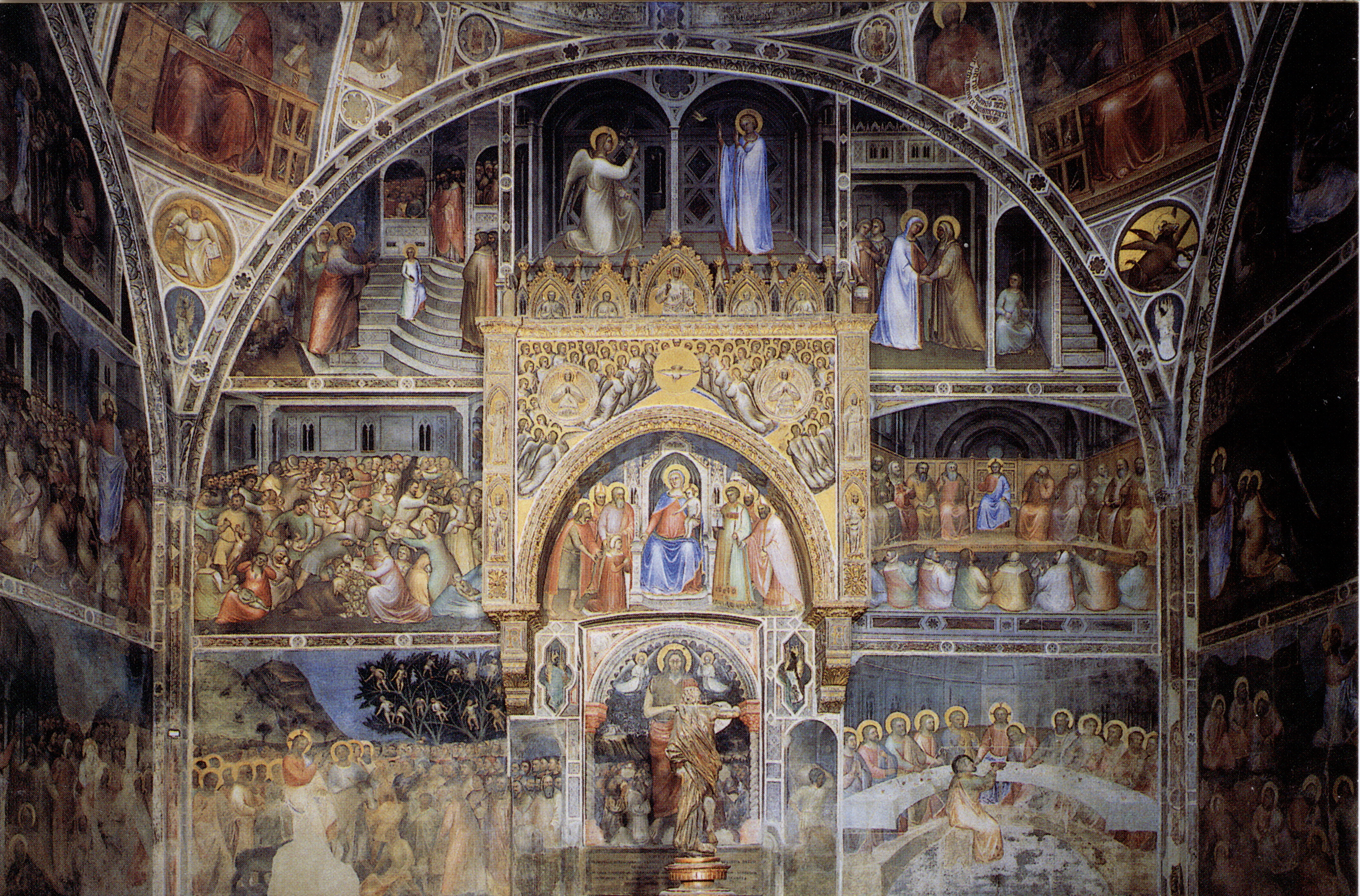
A frescoed wall

The fresco cycle decorating the walls, painted between 1375 and 1376 by Giusto de' Menabuoi, is considered a masterpiece. With respect to previous works, Padua must have been struck by the Romanesque and Byzantine rigidity, as can be seen in the Paradise of the baptistery's cupola: the scene is organized around a Christ Pantocrator, around which turns a hypnotic wheel with multi-layered spokes made of angels and saints, whose golden halos as seen from below seem to be the work of a magnificent goldsmith. At the center of the Paradise is also the Mother of God. The paintings that cover the walls show scenes from the life of St. John the Baptist (to the left of the entrance), Mary, and Jesus.

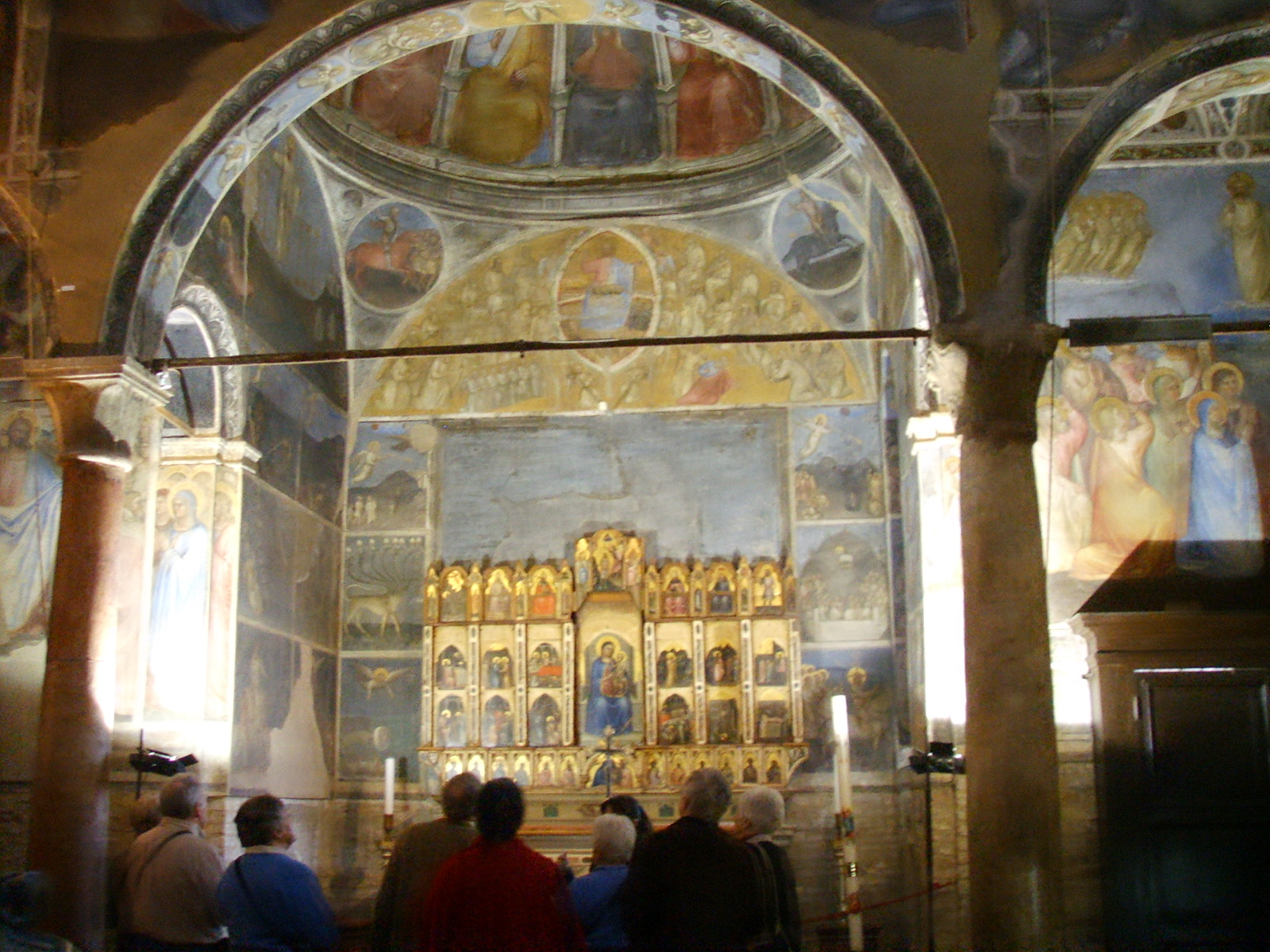
Polyptych by Giusto de' Menabuoi on the baptistery altar

On the walls adjacent to the altar are represented the Crucifixion and the Descent of the Holy Spirit (frescoed on the cupola of the altar), and a large polyptych, also by Guisto de' Menabuoi, sits on the altar itself. Painted on the walls surrounding the altar, in the apse, are monstrous figures and images of the Book of Revelation.

In the tholobate are scenes from the book of Genesis, while prophets and evangelists look down from the pendentives; and here a less Byzantine flair is demonstrated, presenting figures that have been inserted into life-like spaces illusionistically depicted. Also in the stories of Christ and John the Baptist, frescoed on the walls, appear finely calculated architectural representations into which the painter has inserted his solemn, static images. The figures represented in the surrounding scenes, however, appear freer, for example in the Wedding Feast at Cana, where a group of servants moves naturally about the room in contrast to the static diners. From the analysis of these stylistic choices it is clear that the use of rétro effects was for Giusto a precise component willingly chosen to bring about an expressive and symbolic end: he was perhaps the only 14th century painter with the presence of mind to make conscious selections among these different pictorial languages.

In the scene of the creation of the world the zodiac show Christ's function as Lord of cosmic time. God the Father can interrupt the course of natural events to manifest His will to mankind: which occurred during the three hours of darkness that accompanied the agony and death of Jesus. Through his angels, represented here, God dominates and neutralizes the influence of the planetary demons here in the world underneath the moon.

== See also ==
- High medieval domes
- Padua's fourteenth-century fresco cycles

== Bibliography ==
- Guida d'Italia (serie Guide Rosse) - Veneto, Touring Club Italiano, ISBN 88-365-0441-8

== Images ==
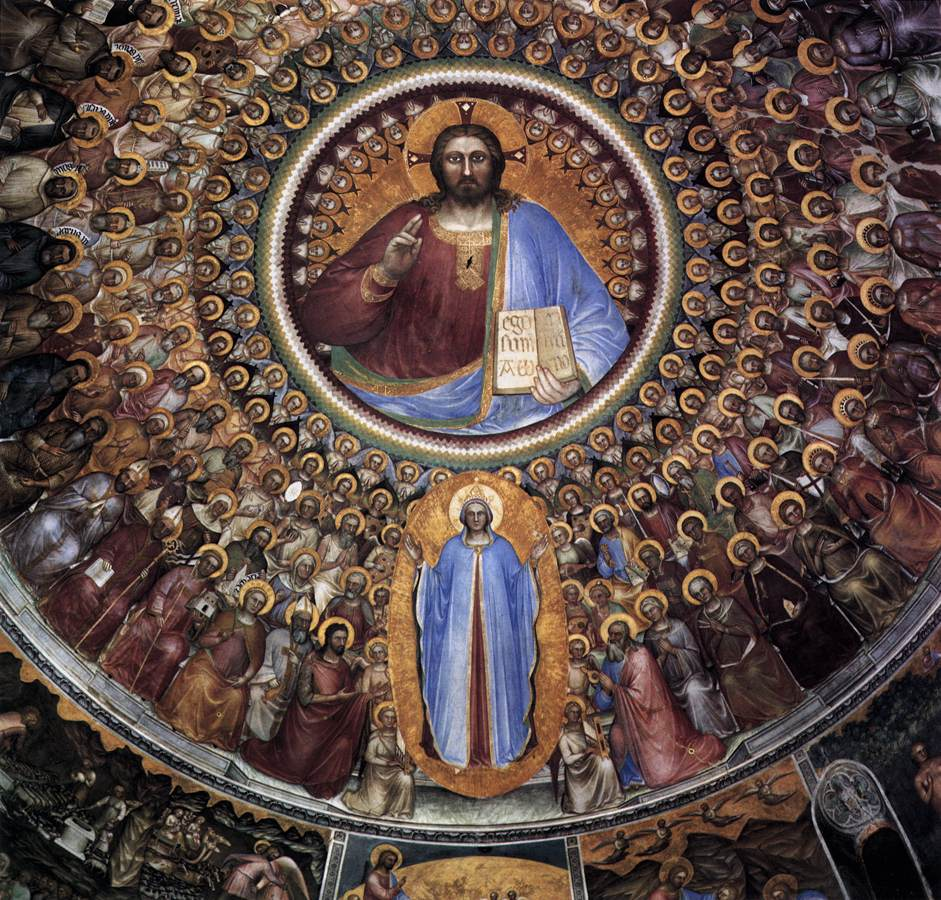
Underneath the cupola

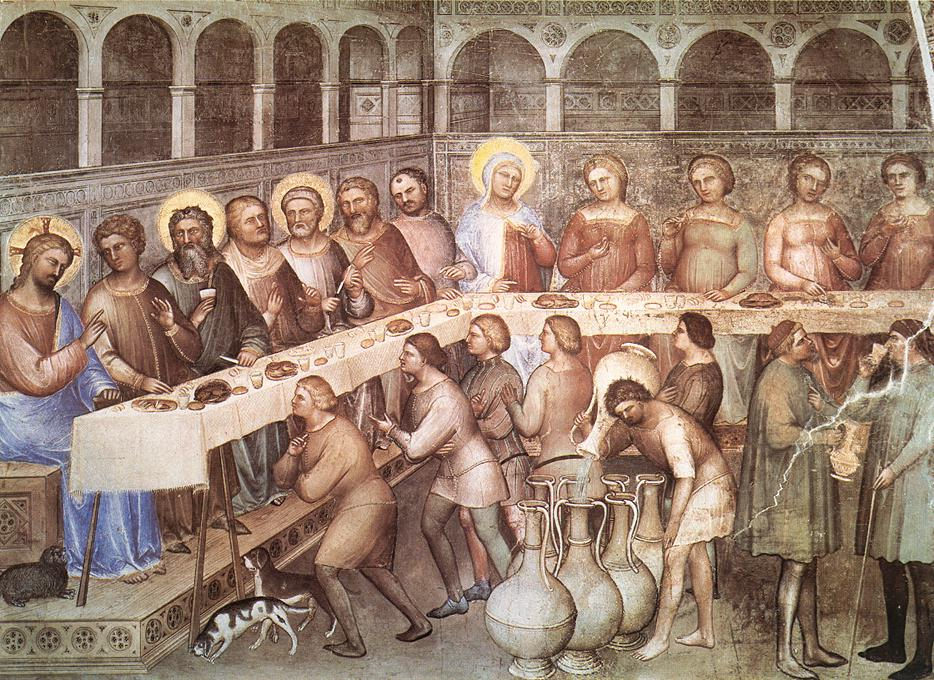
The wedding feast of Cana

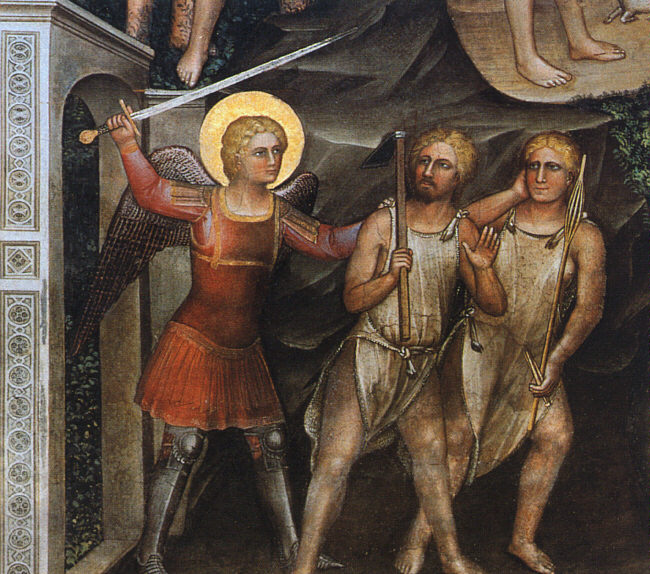
Adam and Even thrown out of the Garden of Eden

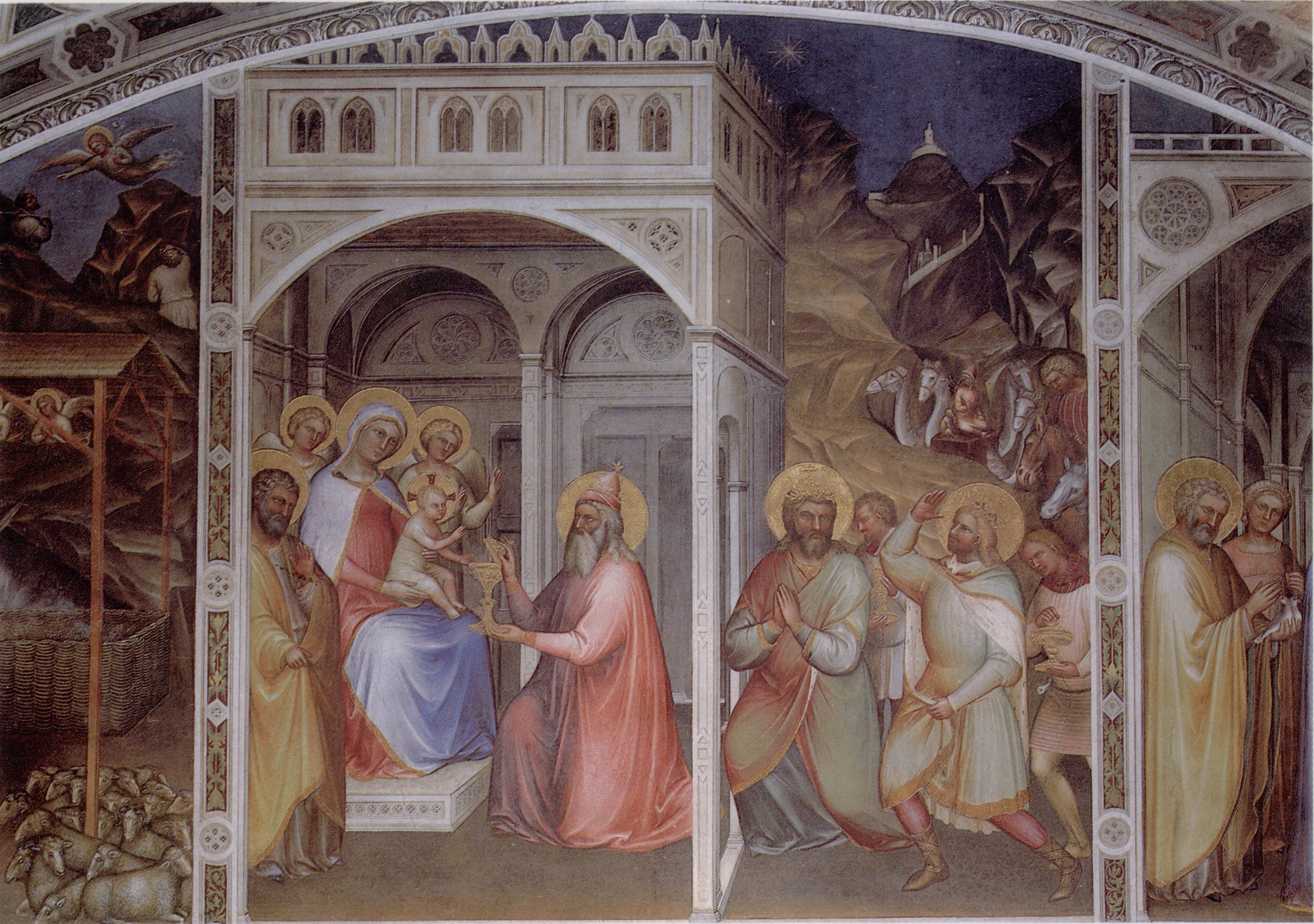
The three kings

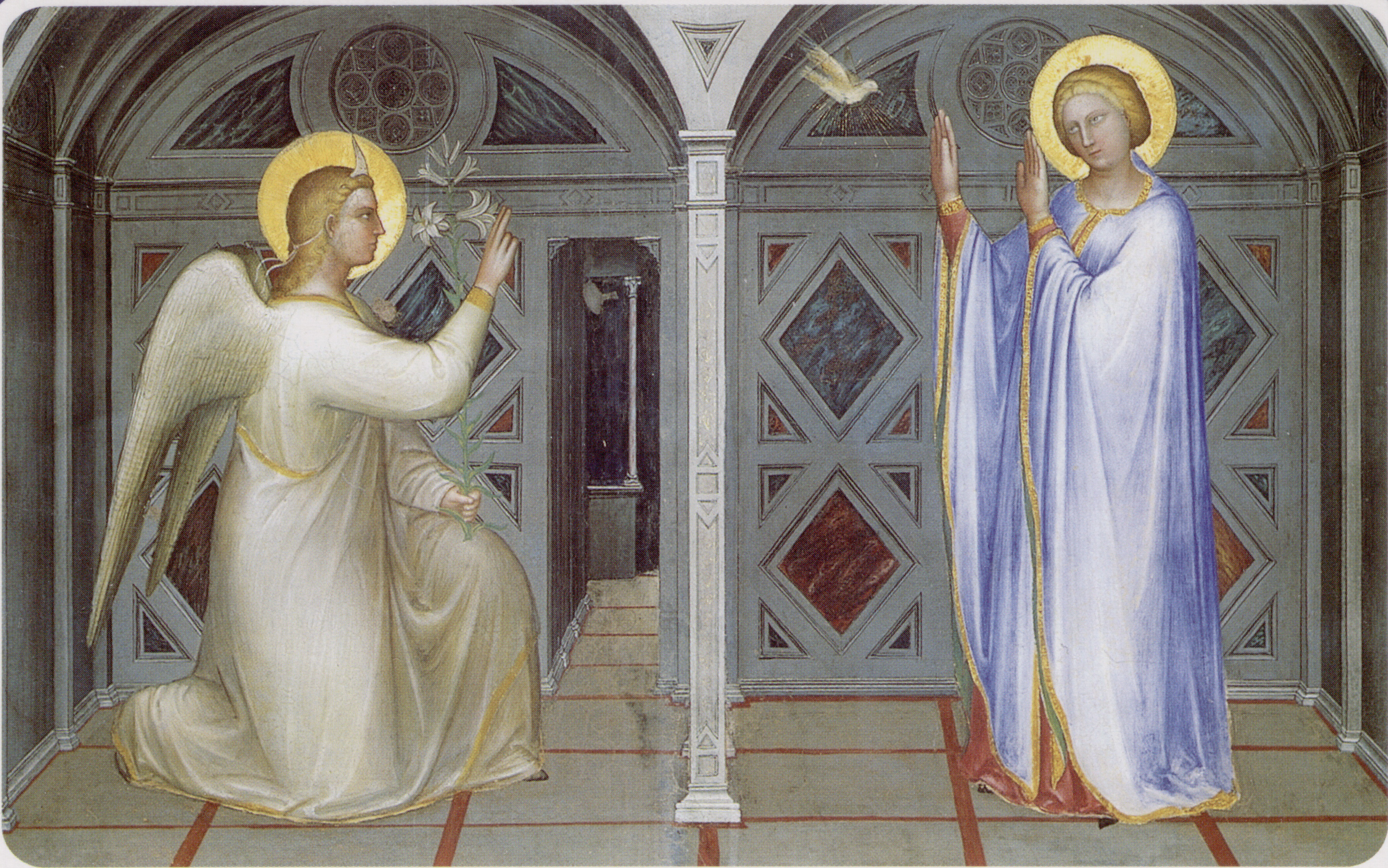
Annunciation

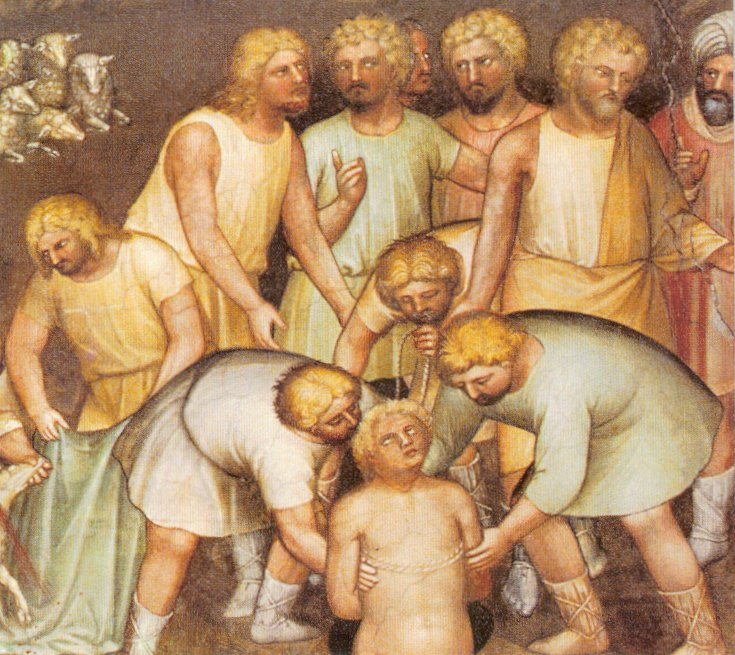
Joseph in the well
