= Stefano da Ferrara =

Italian painter

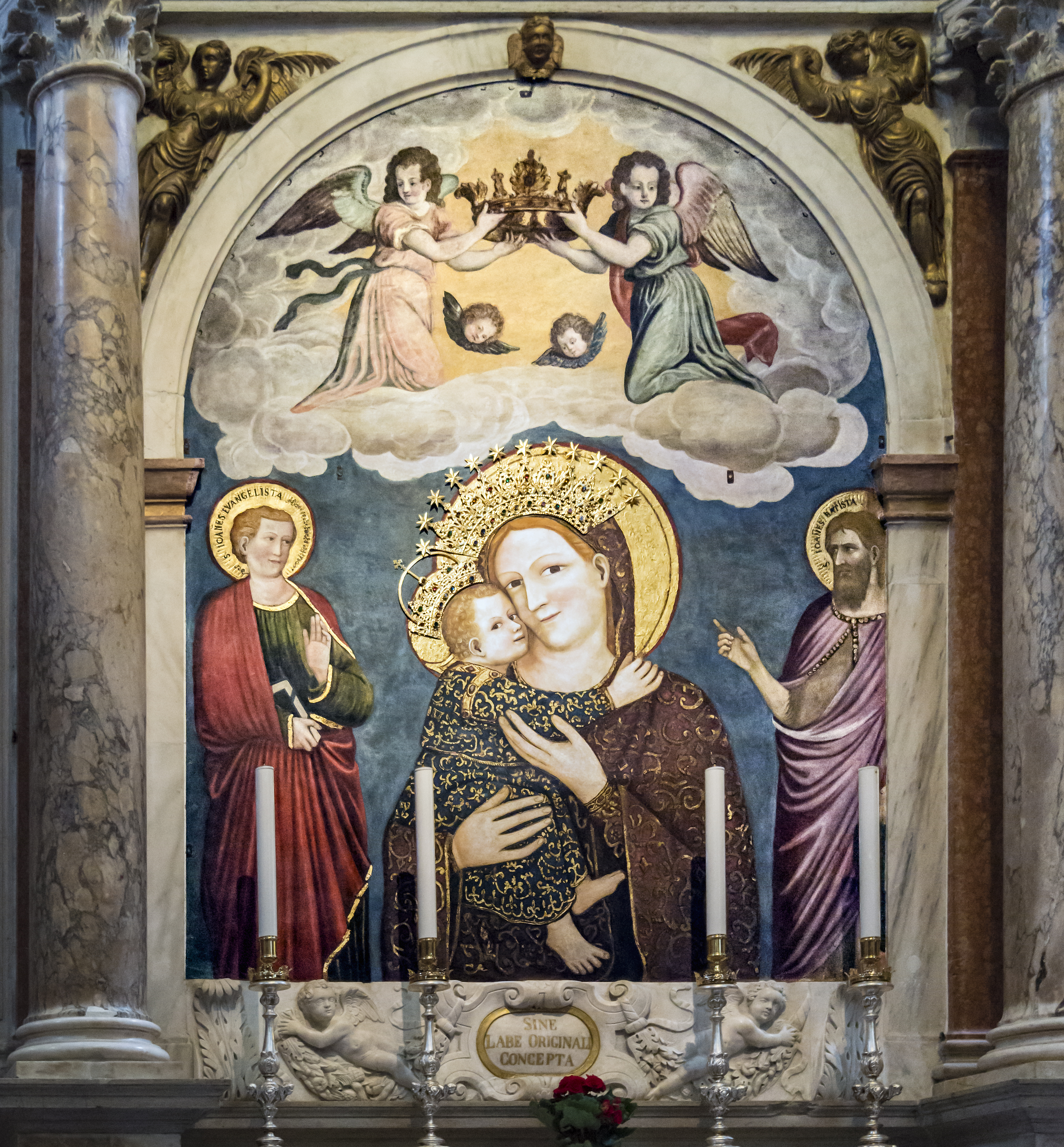
- Madonna del Pilastro, Basilica of Saint Anthony of Padua
- Born: Stefano Di Benedetto; Ferrara
- Known for: Fresco

Stefano da Ferrara was an Italian painter from Ferrara who active in the latter half of the 15th century.

== Biography ==
The dates of his birth and death are uncertain. He traveled to Treviso with his brother around 1339, later moving on to Padua, where his Madonna del Pilastro is located in the Basilica of Saint Anthony of Padua. It is in the style of the Byzantine icons of Eleousa, mother of Mercy. Additional frescoes in the Chapel of the Ark were lost due to neglect and humidity, and destroyed in 1500 during the renovation of the building by Andrea Briosco.

He is described by Vasari as having been the friend of Mantegna. In the Pinacoteca di Brera are two Madonnas with Saints that are assigned to him; in San Giovanni in Monte in Bologna is a Madonna and Child, with two Angels considered to be by this artist. he worked on the frescoes in the Palazzo della Ragione, Padua.

Recent studies have identified Stefano Di Benedetto as Stefano da Ferrara. In these studies, the art historian Miklós Boskovits has plausibly attributed the frescos of casa Minerbi - Del Sale to Stefano di Benedetto da Ferrara (not to be confused with his Quattrocento homonym).
