= Giusto de' Menabuoi =

Italian painter

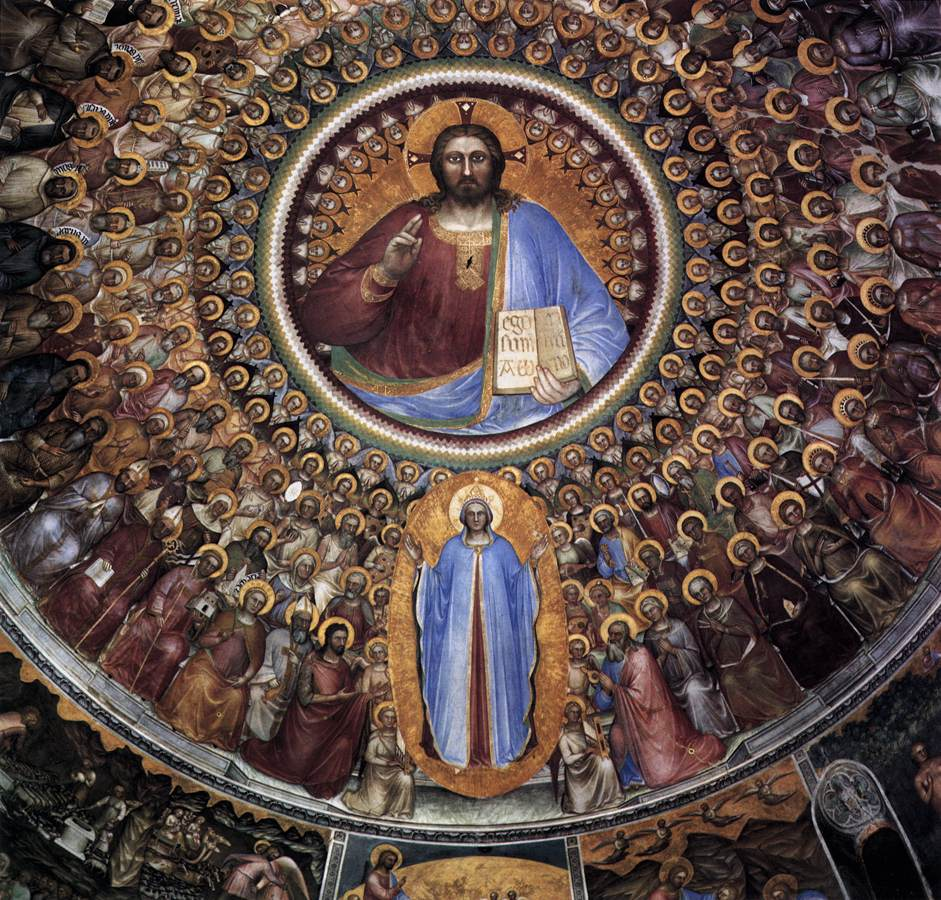
Paradise, Padua Baptistry's frescoed dome, detail (1375–1378)

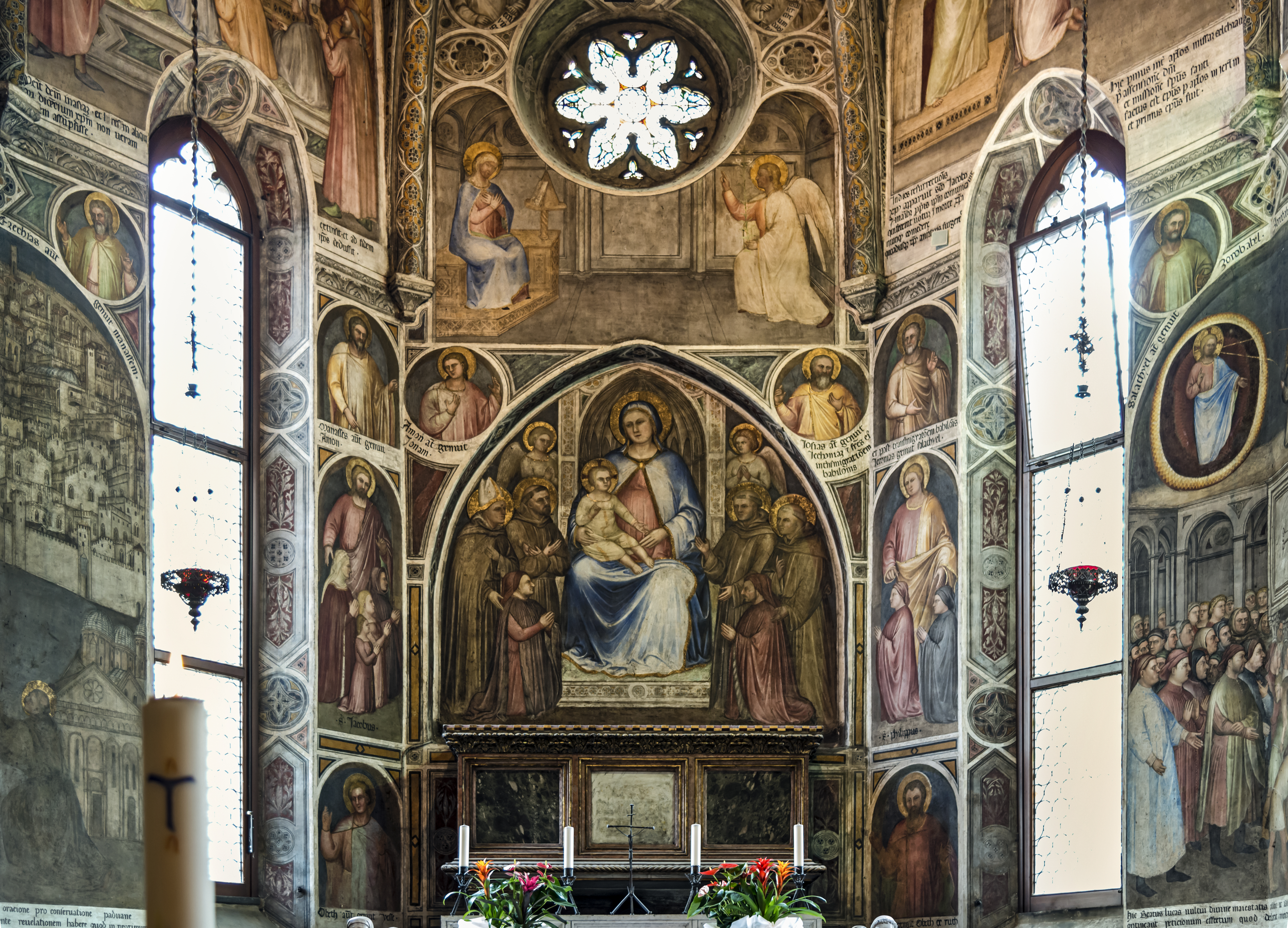
Cappella del beato Luca Belludi Sant'Antonio (Padua)

Giusto de' Menabuoi (c. 1320–1391) was an Italian painter of the early Renaissance. He was born in the Republic of Florence.

He was likely a pupil of Giotto but this is not definitive. De' Menabuoi was known for his use of colour and became a court painter for Da Carrara. His style was individual, with no links to the realism of his contemporaries Altichiero and Jacopo d'Avanzi, and he had no influence on the later development of Venetian painting.

In Lombardy he executed a fresco of the Last Judgement in the Abbey of Viboldone, Milan and some frescoes, now very ruined, preserved inside the porch of the Visconti Castle of Pavia. He then moved to Padua where he completed frescos in the Church of the Eremitani, the Basilica of Saint Anthony of Padua and most notably at the Baptistery of the Padua Duomo.

Between 1375 and 1378 he undertook decoration of the Padua Duomo Baptistery, for Fina Buzzaccarini, wife of Francesco I da Carrara, who planned to use the building as the family mausoleum. Diverging from his earlier work, the frescoes show Romanesque and Byzantine influences, such as in the dome, where a Christ Pantocrator is surrounded by a geometric pattern of angels and saints.

Giusto de' Menabuoi died in Padua and his burial site was re-discovered outside the Baptistry.
