= Martyrdom of Saint Sebastian (disambiguation) =

The Martyrdom of St Sebastian may refer to:

- Saint Sebastian (c. 256–288), early Christian saint and martyr

== Visual arts ==
- The Martyrdom of Saint Sebastian (Leonardo)
- Martyrdom of Saint Sebastian (Perugino)
- Martyrdom of Saint Sebastian (Pollaiuolo)
- Martyrdom of Saint Sebastian (Semitecolo)
- Martyrdom of Saint Sebastian (Signorelli)

== Other depictions ==
- Le Martyre de saint Sébastien, a musical mystery play by Gabriele D'Annunzio, with music by Debussy

== See also ==
- Saint Sebastian Tended by Saint Irene
