= Giorgio Schiavone =

Painter from Dalmatia (1436–1504)

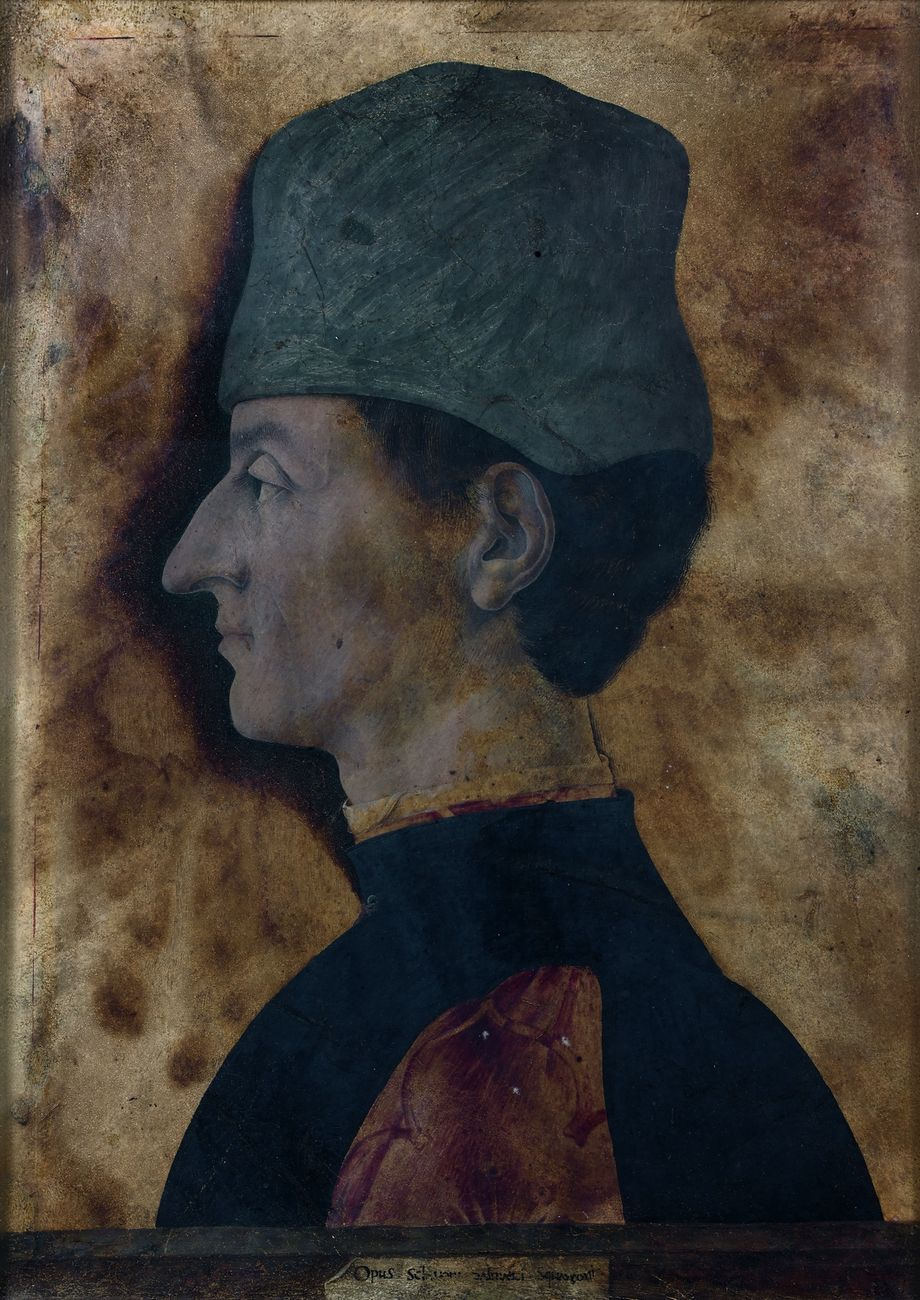
- Giorgio Schiavone, Portrait of a Man, (c. 1460), Musée Jacquemart André – Institut de France
- Born: Juraj Ćulinović; 1433/1436; Scardona, Republic of Venice
- Died: 1504 (age 68-71); Sebenico, Republic of Venice
- Other names: Giorgio di Tomaso Schiavone, Georgius Dalmaticus
- Known for: Madonna and Child (1460)

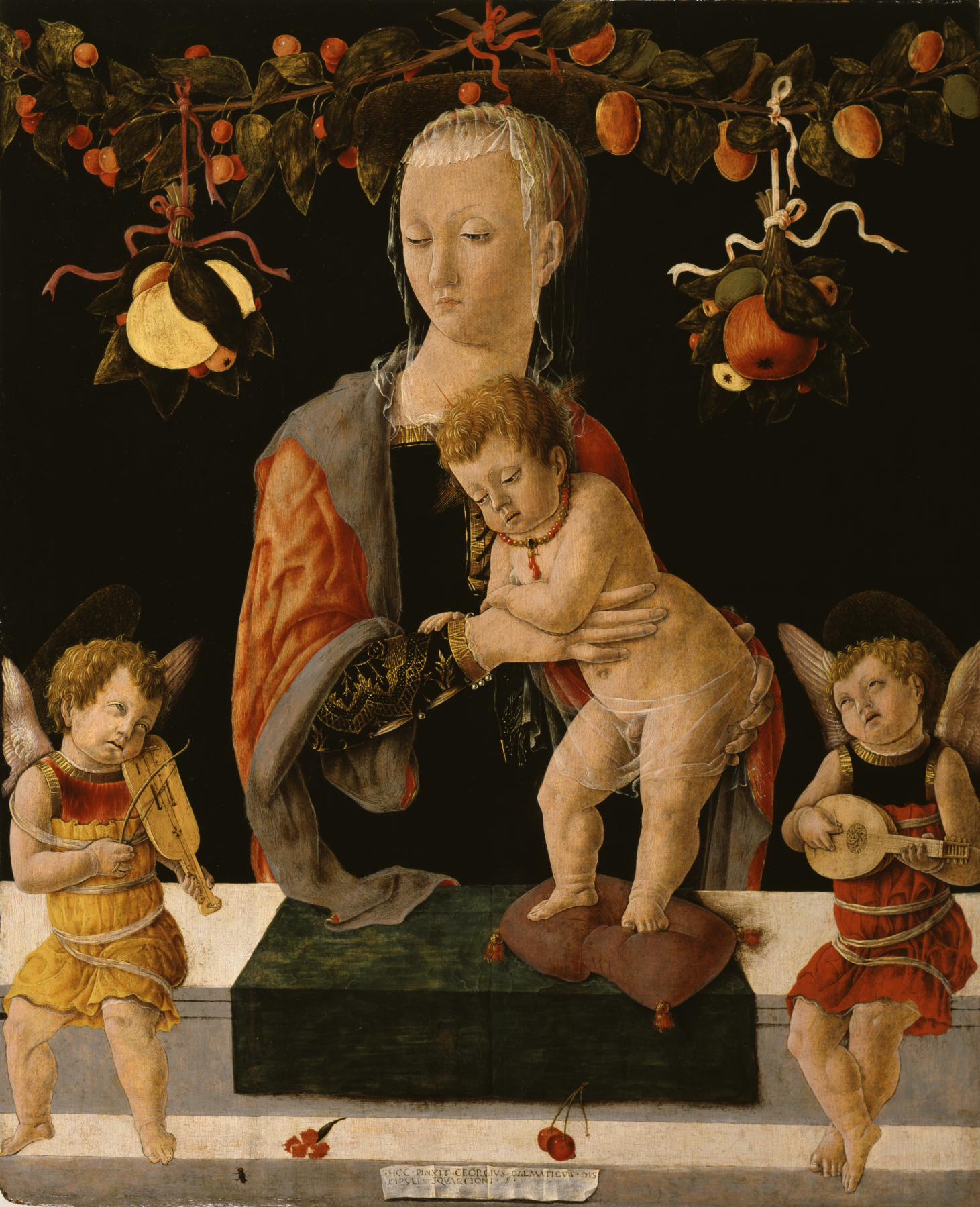
Madonna and Child, c. 1459-1460, oil on panel, Walters Art Museum

Juraj Ćulinović (Italian: Giorgio Schiavone; Latin: Georgius Dalmaticus; 1433/1436 – 6 December 1504) was a Dalmatian Renaissance painter, active in North Italy and Dalmatia. He is considered the most important Dalmatian painter of the 15th century.

== Name ==
While in Italy, he usually signed his name as Sclavonus, or in some cases Georgius Dalmaticus. He is best known today as Giorgio Schiavone or Giorgio di Tomaso Schiavone.

== Biography ==
Born in Skradin, young Juraj probably received his first painting lessons while still in Dalmatia, from Dujam Vušković when that artist was in Šibenik (1448–52) working on a polyptych for the cathedral commissioned by the nobleman Juraj Radoslavčić.

He moved to Italy in 1456, and signed a contract to assist Francesco Squarcione in his Padua studio. After a few years he left Squarcione's workshop, without repaying his debt to the teacher and taking several of his drawings with him. By 1462 he was back in Dalmatia, working in Zadar, then from 1463 he was in Šibenik teaching art, with working visits to Venice and Padua. In 1463 he married Jelena, the daughter of the sculptor and architect Juraj Dalmatinac. It is said that his paintings influenced his father-in-law’s sculpture.

Squarcione was unsuccessful in his attempts to have the money and items returned to him, so in 1467 he brought a lawsuit, nominating Juraj Dalmatinac to represent him. However, by 1474, Squarcione had died, and his son was told that the money and drawings had been given to Marinko Vušković, who had subsequently died having been captured by the Ottomans.

There is very little information concerned with his paintings in Dalmatia. Although contracted to produce works for Šibenik Cathedral, one of the polyptychs mentioned was actually completed by Nicola Braccio from Pisa. On the other hand, there are a great many documents in which he is mentioned with respect to buying land, trading in wine and oil, renting property, selling cheese, wool, wax and gold wire, as well as borrowing money.

He died in Šibenik on 6 December 1504 and is buried in Šibenik Cathedral. Shortly afterwards his wife Jelena died in January 1505. He was survived by two illegitimate children: a son Luka and a daughter Stana.

== Works ==
Giorgio Schiavone is an important representative of the Paduan school. While working for Squarcione in Padua, he produced works such as Madonna and Child. His paintings of the time show the influence of Donatello and Andrea Mantegna, and he may in turn have inspired the young Carlo Crivelli. He had a very successful career in Padua, where he produced his best-known work

Five of his works were signed:

- polyptych from the church of St. Nicholas in Padua (now in the National Gallery, London)
- polyptych from the church of St. Francis of Padua (middle section is in the Bode Museum, Berlin; the two side panels in the Padua Cathedral)
- Blessed Virgin Mary with Child (Walters Art Museum, Baltimore)
- Portrait of a Man (Musée Jacquemart-André, Paris).
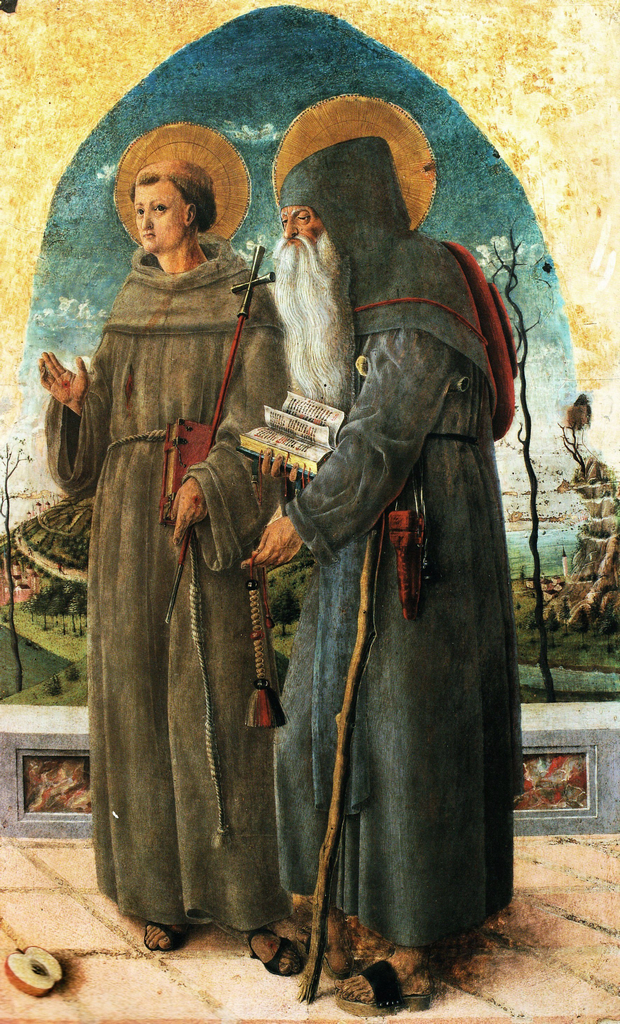
San Francesco e San Gerolamo, Diocesan museum of Padua

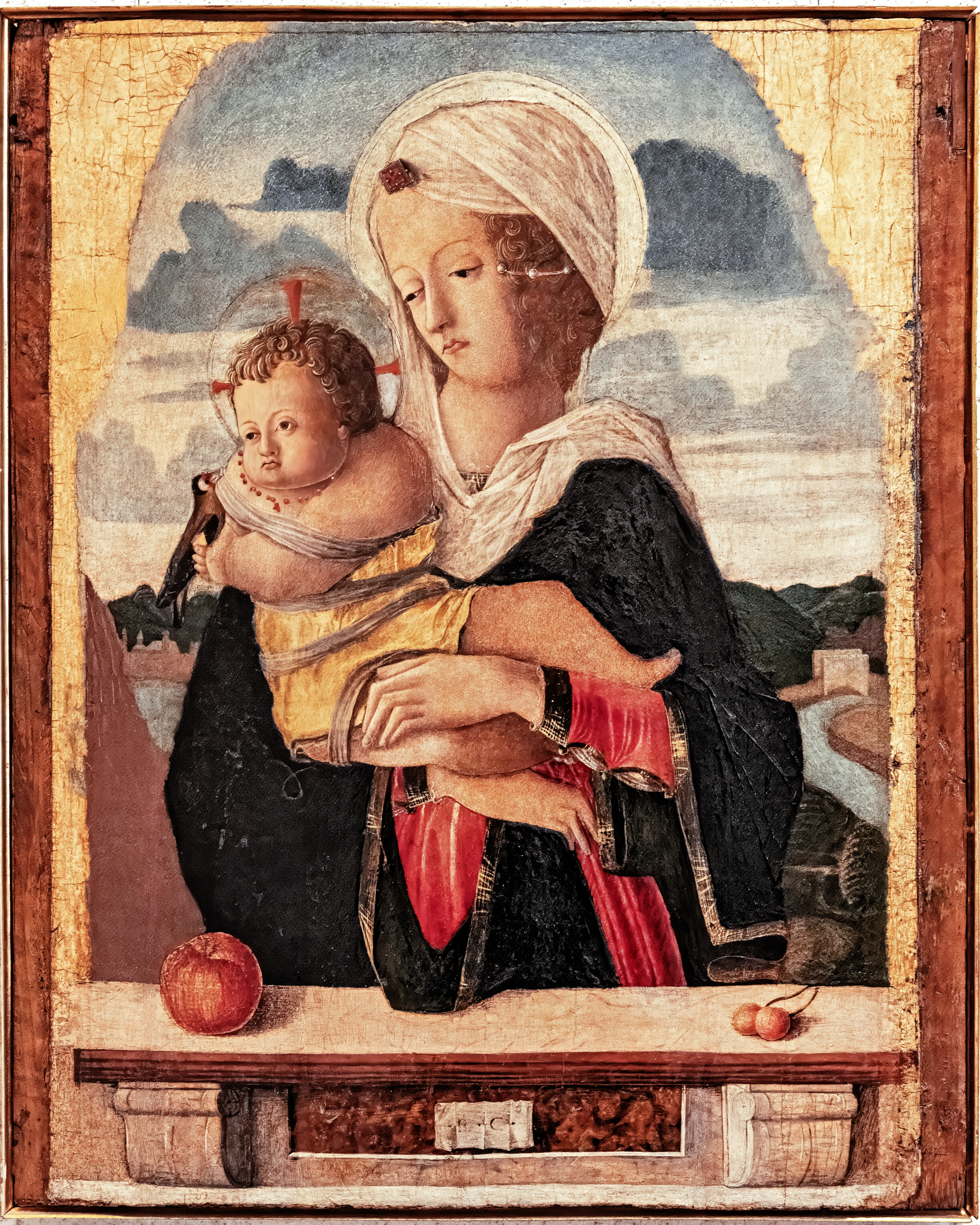
Madonna with baby Jesus (c.1450-1490 ), Museo Correr

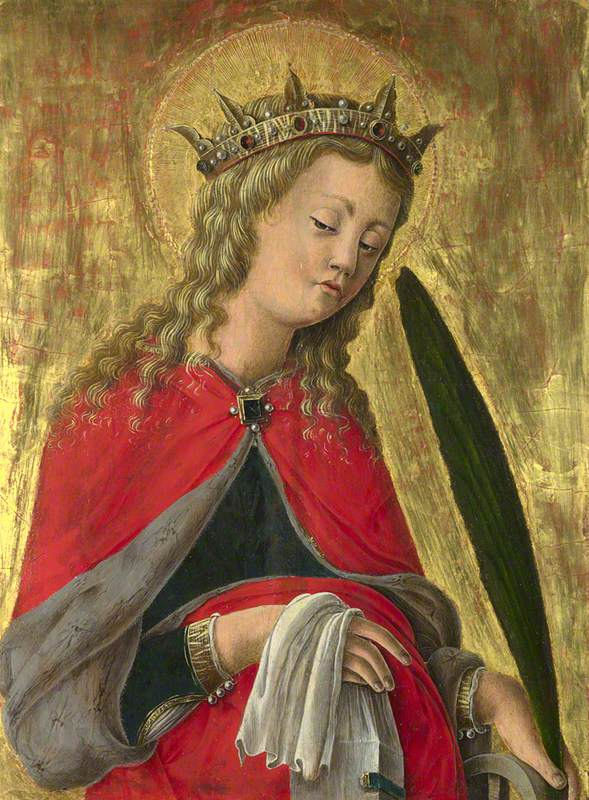
Saint Catherine, National Gallery

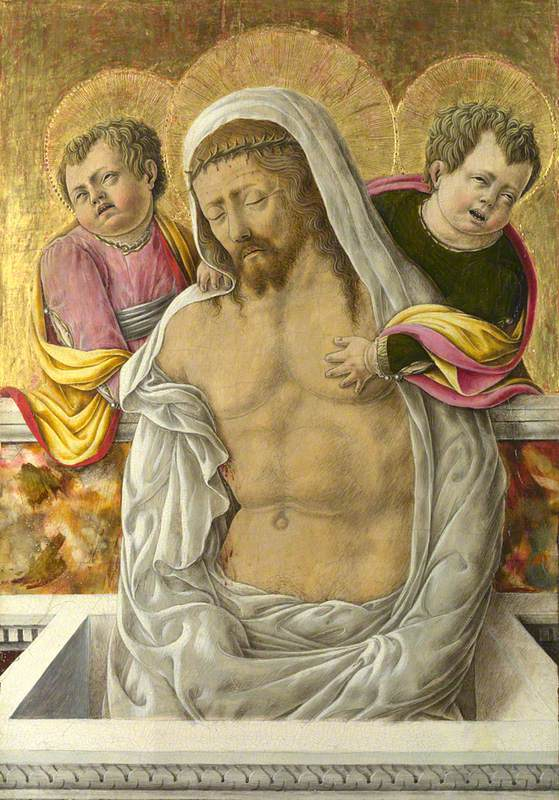
Pieta, c. 1456-1461 National Gallery

== See also ==
- Giorgio da Sebenico
- Lovro Dobričević
- Mihajlo Hamzić
- Nikola Božidarević
- Vitus of Kotor, the architect of Visoki Dečani
