= Limousin workshop evangeliarium book cover =

- Diocesan museum of Padua, Italy
- Also known as: Limoges or Limousin Book Cover, Evangeliary Cover or Gospel Cover
- Type: book cover
- Date: ca. 1230
- Place of origin: Limoges (France)
- Compiled by: Limousin workshop, Venetian workshop (frame)
- Material: Champlevé enamels, copper, silver, olive wood
- Size: 32.2 cm x 19.5 cm
- Previously kept: Sacred Treasury of the Collegiate Church of Santa Giustina in Monselice (Italy)

Limousin workshop evangeliarium book cover is a 13th century evangeliary cover made of embossed copper and decorated in champlevé Limousin enamels with gilt figures in bas-relief fixed to a substituted olive wood tablet. The cover is surrounded by a silver frame with watermark meanders and rosettes and has the measurements of about 32.2x19.5 cm. The object is preserved and put on display at the Diocesan Museum in Padua (Italy) as a part of its collection.

== Description ==
At the center of the cover, Christ in Majesty with a cruciform nimbus sits on a copper cushion engraved with stylized floral motifs. His feet are resting on a stool. The figure of Christ is fixed to the cover with two nails, flanked by the representative symbols of Alpha and Omega.

The book cover shows many similarities with Romanesque modules. This artistic manifestation is characterized as being very symbolic and didactic at the same time, which is usually explained by the presence of a vast majority of illiterate people. A transfigured world appears in the visual and figurative representations in order to depict what is divine. Reality and nature are idealized portrayals.

The Pantocrator is surrounded by the symbols of the Four Evangelists. This is a very common theme in Romanesque representations mainly due to the propagation of the iconography from the Beatus of Liébana. The figure of Christ sits in a blessing position, keeping up three fingers with his right hand and holding the Sacred Scriptures in his left. The circular nimbus, an element which stems from Greek artists, represents his divinity. Heavily inspired by the Byzantine Pantocrator, he is seated on a throne inside a mandorla held by the Four Evangelists’ symbols. The mandorla functions as a portal to the divine realm of Heaven. The crown on his head represents his royal nature. The Four Evangelists’ symbols, also known as Tetramorph, would have come from a vision of Saint John according to the Book of Ezekiel. In some cases, they can also have nimbuses and wings while they hold their own Evangeliaries. This kind of iconography is also typical for representations of the Final Judgement and the Apocalypse.

“In the Christian tradition, each of the four animals symbolizes a key stage in the story of Christ: the man symbolizes the Incarnation of Jesus; the ox, the sacrificial animal par excellence, the Crucifixion; the lion, whose young open their eyes three days after birth, symbolizes the Resurrection; and the eagle, soaring into the sky, the Ascension.”

The winged man (top left corner) corresponds to Saint Matthew, whose Evangeliary starts with Jesus’ human genealogy. The eagle (top right corner) symbolizes Saint John, who, similarly to the animal, has a profound spirituality, mystic contemplation and deep vision that makes him closer to God. The ox (bottom right) is related to Saint Luke as his Evangeliary starts with a sacrifice in the Temple. Finally, Saint Mark is identified as the lion (bottom left), because his Evangeliary opens with Saint John Baptist’s preaching, being the lion in the desert.

The background and decorations are filled with blue, red, green and yellow enamels. These champlevé enamels are obtained by hollowing out figures on the copper plate and preparing in it all the spaces destined to receive pulverized vitreous enamel.

What is described as an “Oriental” or “Persian” character of the decorations stems from the Carolingian era as the enamellers would have used Sassanid works as models. These elements were often repeated in Limousin enamels, even in much later periods, such as the enamels from the 12th and 13th centuries. Given the partial continuity of these styles and forms, these “Oriental” Carolingian influences have come to be traditional for Limousin Enamels.

== History ==
=== Dating ===
In 1920, Andrea Moschetti noted certain affinities with the Louvre Gospel Book Cover, which can be dated back to the 13th century. However, because of a stylistic analysis comparing the cover to the reliquary case of San Calmin in Mozac, France, it made more sense to date the object back to around 1197. He also established the frame was a later contribution by Venetian Goldsmiths, making the frame a more recent addition. Then, in 1994, Gaetano Cozzi resumed the comparisons already established by Moschetti centering the datation to around the last three decades of the 12th century. He compared the cover stylistically and chronologically with different objects, like for example the former Spitzer binding (Museum of Cluny).

Despite these pre-13th-century references, Enrica Cozzi preferred to postpone the date to one already within the 13th century, specifically to around 1230. Marie-Madeleine Gauthier in fact underlined, for some time, that the enameled decorations in the background found a wide diffusion in the Limousin enamel starting from the beginning of the 13th century.

=== Provenance ===
The object is currently kept and put on display at the Diocesan Museum in Padua. It originally came from the Collegiate Church of Santa Giustina in Monselice where it was a part of its Sacred Treasury.

Emanuela Rango was able to reconstruct the mobility of the object through the analysis of indirect sources like reports from visiting clergymen from the end of the 15th century up to the end of the 20th century for her thesis on the Sacred Treasury as there seems to exist no further historical documentation on the Collegiate Church. Finally, in 1925, the book cover was first mentioned by Monsignor Elia Dalla Costa describing it as “a Peace bearing above a large enamel, the seated Redeemer surrounded by the symbols of the Evangelists”. Then, in 1942, it was mentioned again. This time by Monsignor Carlo Agostini who included “a Byzantine Peace of great value” in his report. Then, the Sacred Treasury was moved from the Old Cathedral to the New Cathedral in Monselice, where it was kept from 1957 onwards.

== Commission theories ==
=== First theory ===
The first theory is one that relates the object to the figure of Simone Paltanieri in an assumption that it constituted his personal testamentary gift. Paltanieri, who was born in Monselice, is the most representative figure within the local church in the first half of the 13th century. The hypothesis of a donation by Simone Paltanieri finds documentary justification in his last will of 1275, which destined his silver belongings to the church of San Matteo in Vanzo, a church dependent on Santa Giustina di Monselice, as part of a substantial bequest to the parish church of Monselice and other churches in the region.

Considering his important relations with the papal court and the imperial world of the 13th century this theory of the donation and entrustment to the church of his native city is certainly very plausible. However, it could also be a personal commission for the exercise of his functions, making the object a symbol of superior class in terms of culture and importance since Limosian enameled objects were given a high value in 13th-century Italy.

=== Second theory ===
The second theory entails the figure of Holy Roman Emperor Frederick II of the Hohenstaufen Dynasty. The Holy Roman Empire reached a peak in the middle of the 13th century, but this overextension also led to its partial collapse. Taking this into account, as well as the dating of the object to around the 1230s, this second theory is made plausible by the context of Frederick II’s war for Lombardy and Italy, trying to suppress rebel cities, explaining his presence in the region. The theory holds that therefore the cover could also be a gift from the emperor who was apparently known for his refined love for Limousin enamels as has been highlighted in recent studies.
