= Pietro Calzetta =

Italian painter

Pietro Calzetta (fl. 1470–1500) was an Italian painter of the Renaissance. He was son-in-law of Montagnana and a pupil of Squarcione. He painted in the chapel of Corpus Christi at the Basilica of Saint Anthony of Padua. In 1470, he restored some works of Stefano da Ferrara, and in the same year he contracted to work with Jacopo Montagnana and Matteo del Pozzo at the decorations of the Cappella Gattamelata in the Basilica of Saint Anthony of Padua. Up till the year 1500, he was still employed in that church, where he also painted an Ecce Homo for another of the chapels.
