= Diocesan museum of Padua, Italy =

Coordinates: 45.4069039°N 11.8722693°E

Diocesan museum of Padua
- Established: 2000
- Location: Palazzo Vescovile - piazza del Duomo 12
- Type: Art, architecture, religion, Catholic
- Website: http://www.museodiocesanopadova.it

The Diocesan museum of Padua displays arts and artifacts belonging to the Roman Catholic Diocese of Padua; it is housed in the 15th-century former bishop's residence or Palazzo Vescovile. The building, adjacent to the Cathedral of Padua, faces the Piazza del Duomo, can in the historic center of Padua, region of Veneto, Italy.

Many of the works in the museum derive from the cathedral or from other diocesan churches, some suppressed and no longer extant. The collections date from the 9th to the 19th centuries. They are displayed on two separate floors and are ordered chronologically and by type.

== Hall of San Gregorio Barbarigo ==
This room the first floor, chiefly for use by scholars due to the presence of the chapter library and the diocesan archives, is a room named for St Gregory Barbarigo, bishop of Padua (1664 - 1697), which contains several accounts of the diocese's library and of the cathedral's scriptorium. Of special interest are documents pertaining to the renaissance library of bishops Iaocopo Zeno and Pietro Barozzi (bishop from 1487 to 1507), and which include 14th-century illuminated manuscripts, 15th-century incunabula, and pre-16th-century books. The actual diocesan museum is found on the second floor of the building.

== Salon of the bishops and Capella di Santa Maria degli Angeli ==
These rooms and the palace chapel display

- Portraits of Padua's bishops frescoed in the 16th-century on the walls by Bartolomeo Montagnana but refurbished and completed in the subsequent centuries. Represented here are the first one hundred bishops of Padua, beginning with San Prosdocimo and arriving at Pietro Barozzi, who commissioned the work.
- Fresco with a portrait Francesco Petrarca, removed from the poet's house in Padua
- Madonna with Child- mid-15th century mosaic detached from the demolished (1810) church of St Job (San Giobbe).

Throughout the 19th and 20th centuries this room slowly deteriorated, and was returned to its original splendor with its latest restoration in 2006.

On the north-east side of the salon is the entrance to the chapel of Santa Maria degli Angeli, commissioned by bishop Pietro Barozzi and built in 1495 by architect Lorenzo da Bologna. The frescos by Prospero da Piazzola and Jacopo da Montagnana follow an iconographic program centered on the Apostles' Creed. On the main altar is found:

- Triptych by Jacopo da Montagnana depicting the Annunciation, St. Michael the archangel and St. Rafael the archangel.

== Treasures of the cathedral ==
The oldest liturgical items are found in the Treasure of the cathedral and include:

- a silver inkwell (9th century) that was later transformed into a chrismarium;
- a formella with Jesus giving a blessing (11th century), made of soapstone;
- a processional cross (1228);
- the cover of an evangelario (13th century), from the church of Santa Giustina (Monselice).

== Belvedere rooms ==
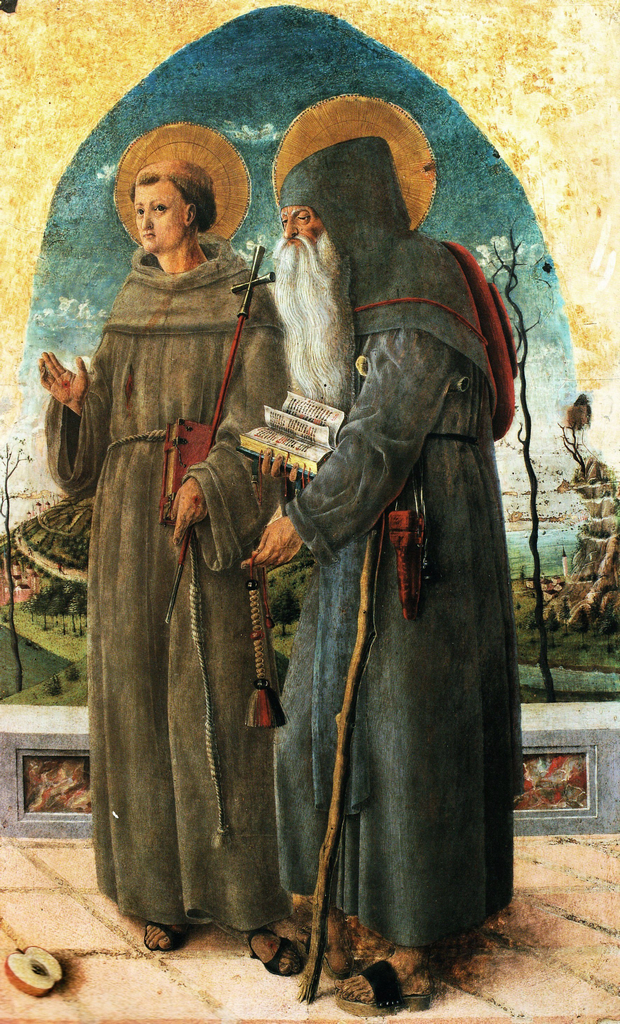
Giorgio Schiavone - St. Francis of Assisi and St. Jerome

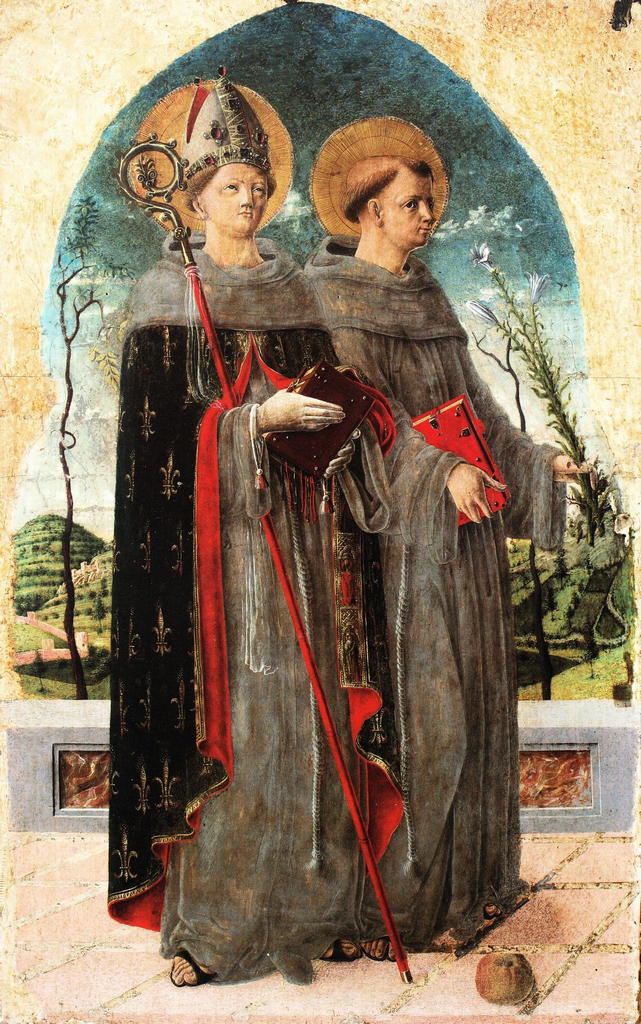
Giorgio Schiavone - St. Louis of Toulouse and St. Anthony of Padua

These rooms exhibits works of art from the 14th to the 15th centuries, the most important of which are:

- Cycle of seven paintings with the story of Saint Sebastian (1367) di Niccolò Semitecolo;
- Madonna with the baby Jesus (14th century) by Paolo Veneziano;
- Madonna with the baby Jesus (late 14th century) by Giusto de' Menabuoi;
- Portrait of a child, a fresco removed from an outside wall of the Baptistry;
- paintings (middle of the 15th century) by Giorgio Schiavone, originally forming a polyptych with figures of Franciscan saints for the Church of St. Francis the Greater (Padua);
- the reliquary of the cross (1435–1453) in gold-plated silver, made in Denmark
- Reliquary of Saint Daniel

In addition there are works from the 17th to the 18th centuries:

- sculptures of Bonazza;
- St. Francis da Paola, oil on canvas, by Giambattista Tiepolo;
- paintings by Giandomenico Tiepolo;
- metal work by Angelo Scarabello.

== 19th century collections ==
In this room, next to works of great historic-artistic value, are displayed a large number of ex votos, objects associated with popular devotion.

== Collection of liturgical items ==
This section contains a rich assortment or liturgical items, of particular interest are:

- two dalmatics with maniple and stole (late 15th century)
- a corredo embroidered with gold thread and a papal coat of arms, donated to the cathedral by Pope Clement XIII, bishop of Padua (1743–1758).

== Bibliography ==
- Giacomini Miari Erminia, Mariani Paola, Musei religiosi in Italia, Milano 2005, p. 306
- Zuffi Stefano, I Musei Diocesani in Italia. Primo volume, Palazzolo sull'Oglio (BS) 2003, pp. 64 – 67

== See also ==
- Diocesi di Padova
- Duomo di Padova
