= Prospero da Piazzola =

Italian painter

Prospero da Piazzola (documented from 1472 - 1521) was an Italian painter active in Padua.

Few documented works remain of this painter. He was active in the fresco decoration of the Capella Santa Maria degli Angeli, in the Palazzo Vescovile of Padua, erected in 1495, and frescoed by Piazzola and Jacopo Parisati.
