= San Nicolò, Padua =

Roman Catholic church in Padua

Coordinates: 45°24′31″N 11°52′21″E

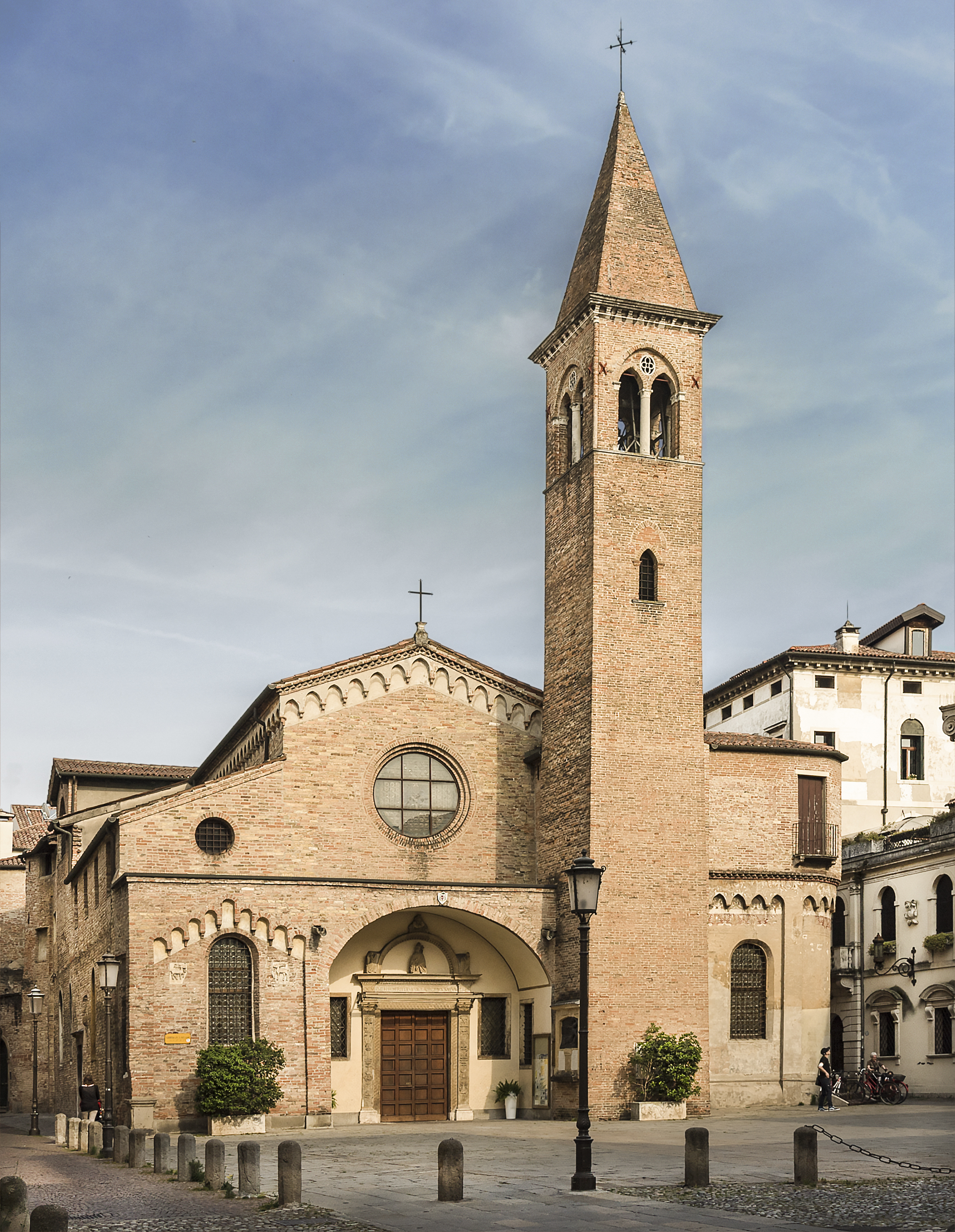
Facade and bell-tower

San Nicolò is a Romanesque and Gothic-style, Roman Catholic church in Padua, region of Veneto, Italy. It stands in front of a homonymous piazza, and is adjacent to the Palazzo Meschini and Palazzo Brunelli-Bonetti.

== History ==
The church was first documented to the 11th century, when it was consigned to monks of the order of St Peter (Monache di San Pietro). It is dedicated to San Nicholas of Myra, and apparently later acquired some relics of the saint. In a document from 1178, bishop Gerardo recalls it among the parishes of Padua. It underwent substantial refurbishment in the early 14th-century. By 1546, the church was known to have 11 altars, many owned by local neighborhood aristocratic families, including the Forzatè. Further refurbishments occurred in the 17th and 18th-centuries. The bell-tower was rebuilt in the 19th-century in a gothic-style. The latest restoration (1966-1971) stripped much of the baroque interior decoration.

The interior houses a main altarpiece depicting the Holy Family with the Saint Francesca Romana and Eurosia (1777) by Giovanni Domenico Tiepolo; it was moved to this location in 1966. The apse has traces of 15th century frescoes attributed to Giovanni da Pisa. In the Altar of the Holy Sacrament is a depiction San Liberale attributed to Jacopo Parisati. Two frescoes depicting a Crucifixion and the Life of John the Baptist are attributed to Gerardino da Reggio, and were commissioned in 1374 by Marco Forzatè. The chapel of the baptistry is also linked to the Forzatè family and has a triptych from the 14th century. The church once had a Crucifixion altarpiece by Andrea Schiavone but it was moved to the Palace of Count Frigimelica, later owned by Count Salvatica.Among art pieces in the church of San Nicolò one series is of particular interest: four wooden bas-reliefs that represent the deeds of Christian saints (St. Bernardine Healing a King, Stigmatization of St. Francis, St. John the Baptist Preaching, and Bilocation of St. Anthony of Padua) .
