= Reliquary of Saint Daniel =

Liturgical object from the Cathedral Church of Padua

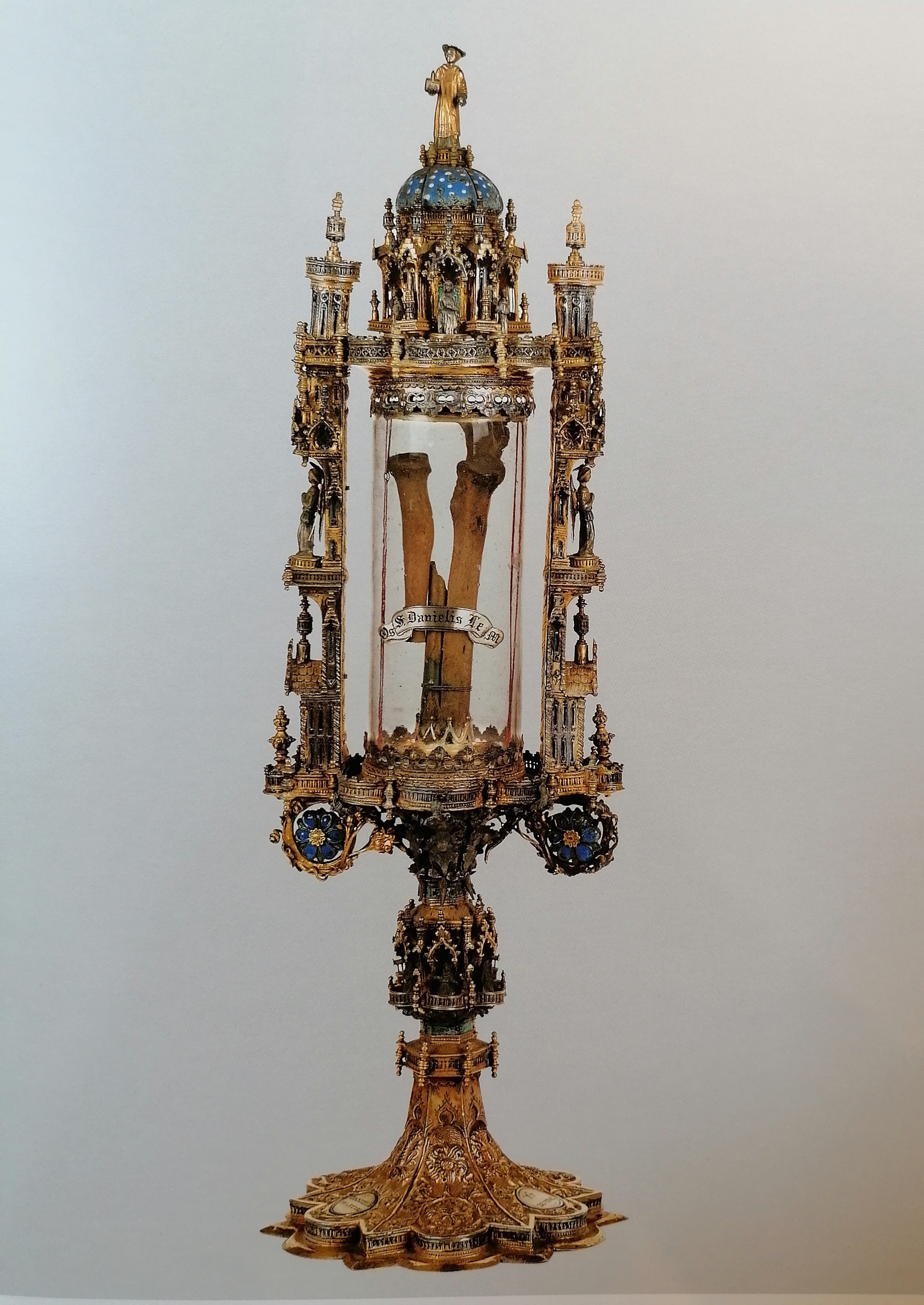
- Artist: Bartolomeo da Bologna, Antonino di Giovanni, Francesco di Comino
- Year: ante 1472
- Medium: silver (gilded, embossed, perforated, engraved); enamell
- Dimensions: 55 x 17.5 cm
- Location: Diocesan Museum, Padua

The Reliquary of Saint Daniel is a liturgical object that comes from the Cathedral Church of Padua. This object was created by Bartolomeo da Bologna, Antonio di Giovanni and Francesco di Comino before 1472. It is now preserved in the Diocesan Museum in Padua, as part of its collection. The reliquary displays the relics of Saint Daniel, a 4th century Paduan martyr whose body is preserved in the Cathedral Church of the city.

== History ==
In the cathedral's inventory from 1405 is described a reliquary “Item unum tabernaculum cum cruce superius de argento deaurato in quo sunt reliquie sancti Danielis prophete cum tribus smaltis a plaustris et mitra, ponderi”. The object was donated to the cathedral before 1405 by Stefano da Carrara, Bishop of the city.

The reliquary than appears in an inventory from 1472 which describes the object as “Item unum tabernaculum de argento deaurato de novo factum et fecit fieri fratalea sancti Daniellis et habet in sumitate imaginem sancti Daniellis cum duobus pilleriis et in pede tribus smalti laboratis de aniello cum litteris et image sancti Daniellis”. The object might have been re-shaped under the request of the confraternity of Saint Daniel before 1472, giving the reliquary a new structure.

In the inventory from 1491 it is added that “[…] et litteris dicendibus QUESTO TABERNACULO HE DE LA FRAGLIA DE SANCTO DANIELE”.

The confraternity of Saint Daniel was founded in Padua around 1295, although its active presence in the city became stronger during the 15th century. The prime objective of the confraternity was to spread the cult of the martyr; to do so, every third Saturday of the month the fraglia gathered to celebrate mass around the cathedral's altar which contained the saint's body. Furthermore, on the 3rd of January and the third Sunday of May, the confraternity used to organize a solemn procession in his horon. As for this last ceremony, it was a rite that involved the whole citizenry.

=== The cult of Saint Daniel ===
The body of Saint Daniel was initially buried in the Basilica of Santa Giustina. In 1075, following the request of Bishop Odelrico, it was exhumed and translated inside the Cathedral church. On the 3rd of January 1076 the body was finally placed inside an altar in the west side of the church. The Saint's body was later relocated, both in 1295 and in 1592 finding its final placement inside the Cathedral's crypt.

There are two main narratives regarding the life of Saint Daniel, the Passio sancti Danielis martiris et levite (XI–XII century) and the Inventio corporis sancti Danielis martiri ac levite Christi (XII century). Daniel was a deacon and an evangelist who died as a martyr after being imprisoned by pagan authorities. According to the passio, Saint Daniel appeared in a dream to a blind man and told him to go on a pilgrimage to visit his forgotten and hidden tomb in Padua. As a reward for his commitment, the Saint cured the blindness that affected the old man. Following the miracle bishop Odelrico allegedly ordered the translation of the Saint's body inside the Cathedral. Saint Daniel later became one of the patron saints of Padua.

Padua's cathedral had a history of being home to a large collection of relics and reliquaries, which is an element that reflects the wealth of the cathedral and its patrons. It is known that during the celebration of the Mass or other festive liturgies, relics were often moved within the cathedral space. Moreover, on some occasions relics were taken out of the cathedral to be involved in solemn processions; one of the most relevant relic-related rituals took place during the feast of the Ascension: the bishop, the clergy and the lay populations processed around the city carrying unspecified relics from church to church.

== Description ==
The base of the object is formed by six lobes, embossed with floral motifs. These decorative motifsare similar to those used on the reliquaries produced by Bartolomeo da Bologna and his collaborators, during the same period for the Basilica of Saint Anthony (Padua).

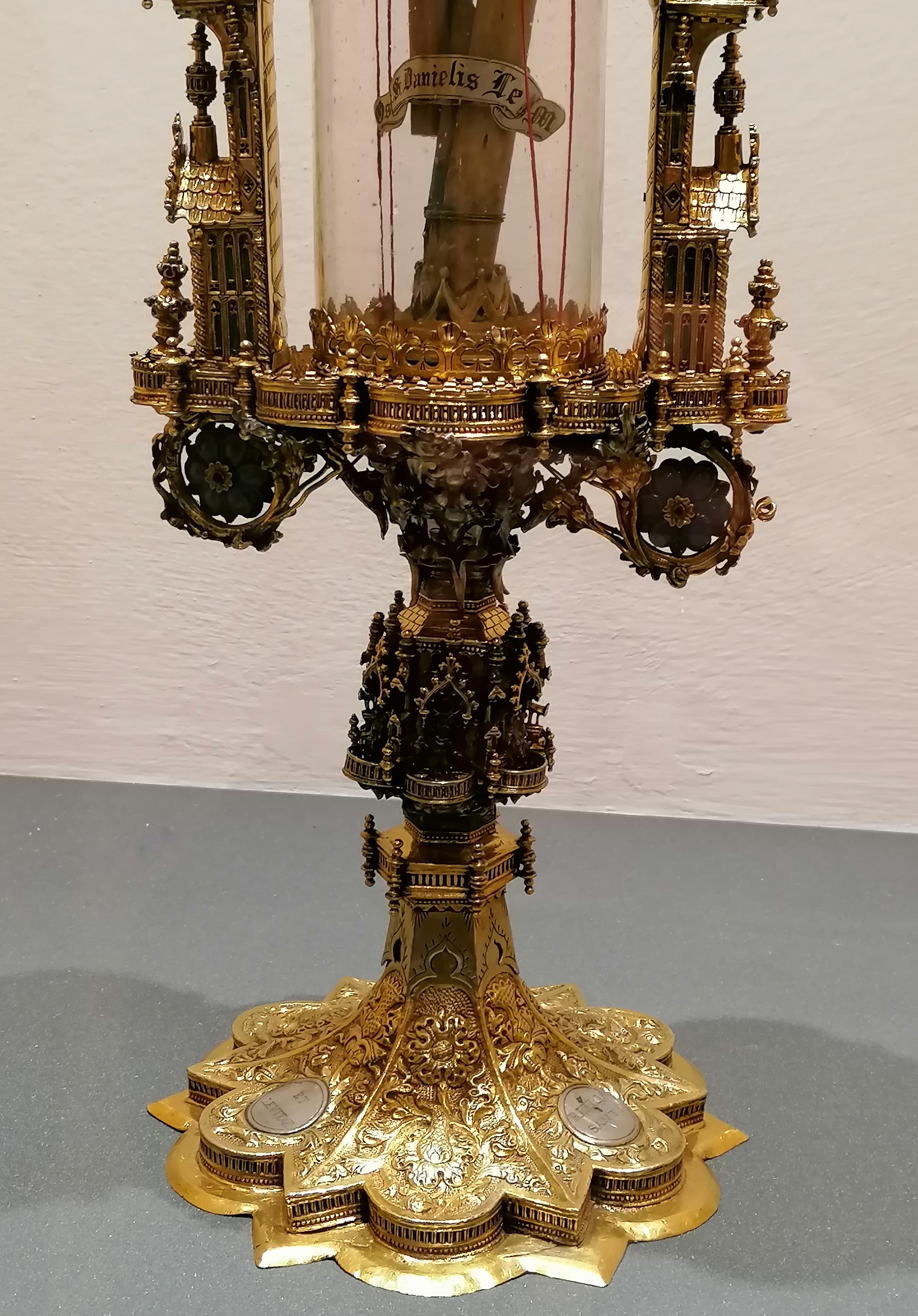
Reliquary of Saint Daniel, detail, lower section

In the lower section of the reliquary, a hexagon shaped knot hosts six figures inside niches. The upper section of the object consists in a crystal cylinder displaying the body relics of Saint Daniel (supposedly parts of his arm, the radius and the ulna). This part of the reliquary is framed on the sides by a complex gothic architectural structure: two pilasters are surmounted by small towers, carved with niches and decorated by praying angels. The upper level of the artwork is closed by an enamelled blue dome, crowned by a figure of Saint Daniel holding the city of Padua (his common iconography). Under the dome, a few niches host the statues of some saints. Two enamelled blue flowers delimit the object on its lower side.

The 15th century Paduan reliquaries usually present a sumptuous and rich amplification of the architectural elements that make up the node. Equally precious is the floral decoration. The blooming branch is a distinctive decorative element that can be identified as a stylistic and formal feature of Paduan goldsmithing.

In 2002 the object was completely restored. At the time it was discovered that the blue enameled plaques placed on the pillars, on the drum and on the knot, are not original, as they were probably produced and added during the 19th century. These are not the only non-original sections of the reliquary: the light blue enamel that covers the dome and the three plaques with the inscriptions were also added at a later date.

Iconography

Among the six figures placed on the hexagonal node it is possible to recognize a Virgin with Child and a Franciscan Saint, most likely Saint Francis. Inside the niches placed under the dome, the figures of Bernardino of Siena and a female figure find their place. Although not all the saints have been recognized, the may be the patrons of Padua: Saint Anthony, Saint Justina and Saint Prosdocimus.

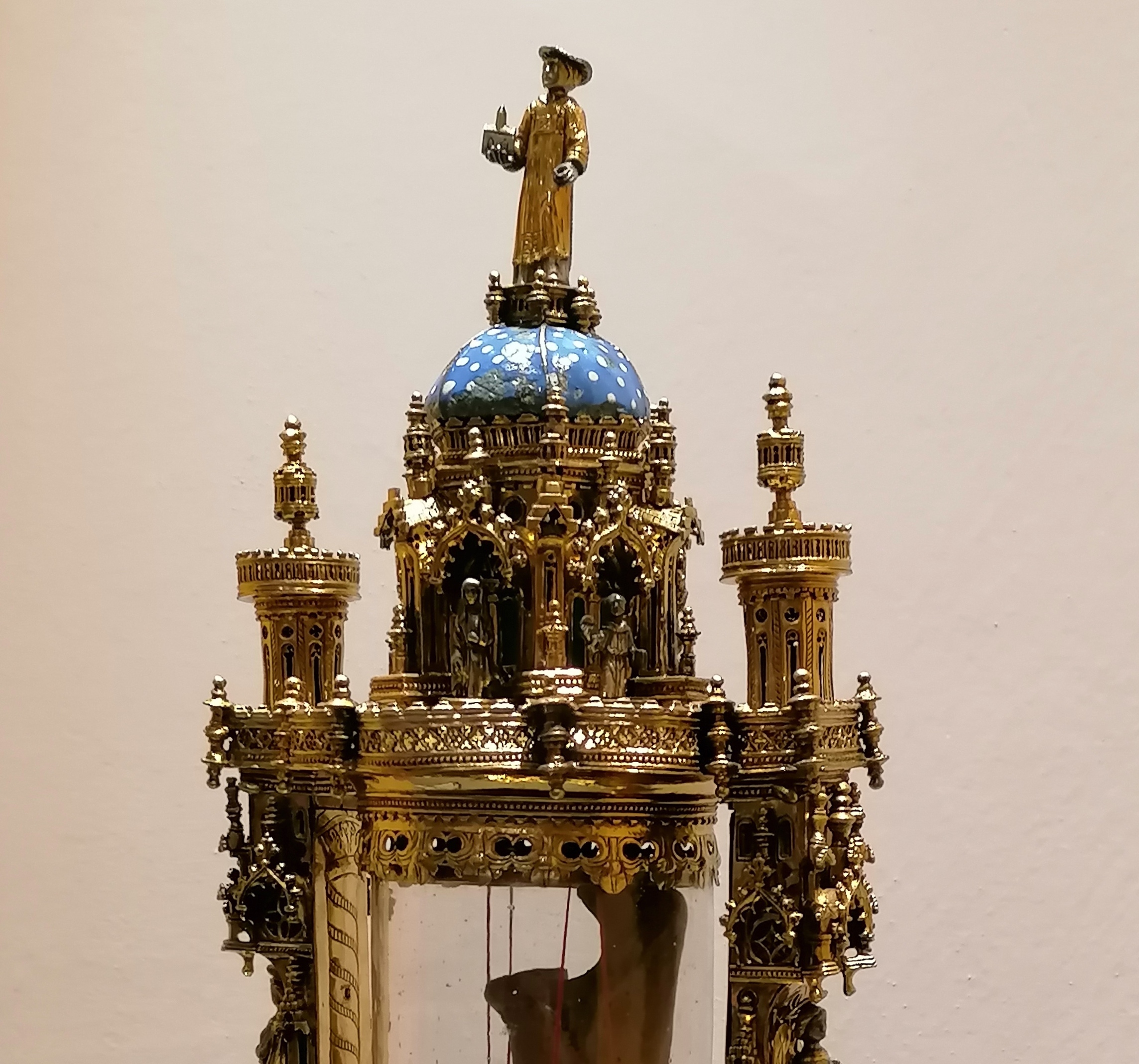
Reliquary of Saint Daniel, detail, upper section

On the base of the reliquary are placed three plaques, which read: RELIQUIA SANCTI DANIELIS MARTIRIS ET LEVITAE.

== Liturgical use ==
As an object of devotion, the reliquary might have been involved in the liturgies that the confraternity used to celebrate. It might have had a role during the monthly mass dedicated to St. Daniel, which took place around the altar containing his body.

Due to its small size, the artwork was probably moved around during liturgies or small processions, as it was easy to carry. It is questionable whether it might have been exposed to a large public as its size was probably not suitable to be seen from a long distance.

== See also ==
- Padua Cathedral
- Diocesan Museum of Padua
- Reliquary

== Bibliography ==
- Giovanna Baldissin Molli, Elda Martellozzo Forin, Inventari della Sacrestia della Cattedrale di Padova : secoli 14.-18, Saonara 2016
- Claudio Bellinati, Il Duomo di Padova e il suo Battistero, Trieste, 1977
- Marco Collareta, Giordana Mariani Canova, Anna Maria Spiazzi, Basilica del santo. Le oreficerie, Padova, 1995
- Celestino Crosato, Daniele, Santo, in La Cattedrale di Padova: archeologia, storia, arte, architettura, a cura di G. Zampieri, Roma, 2016
- Giuseppina De Sandre Gasparini, Statuti di confraternite religiose di Padova nel Medio Evo, Padova, 1974
- Ashley Elston, Pain, Plague, and Power in Niccolò Semitecolo's Reliquary Cupboard for Padua Cathedral, in Gesta, Vol. 51, No. 2, 2012
- Andrea Moschetti, Il tesoro del Duomo di Padova, in Dedalo VI, 1925
- Anna Maria Spiazzi, Oreficeria sacra in Veneto, Cittadella, 2004
