= Martyrdom of Saint Sebastian (Semitecolo) =

Painting by Nicolò Semitecolo

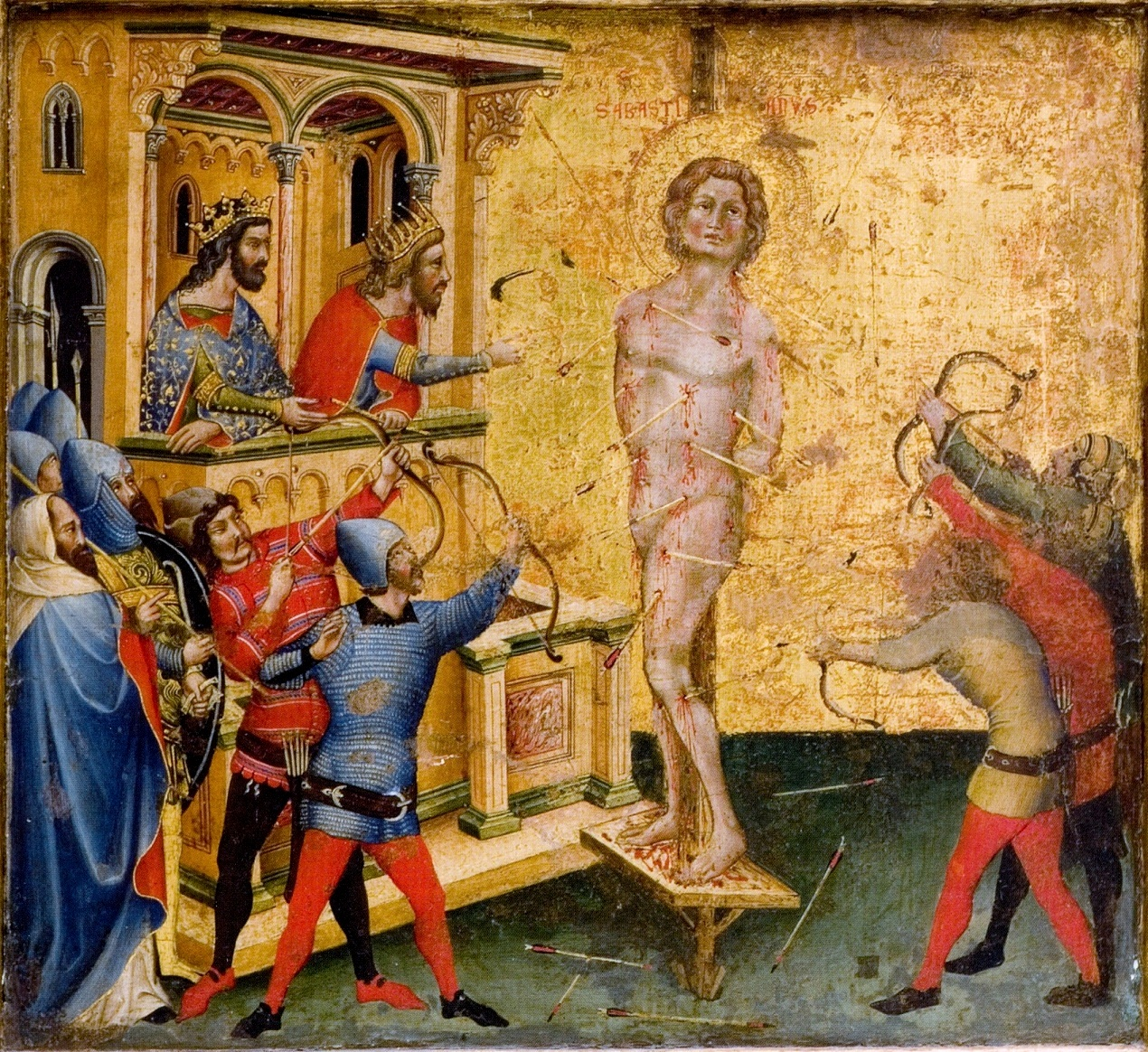
- Artist: Niccolò Semitecolo
- Year: 1367
- Medium: Tempera on wood
- Dimensions: 53 cm × 60 cm (21 in × 24 in)
- Location: Diocesan museum of Padua, Italy, Padua

The Martyrdom of Saint Sebastian (Italian: Martirio di San Sebastiano or Italian: Saettatura di San Sebastiano), once part of the Saint Sebastian altarpiece, is a tempera on wood panel painting by Nicolò Semitecolo dated to 1367 on one panel. The painting is now in the Diocesan museum of Padua, Italy together with six other panels from the same artist. Before being separated, all were part of a large altarpiece or other group piece in Padua Cathedral. The initial arrangement of the panels within the altarpiece was not recorded, and is still being debated among scholars.

It is complicated by the only remaining double-sided panel having its images with different vertical orientations, ie when one face is the right way up, the other is upside down. This rules out the typical arrangement for a polyptych altarpiece with different "views", where the panels are on "wings" that fold out horizontally on hinges.

== History ==
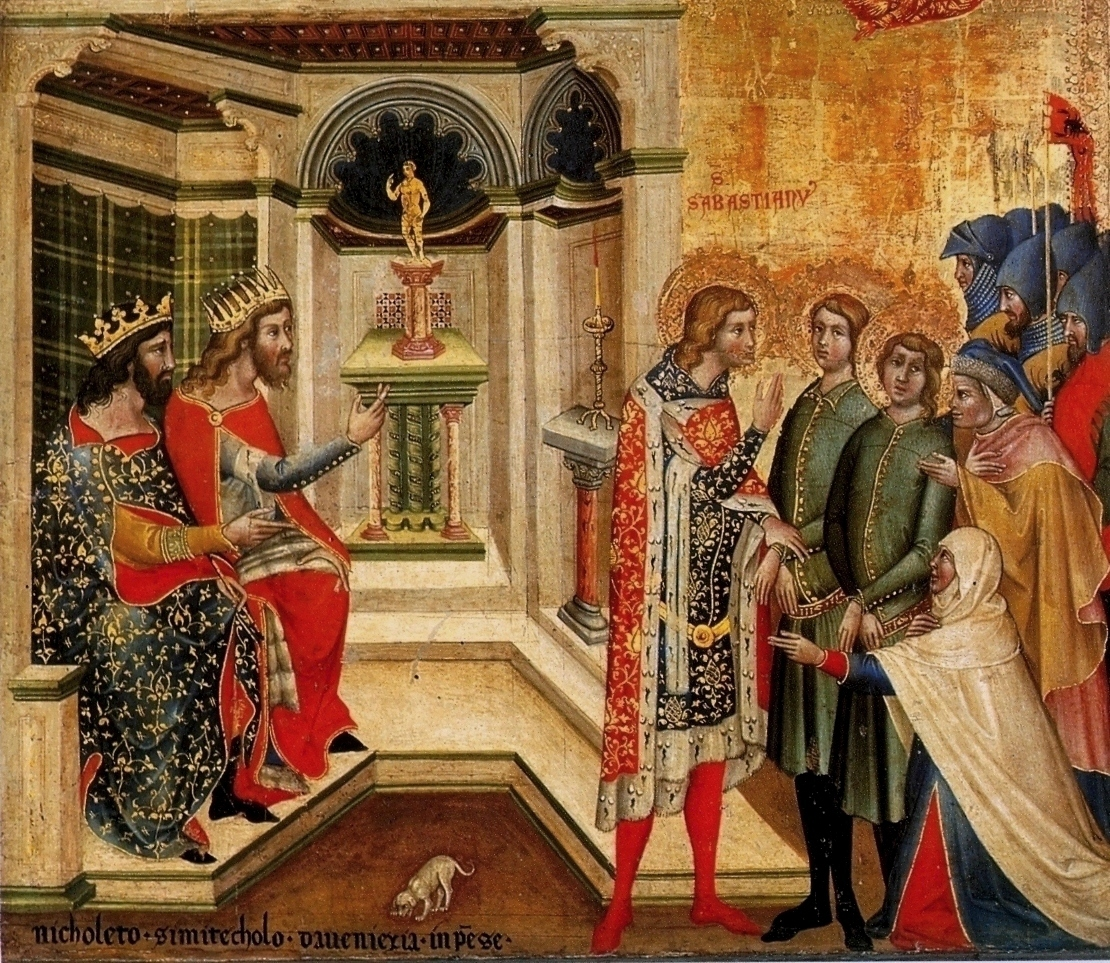
The Judgment of Sebastian

The Saettatura (Shooting of Arrows) panel is the only one signed by Semitecolo and stands as an important source of information. The complete altarpiece is composed of six panels, four of which depict Saint Sebastian's martyrdom, including the Saettatura. The others are:

- the Judgment
- the Flagellation
- the Deposition – all of Sebastian

While the two remaining panels depict:

- the Holy Trinity
- the Madonna of Humility

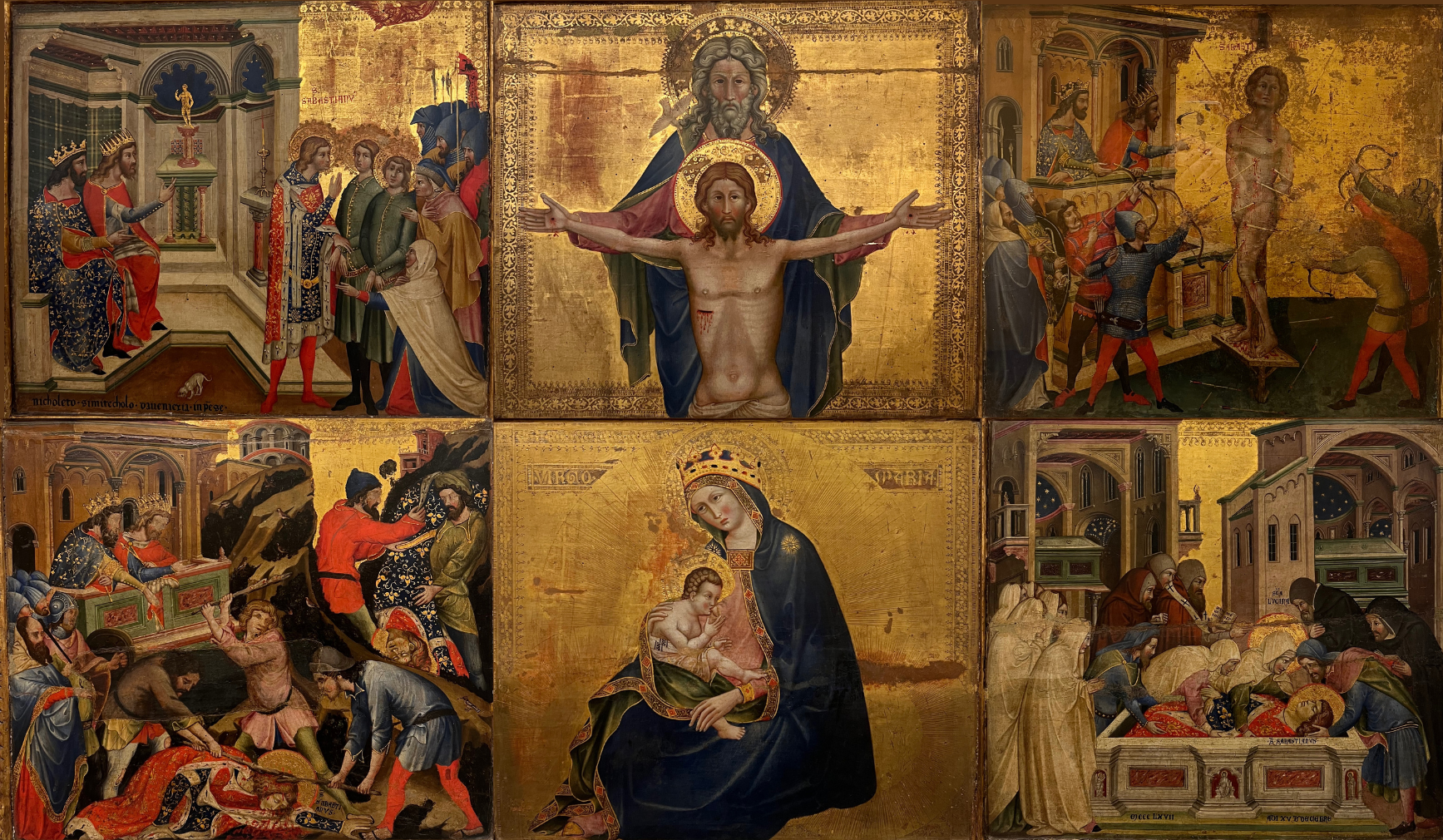
One reconstruction of the altarpiece's main face

Initially the Judgment, the Holy Trinity and the Saettatura must have all been painted on both sides of the panel, now the only remaining panel painted on both sides is the Saettatura The back, flipped upside-down, depicts Saint Daniel on a red background. Currently there are more than the six original pieces due to sawing apart double-sided panels, a not uncommon practice when double-sided panels came out of their original use. When exactly these alterations were made is unknown, however, the notebook of the Sacresty from 1534, which reports on a "Pala lignea Altaris Sti. Sebastiani", which could refer to S. Sebastian work. This piece of evidence could indicate that the six panels were located on the Saint Sebastian Altar, although, due to it being dismantled between 1550 and 1574, there is no certain proof.

The dismantlement of the art piece not only makes the original disposition unclear, but has also caused the dispersal of the single panels. The two panels cut in half in thickness, the Judgment and the Holy Trinity, are separated from their original reverse sides. It can be hypothesized that their reverses represented another Saint Sebastian and a Christ flanked by Mary and St. John Evangelist.

The back side panels, despite their extensive damages, still show some joining points: Saint Sebastian 's panel still shows a piece on Mary's cloak, making likely the connection between the panels making the reconstruction of the piece a little easier.

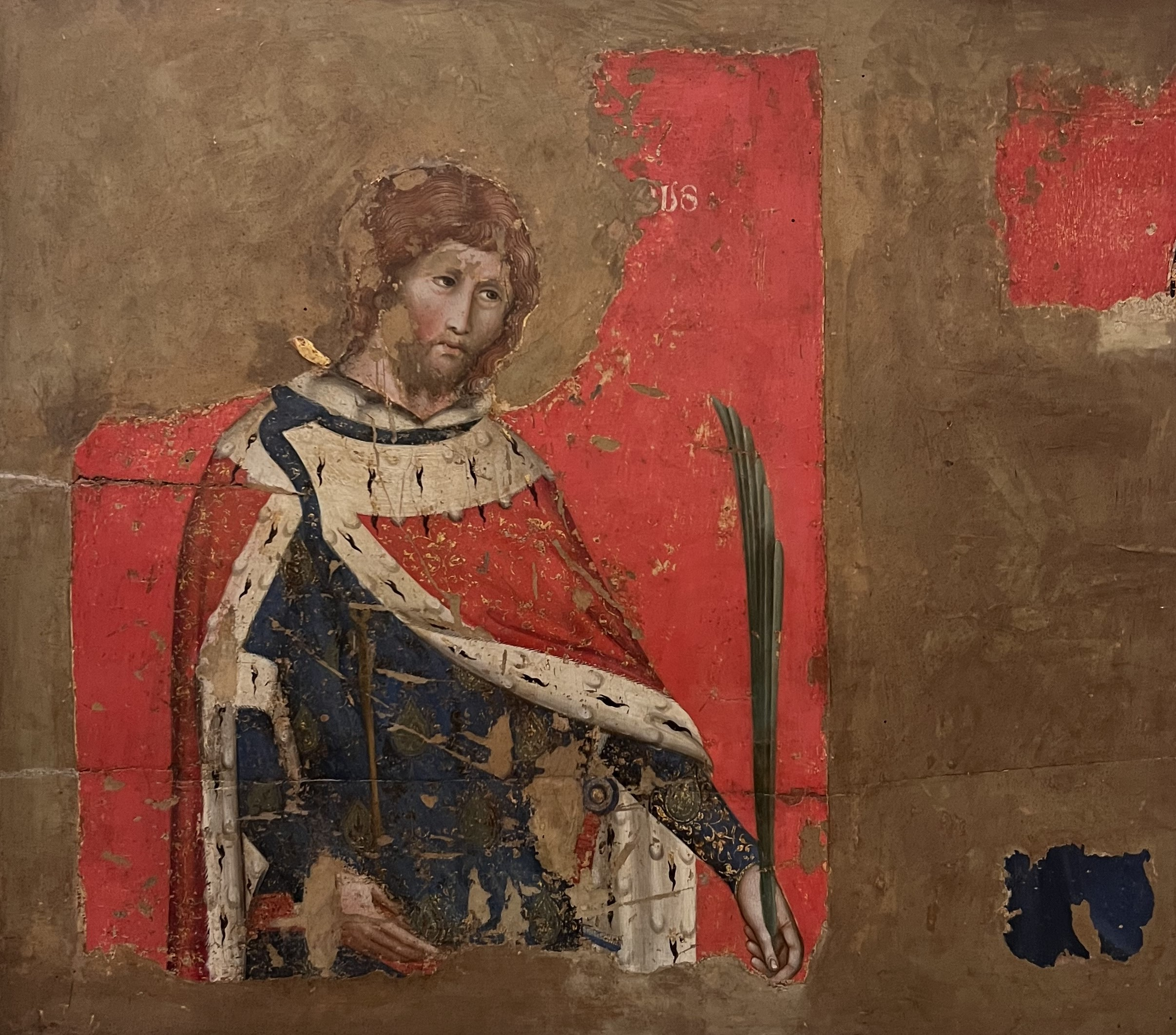
Saint Sebastian, reverse of the Judgment

During the XVIII century all the panels were mentioned: four of them, the ones representing the martyrdom are mentioned in 1776 by Rossetti in its description of Padua, the Trinity and the Madonna of Humility are mentioned in 1795 by Pietro Brandolese. The discussion among scholars begins in 1927 when the St. Sebastian, the back side panel of the Judgment, resurfaced and made clear that the panels were divided in half. The last panel to resurface in the private market in 1978 was the Christ flanked by Mary and St. John, displayed at the Art Venitien en Suisse et au Liechtenstein exhibition.

== Description ==
The four panels depicting Saint Sebastian focus mainly on the long martyrdom of the saint, rather than his posthumous miracles. The body of the suffering saint is emphasized by depicting it much bigger than the other figures, and through gruesome and bloody depictions of the episodes of his death. The four panels are also set in a specific sequence by the background architecture on a gold background, except for the Trinity and the Madonna of Humility which have a simple gold background. The reverse sides of the panels have a red background.

=== Iconography ===
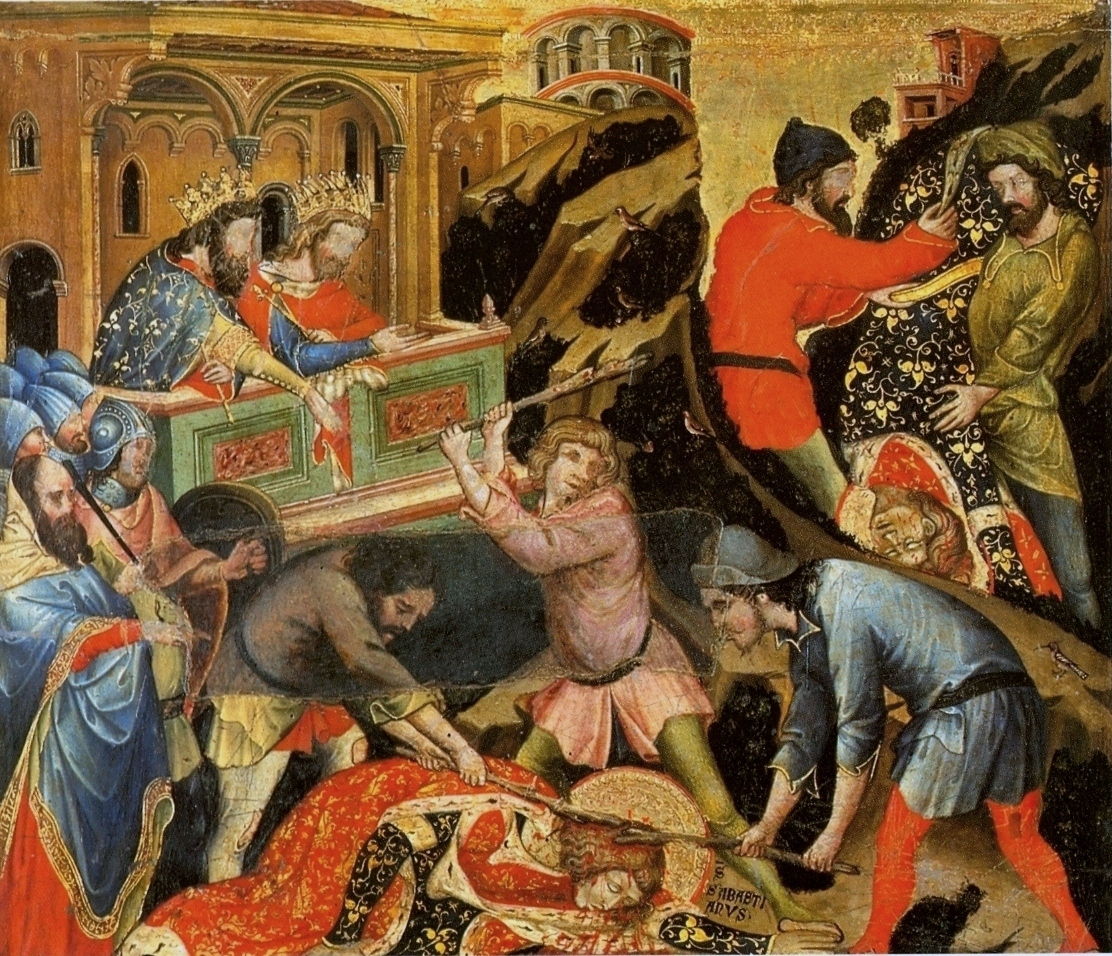
The Flagellation of Sebastian

To better understand the iconographic choices, it is necessary to take into consideration the historical context of Padua in the second half of the 14th century, characterized by the transition from a communal form of government to seigneural rule by the Carrara's family, which caused political conflicts with other confining states and internal strife. The already complicated political situation was worsened by waves of plague, which affected mostly the younger generation not yet immune to the disease, causing approximately 40,000 deaths in the city, a huge number.

This specific historic moment could explain the choice to represent Saint Sebastian, regarded as a key protector from plague and other infectious diseases, on the reliquary. Saint Sebastian became known as a protector against infectious diseases around the seventh century, when the city of Ravenna was hit by the plague and the city of Rome sent a relic of the Saint as a form of aid. Another possibility as to why this type of depiction was chosen, might be due to the similarities between the saint's wounds caused by his martyrdom and the wounds the plague would leave on its victims. The iconographic choice to represent a saint who suffered the same pain as Padua's population allowed the beholders to identify with someone who could protect and intercede for the city in such a difficult moment.

We have no certain sources about the patrons, but the political context suggests that it could have been the Carrara, the seigneural family, in an attempt to ensure their spot in paradise, to demonstrate their wealth and to strengthen the link between the family's power and the church's power.

=== Liturgical use ===
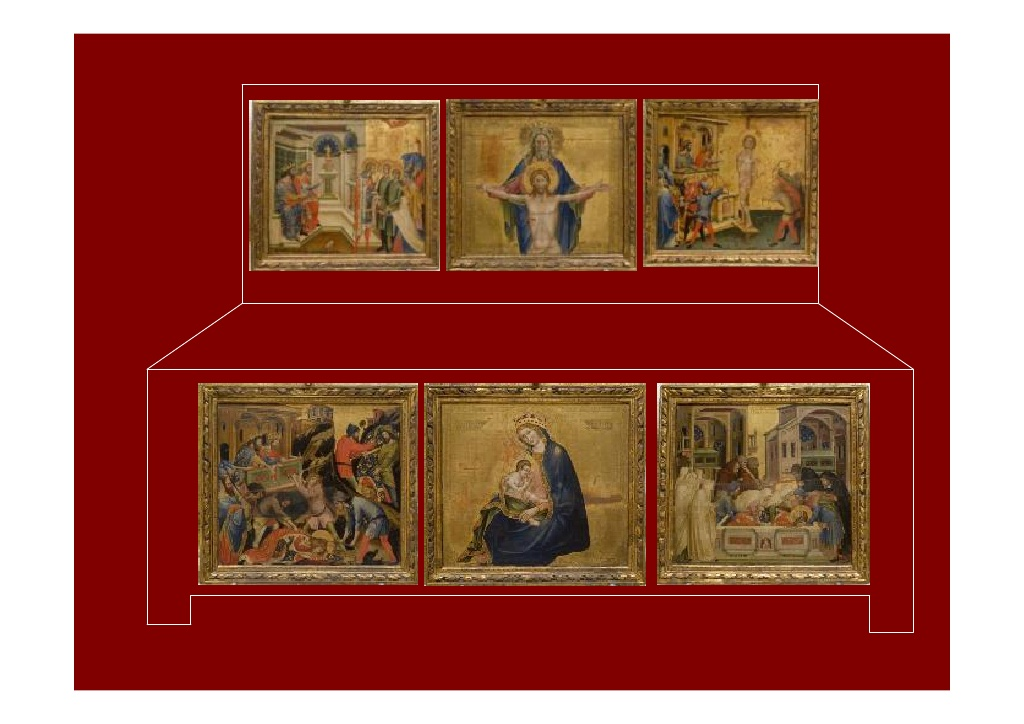
Another possible reconstruction, as a reliquary chest

After the last panel was discovered in 1978 a new hypothesis was formulated regarding the reconstruction of the art piece. It is suggested that the panels could have decorated a caspa-reliquiarum or reliquary chest, although, it is not a widely accepted theory, it may be compatible with the correct disposition of the panels. The closed caspa would have shown the Judgment, the Saettatura and the Holy Trinity, the Flagellation, the Deposition and the Madonna of Humility, and the panels with Saint Sebastian, Saint Daniel and Christ flanked by Mary and St. John Evangelist with the red background would have been visible only when the caspa was opened.

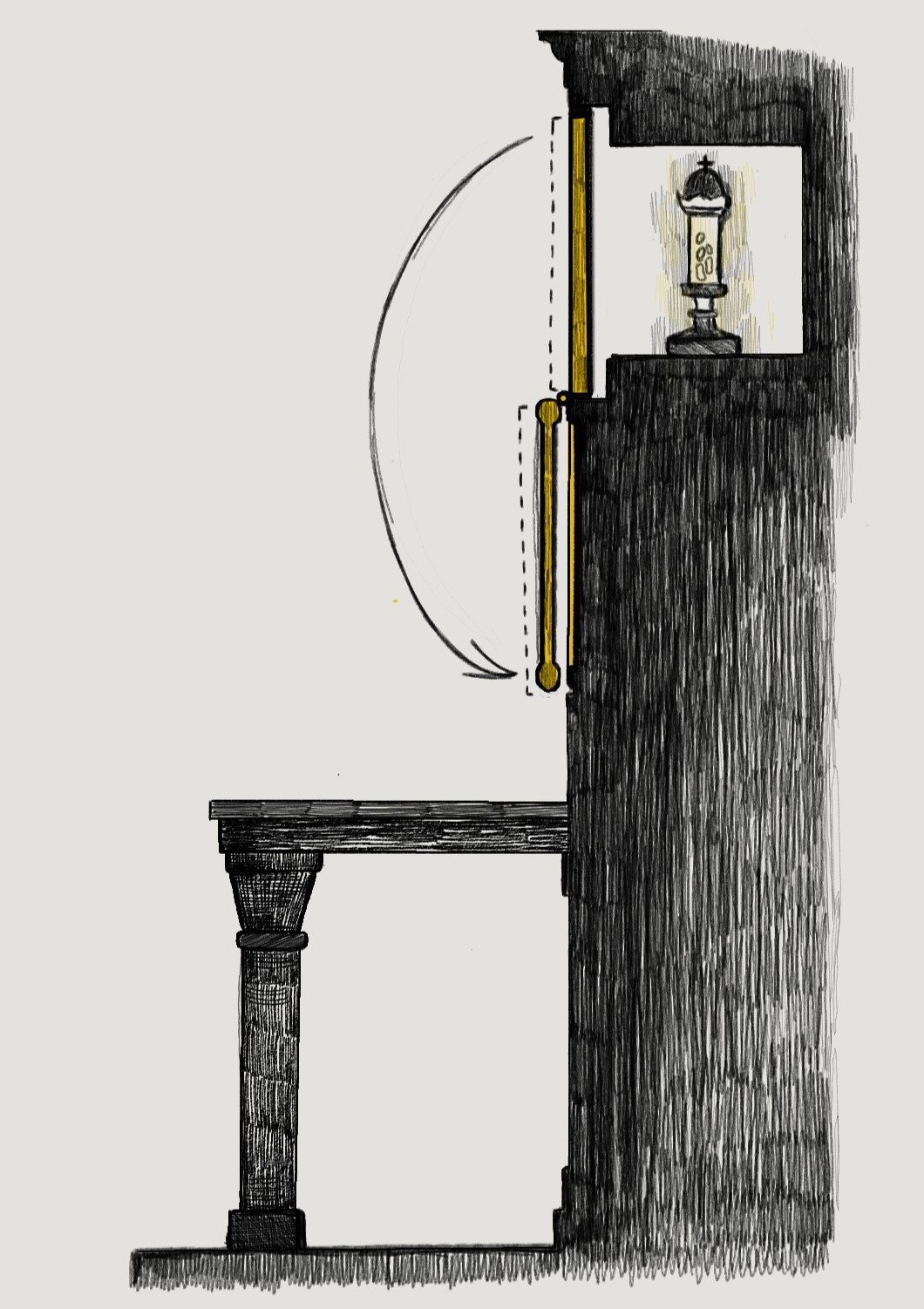
Illustration of a possible original arrangement, with the panels folding down to reveal the relics

Another possible reconstruction was an arrangement over the altar of the six panels representing the saint in two rows of three panels each, to cover a niche containing the relics, which could be opened to show the relics and the panels with the red background.

=== Placement inside the Duomo ===
The exact placement inside the Duomo (cathedral) is unknown, but the most likely locations are the sacristy or St. Sebastian altar:

- The sacristy: placement inside the sacristy seems to be the most likely considering the use of the art work as a relic holder. If it were placed in the sacristy it would probably have been accessible only to the Duomo's priests and to relatively high status laiety.
- Saint Sebastian's altar: some sources report the existence of an altarpiece which could have had a double use as a relic holder, and would have been opened on special occasions or celebrations in which the showing of the relics would have been fundamental to the religious narration.

== Bibliography ==
- Claudio Bellinati, Le tavolette del Semitecolo (1367) nella Pinacoteca dei Canonici di Padova, Atti e memorie dell'Accademia Patavina di Scienze, Lettere ed Arti, 104, 1991–92.
- Sergio Bettini, Contributo al Semitecolo; and L. Coletti, "Studi alla pittura del Trecento a Padova," Rivista d'arte, 12, 1930, pp. 323–80.
- Ashley Elston, Pain, Plague, and Power in Niccolò Semitecolo's Reliquary Cupboard for Padua Cathedral, Gesta, Vol. 51, No. 2, September 2012, pp. 111–127.
- Ashley Elston, Storing Sanctity: Sacristy Reliquary Cupboards in Late Medieval and Renaissance Italy, Dissertation, University of Kansas, Lawrence, 2011, pp. 73–158.
- Cristina Guarnieri, Una pala ribaltabile per l'esposizione delle reliquie: le storie di Santa Lucia di Jacobello del Fiore a Fermo, in Arte Veneta 73, 2016.
- Giulia Rossi Scarpa, Nicoletto Semitecolo nel Duomo di Padova, in Dipinti veneti: Collezione Luciano Sorlini, ed. R. Polacco, Carzago di Calvagese della Riviera, 2000
- Evelyn Sandberg Vavala, Semitecolo and Guariento, Art in America and Elsewhere, 22/1, 1933, pp. 2–3
