= Madonna and Child (Schiavone) =

c. 1460 painting by Giorgio Schiavone

- Madonna i dijete (Croatian)
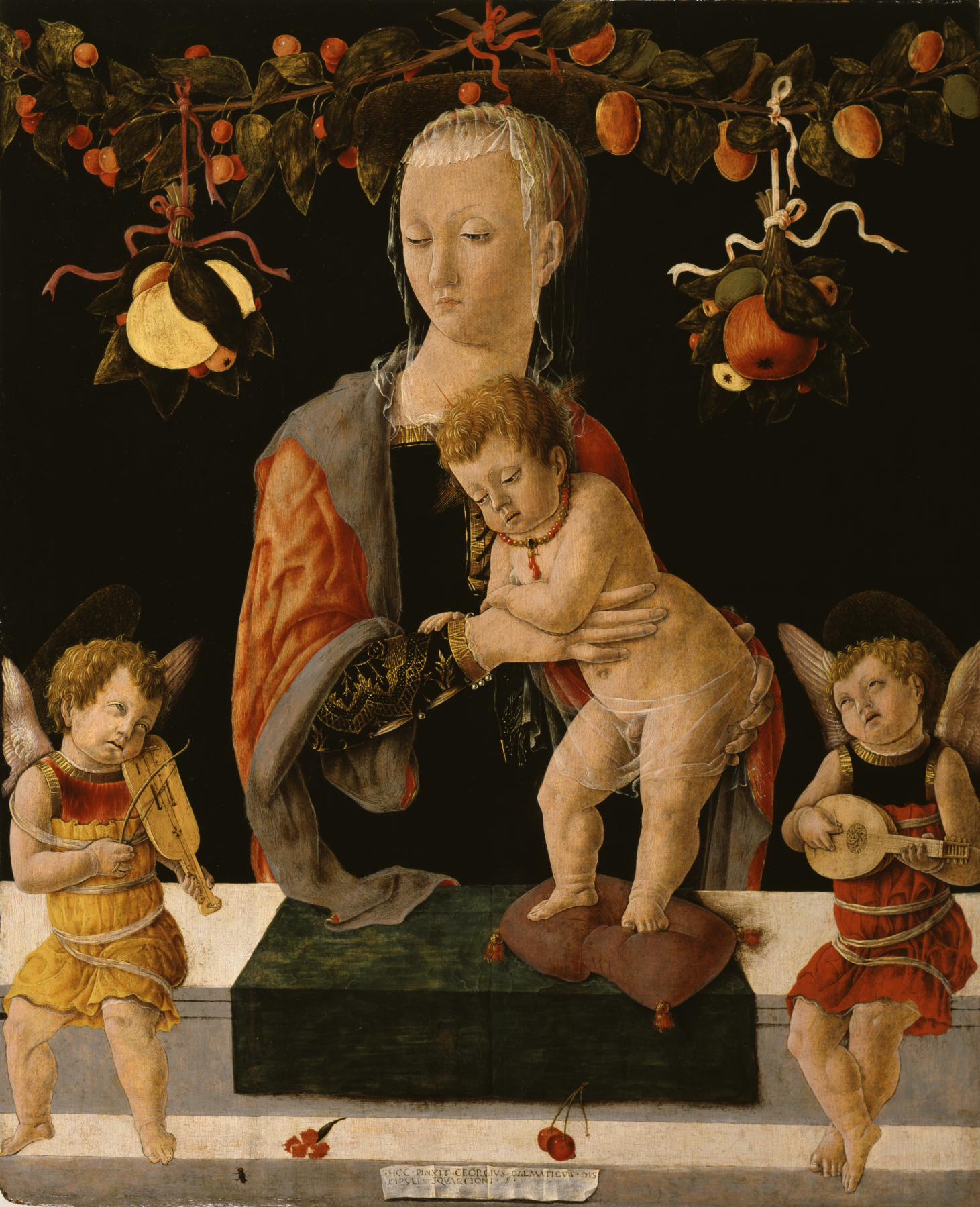
- Artist: Giorgio Schiavone
- Year: 1459
- Medium: Oil on panel
- Movement: Renaissance
- Dimensions: 69 cm × 56.7 cm (27 in × 22.3 in)
- Location: Walters Art Museum, Baltimore
- Owner: Henry Walters
- Accession: 1903-1234

Madonna and Child is a c. 1459-1460 oil on panel painting by Giorgio Schiavone. The devotional painting depicts Madonna and Christ Child, shown from behind a parapet. Christ is wearing coral necklace. Coral was believed to ward off the devil and coral teething rings or necklaces were often given to babies. Two angel musicians sit on the balustrade.

Schiavone was born in Dalmatia, now Croatia. He immigrated to northern Italy and studied in the workshop of Francesco Squarcione in Padua. The paper at the bottom has an inscription: ".HOC. PINXIT. GEORGIVS. DALMATICVS. DIS | CIPVLVS. SQVARCIONI. S." It translates to "Giorgio Dalmaticus, pupil of Squarcione, painted this."

It was produced during his time in Francesco Squarcione's studio in Padua.

The work appeared on the art market in 1922 and was bought by Henry Walters three years later. It is now in the Walters Art Museum.
