= Niccolò Semitecolo =

Italian painter

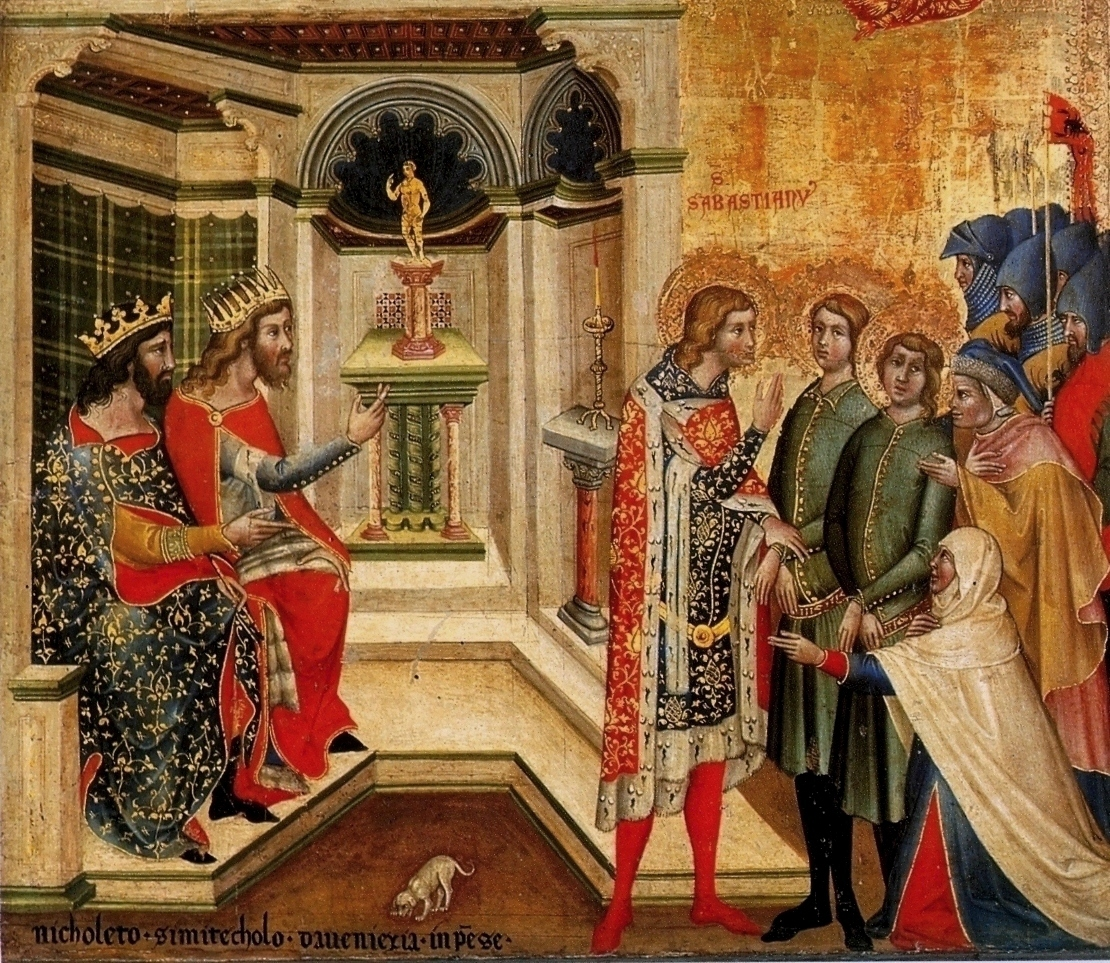
Judgement of Saint Sebastian (1367), Tempera on wood, 65 x 72 cm. In the sacristy of Padua Cathedral

Niccolò Semitecolo was a 14th-century Venetian painter (born in Venice) painter of the early-Renaissance period, active mainly in Venice and Padua. His work demonstrates the influence of Giotto. He is first recorded in 1353.

Apart from a number of Madonnas and other religious works, his main work is a rather puzzling and now dispersed set of panels for a polyptych work on the Martyrdom of Saint Sebastian for Padua Cathedral, several panels of which are now in the Diocesan Museum there, with another still in the cathedral. It is signed and dated 1367.

A large hanging crucifix in the Church of the Eremitani in Padua is attributed to him. This is next door to the Scrovegni Chapel where Giotto completed his most famous fresco cycle in about 1305.
