= Martyrdom of Saint Sebastian (Signorelli) =

Painting by Luca Signorelli

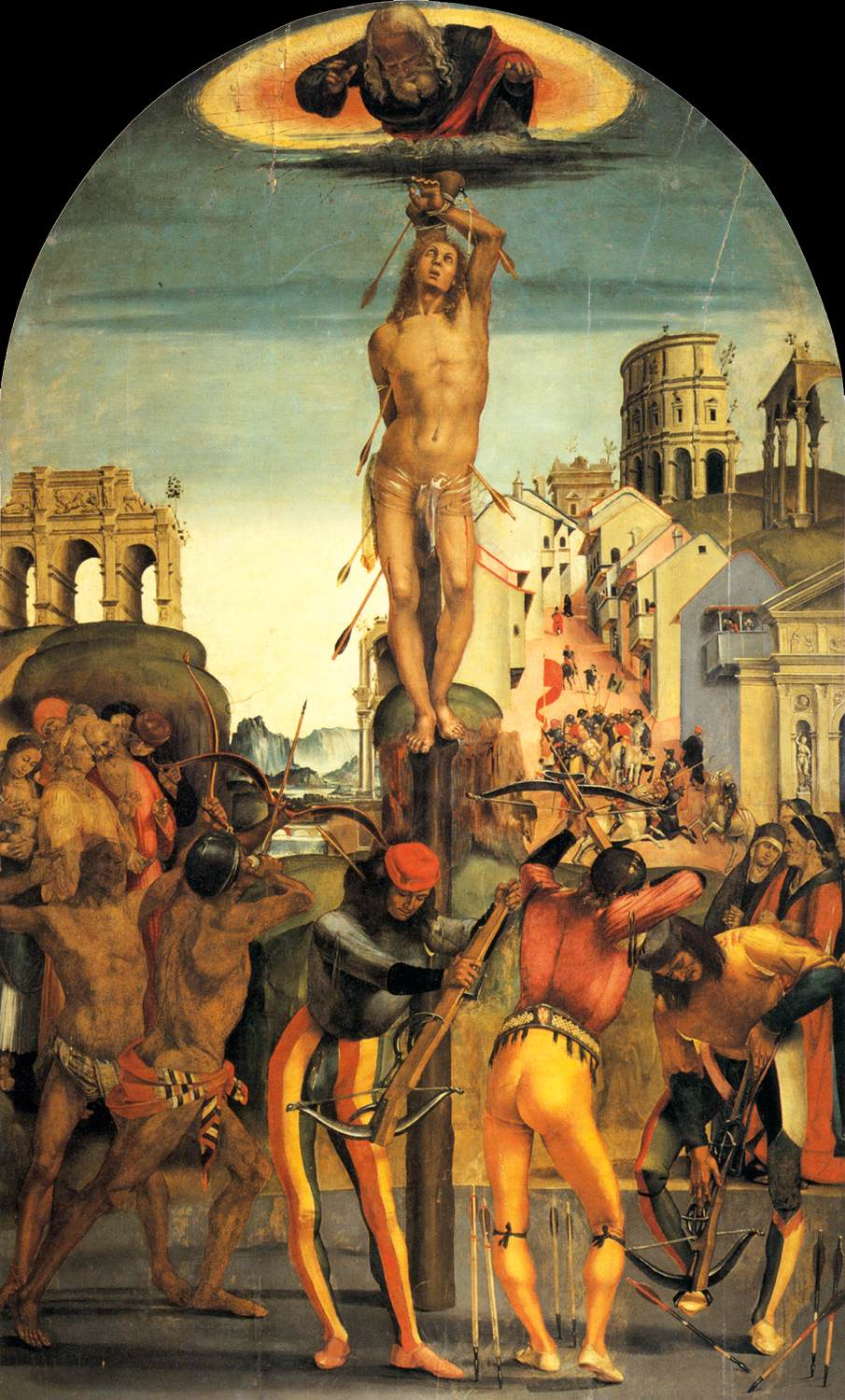
Martyrdom of Saint Sebastian (1498) by Luca Signorelli

Martyrdom of Saint Sebastian is a 1498 tempera on panel painting by Luca Signorelli, now in the Pinacoteca Comunale in Città di Castello. Its date was on its predella, which is now lost. It was the third major work Signorelli produced in Città di Castello and the only one still in the city.
