= The Martyrdom of Saint Sebastian (Leonardo) =

Drawing by Leonardo da Vinci

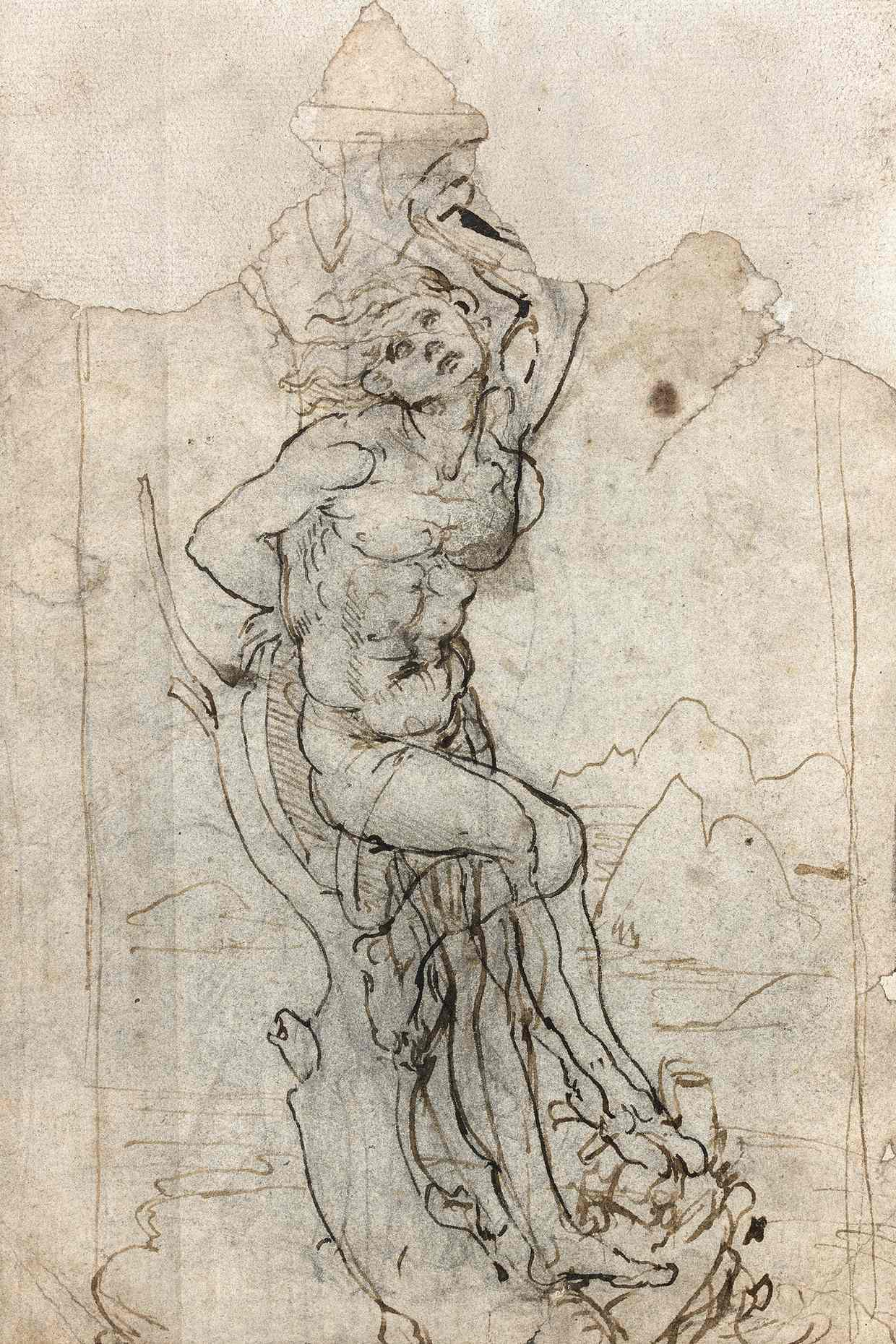
- Artist: Leonardo da Vinci
- Year: c. 1482
- Medium: Ink on paper
- Subject: Saint Sebastian
- Dimensions: 19.3 cm × 13 cm (7.5 in × 5 in)

The Martyrdom of Saint Sebastian is a drawing by Leonardo da Vinci showing the martyrdom of Saint Sebastian. It was rediscovered in Paris in March 2016, classed as a "trésor national" and presented to the press on 10 January 2017. Its auction estimate was 15,000,000 Euros, and it was placed under an export ban in June 2017, giving French museums 30 months to raise sufficient funds to buy it.

== See also ==
- List of works by Leonardo da Vinci
