= Jacopo da Montagnana =

Italian painter (1440s–1499)

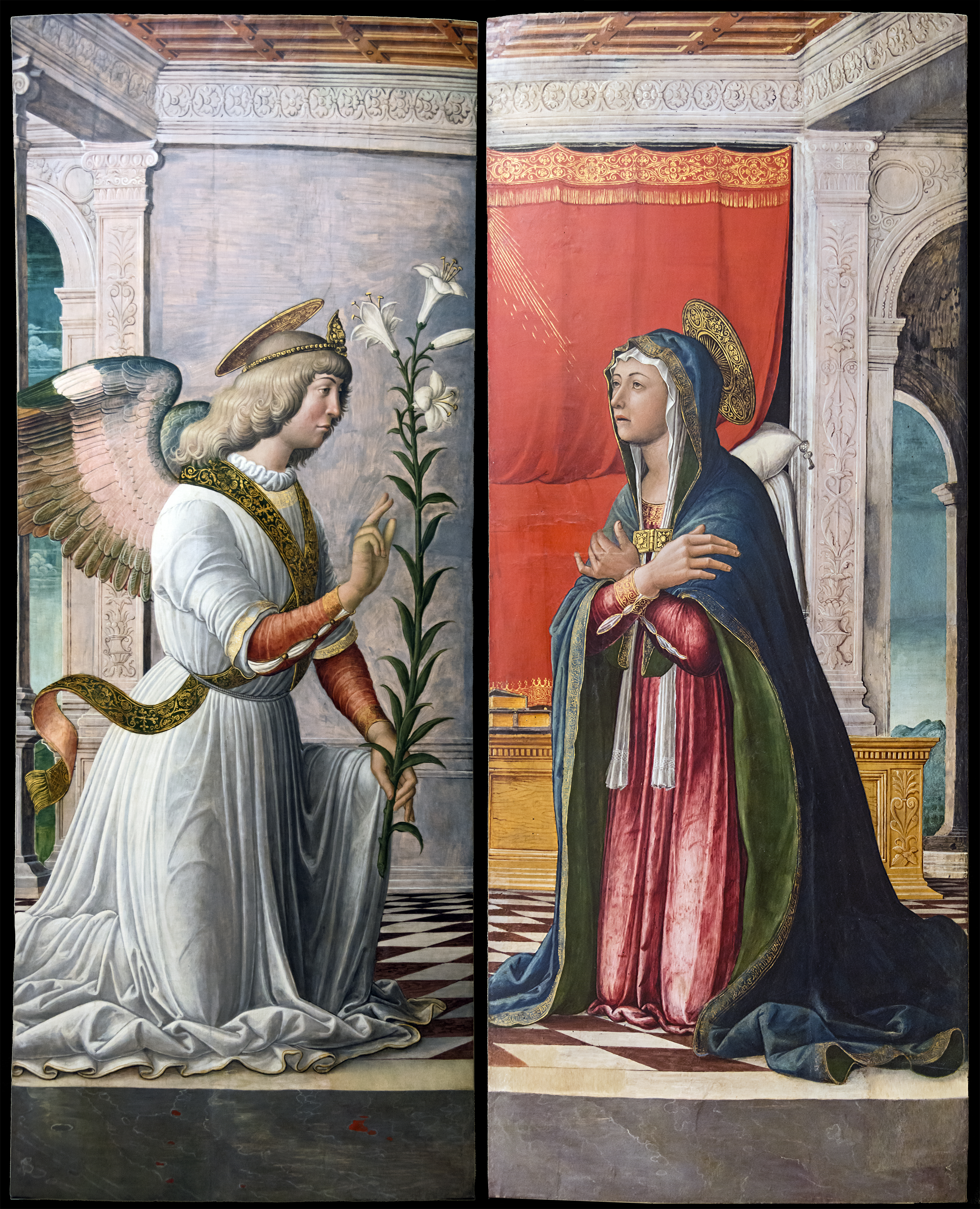
The Archangel Gabriel and the Virgin Annunciate, Gallerie dell'Accademia, Venice

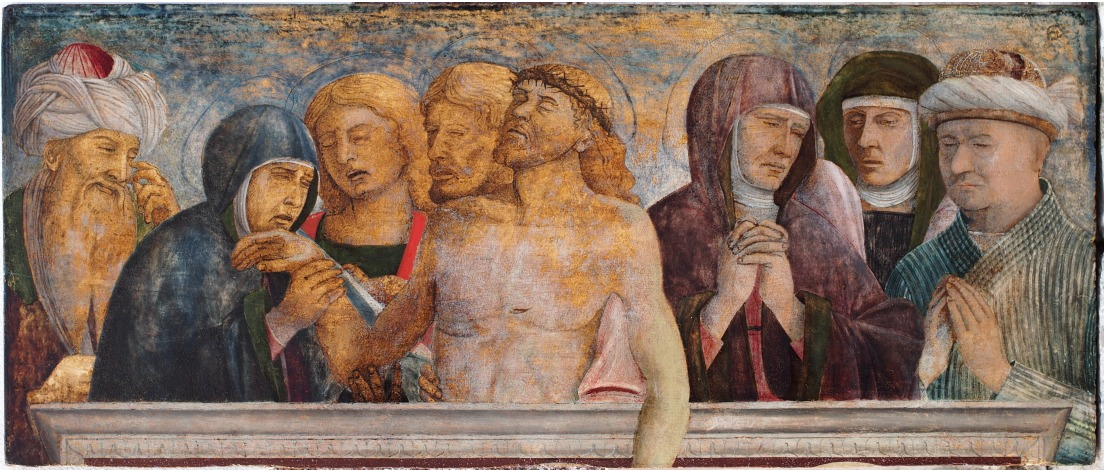
The entombment of Christ

Jacopo da Montagnana (c. 1440/1443 in Montagnana – between 20 April and 14 August 1499 in Padua), also known as Jacopo Parisati or Parisato, was an Italian painter of the early Renaissance who was mainly active in the Padua area.

== Life ==
He was born in Montagnana, but mainly active in Padua where he died. He was either a pupil or influenced by Andrea Mantegna and/or Gentile Bellini. He is considered a major Quattrocento painter in Padua.

He was active in the fresco decoration of the Capella Santa Maria degli Angeli in the Palazzo Vescovile of Padua, erected in 1495, and frescoed by Jacopo and Prospero da Piazzola. Also contemporary in Padua at that time was Pietro Calzetta and Francesco Bazelieri.
