= San Francesco Grande, Padua =

Church in Padua, Italy

Coordinates: 45.4049°N 11.8806°E

San Francesco Grande
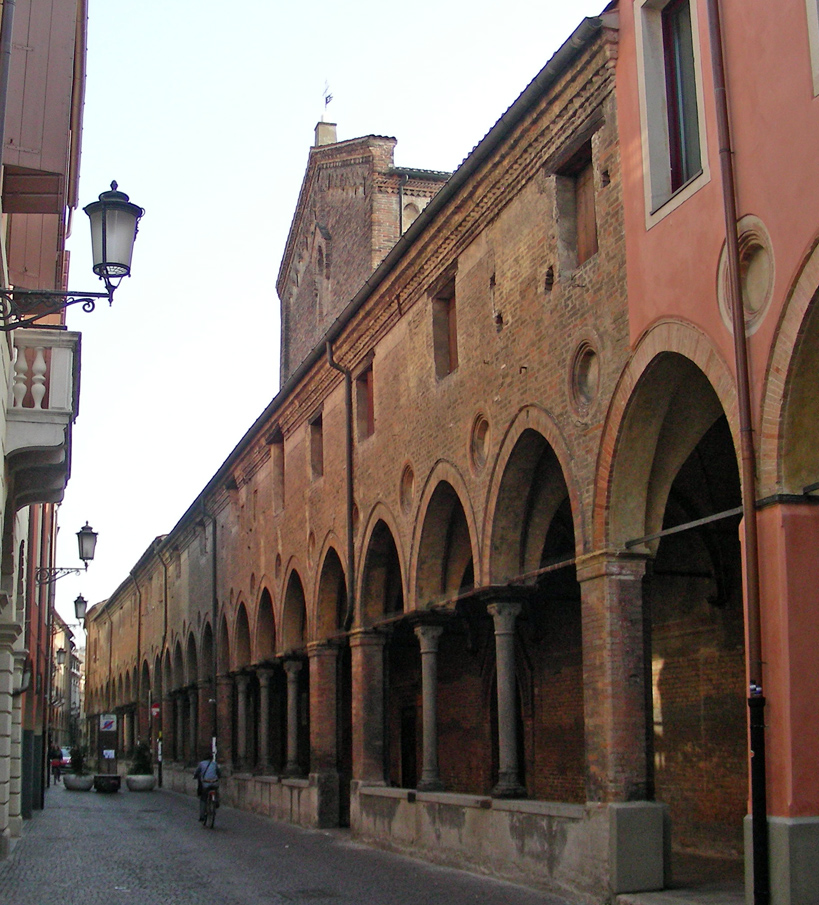
- The porch and the facade.

Religion
- Affiliation: Catholic
- Diocese: Diocese of Padua
- Province: Veneto
- Rite: Roman Catholic western rite
- Leadership: Baldo de Bonafarii and Sibilla de Cetto
- Year consecrated: 1430

Location
- Location: Padova Padova - Stemma.png
- Interactive map of San Francesco Grande

Architecture
- Architect: Nicholas Gobbo
- Type: Church
- Style: Gothic
- Groundbreaking: 1416
- Completed: 16th Century
- Direction of façade: N

The church dedicated to saint Francis of Assisi, known for centuries as San Francesco Grande (to avoid confusion with the church of San Francesco Piccolo which was gone by the sixteenth century) is a religious building on the Via San Francesco, previously overlooks the Contra porteghi high in Padua, Italy. Through the efforts of Baldo de Bonafarii and Sibilla de Cetto, the convent of the Friars Minor and the Hospital of Saint Francis, Major (or Greater), operated until 1798.

== History ==
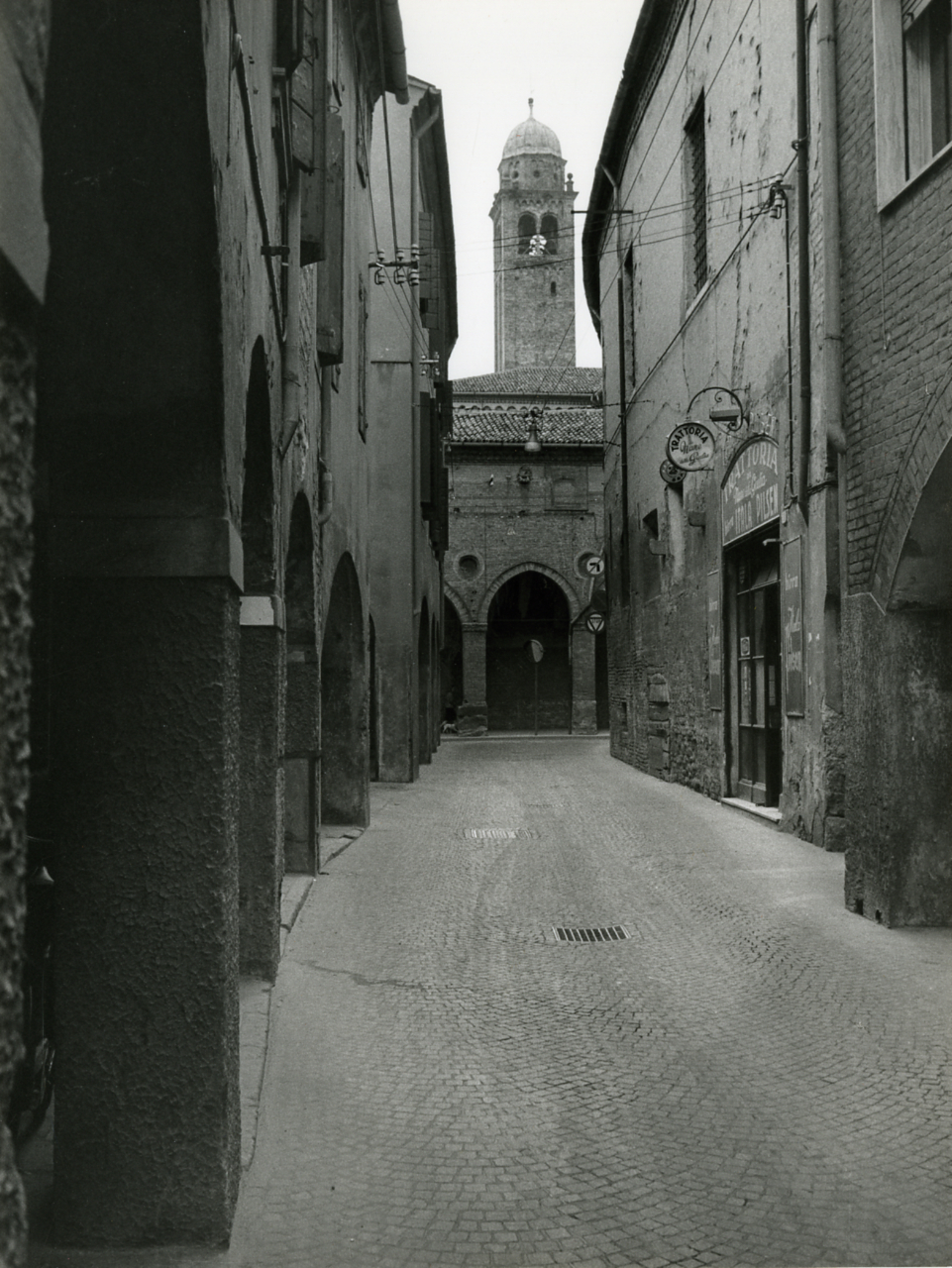
Bell tower and facade seen from via Santa Sofia. Photo by Paolo Monti, 1967.

On December 29, 1414, before the Bishop of Padua, the Bishop Pietro Marcello and other witnesses, Bonafari Baldo and his wife Sybil from Cetto declared they want to allocate part of their property to the construction of a church and monastery with a hospital in Santa Contrà Margaret, to be allocated to the Friars Minor. Bonafari reserved the right to elect the rector of the hospital, which on his death would go to the College of Lawyers of the University of Padua. The foundation stone was laid on 25 October 1416 by the Archpriest of the Cathedral, Bartholomew of Astorelli. The church in the parish of San Lorenzo at first caused some uncertainty; until the Bishop agreed to allow the work to continue. Master builder Nicholas Gobbo led the project. After the death of Bonafari the work was completed by his wife Sybil. In his will of November 1421, Bonafari asked to be buried in the new church.

The building was built on a Latin cross, in Gothic style; it was consecrated on October 24, 1430. In the middle of the fifteenth century the chronicler Savonarola calls templum quidem magnum but at the end of the century it was already insufficient for the community of Minors. At the beginning of the sixteenth century the church was enlarged in the direction of the architect Lorenzo da Bologna. The fifteenth-century church – a Latin cross with three apses divided by the choir and nave, three chapels communicating on the left side – was widely enlarged: it was built a large sanctuary that welcomed new large choir stalls. The fifteenth-century nave was flanked by two wide aisles with chapels. The church was now the subject of great works of tone evergetico that enriched the building especially in the sixteenth and seventeenth century. In 1728 the Bishop of Padua counted 22 altars, which had declined to 17 during the visit of Bishop Dondi Clock in 1809.

Due to the Napoleonic suppressions the community of Friars Observant left the building and the convent in April 1810 and in the same year it became parish church organized by the secular clergy. Absorbed in the parish of St. Stephen, then in 1808 into the parish of San Lorenzo and San Giorgio. In 1862 the floor was restored with the removal of the many tombstones which were there. The cloisters were also cleared of tombstones. In 1873 the church was the subject of a total restoration. In 1914 the Friars Minor returned to the church and part of the old convent and took possession of the parish still in their care. It submits to the parish with the title of the Oratory Church of Santa Margherita and parish property is also the School of Charity.

== Exterior ==
=== The porch ===
A "Verdeterra" of Francesco Squarcione.
The church is part of a huge complex with the convent on the left, and the hospital, on the right. A connection between the various functions is the long porch on the street, with thirty-seven arches with terracotta decorations; those corresponding to the church and convent are twenty-six and supported by columns. The portico, vaulted and decorated by the stories of St. Francis in "Verdeterra" (sort of grisaille) work of Francesco Squarcione executed between 1452 and 1466. Over time, it has deteriorated. By the middle of the eighteenth century the friars decided to cover it in white. Today, most of the figures are gone. In May 2014 it was proposed for restoration of the pictorial decoration.

=== The facade ===
The façade is fronted by a portico that faces east. At the top are decorated hanging arches and decorative bands terracotta. A large rose window is surmounted by a niche that probably protected a fresco which no longer exists. Entry to the building is through three portals: the central one is baroque, there are four symmetrical entries to the side aisles.

The nave is flanked by two aisle (one on each side). Its roof line is higher than the surrounding buildings. The nave and the transept are decorated with hanging arches of the fifteenth century. Along the walls are opened Gothic rose windows and mullioned windows from the sixteenth century. The aisles and long apse were enlarged to their present size in the late fifteenth century by Lorenzo da Bologna.

=== Bell Tower ===
The Belltower stands next to the left side of the apse. Gothic in design with decorated hanging arches. The bell, open on four large double windows on each side and consist of five bells. The tower is crowned with a dome covered with lead plates, supported by an octagonal drum.

== Interior ==
The interior is well lit and punctuated by vaults decorated with geometric bands. The four main columns are medieval of red marble, come from Piazza dei Signori and was donated in 1502 by the city. On the soffits are late-Gothic frescoes. Along the aisles it has set a remarkable eighteenth-century Via Crucis (Way of the Cross) in their original frames.

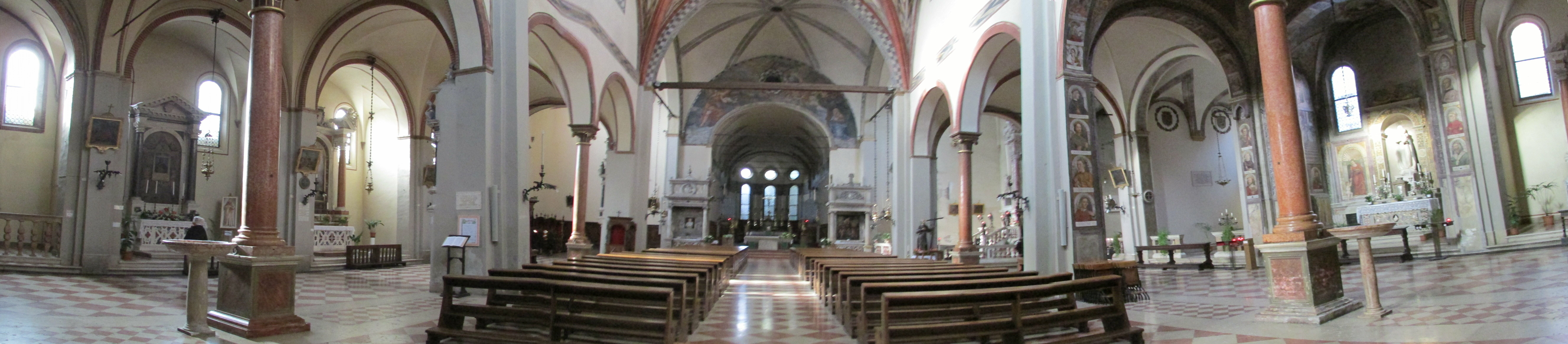
Church of San Francesco Grande (Padua) from the south aisle (left), across the Nave to the north aisle (right).

== See also ==
- Diocese of Padua
- University of Padua
- Andrea Briosco
- Bartolomeo Bellano
