= Nativity =

Nativity or The Nativity may refer to:

== Birth of Jesus Christ ==
- Nativity of Jesus, the Gospel stories of the birth of Jesus Christ
- Nativity of Jesus in art, any depiction of the nativity scene
  - Nativity (Barocci), a 1597 painting by Federico Barocci
  - The Nativity (Burne-Jones), 1888
  - Nativity (Campin), a 1420 panel painting by Robert Campin
  - The Nativity (Champaigne), c. 1643
  - Nativity (Christus), a devotional mid-1450s oil-on-wood panel painting by Petrus Christus
  - Nativity (Correggio), a painting finished around 1529–1530 by Antonio da Correggio
  - Nativity (El Greco), c. 1603-1605
  - The Nativity (Frontier), 1743
  - Nativity (Geertgen tot Sint Jans) or Nativity at Night, a painting of about 1490 by Geertgen tot Sint Jans
  - Nativity (Lanfranco), c. 1606-1607
  - Nativity (Lotto), 1523
  - Nativity (Masaccio) or Desco da parto, a birthing-tray painted by Masaccio
  - Nativity (Master of the Brunswick Diptych), c. 1495
  - Nativity (Parmigianino), c. 1521-1522
  - The Nativity of Christ (Poulakis), 1650-1674
  - The Nativity (Piero della Francesca), c. 1470-1475
  - Nativity (Simone dei Crocifissi), c. 1380
  - The Nativity (Victor)
  - Nativity play, a play which recounts the story of the Nativity of Jesus
  - Nativity scene or crèche, a three-dimensional display depicting the Nativity

== Film, television, and theater ==
- Nativity (film series), a 2009–2018 series of British family Christmas films
  - Nativity!, the 2009 first film in the series
- The Nativity (film), a 1978 American television film
- The Nativity (television drama), a 1952 American television film
- The Nativity (TV series), a 2010 British four-part drama series
- Nativity: A Life Story, a musical by Langston Hughes first staged in the mid-1990s

== Other uses ==
- La Navidad (The Nativity), a settlement founded in 1492 by Christopher Columbus, in present-day Haiti
- Natal chart or nativity, the horoscope at or of the time of one's birth
- Nativity BVM High School, a Catholic high school in Pottsville, Pennsylvania
- Nativity High School (Detroit, Michigan), former high school in Detroit, Michigan
- Nativity School (Cincinnati, Ohio), Catholic grade school in Cincinnati, Ohio

== See also ==
- Antigen nativity, an antigen before an APC binds to it
- Birth, the act or process of bearing or bringing forth offspring
- Christmas
- Native (disambiguation)
- Nativity of Mary, a Catholic feast day commemorating the birth of the Virgin Mary
- Nativity of St John the Baptist, a Christian feast day celebrating the birth of John the Baptist
- Nativity of the Theotokos, Eastern Orthodox feast day commemorating the birth of the Virgin Mary
- Nativism (disambiguation)
- Navidad (disambiguation)
