= Jacopo Avanzo =

Italian painter

Jacopo Avanzo (or Avanzi or Da Vanzo) of Verona, has long been confused with Jacopo degli Avanzi of Bologna; but the remains of an inscription in the Cappella San Giorgio point to Verona as the birthplace of Avanzo. He painted decorations, in conjunction with Altichiero da Zevio, in the Cappella San Felice and the Cappella San Giorgio in the church of Sant' Antonio at Padua, in 1377. It appears that the principal frescoes in the Cappella San Felice were the work of Altichiero; and of those in the Cappella San Giorgio, which were recovered from oblivion in 1837 by Dr. E. Förster, the part to be assigned to Altichiero has given rise to much dispute; but it is thought by some authorities that Avanzo executed the principal portion. The frescoes represent the earlier part of the 'History of our Lord,' the 'Coronation of the Virgin,' the 'Crucifixion,' and 'Legends of St. George, St. Catharine, and St. Lucy.' They prove the painter to have been an artist of no common genius, and Kugler, in his description of them, speaks of his art as being above that of his contemporaries. Avanzo also painted two triumphal processions in a public hall of Verona, which have long since perished. He died about the end of the 14th century.
