= Oratory of San Giorgio, Padua =

Church in Padua, Italy

Coordinates: 45°24′3.86″N 11°52′48.96″E

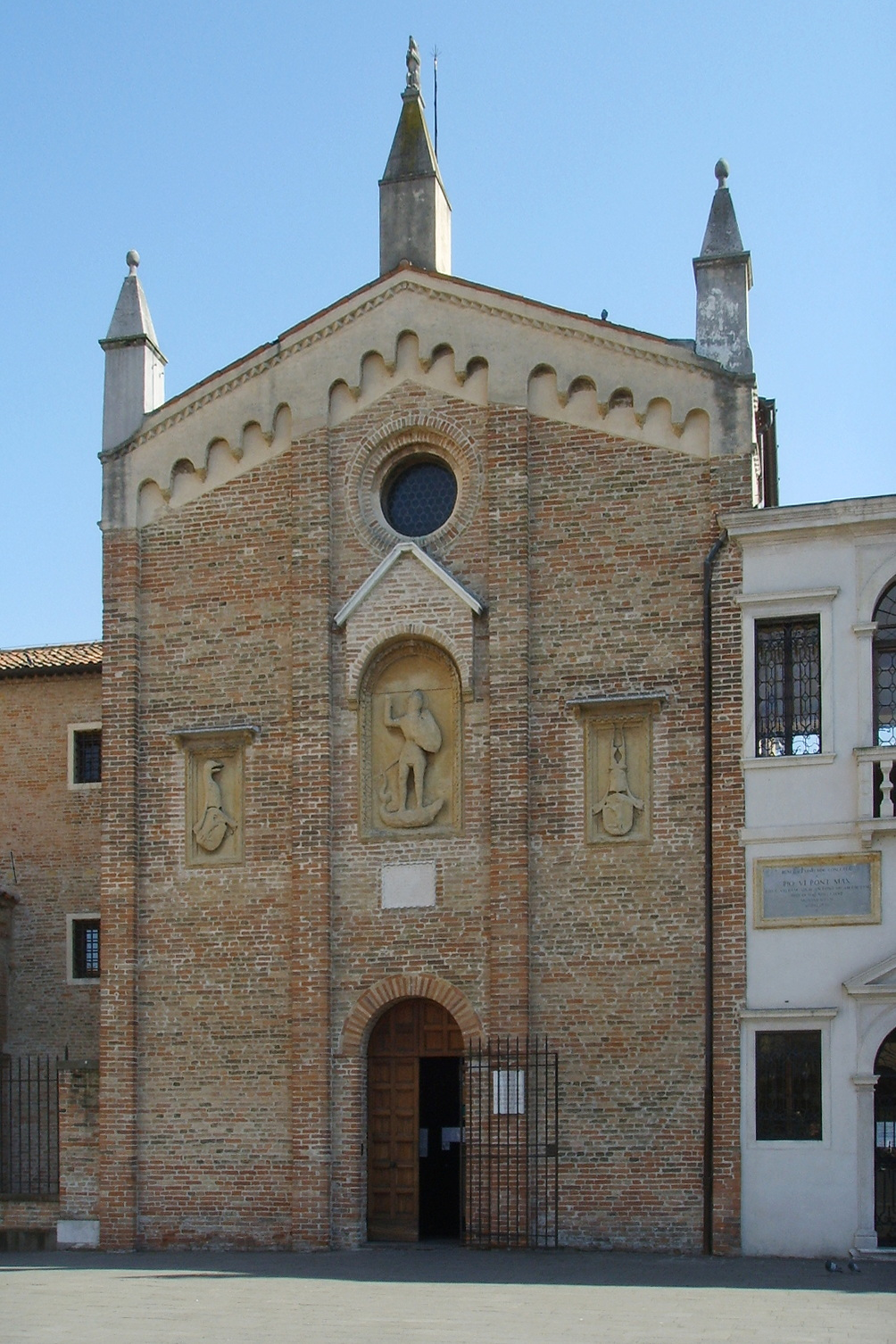
Exterior Façade

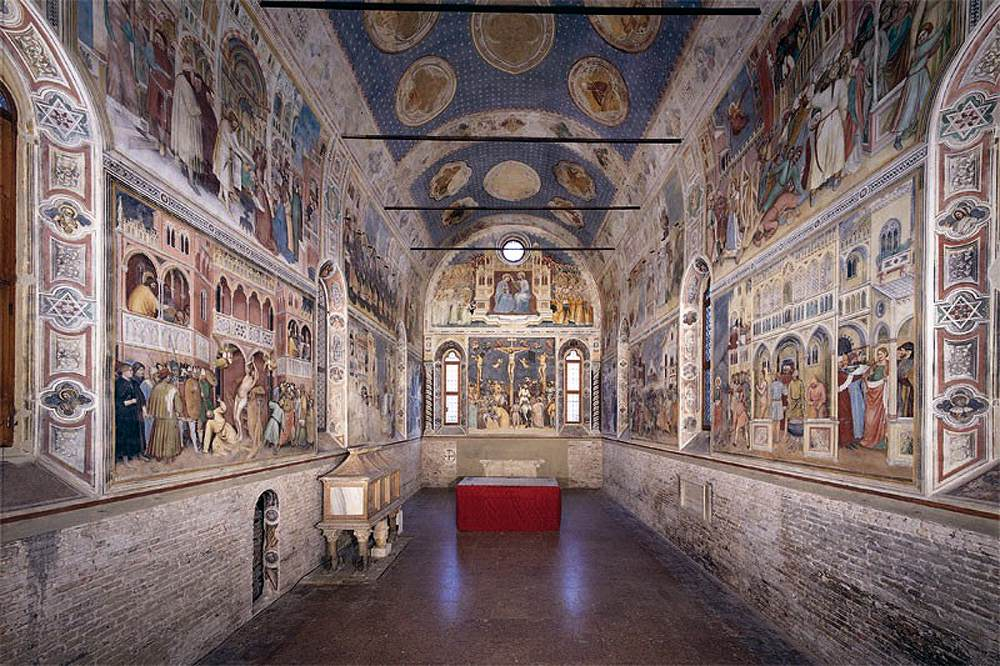
Interior seen from the entrance

The Oratorio di San Giorgio or St George's Oratory is a Gothic-style Roman Catholic oratory or prayer hall in Padua, region of Veneto, Italy. It is notable for its frescoed interiors. The oratory is part of the UNESCO World Heritage Site Padua's fourteenth-century fresco cycles, inscribed in 2021 for its exceptional example of 14th-century monumental painting.

== History ==
The oratory was initially built as a free-standing structure by the Marquis Soragna Raimondino de' Lupi in 1376 as a family funerary chapel. The Oratory is located on the same plaza as the imposing Basilica di Sant'Antonio di Padova. The interior walls are lined with twenty-two narrative frescoed images, commissioned by Raimondino de' Lupis, in the form of frescoes that depict scenes from the lives of Saint George, St. Catherine of Alexandria, Saint Lucy, and Jesus Christ. The altar wall displays the Crucifixion, and the barrel-vaulted ceiling is decorated with stars. Largely, this tomb has been lost to time, but it was said to include ten life-sized statues of de' Lupi and his family, two of which are still standing today. Altichiero da Zevio and his associates, including Jacopo d'Avanzi and Sebeto da Verona completed the fresco cycle in 1384; during the Napoleonic Wars, they were whitewashed over until their rediscovery in 1837. As a result, many of them are damaged.

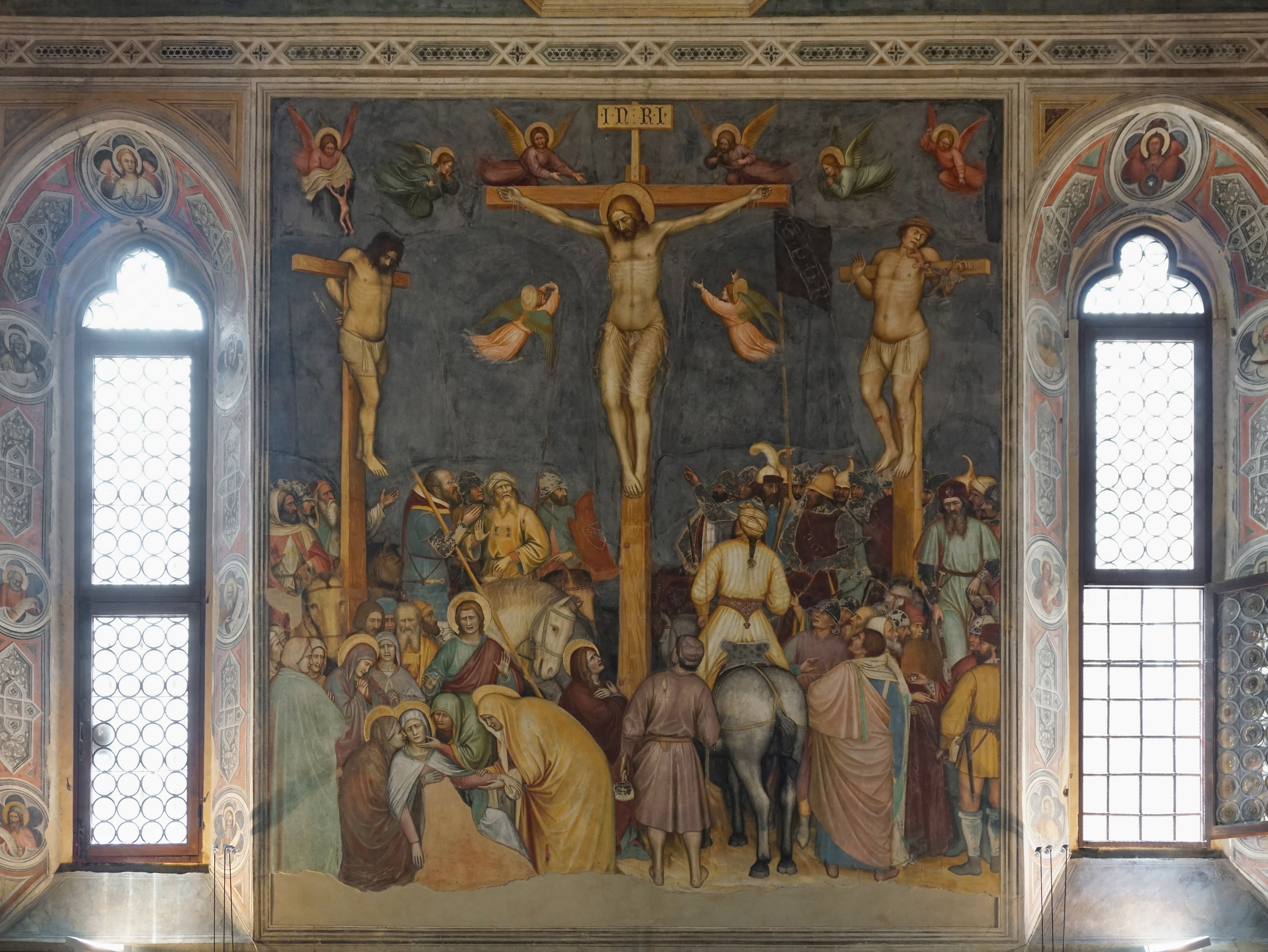
The Crucifixion

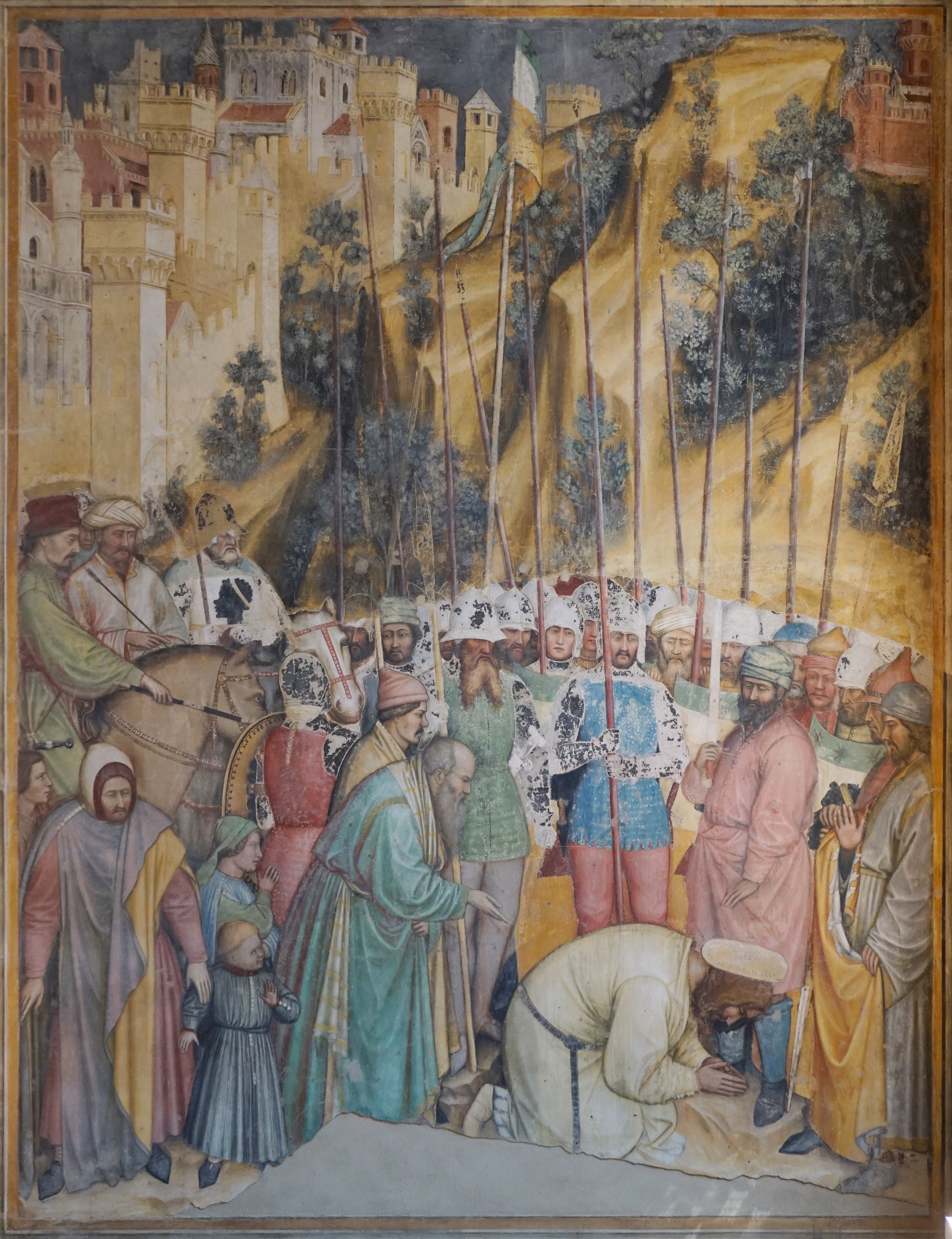
Decapitation of Saint George

== Decoration ==
=== Architecture ===
The façade is made of brick and features three bas-relief statues of St. George, a dragon, and another design featuring a shield. The cathedral itself has a small barrel-vaulted ceiling and a tiled floor. While simple in design, the interior is frescoed with architectural elements such as columns and archways. Many other Renaissance-era cathedrals utilize a similar effect, called quadratura, including the Sistine Chapel, and the method continued to be used into the Baroque and Rococo periods. The illusory artwork serves as a framework for the other interior frescoes, and creates the effect of the ceiling being more intricately designed than it is.

=== Altar wall fresco of the Crucifixion ===
The Crucifixion fresco on the wall above the altar depicts Christ on the cross while Mary weeps below, consoled by apostles and followers. His cross bears a sign reading "INRI," an acronym for the Latin phrase Iēsus Nazarēnus, Rēx Iūdaeōrum ("Jesus the Nazarene, King of the Jews.") Angels surround Christ in the sky, framing him as the central figure, directing the viewer's eye back to him. Altichiero utilizes foreshortening on the flying angels and the grey horse in the foreground to create the illusion of a realistic perspective.

==== Counterfacade frescoes ====
The entry wall depicts scenes from Christ's childhood. The scenes progress top to bottom left to right and are separated into five sections. An Annunciation spans the top of the wall; the scene refers to the event where the angel Gabriel comes to Mary to tell her she will give birth to the son of God. The middle left scene is an Adoration of the Shepherds, when following the birth of Christ where nearby shepherds come to pay homage to the newborn Christ. This scene is often combined with the Adoration of the Magi, but here they are separate, with the latter to the immediate right of the former. The bottom left scene is damaged, but depicts the Flight into Egypt. The story tells of King Herod declaring to kill all infants in his jurisdiction in hopes of killing the Christ-child. In response, the Holy Family fled to Egypt, out of his reach. The final fresco in the bottom right-hand corner is the scene in which Christ is officially inducted into Judaism, known as the Presentation in the Temple.

==== Life of St George ====
The northeast wall is home to seven frescoes, most of which detail the life of Saint George, to whom the Oratory is dedicated. One of the primary frescoes depicts the legend of St. George slaying the dragon. The Saint sits astride a horse with his spear, Ascalon, poised to stab the dragon in the mouth, in order to save the princess in the background. Another shows St. George as he is about to be beheaded for refusing to sacrifice to Roman gods and remaining a Christian. Two other frescoes on the northeast wall detail other legends about the saint: St George Baptizes the King and His Family, and St George Liberated by Angels from Torture on the Wheel.

==== Lives of Saints Catherine of Alexandria and Lucy ====
On the opposite wall from the St. George frescoes are four scenes from the lives of Saint Lucy and Saint Catherine of Alexandria.

St. Catherine is shown in one painting in her martyrdom tied to the breaking wheel that, according to legend, was destroyed at her touch, while an angel flies overhead. Like St. George, St. Catherine is also shown in the moments before she was beheaded for protesting the persecution of Christians. In her fresco, she kneels on the ground with her hands together in prayer. A man stands behind her, sword raised in preparation for the action, and three angels wait above, presumably to receive her. Two more angels stand atop a mountain holding what appears to be the Ark of the Covenant.

The first fresco of St. Lucy shows her standing before a judge after she was reported for swearing to remain a virgin like St. Agatha; the judge orders her to be sent to a brothel, shown in the middle. The far left image shows her tied to a stake on top of a burning pyre. The pyre was lit beneath her when a team of oxen could not move her, though she was allegedly impervious to the flames due to divine intervention. She was later subjected to torture by burning oil and emerged unharmed, but would eventually die from being pierced in the neck by a sword. The other fresco of St. Lucy shows her funeral, attended by a large crowd of people, including several members of the church, such as nuns. In the crowd are Giovanni de' Lupi and Giovanni Dondi, famous doctor and friend of Petrarch. St. Lucy's body lies on an elevated platform in the middle of the scene, while a woman in a black hood prays over her.

== Gallery ==
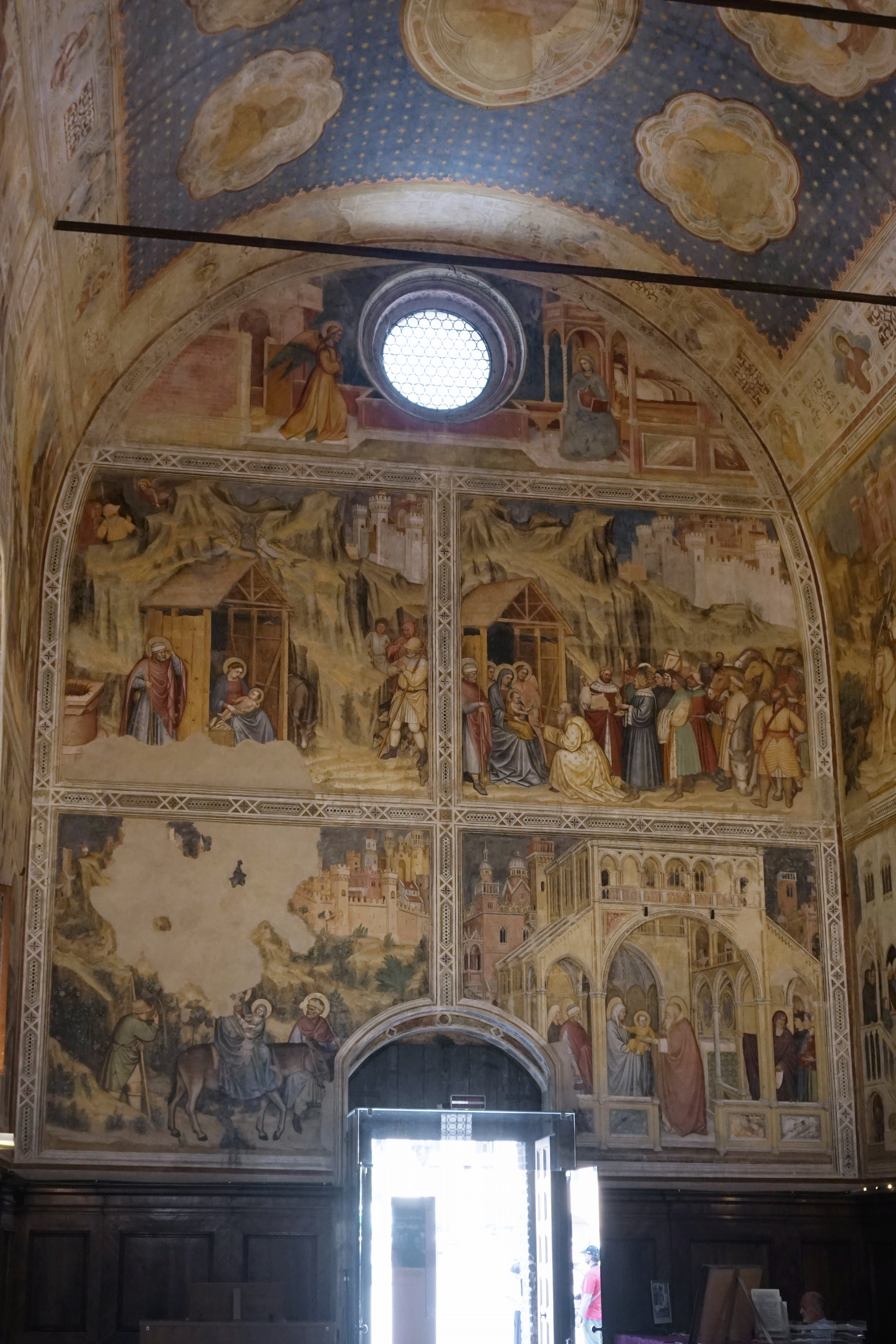
Counterfacade with Scenes of the childhood of Jesus

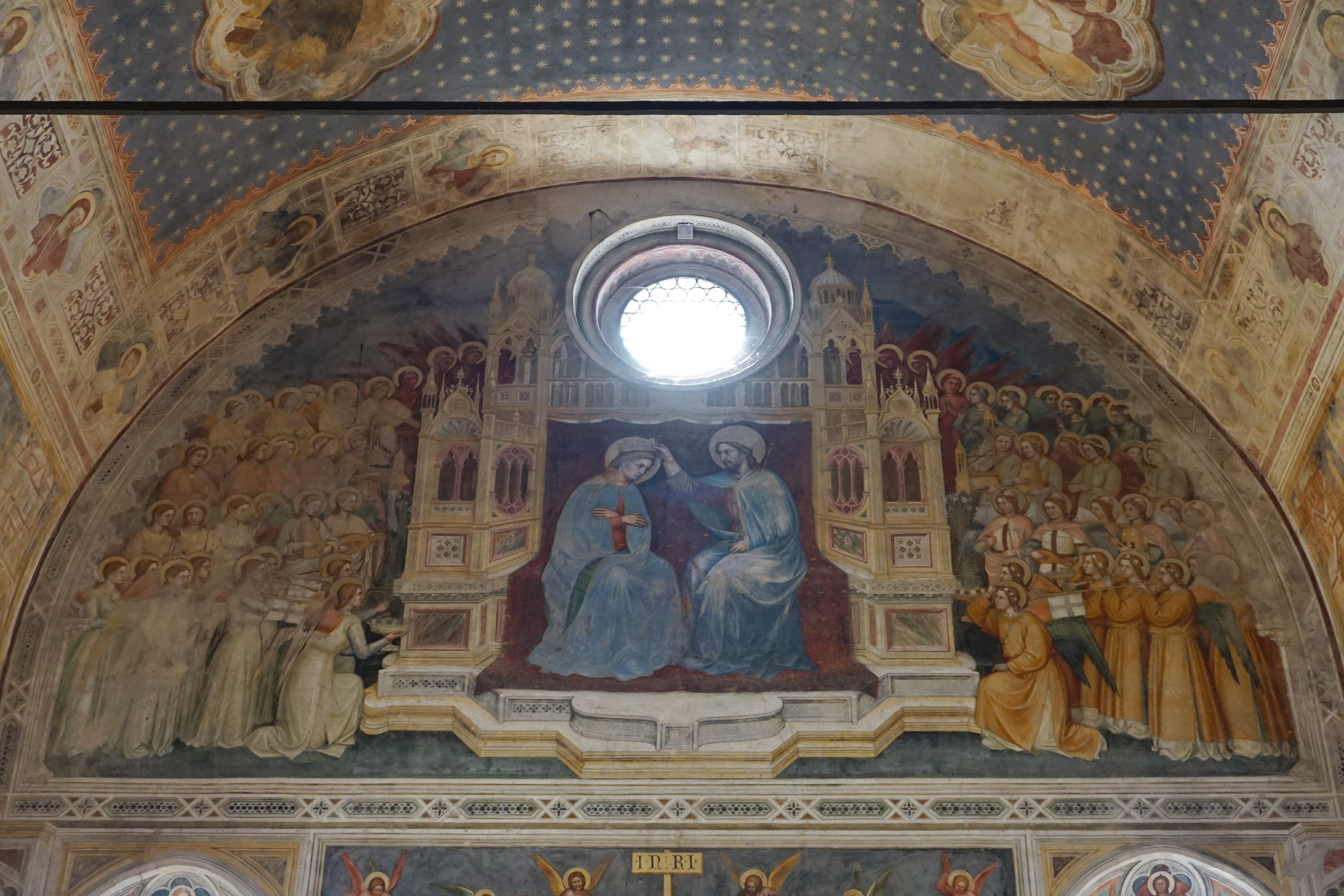
Incoronation of Mary

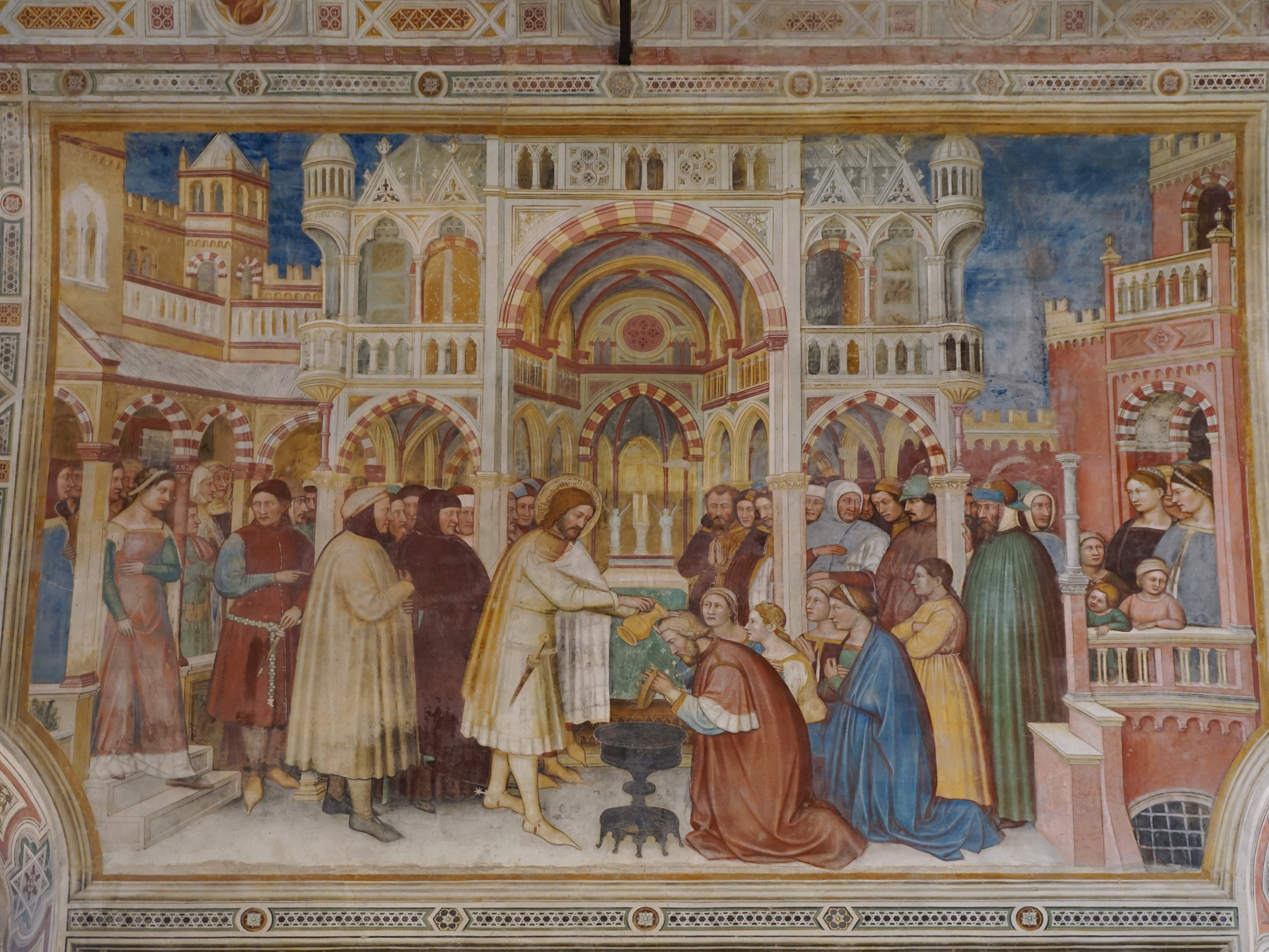
Saint George baptizes the King of Cyrene

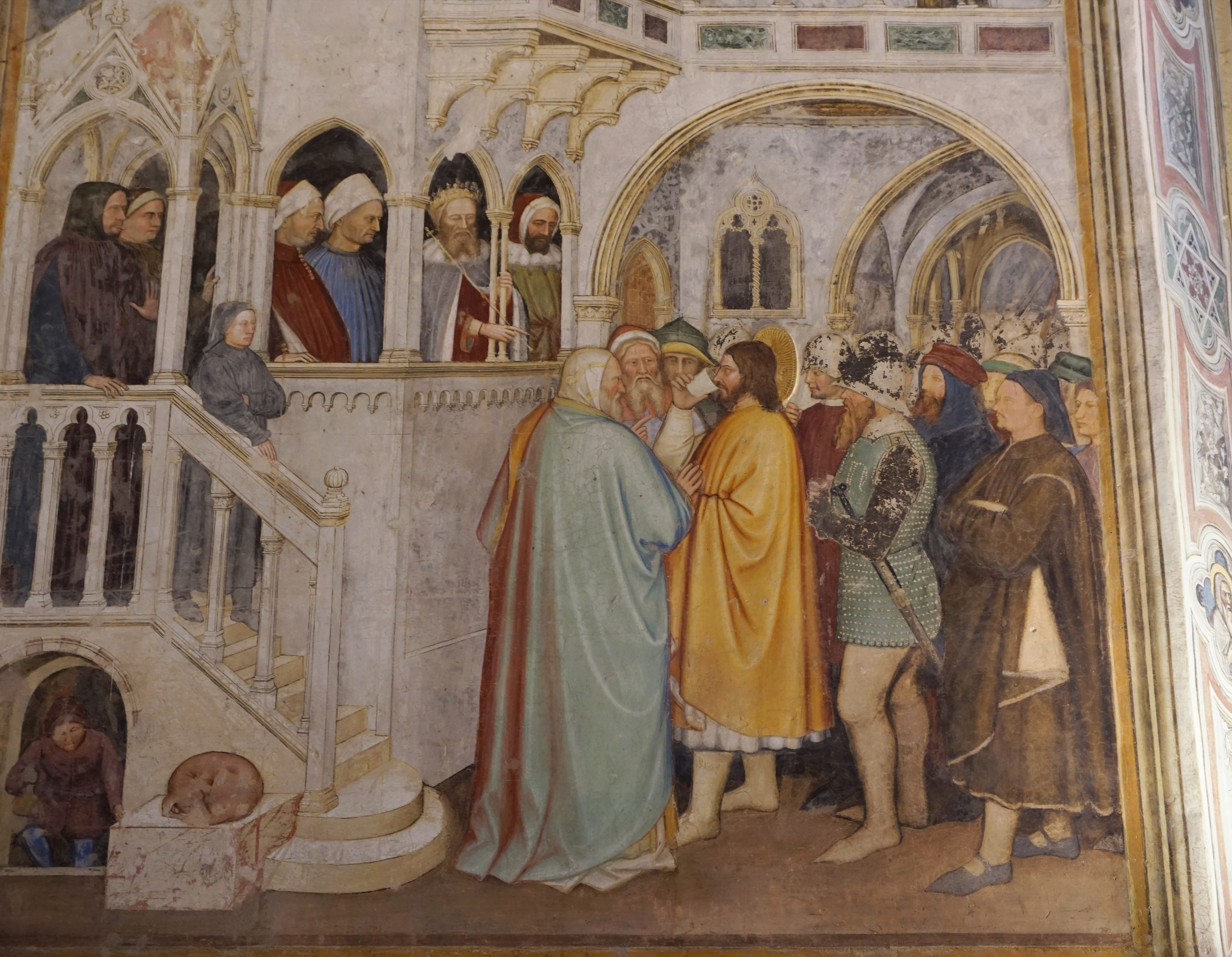
Saint George drinks the poisoned cup but stays alive

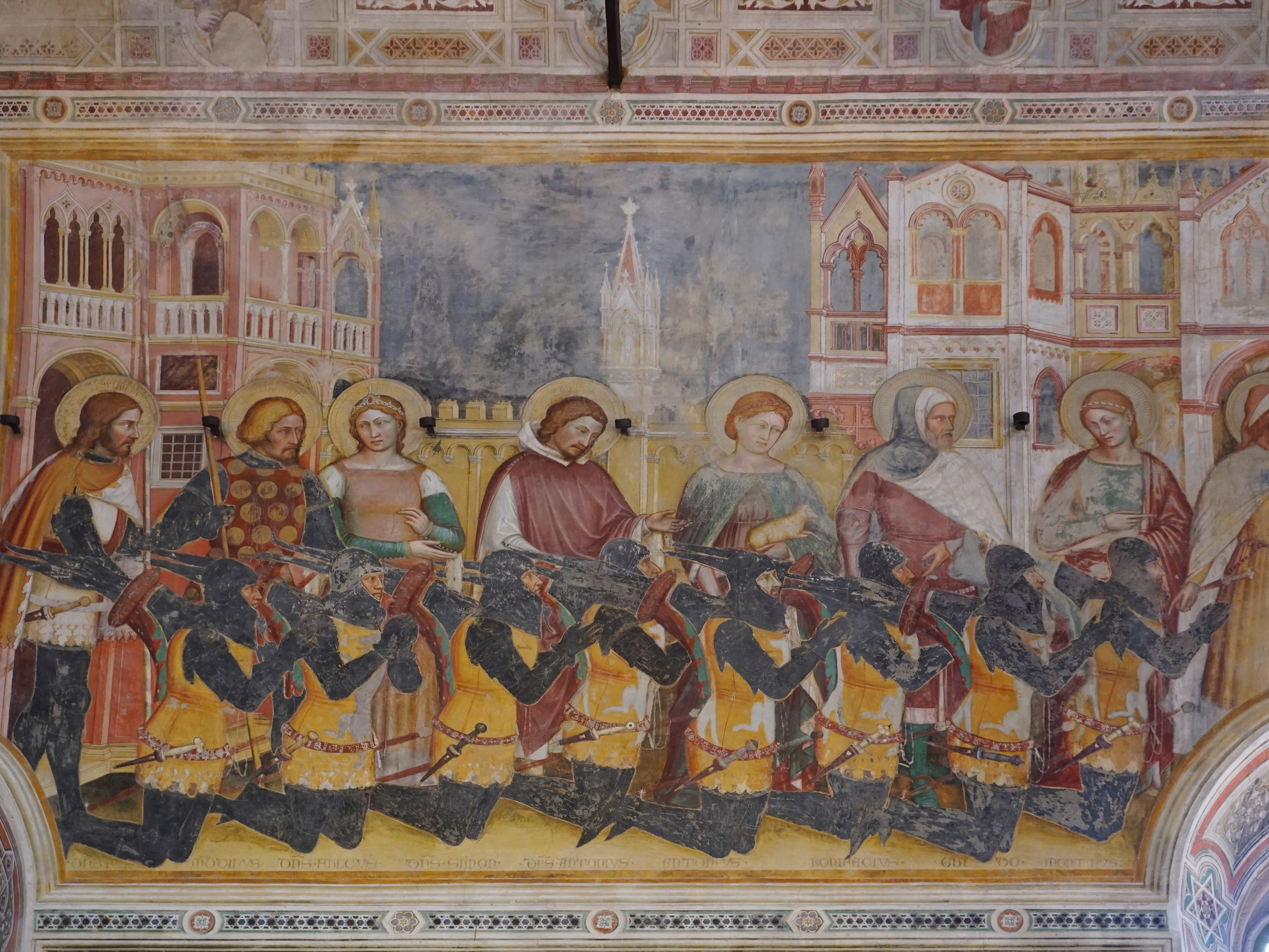
Raimondo Lupi and family kneeling before the Enthroned Madonna and Child (detail)

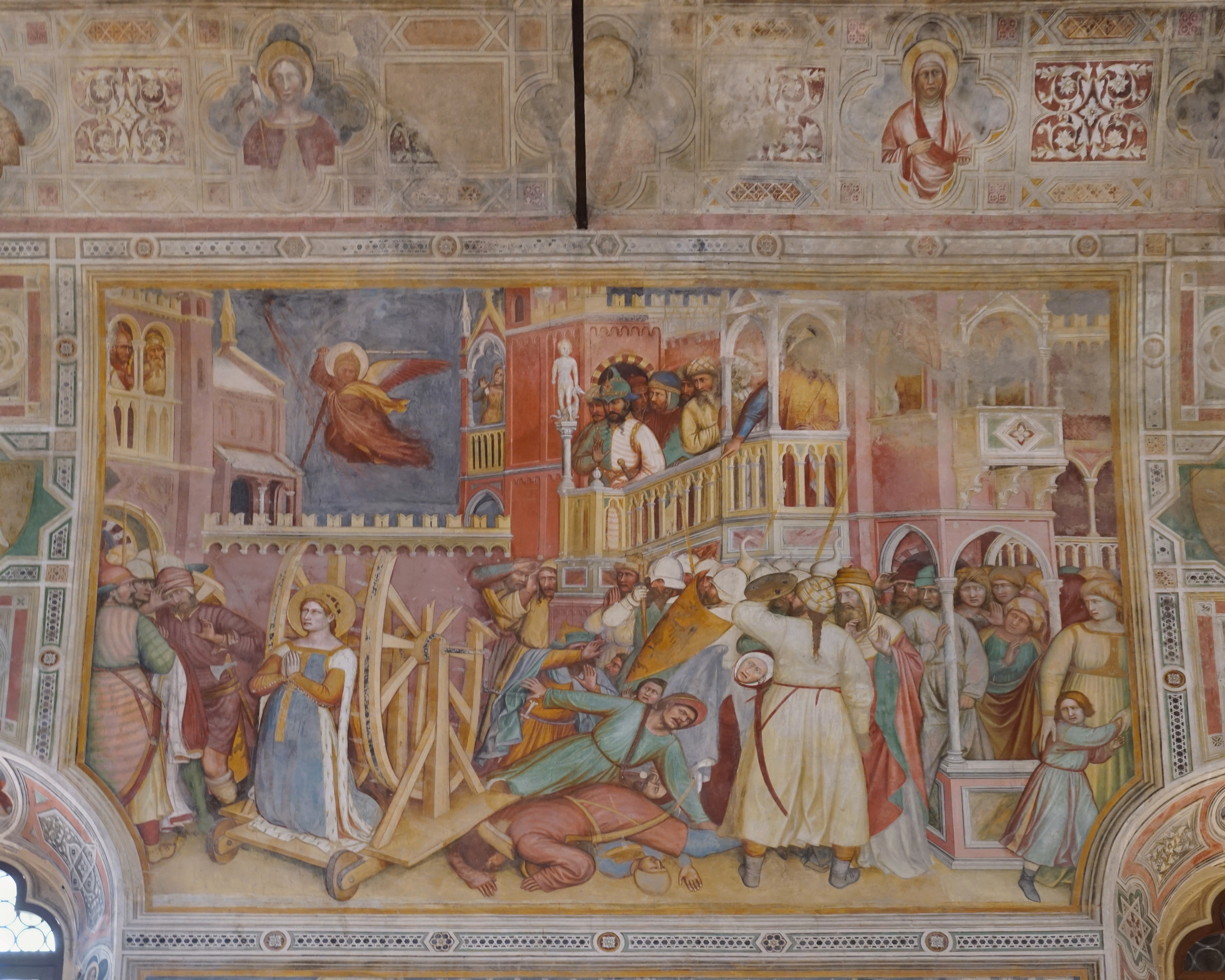
Saint Catherine is rescued by an angel from the martyrdom on the wheel

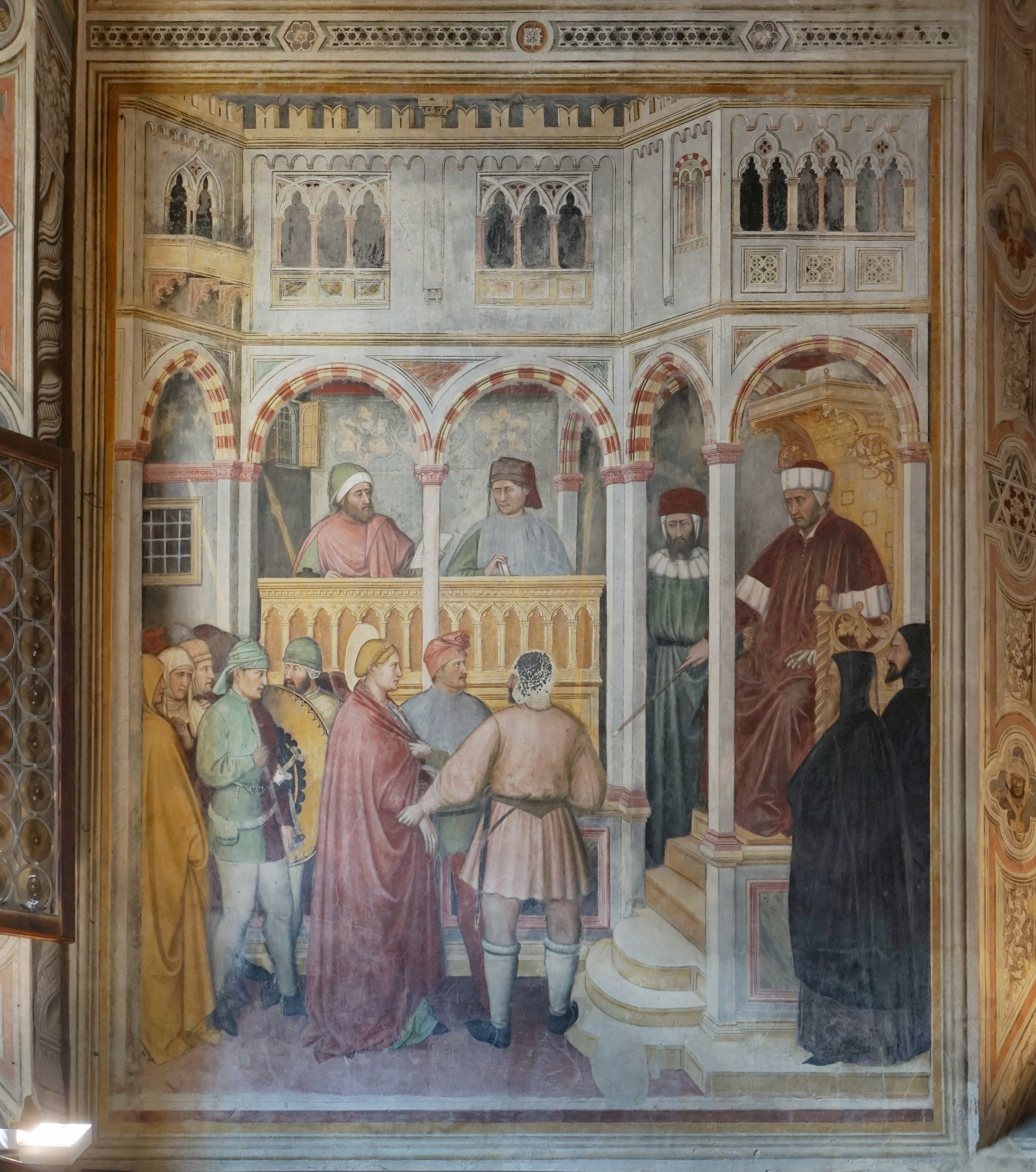
Saint Lucy before the tribunal of Pascasius

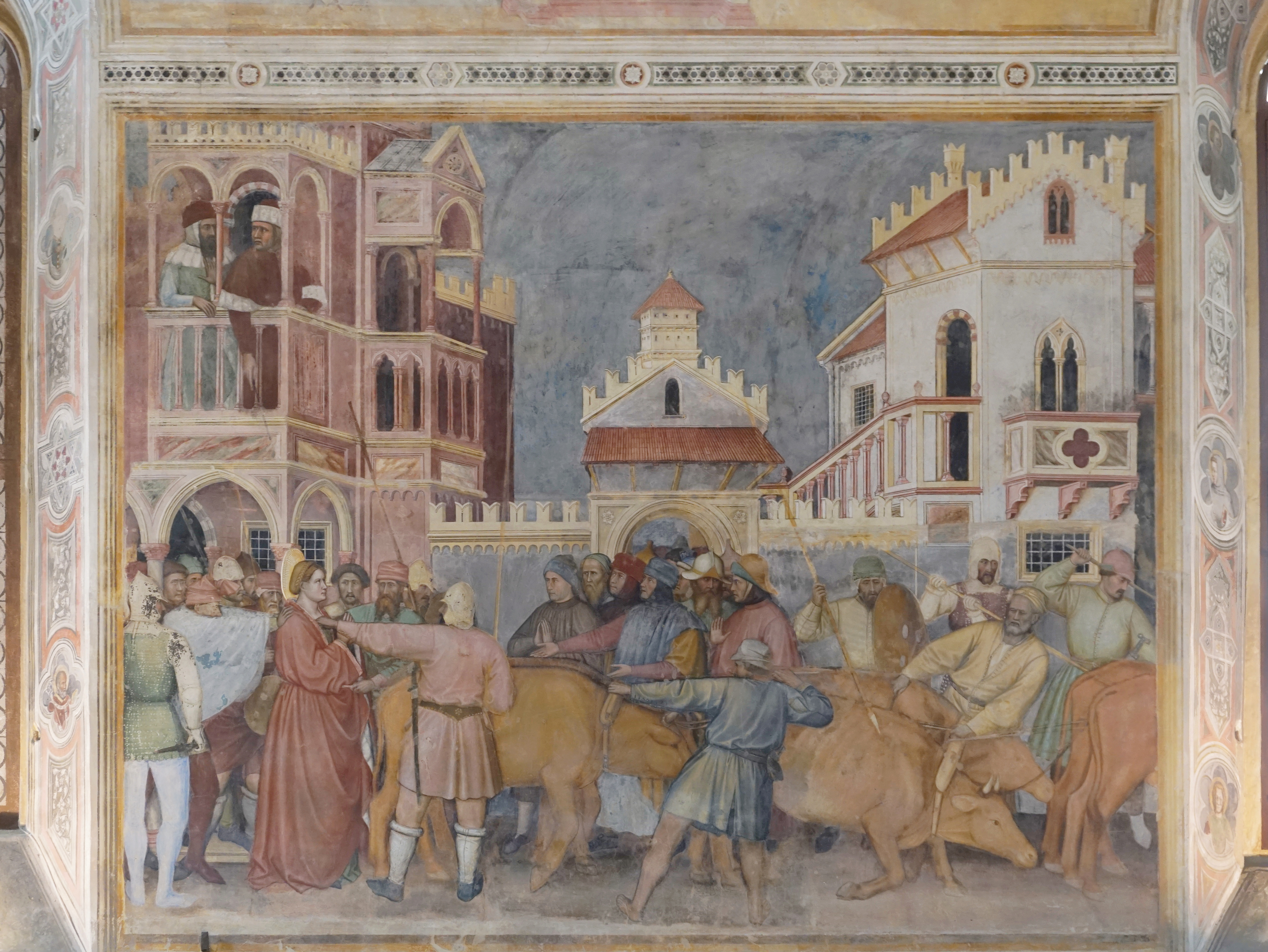
Saint Lucy refuses to be dragged into a brothel

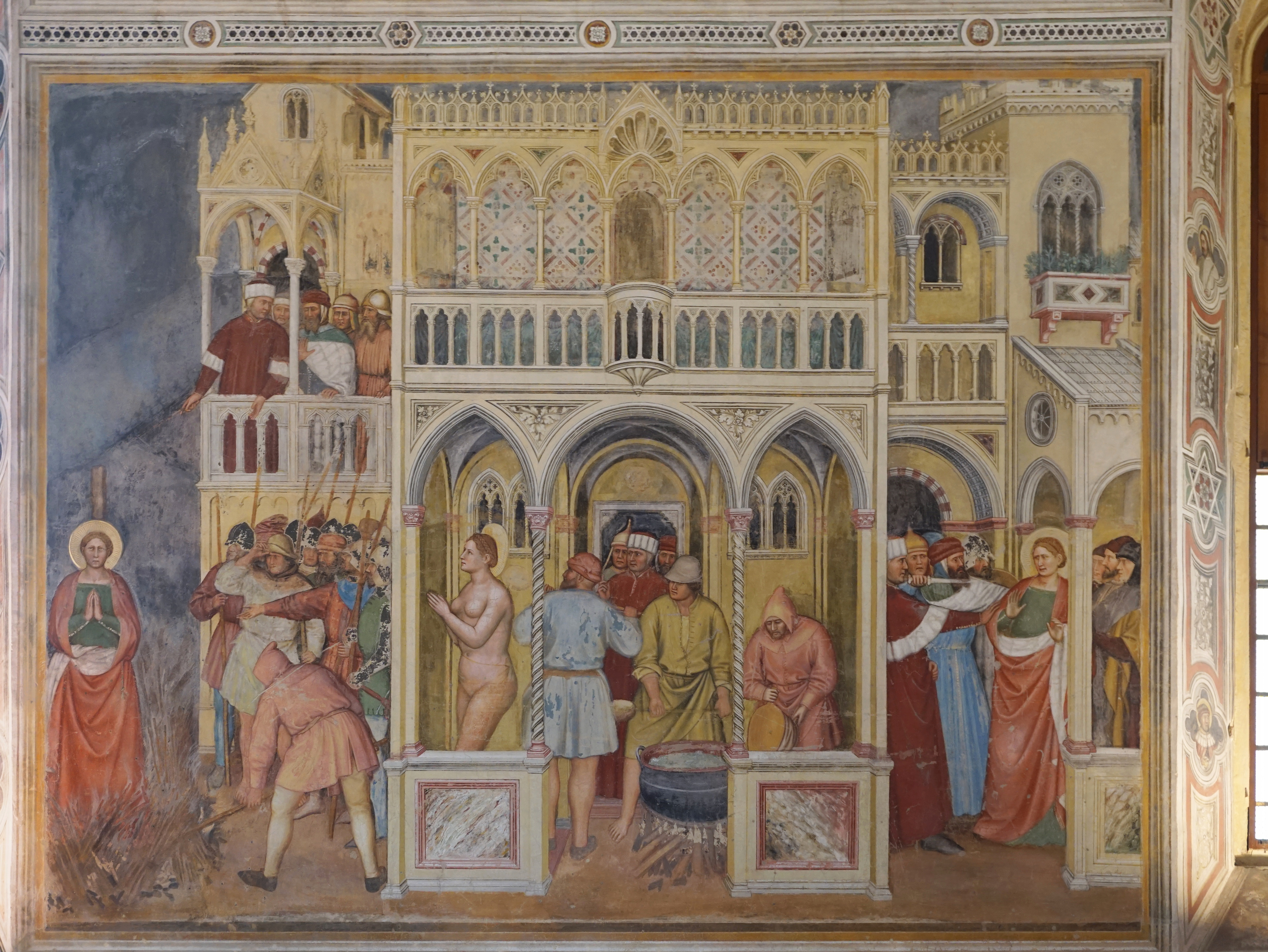
Martyrdom of Saint Lucy

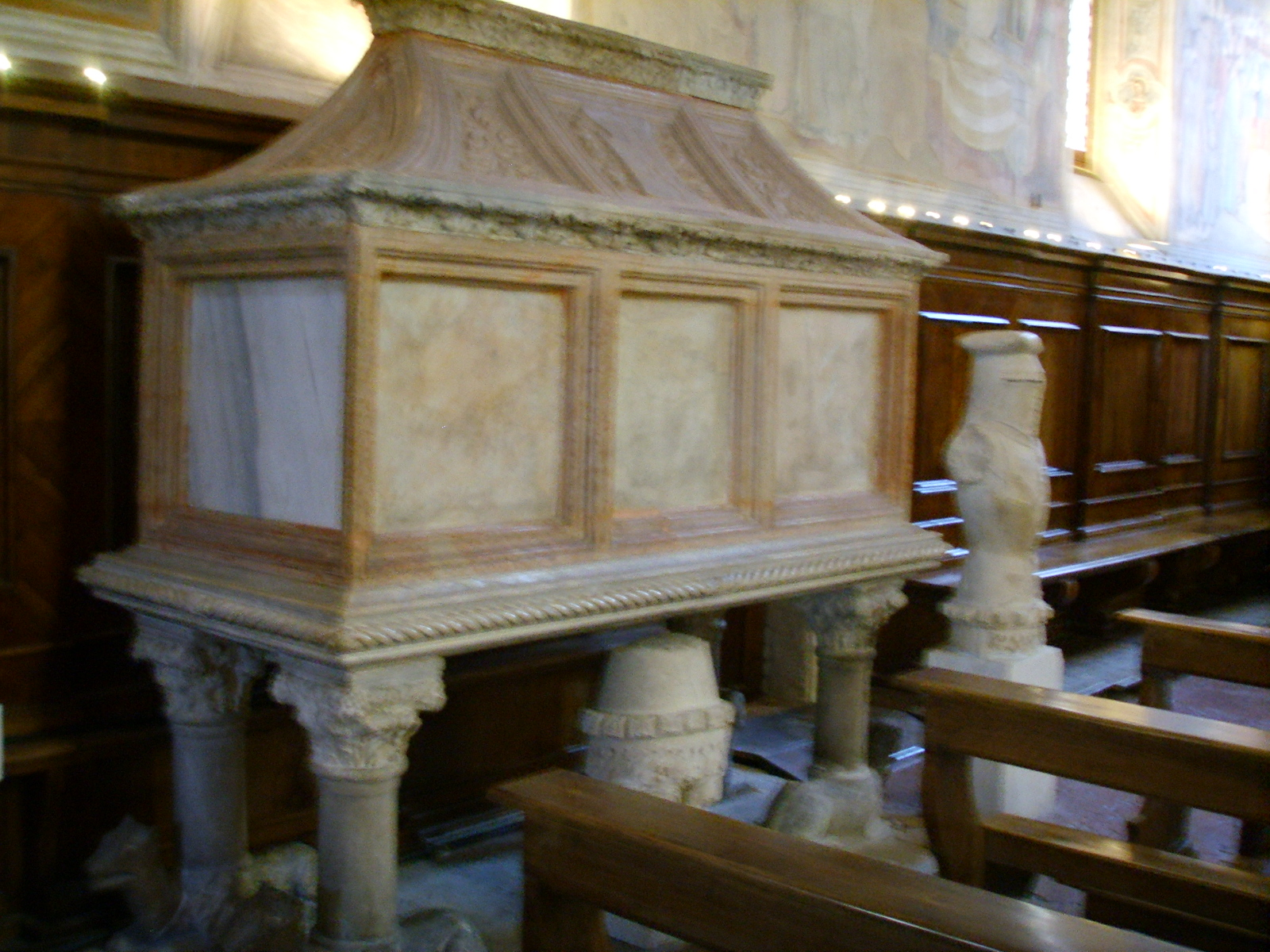
Arca di Raimondino Lupi
