= Vulcan Chaining Prometheus =

Painting by Jean-Charles Frontier

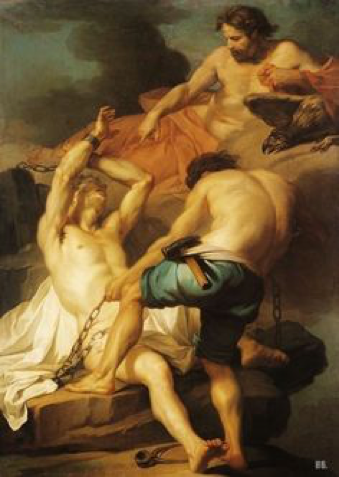
- Artist: Jean-Charles Frontier
- Year: 1744
- Medium: Oil painting
- Dimensions: 202 cm × 145 cm (80 in × 57 in)
- Location: Beaux-Arts de Paris, Paris

Vulcan Chaining Prometheus is a 1744 oil on canvas painting by Jean-Charles Frontier, produced as his reception piece for the Académie Royale de peinture. It shows Jupiter (top right with his eagle) ordering the eternal punishment of Prometheus (bottom left), which Vulcan (bottom right) begins.

Since 1872 it has been in the collection of the Beaux-Arts de Paris, in Paris.
