= Simone dei Crocifissi =

Italian painter

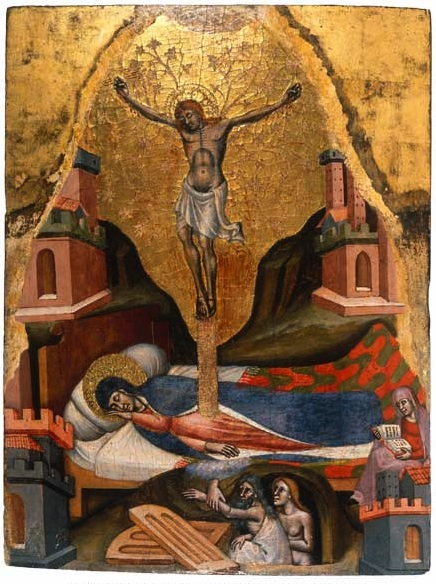
Dream of the Virgin

Simone di Filippo Benvenuti, known as Simone dei Crocifissi or Simone da Bologna (about 1330 - 1399), was an Italian painter. Born and died in Bologna, he painted many religious panel paintings, and also frescoes in the churches of Santo Stefano and San Michele in Bosco, both at Bologna.

== Life ==
Simone dei Crocifissi was born in Bologna. He was son of the shoemaker Filippo di Benvenuto. In the 17th century he was renamed "of the Crucifixes" (dei Crocifissi) for his "ability to paint great images of the Redeemer, for our sake nailed to the cross" (Malvasia). He trained with Franco Bolognese.

He was active as a painter at Bologna from 1354 to 1399 in the wake of Vitale da Bologna's previous experience, which he engaged in a robustly more popular style of painting.

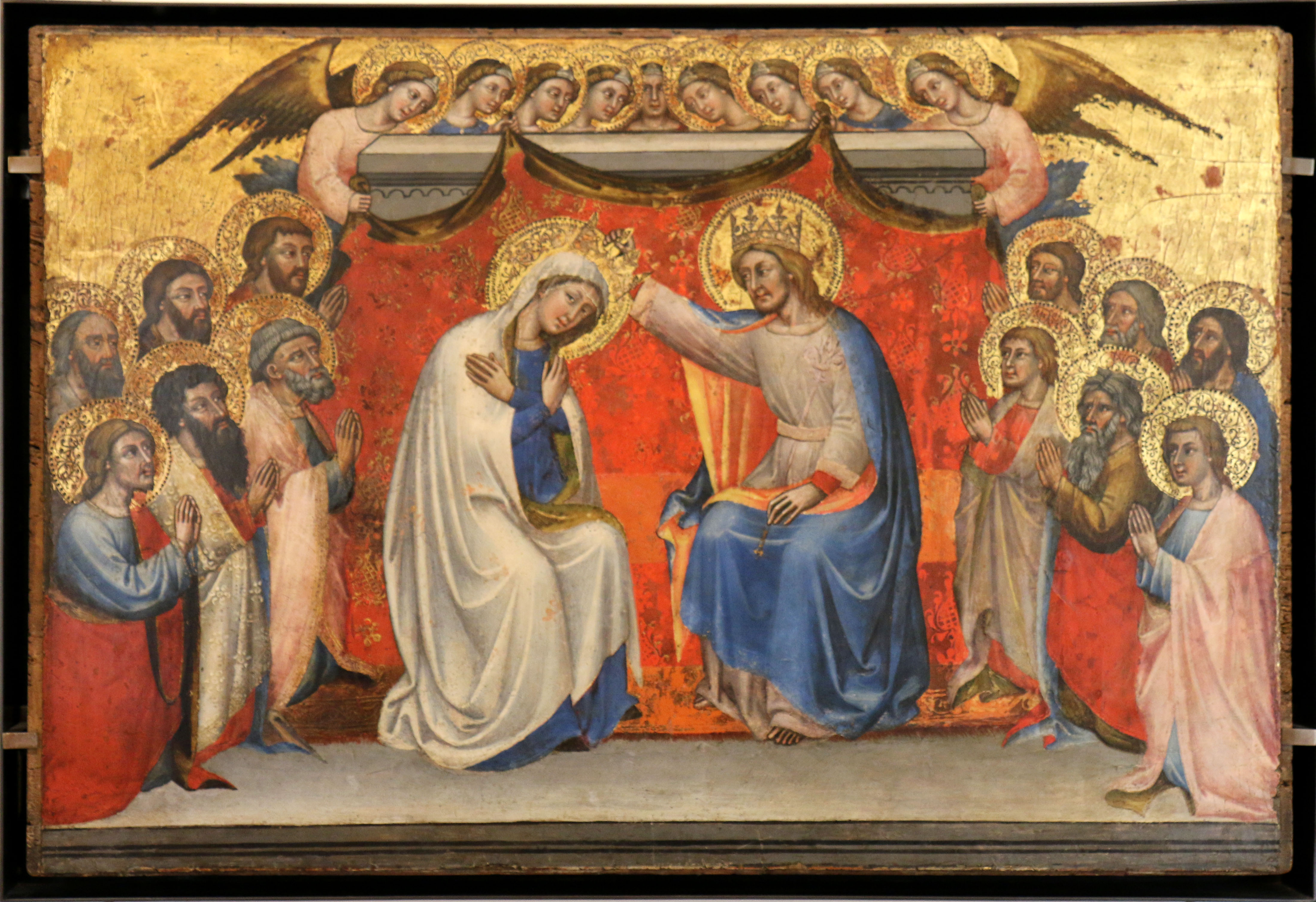
Coronation of the Virgin

The initial artistic phase of Simone Di Fillipo can be seen via the frescoes of the life of Christ that come from the church of Santa Maria di Mezzaratta (mid-1350s), now preserved in the National Art Gallery of Bologna (Pinacoteca di Bologna), where the interest for Giotto's space and plastic solutions is interpreted with a sharp expressivity.

The influence on Simone of Vitale's painting style can be caught in works such as the polyptych 474, also preserved at the Pinacoteca. On the other hand, works like the Pietà by (1368), and the Crucifix of St. James (1370), on display in the same museum, highlight the influence of Jacopo Avanzi and his solemn style, even if re-interpreted stressing the devotional goal, as in the Madonna by Giovanni da Piacenza (1382). These are the characteristics that enabled Simone dei Crocifisso to reach a leading position in Bologna soon afterwards, gaining pre-eminence as the author of wooden altarpieces for local churches and for individual customers such as Nativity.

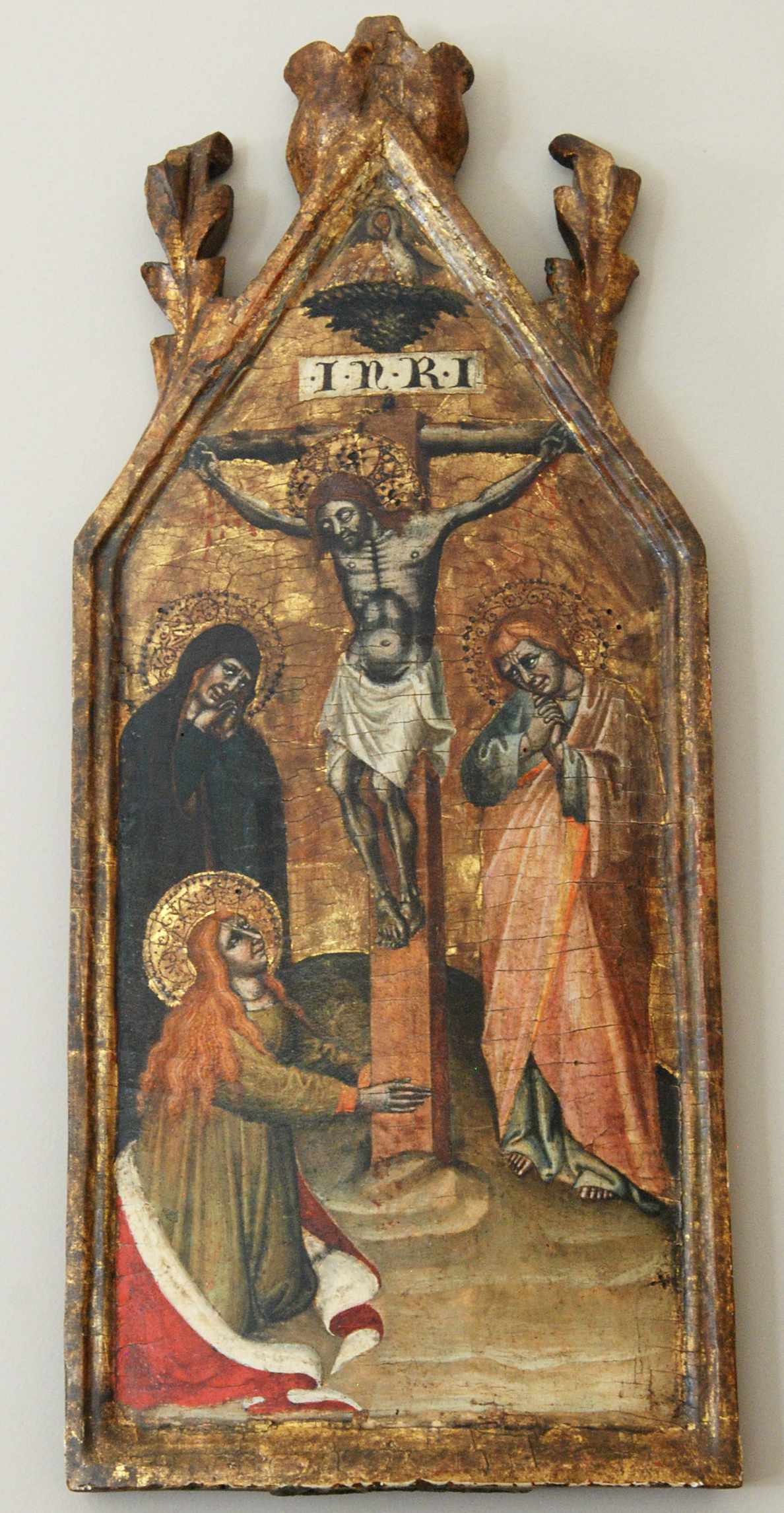
Crucifixion.
