= Sebeto da Verona =

Italian painter

Sebeto da Verona is a late 14th-century Italian painter, active in both Verona and Padua. Little is known about his biography. The name Sebeto is first bandied by Giorgio Vasari in his Lives of the Painters, however some sources claim the name is derived from De Jebeto, a vulgarization of da Zevio. They claim that such a painter was a pupil of either Francesco Squarcione or Liberale da Verona.

Circa 1376, he painted a chapel of San Giorgio in Padua along with Jacopo d'Avanzi and Altichiero da Zevio. All three also painted in Verona in various palaces.
