= Nativity (Lanfranco) =

Painting by Giovanni Lanfranco

Nativity or Notte (Night) or Adoration of the Shepherds)
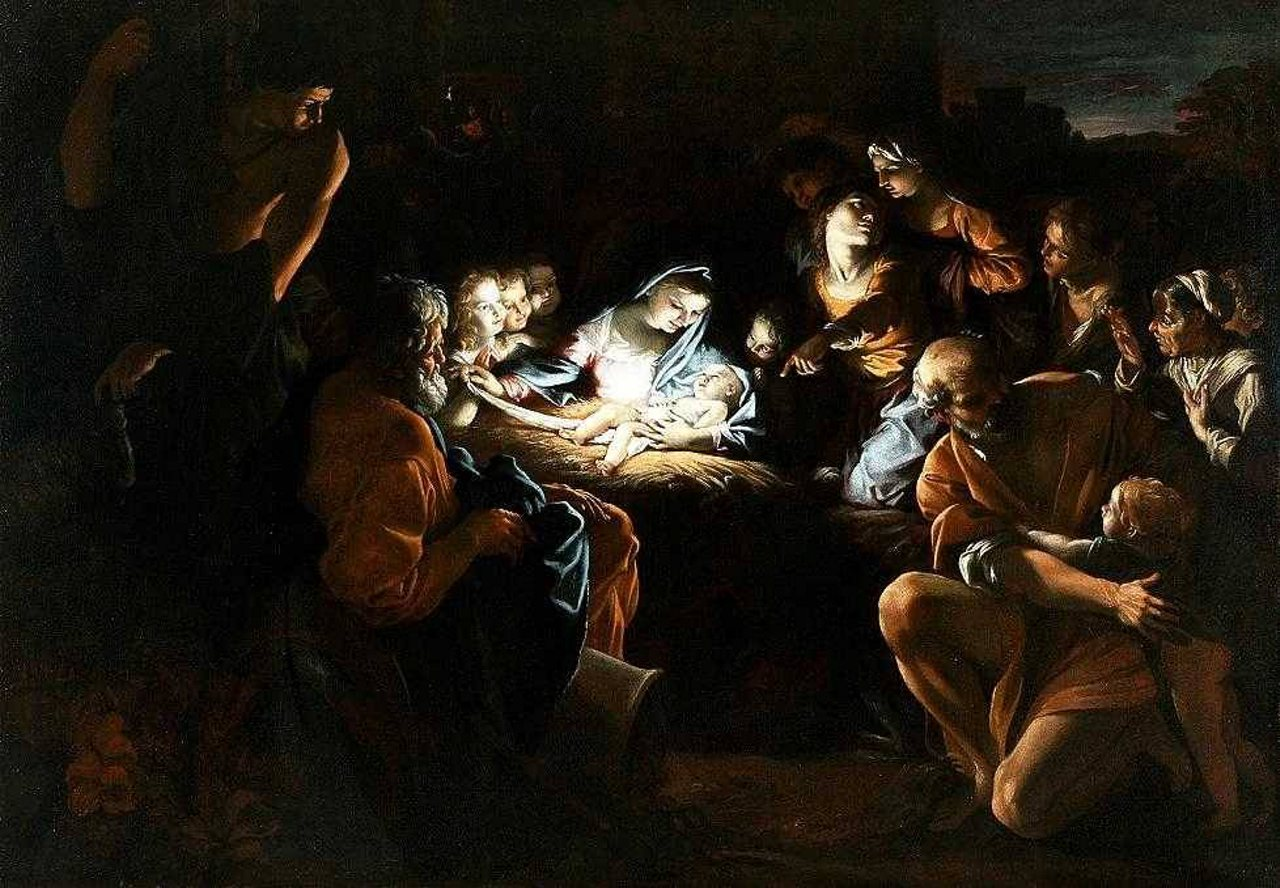
- Artist: Giovanni Lanfranco
- Year: c. 1606-1607
- Medium: Oil on canvas
- Dimensions: 256.5 cm × 188 cm (101.0 in × 74 in)
- Location: Alnwick Castle; Alnwick, England

The Nativity or Adoration of the Shepherds) is an oil on canvas painting created around 1606–1607 by the Italian painter Giovanni Lanfranco. It is now in Alnwick Castle, England.

== Description ==
The Nativity painting illustrates a nocturnal scene, wherein the splendorous newborn Jesus lies in his mother's arms, and illuminates up the surrounding faces of adoring shepherds, men and women, and children. The elder man at the right base is presumed to be Joseph, the husband of Mary. Similar luministic arrangements of this or a similar subject had been painted previously by Correggio and Barocci.

It is likely the painting was acquired as part of the ‘Camuccini Collection’, 74 paintings acquired by Algernon Percy, 4th Duke of Northumberland, from Rome in 1856.
