= Navidad =

Navidad is the Spanish word for Christmas. It may also refer to:

== Places ==
- Navidad, Chile, a commune in Cardenal Caro Province, O'Higgins Region, Chile
- Navidad Formation, a geological formation in Chile
- La Navidad, a settlement in what is now Haiti
- Barra de Navidad, town in the Mexican state of Jalisco
- Navidad Lake, Bolivian lake
- Navidad Bank, submerged bank in the Atlantic Ocean
- Navidad River, coastal river in the U.S. state of Texas
- Navidad mine, a large silver mine in Argentina

== People with the surname ==
- Patricia Navidad (born 1973), Mexican singer and actress

== Arts and entertainment ==
=== Film ===
- Navidad, 2009 film by Sebastián Lelio

=== Music ===
- Navidad, oratorio by Eduardo Sánchez de Fuentes
- Navidad (Jaci Velasquez album) (2001), Spanish Christmas album by Jaci Velasquez
- Navidad (Lara & Reyes album) (2000), album released by Lara & Reyes
- Navidad (Rojo EP) (2006), Christmas music EP by the Mexican Christian rock band Rojo
- Navidades, a 2006 album by Luis Miguel
- "Navidad", a 1989 song by José Luis Perales

=== Other uses in arts and entertainment ===
- Navidad, the fourteenth and penultimate episode of the Aquí está la Chilindrina series
- Navidad sin fin, a 2001 Mexican telenovela produced by Eugenio Cobo for Televisa

== Other uses ==
- Navidad virus, a mass-mailing worm program or virus

== See also ==
- Nativity (disambiguation)
- Feliz Navidad (disambiguation)
