= The Nativity (Frontier) =

Painting by Jean-Charles Frontier

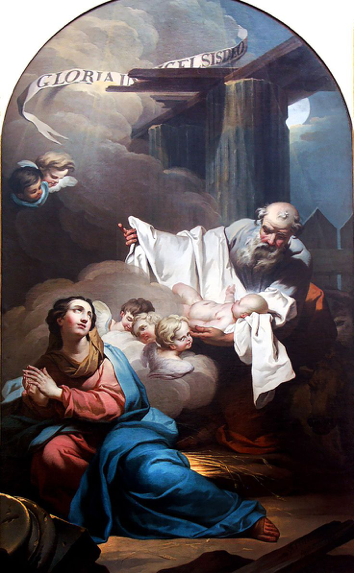

The Nativity is a 1743 oil on canvas painting by Jean-Charles Frontier, probably commissioned by the Chartreux in Lyon and the Chartreuse du Lys Saint-Esprit. It was received in 1744 at the Académie royale de peinture et de sculpture, exhibited at the Paris Salon the following year, and delivered to Lyon on 25 October 1746, contributing to Frontier's move to Lyon.

The white cloth at the centre brings to mind a priest's vestments (showing that Christ is prophet, priest and king) and the grave-clothes in which the dead adult Christ would be wrapped. Beams of light illuminate both Mary and Joseph, with the figure of the latter being highly influenced by Noël Hallé. The work is now in the musée de Grenoble.

== Bibliography (in French) ==
- Ministère de la Culture et de la Communication Éditions de la Réunion des musées nationaux Paris, 1987
- Archives départementales de Lyon, 17 n °82
- Abbé J.B. Vanel, Histoire des églises et chapelles de Lyon, Lyon, 1908
