= Nativity (Simone dei Crocifissi) =

Painting by Simone dei Crocifissi

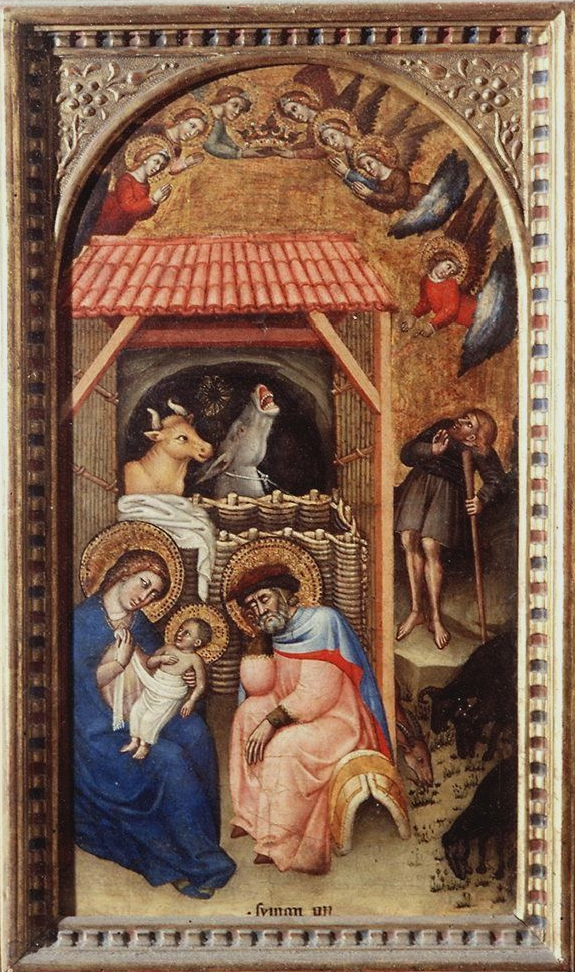
Nativity (c. 1380) by Simone de Crocifissi

Nativity is a c.1380 tempera and gold on panel painting by Simone dei Crocifissi, now the only 14th century Bolognese work in the Uffizi in Florence. It is signed "Simon" and – stylistically close to another Nativity (Davia Bargellini Collection, Bologna) – it belongs to the painter's mature period.
