= Jean-Charles Frontier =

French painter

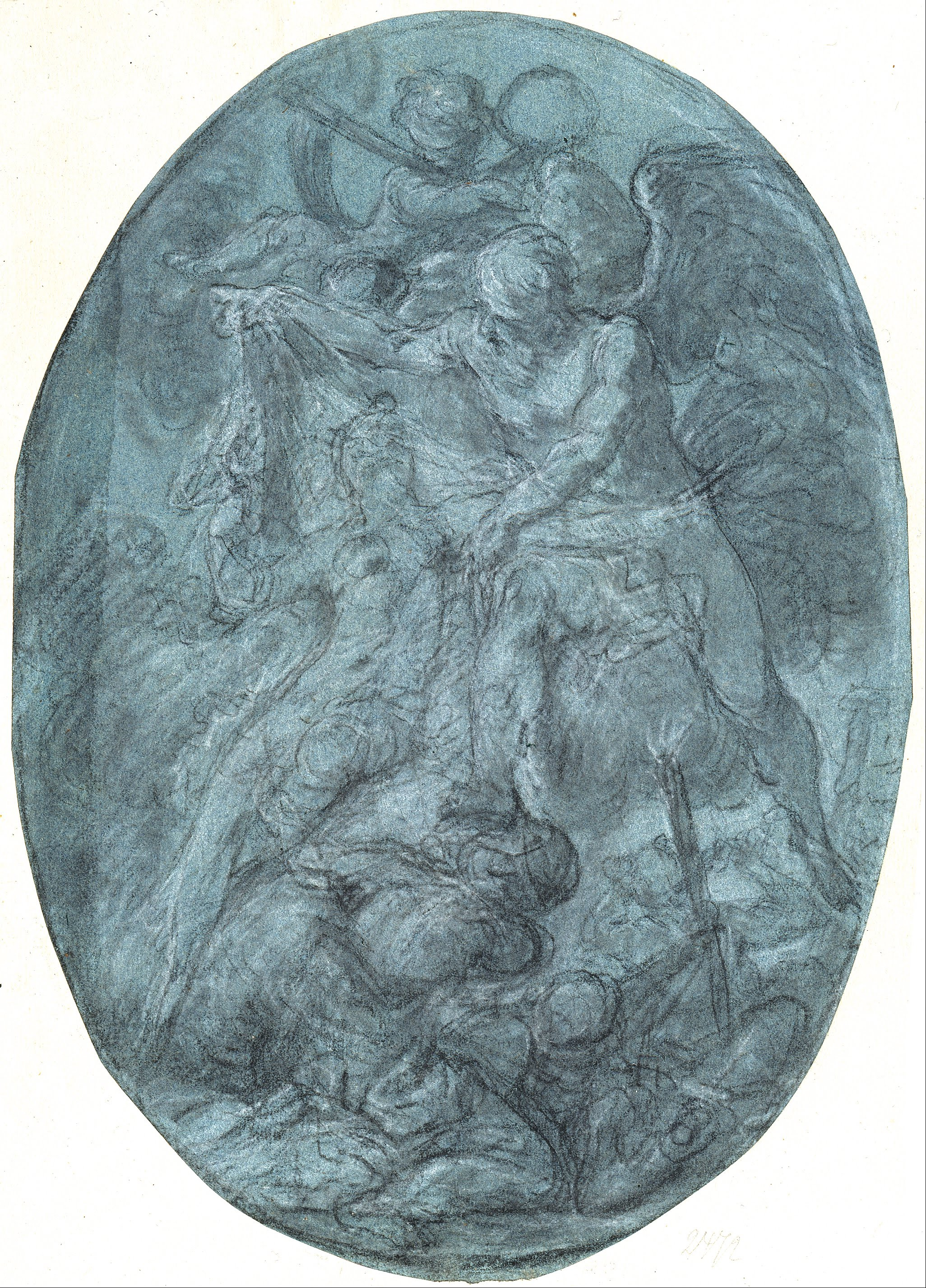
Time Unveils the Truth, black and white chalk drawing from 1755, now in the Museum Kunstpalast

Jean-Charles Frontier was born in Paris in 1701. He was a pupil of Claude-Guy Hallé, and took the first prize at the Academy in 1728, with a picture of Ezekiel abolishing Idolatry and establishing the Worship of the true God. His works also include the 1743 The Nativity. He was received as an academician in 1744, with the picture Prometheus bound on Caucasus, now in the Louvre. He exhibited at the Salon from 1743 to 1761, and became director of the Academy of Lyon, where he died in 1763.
