= Altichiero =

Italian painter (c. 1330–c. 1390)

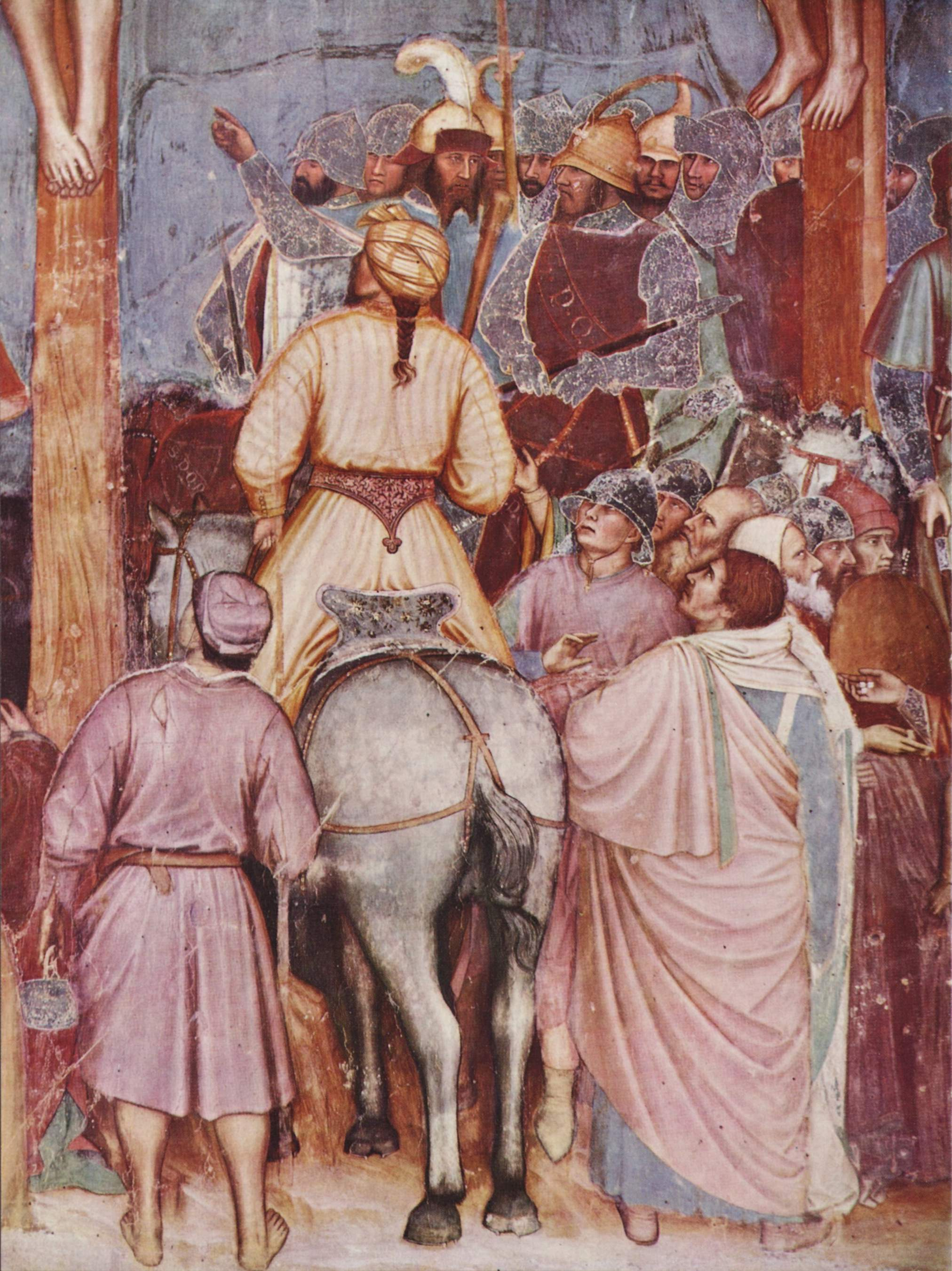
Detail from Crucifixion, a fresco in the Oratorio di San Giorgio of Padua

Altichiero da Zevio (c. 1330 – c. 1390), also called Aldighieri da Zevio, was an Italian painter much influenced by Giotto, certainly through knowledge of the frescoes in the Cappella degli Scrovegni in Padua and quite possibly through having been trained in Florence by one of Giotto's pupils. Altichiero worked in Verona and Padua. Works by him survive in the church of Sant'Anastasia in Verona and in the Cappella di S Felice (originally Cappella di S Giacomo) in the basilica of Sant'Antonio (Il Santo) and the Oratorio di San Giorgio in Padua. His stature was compromised for a long time through his supposed collaboration with a certain Jacopo Avanzo or Avanzi, but study of the documents and historiography demonstrated Atichiero's authorship of the frescoes in both the Santo and the Oratorio di San Giorgio. It has been argued that the hand of an assistant (conceivably Jacopo Avanzo or Jacopo Avanzi, both Bolognese painters) can be seen in some early scenes in the Santo (Cappella di S Felice, originally the Cappella di S Giacomo) – although it was certainly Altichiero who was paid to decorate the chapel, and he received 792 ducats in the summer of 1379.

Altichiero was probably born somewhere near Zevio. He became an important member of the della Scala household in Verona, and around 1364 painted a series of frescoes based upon Flavius Josephus's The Wars of the Jews at the della Scala palace of Sala del Podestà.

The last record of Altichiero is a Paduan archival document of September 1384. At that time he was in Verona or about to go there. The Florentine art historian Giorgio Vasari is the source of the tradition that Altichiero returned to Verona after working in Padua.

== Secondary Sources ==
- Farquhar, Maria (1855). Ralph Nicholson Wornum (ed.). Biographical catalogue of the principal Italian painters. London: Woodfall & Kinder. p. 234.
