= Jacopo d'Avanzi =

Italian painter

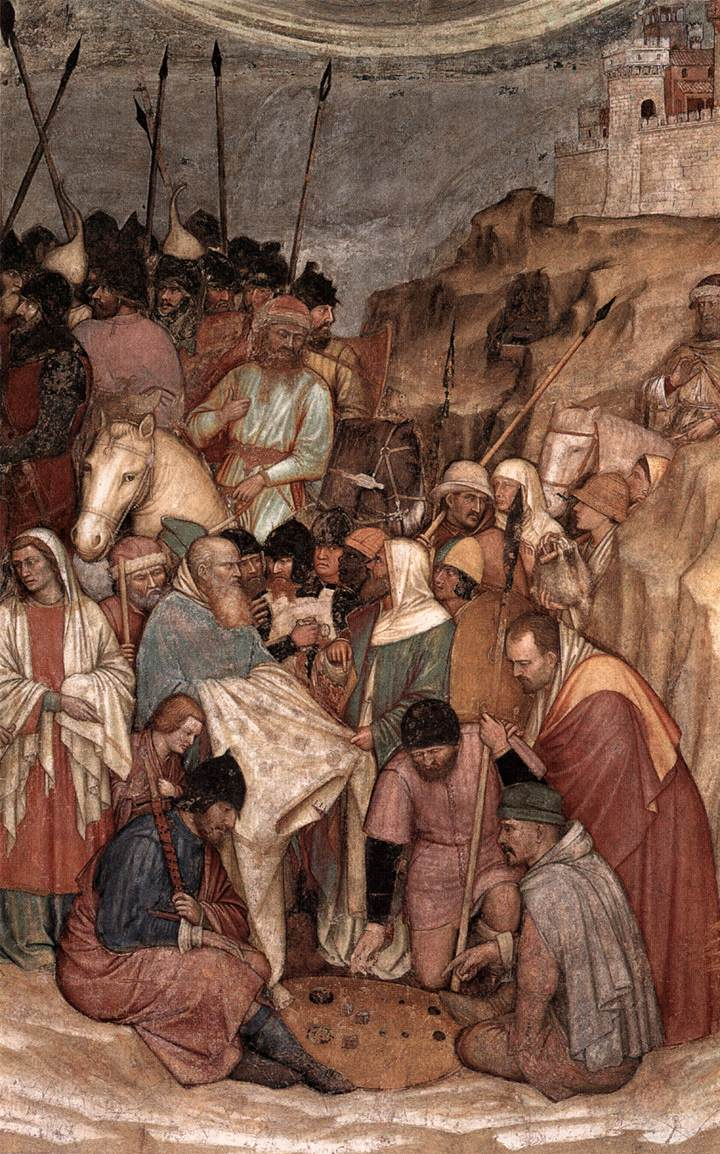
Detail of Crucifixion Fresco in Chapel of San Giacomo in Padua

Jacopo d'Avanzi (after 1350s – 1416) was an Italian painter of the Renaissance period. He is also known as Jacopo Avanzi or Jacopo de Avanzi, although apparently often confused with other artists, including Jacopo de' Bavozi and the Vicentine Avanzo.

== Biography ==
Born in Bologna, he trained supposedly with Vitale da Bologna. He worked with Galasso Galassi of Ferrara and Cristofano of Bologna in the old church of Santa Apollonia di Mezzaratta; these frescoes are now in the Pinacoteca Nazionale of Bologna.

He also completed the series of frescoes in the chapel of San Giacomo in the Basilica di Sant'Antonio at Padua, which were painted in 1376, completed later by Altichiero da Zevio and Sebeto da Verona. All three also painted in Verona.
