= Westclox =

Former clock manufacturer

Westclox Company
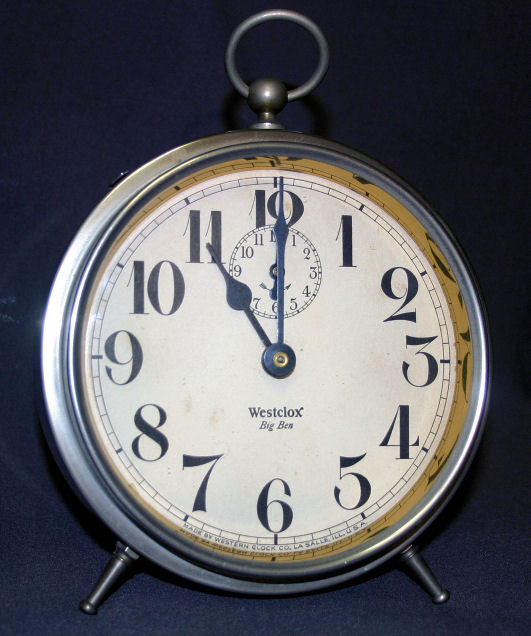
- A Westclox "Big Ben" alarm clock
- Formerly: United Clock Company; Western Clock Company; Western Clock Manufacturing Company (1888–1919); Western Clock Co., Ltd. (1919-1931) merged to become General Time Corporation
- Headquarters: 320 5th Street, Peru, Illinois, United States
- Westclox Manufacturing Plant Historic District
- U.S. National Register of Historic Places
- U.S. Historic district
- Nearest city: Peru, Illinois
- Area: 25 acres (10 ha)
- Architect: Matteson, Victor Andre
- Architectural style: Early Commercial
- NRHP reference No.: 07000475
- Added to NRHP: June 1, 2007
- Website: nylholdings.com

Westclox is an American brand of clocks and alarm clocks owned by NYL Holdings LLC. The company's historic plant is located in Peru, Illinois. The Westclox Manufacturing Plant Historic District was added to the National Register of Historic Places in LaSalle County, Illinois, in 2007.

== Early history as United Clock Company ==
Charles Stahlberg and others from Waterbury, Connecticut, formed the "United Clock Company" in 1885, in Peru, Illinois, intending to manufacture clocks based on a technological innovation by Stahlberg. Stahlberg patented this innovation on September 22, 1885, (US patent #326,602) which involved the use of molded lead alloy movement plates with inset brass bushings as well as lead alloy gear assemblies.

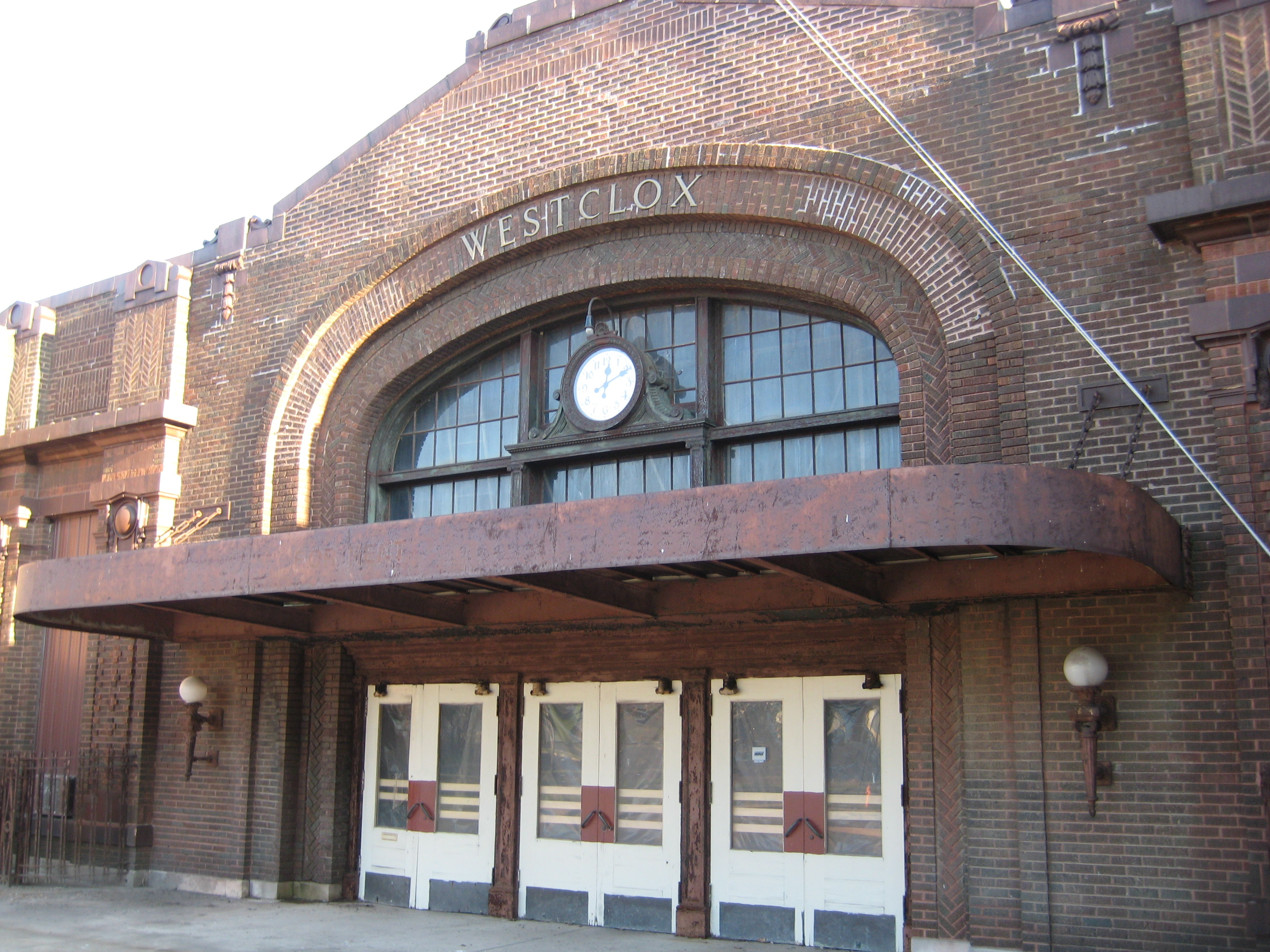
The main entrance Westclox building in Peru, Illinois

== Bankruptcies, reorganizations, and mergers ==
In 1887, the company reorganized under the new name Western Clock Company and again went bankrupt, and F. W. Matthiessen reorganized it in 1888 as the Western Clock Manufacturing Company. In 1908, the company received a patent for the "Big Ben" alarm clock movement. This movement has a "bell-back" design, meaning that the bell mechanism is integral to the clock's case. The company first brought the Big Ben to market in 1909. The company's name was shortened to "Western Clock Company" in 1912. In 1910, the Big Ben became the first alarm clock advertised nationally, with ads placed in the Saturday Evening Post.

The modern trademark of the company, "Westclox," first appeared on the back of Big Ben alarm clocks from 1910 to 1917. The name appeared on Big Ben dials as early as 1911. The company officially registered this trademark on January 18, 1916.

In 1919, Western Clock Co., Ltd., was incorporated. Twelve years later, in 1931, the company merged with the Seth Thomas Clock Company, with both companies becoming divisions of General Time Corporation. The Westclox unit became known as "Westclox Division of General Time Corporation" in 1936.

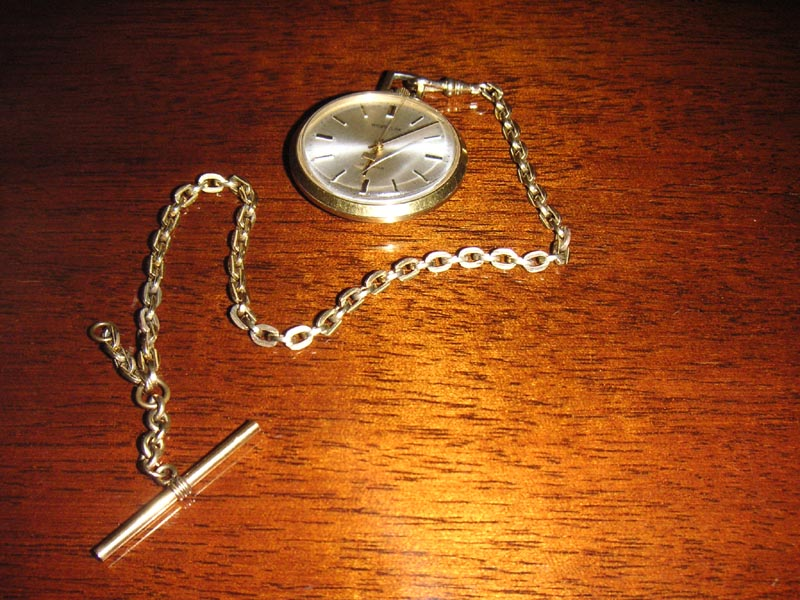
A Westclox seventeen-jewel pocketwatch.

In 1938, Westclox introduced its first portable travel alarm clock to the market.

== World War II wartime efforts ==
During World War II, Westclox and other General Time Corporation subsidiaries produced aviation instrumentation and control components, compasses for the United States Army, and clocks for the United States Navy. Westclox became a major manufacturer of fuzes for military ordnance. Clocks for the civilian market stopped production in 1942.

Beginning in 1943, Westclox and other companies introduced clocks for the civilian market that used much less brass than previously. Clocks were labeled as "Waralarm" by Westclox and only referenced city of origin; no mention of maker appeared. Other clock companies also produced clocks that were labeled "War Alarm", such as Gilbert and Telechron. Price was set by the Office of Price Management at $1.65.

Production of civilian models resumed in 1946.

Records documenting Westclox's corporate history from 1884 through the 1970s are preserved in the Northern Illinois University Regional History Center archives, including board minutes, financial records, correspondence, and the company newsletter "Tick Talk" (1913-1971).

== Watches ==
The Westclox company was a major manufacturer of dollar watches. It started production of an inexpensive, back-winding pocket watch in 1899, which was intended to be affordable to any working person. The company continued to produce cheap pocket watches into the 1990s.

== Developments ==
In 1959, Westclox introduced and patented its "drowse" alarm, which was one of the first of its kind powered by electricity, which integrated what is now more commonly known as a "snooze" function. Talley Industries acquired General Time in 1968. Westclox introduced its first quartz movement in 1972. In 1988, the management of Talley Industries purchased General Time from the company. Another bankruptcy shortly followed, and Salton, Inc. acquired the "Westclox", "Big Ben", and "Spartus" trademarks in 2001 for $9.8 million.

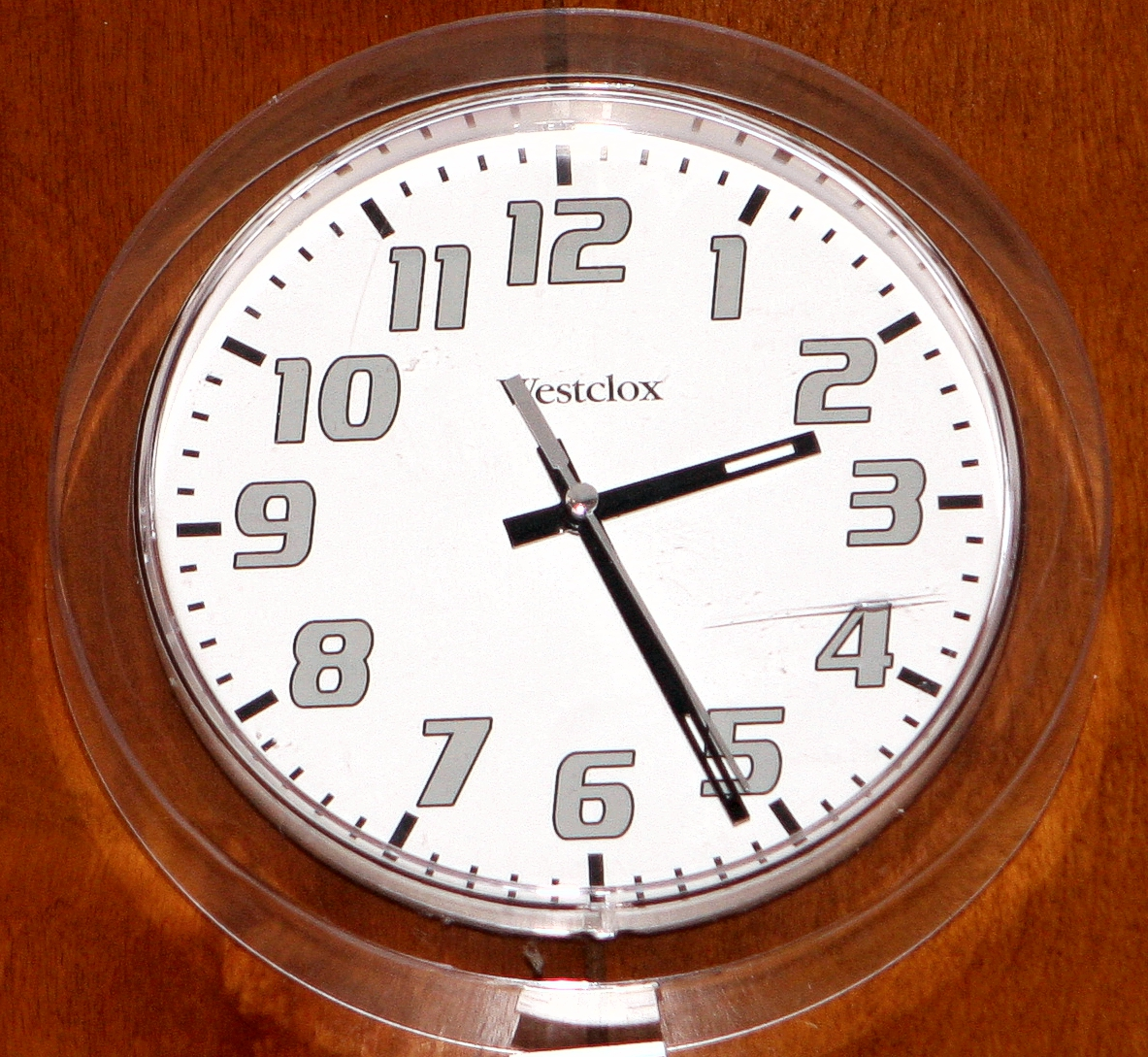
Modern Westclox wall clock

In October 2007, Salton sold its entire time products business, including the Westclox and Ingraham trademarks, to NYL Holdings LLC.

== 2012 New Year's Fire ==
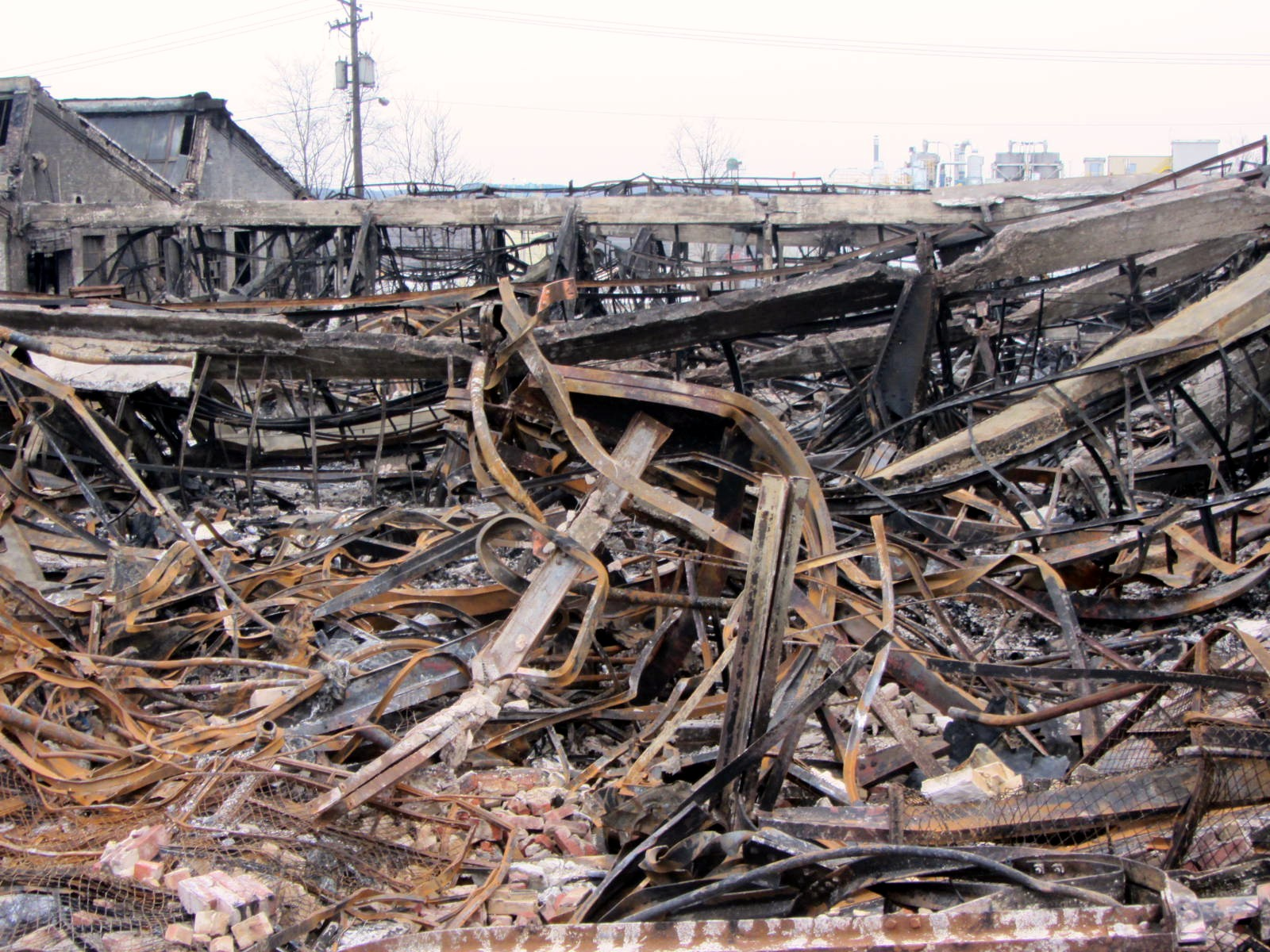
Remains of the factory after the fire

In the early morning of January 1, 2012, a fire broke out at the Westclox factory in Peru, Illinois. The fire destroyed about 25% of the structure. Two teens were charged with aggravated arson; Steven M. Gallacher (then 17) of LaSalle, Illinois, and an unidentified minor (then 16). The fire required firefighters and police from 20 surrounding municipalities to extinguish. One firefighter, LaSalle fireman Steve Smith, sustained a career-ending injury when a firehose attached to a hydrant popped loose and the metal coupling on the end hit him in the leg. Gallacher was convicted of aggravated arson on October 11, 2012, with a sentence of 6–30 years without the possibility of parole. Gallacher's sentence of aggravated arson was the direct result of the fire plus Smith's injury.

== Current ownership ==
NYL Holdings LLC currently owns and operates the Westclox brand along with several other historic American clock brands. The company acquired Westclox, Big Ben, and Ingraham trademarks from Salton Inc. in October 2007.

NYL Holdings' portfolio includes the iconic Big Ben and Baby Ben alarm clock brands, the Ingraham clock brand (established in 1831), and Timelink brand products.

The company maintains information about its clock brands and their history on its website westcloxsource.com.

== See also ==
- Westclox Scotland
