= Alarm clock =

Type of clock

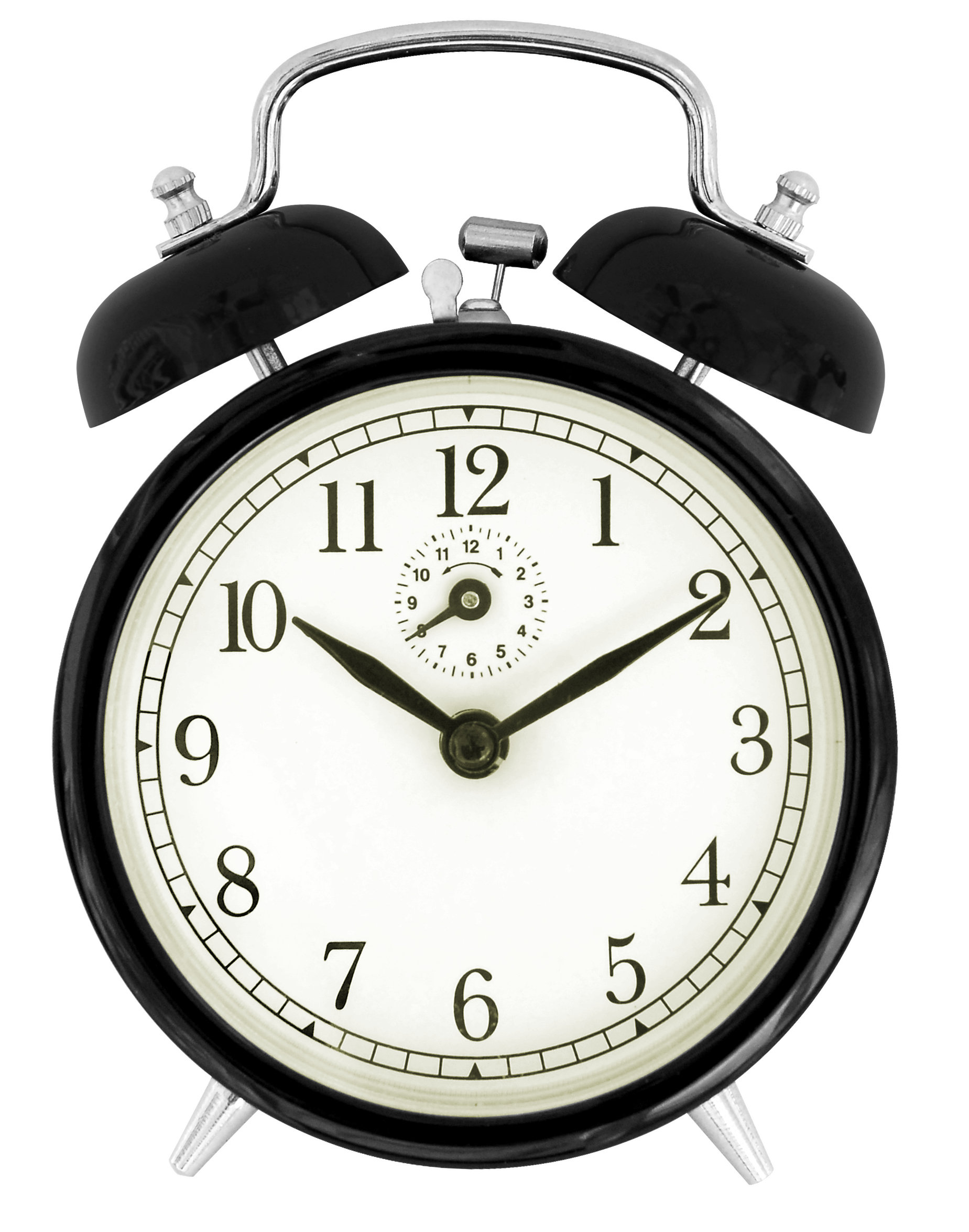
A traditional wind-up (key-wound), mechanical spring-powered alarm clock

An alarm clock or alarm is a clock that is designed to alert an individual or group of people at a specified time. The primary function of these clocks is to awaken people from their night's sleep or short naps; they can sometimes be used for other reminders as well. Most alarm clocks make sounds; some make light or vibration. Some have sensors to identify when a person is in a light stage of sleep, to avoid waking someone who is deeply asleep, which causes tiredness, even if the person has had adequate sleep. To turn off the sound or light, a button or handle on the clock is pressed; most clocks automatically turn off the alarm if left unattended long enough. A classic analog alarm clock has an extra hand or inset dial that is used to show the time at which the alarm will ring.

Many alarm clocks have radio receivers that can be set to start playing at specified times, and are known as clock radios. Additionally, some alarm clocks can set multiple alarms. A progressive alarm clock can have different alarms for different times (see next-generation alarms) and play music of the user's choice. Most modern televisions, computers, mobile phones and digital watches have alarm functions that automatically turn on or sound alerts at a specific time.

== Types ==
=== Traditional (analogue) clocks ===
Traditional mechanical alarm clocks have one or two bells that ring by means of a mainspring that powers a gear to quickly move a hammer back and forth between the two bells, or between the internal sides of a single bell. In some models, the metal cover at back of the clock itself also functions as the bell. In an electronically operated bell-type alarm clock, the bell is rung by an electromagnetic circuit with an armature that turns the circuit on and off repeatedly.

=== Digital ===
Digital alarm clocks can make other noises. Simple battery-powered alarm clocks make a loud buzzing, ringing or beeping sound to wake a sleeper, while novelty alarm clocks can speak, laugh, sing, or play sounds from nature.

=== Clock radio ===
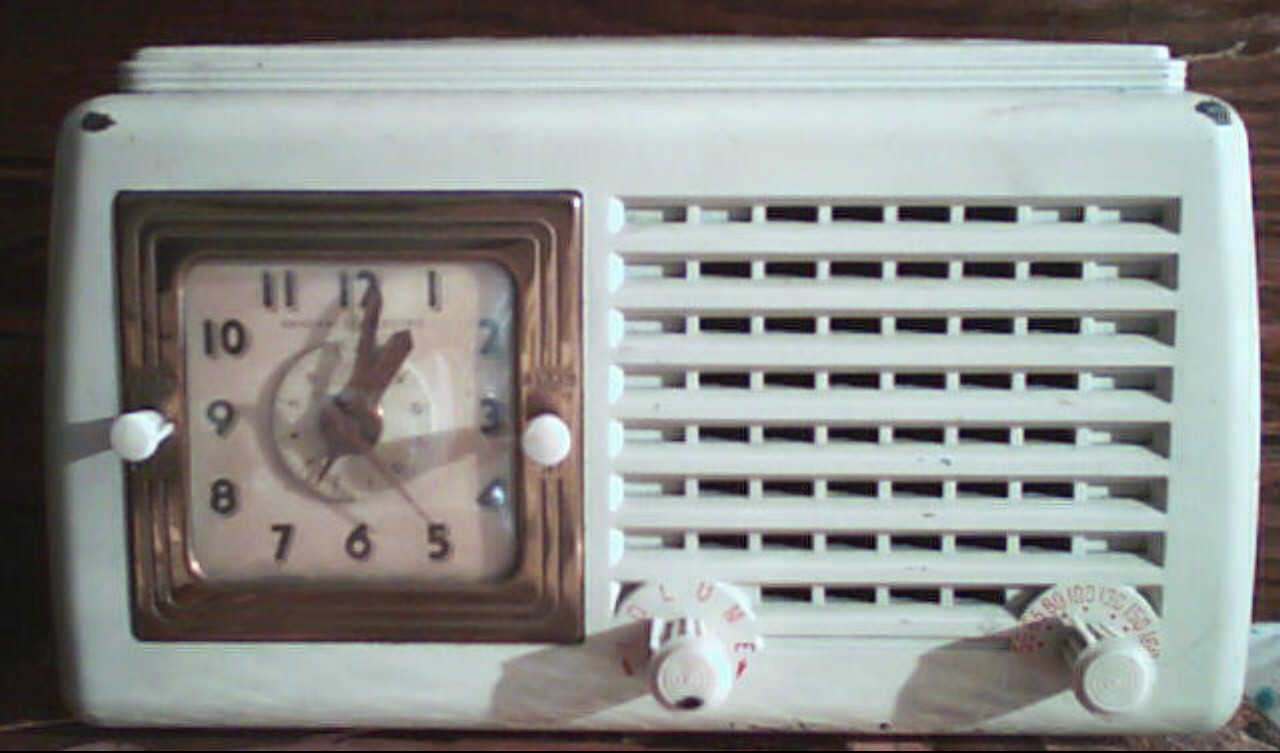
A mid-1940s alarm clock radio with AM radio stations only

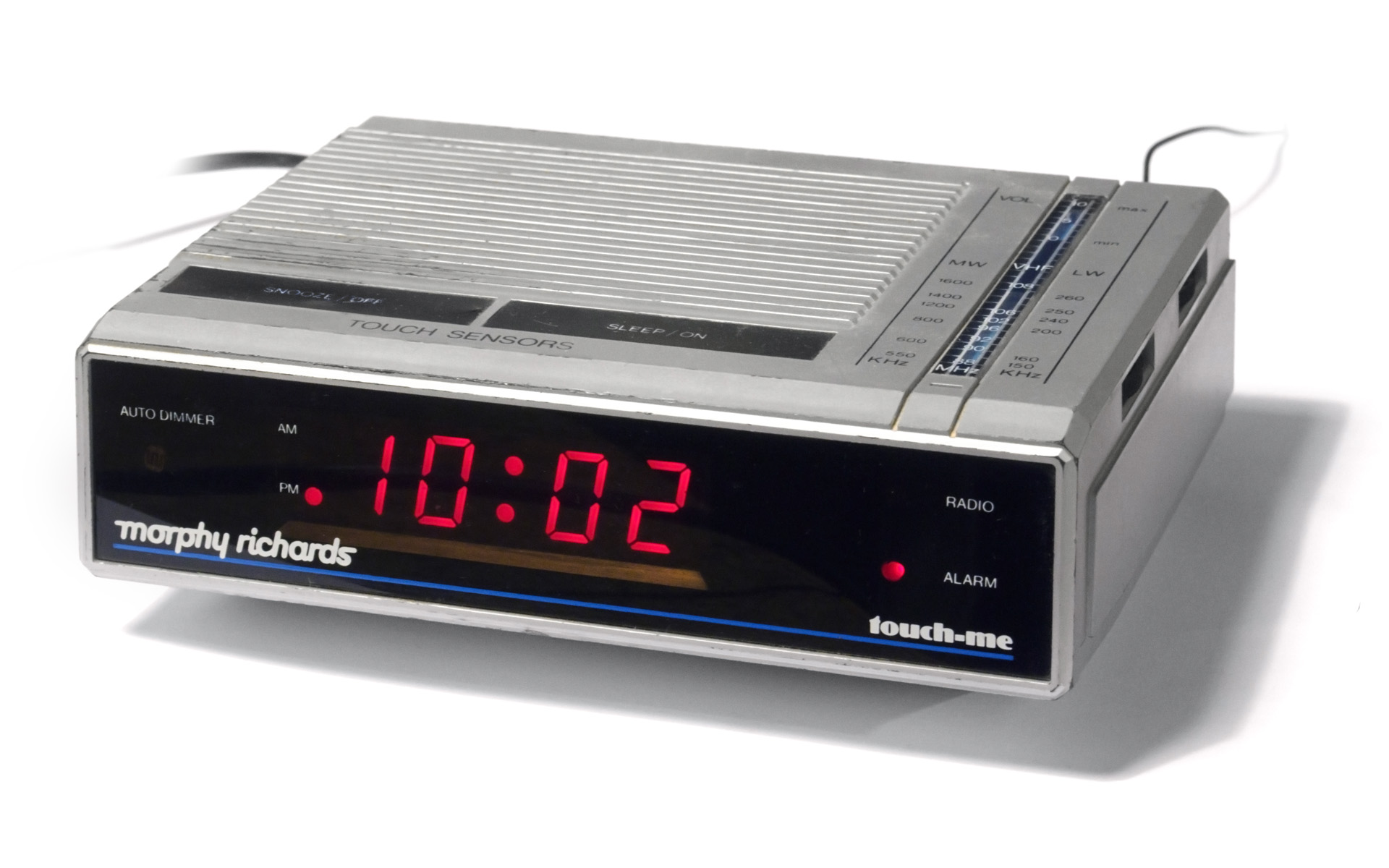
A typical 1980s clock radio featuring a digital clock/alarm and an analogue FM/MW/LW receiver

A clock radio is an alarm clock and radio receiver integrated in one device. The clock may turn on the radio at a designated time to wake the user, and usually includes a buzzer alarm. Typically, clock radios are placed on the bedside stand. Some models offer dual alarm for awakening at different times. Some clock radios also have a "sleep" timer, which turns the radio on for a set amount of time (usually around one hour). This is useful for people who like to fall asleep while listening to the radio.

Some clock radios can accept music sources from an external source, for example, an audio CD or portable music player; the selected music would then be used to awaken the sleeper. Clock models of the 2000s may come with a dock for iPod that also charges the device. They may serve as a typical music player, playing music from aforementioned sources. The popularity of alarms featuring iPod/smartphone docks ended circa. 2010s. Taking their place are models offering "nature sounds" like rain, forest, wind, sea, waterfall etc., in place of, or in addition to, the traditional buzzer.

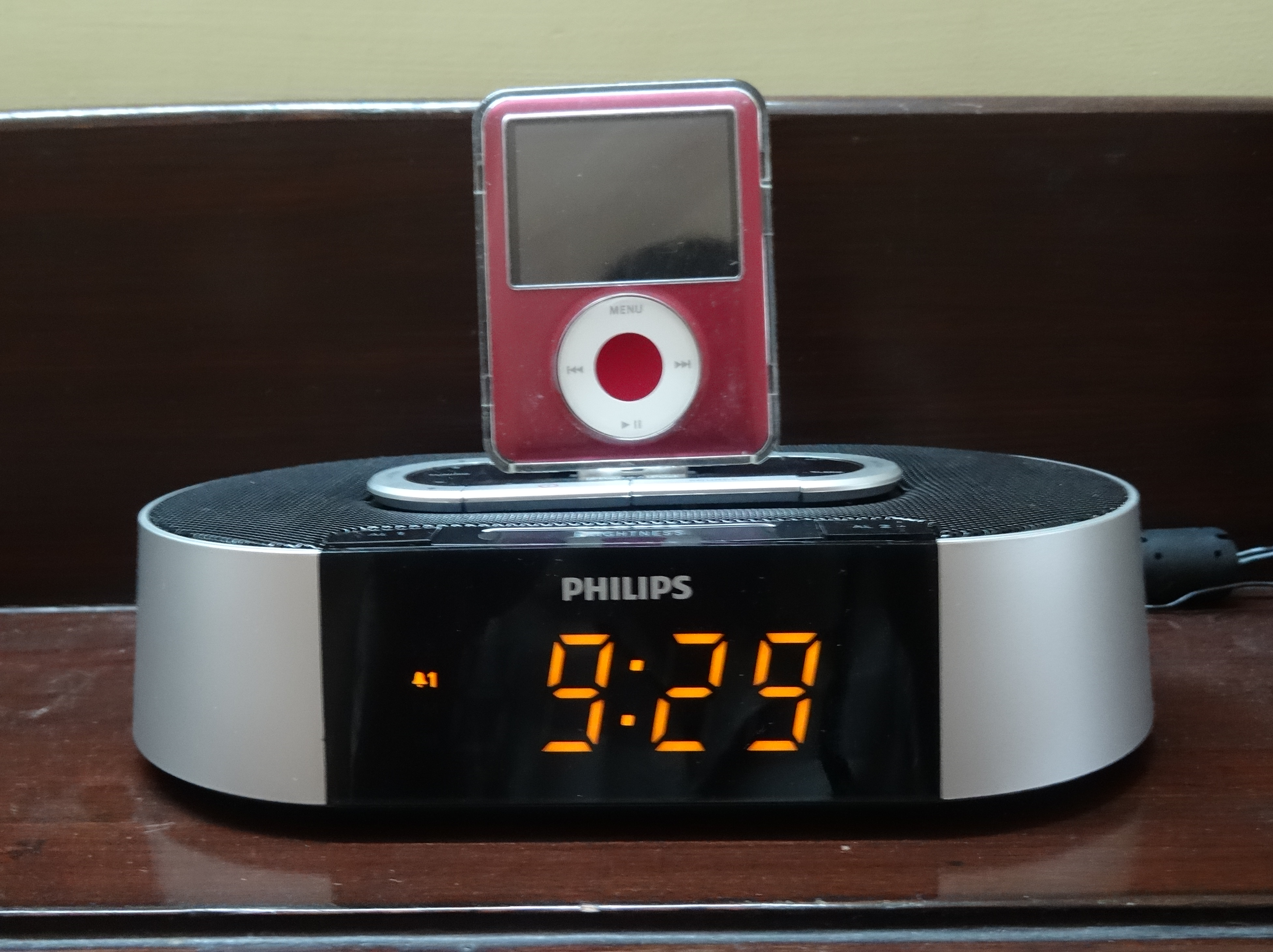
Alarm clock from the early 2010s featuring a radio/iPod/buzzer as alarms

Clock radios are powered by AC power from the wall socket. In the event of a power interruption, older electronic digital models used to reset the time to midnight (0:00; 12:00 am) and lose alarm settings. This would cause failure to trigger the alarm even if the power is restored, such as in the event of a power outage. Many newer clock radios feature a battery backup to maintain the time and alarm settings. Some advanced radio clocks (not to be confused with clocks with AM/FM radios) have a feature which sets the time automatically using signals from atomic clock-synced time signal radio stations such as WWV, making the clock accurate and immune to time reset due to power interruptions.

== History ==
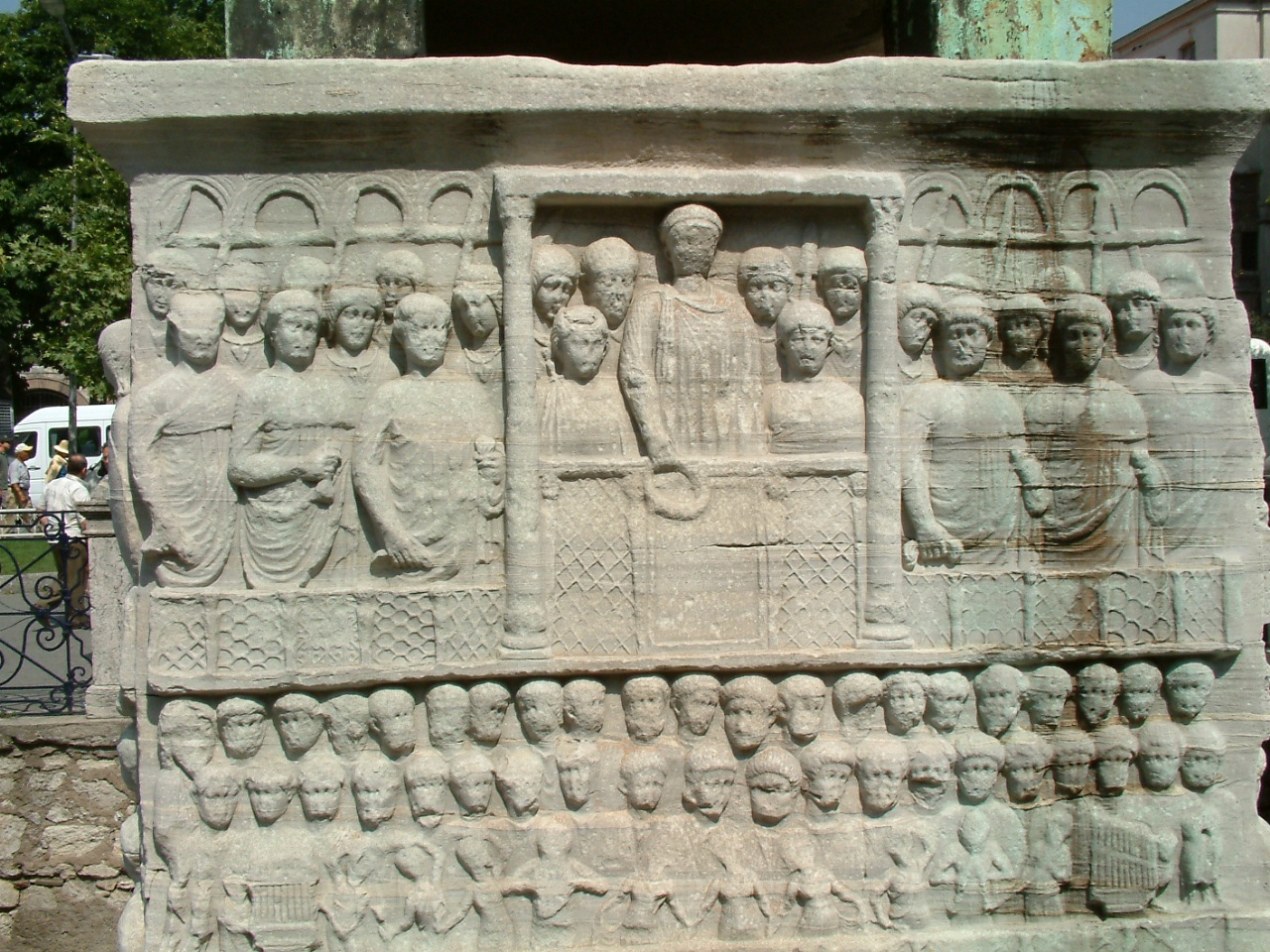
The Obelisk of Theodosius, detail of the pedestal: Theodosius I offers laurels of victory; we can see the water organ of Ctesibius, in the lower right-hand corner.

The ancient Greek philosopher Plato (428–348 BCE) was said to possess a large water clock with an unspecified alarm signal similar to the sound of a water organ; he used it at night, possibly for signaling the beginning of his lectures at dawn (Athenaeus 4.174c). The Hellenistic engineer and inventor Ctesibius (fl. 285–222 BCE) fitted his clepsydras with dial and pointer for indicating the time, and added elaborate "alarm systems, which could be made to drop pebbles on a gong, or blow trumpets (by forcing bell-jars down into water and taking the compressed air through a beating reed) at pre-set times" (Vitruv 11.11).

The late Roman statesman Cassiodorus (c. 485–585) advocated in his rulebook for monastic life the water clock as a useful alarm for the "soldiers of Christ" (Cassiod. Inst. 30.4 f.). The Christian rhetorician Procopius described in detail prior to 529 a complex public striking clock in his home town Gaza which featured an hourly gong and figures moving mechanically day and night.

In China, a striking clock was devised by the Buddhist monk and inventor Yi Xing (683–727). The Chinese engineers Zhang Sixun and Su Song integrated striking clock mechanisms in astronomical clocks in the 10th and 11th centuries, respectively. A striking clock outside of China was the water-powered clock tower near the Umayyad Mosque in Damascus, Syria, which struck once every hour. It is the subject of a book, On the Construction of Clocks and their Use (1203), by Riḍwān ibn al-Sāʿātī, the son of clockmaker. In 1235, an early monumental water-powered alarm clock that "announced the appointed hours of prayer and the time both by day and by night" was completed in the entrance hall of the Mustansiriya Madrasah in Baghdad.

From the 14th century, some clock towers in Western Europe were also capable of chiming at a fixed time every day; the earliest of these was described by the Florentine writer Dante Alighieri in 1319. The most famous original striking clock tower still standing is possibly the one in St Mark's Clocktower in St Mark's Square, Venice. The St Mark's Clock was assembled in 1493, by the famous clockmaker Gian Carlo Rainieri from Reggio Emilia, where his father Gian Paolo Rainieri had already constructed another famous device in 1481. In 1497, Simone Campanato moulded the great bell (h. 1,56 m., diameter m. 1,27), which was put on the top of the tower where it was alternatively beaten by the Due Mori (Two Moors), two bronze statues (h. 2,60) handling a hammer.

User-settable mechanical alarm clocks date back at least to 15th-century Europe. These early alarm clocks had a ring of holes in the clock dial and were set by placing a pin in the appropriate hole.

The first American alarm clock was created in 1787 by Levi Hutchins in Concord, New Hampshire. This device he made only for himself, however, and it only rang at 4 am, to wake him for his job. The French inventor Antoine Redier was the first to patent an adjustable mechanical alarm clock, in 1847.

Alarm clocks, like almost all other consumer goods in the United States, ceased production in the spring of 1942, as the factories which made them were converted over to war work during World War II, but they were one of the first consumer items to resume manufacture for civilian use, in November 1944. By that time, a critical shortage of alarm clocks had developed due to older clocks wearing out or breaking down. Workers were late for, or missed completely, their scheduled shifts in jobs critical to the war effort. In a pooling arrangement overseen by the Office of Price Administration, several clock companies were allowed to start producing new clocks, some of which were continuations of pre-war designs, and some of which were new designs, thus becoming among the first "postwar" consumer goods to be made, before the war had even ended. The price of these "emergency" clocks was, however, still strictly regulated by the Office of Price Administration.

The first radio alarm clock was invented by James F. Reynolds, in the 1940s and another design was also invented by Paul L. Schroth Sr.

== Alarms in technology ==
=== Computer alarms ===
Alarm clock software programs have been developed for personal computers. There are Web-based alarm clocks, some of which may allow a virtually unlimited number of alarm times (i.e. Personal information manager) and personalized tones. However, unlike mobile phone alarms, online alarm clocks have some limitations. They do not work when the computer is shut off or in sleep mode. Native applications, however, can wake the computer up from sleep using the built-in real-time clock alarm chip or even power it back on after it had been shut down.

=== Mobile phone alarms ===
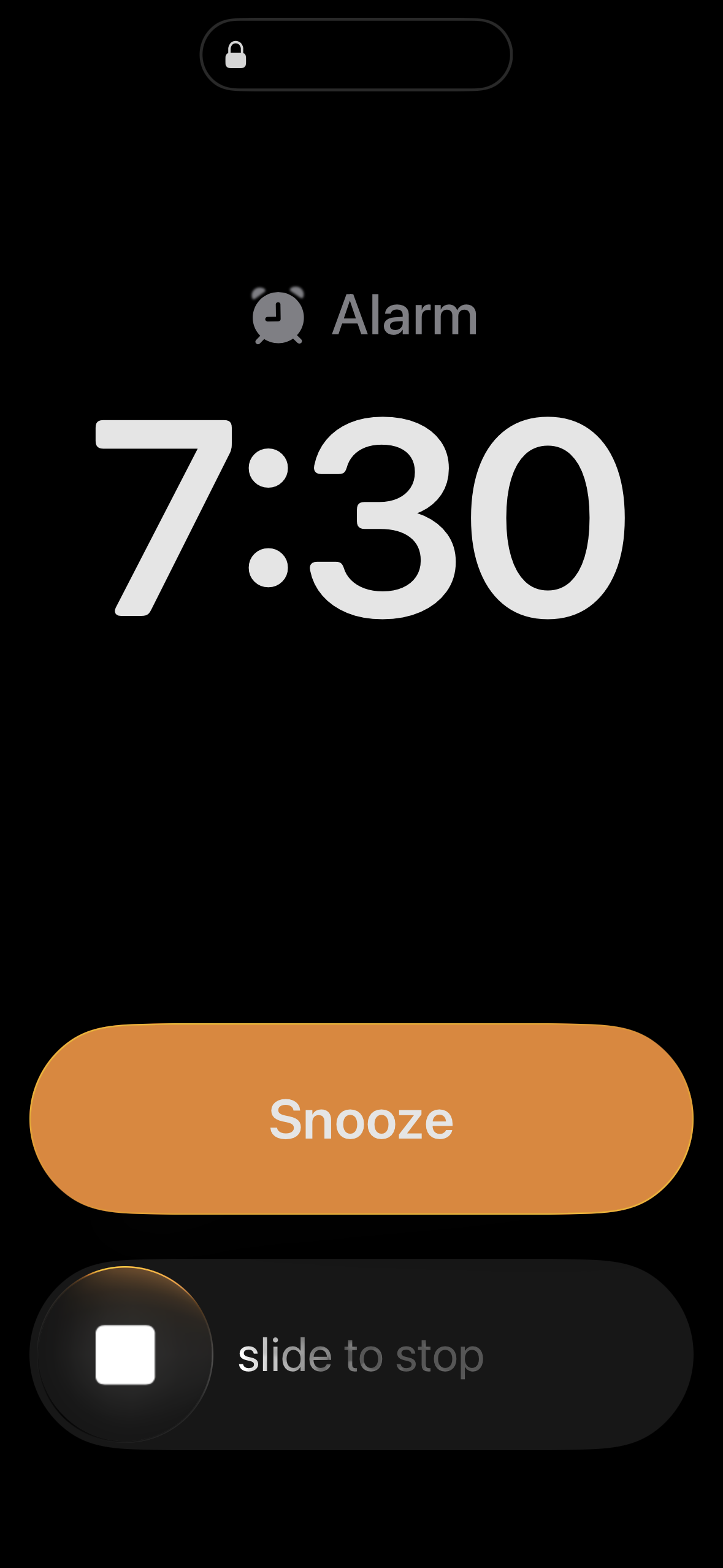
A screenshot of an alarm going off in iOS

Many modern mobile phones feature built-in alarm clocks that do not need the phone to be switched on for the alarm to ring off. Some of these mobile phones feature the ability for the user to set the alarm's ringtone, and in some cases music can be downloaded to the phone and then chosen to play for waking.

== Next-generation alarms ==
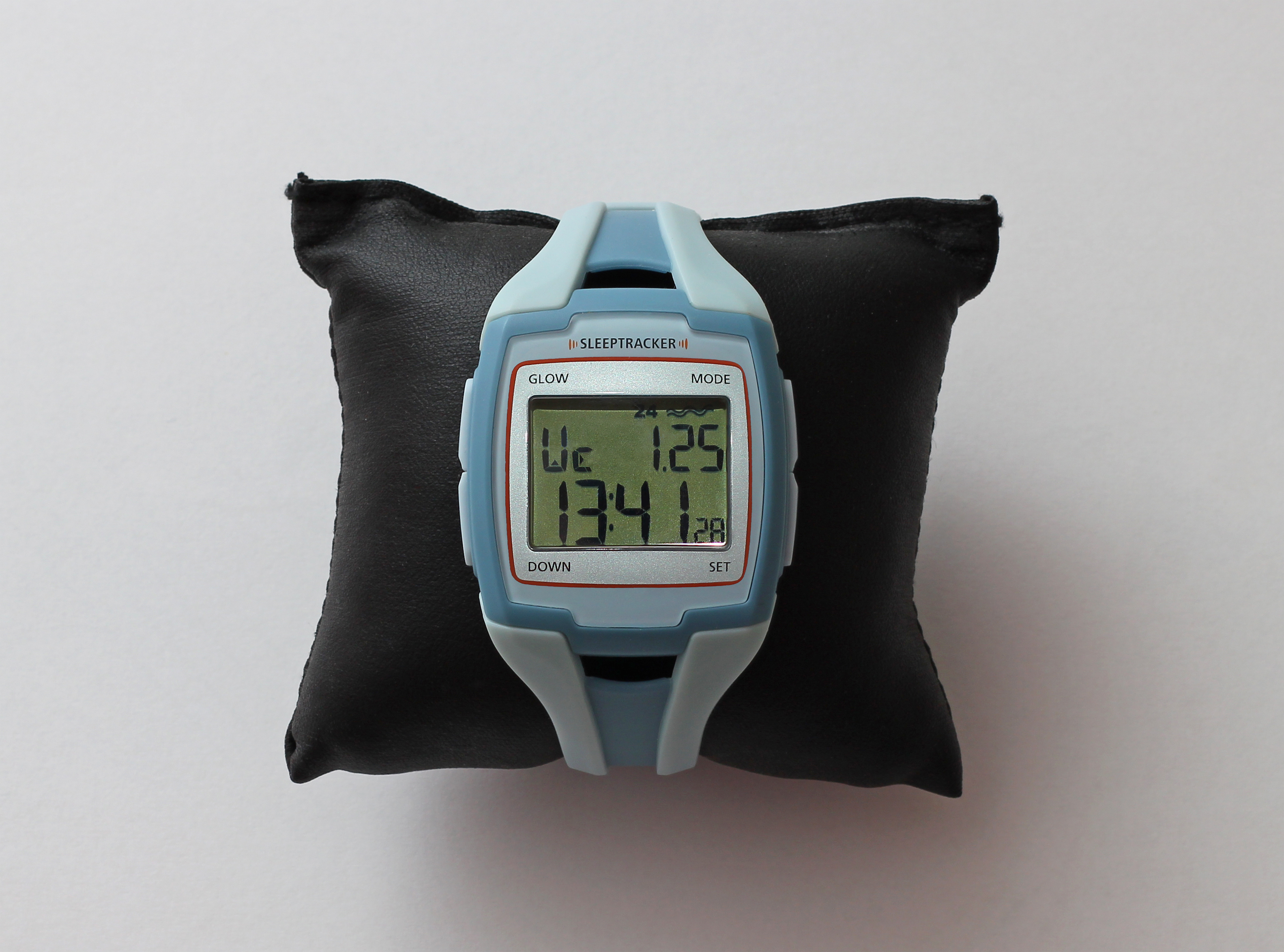
Sleeptracker, an alarm clock that tracks sleep phases

Scientific studies on sleep having shown that sleep stage at awakening is an important factor in amplifying sleep inertia. Alarm clocks involving sleep stage monitoring appeared on the market in 2005. The alarm clocks use sensing technologies such as EEG electrodes and accelerometers to wake people from sleep. Dawn simulators are another technology meant to mediate these effects.

Sleepers can become accustomed to the sound of their alarm clock if it has been used for a period of time, making it less effective. Due to progressive alarm clocks' complex waking procedure, they can deter this adaptation due to the body needing to adapt to more stimuli than just a simple sound alert.

=== Alarm signals for impaired hearing ===
The deaf and hard of hearing are often unable to perceive auditory alarms when asleep. They may use specialized alarms, including alarms with flashing lights instead of or in addition to noise. Alarms which can connect to vibrating devices (small ones inserted into pillows, or larger ones placed under bedposts to shake the bed) also exist.

== Time switches ==
Time switches can be used to turn on anything that will awaken a sleeper, and can therefore be used as alarms. Lights, bells, and radio and TV sets can easily be used. More elaborate devices have also been used, such as machines that automatically prepare tea or coffee. A sound is produced when the drink is ready, so the sleeper awakes to find the freshly brewed drink waiting.

== Snooze ==
Many modern alarm clocks have a snooze function, usually a large button on the top that silences the alarm and sets it to resume sounding a few minutes later, which is useful for people who turn off the alarm and then fall back asleep. If the alarm sound is turned off using the snooze function, the alarm will go off again after a few minutes. This continues until the alarm is permanently switched off. In this way, one can "stay in bed a little longer" without the risk of actually oversleeping. The button is also called "drowse", which means virtually the same thing.

The first alarm clock that came with snooze buttons is in 1956 with General Electric-Telechron’s Model 7H241 "Snooz-Alarm" that incorporated a 9-minute “snooze.”. Due to it being mechanical, the snooze duration is set by a standard gear setup that innovators had to work with. Getting the gear teeth to line up to allow for exactly ten minutes is impossible, so manufacturer had to choose between setting it at nine minutes and a few seconds, or a little bit over ten minutes, which was considered too long. Thus, the snooze duration is set at 9 minutes. Such duration was then carried over to electronic alarm clocks and then clock apps on phone. iPhones had a hard-set 9 minutes snooze duration until iOS 26, while Android users had long been able to change the duration due to having varieties in clock app. As an alternative solution, some clock apps allow multiple times to be set, such that as soon as the first alarm is turned off, it will go off again at the next set time. This continues until all set times have been used.

It has been suggested that snoozing interferes with the brains' wake-up process.

== Health effects ==
A 2024 pilot study by researchers at the University of Virginia found that being forced awake by an alarm clock, after short sleep duration, resulted in a 74% higher morning blood pressure surge for subjects compared to natural awakening. This sudden awakening can activate the sympathetic nervous system, inducing a "fight-or-flight response that places additional stress on the heart.

== See also ==
- Delayed sleep phase syndrome
- Digital clock
- Knocker-up
- Light therapy
- Teasmade
- Timer
- Wake-up call

== Sources ==
- Humphrey, John William; Oleson, John Peter; Sherwood, Andrew N. (2003), Greek and Roman Technology: A Sourcebook. Annotated Translations of Greek and Latin Texts and Documents, Taylor & Francis Routledge, ISBN 978-0-203-41325-8
- Landels, John G. (1979), "Water-Clocks and Time Measurement in Classical Antiquity", Endeavour, vol. 3, no. 1, pp. 32–37, doi:10.1016/0160-9327(79)90007-3
- Lewis, Michael (2000), "Theoretical Hydraulics, Automata, and Water Clocks", in Wikander, Örjan (ed.), Handbook of Ancient Water Technology, Technology and Change in History, vol. 2, Leiden: Brill, pp. 343–369, ISBN 978-90-04-11123-3
