= Travel alarm clock =

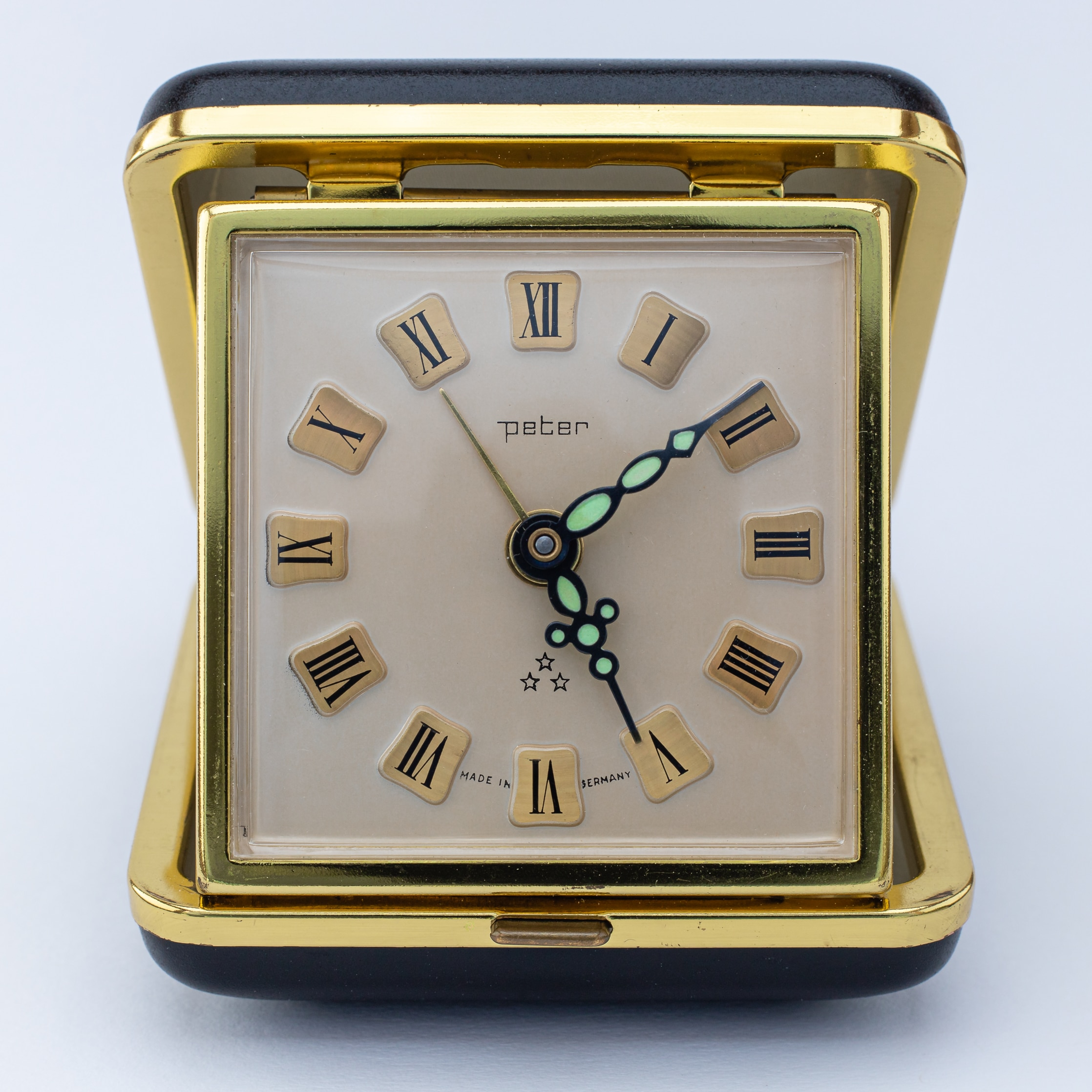
Peter travel alarm clock, circa 1960

A travel clock, travel alarm clock and in some cases pouch alarm clock, is an alarm clock whose primary characteristic is that it must have a size, design, and weight that make it easily transportable during a trip, so it is usually contained in a box or case. In the case of an alarm clock, the box must let the acoustic signal pass through to wake up from sleep at the set time or time and date.

== History ==
For a long time, watches were luxury items. Most of the population's sleep ended when it got light, or the rooster crowed. The night watchman awakened the few who had to rise before dawn. However, watches with an additional alarm function have been around for as long as classic watches, that is, since the 14th century. In Dante's Divine Comedy of 1320, there is a very precise description of a clock equipped with a bell mechanism.

Descriptions of water clocks have been preserved from antiquity, where the water level in a vessel indicated the time. Most had floats inserted, which activated bells or figures through a lever when it reached a certain filling level. In 12th-century monasteries, alarm clocks with bell signals reminded people to observe prayer times. However, these "clocks" have not survived to this day, except in the form of manuscripts.

The oldest surviving alarm clocks are the wall clocks that signaled the tower guards to ring the church bells. These so-called tower clocks date from the 15th and 16th centuries. .

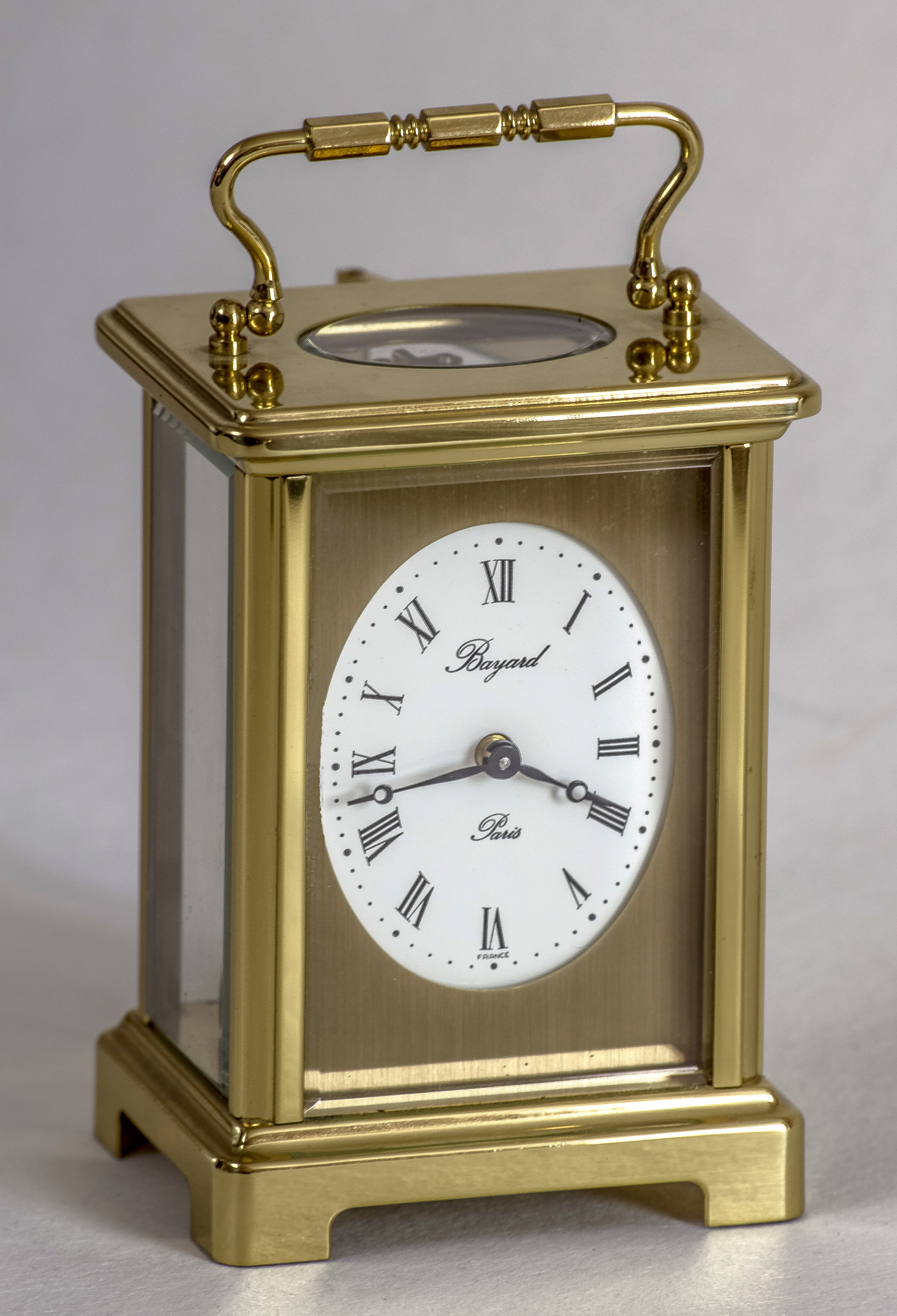
Travel alarm clock type "Pendule de voyage"

=== Renaissance and Baroque ===
With the invention of the flywheel and the spring as an energy reservoir, alarm clocks, including an alarm function, became portable. They were popular luxury accessories for wealthy and noble citizens. However, they were not yet to be used on the journey but only in the night barracks or at the place of arrival.

For traveling by carriage or horseback, from the 17th to the 19th centuries, a little chunky pocket watches with alarms. They indicate the intended use in their name, "carriage clocks". These carriage clocks kept reasonably accurate time despite the potholes and rocking of bumpy roads.

With the turn of the modern era, the first travel alarm clocks appeared, the "officer's alarm clocks", mainly used to wake up officers. These portable watches were valued as travel companions in wealthy circles. Therefore, they were also called "Pendule de Voyage".

From the 1860s and 1870s, the “Paris alarm clock”, initially produced in France, was very compact. Unlike its American counterpart, it still had a clockwork mechanism with solid plates and gears. This alarm clock with a short pendulum was aimed more at lower middle-class households.

=== Industrial era ===
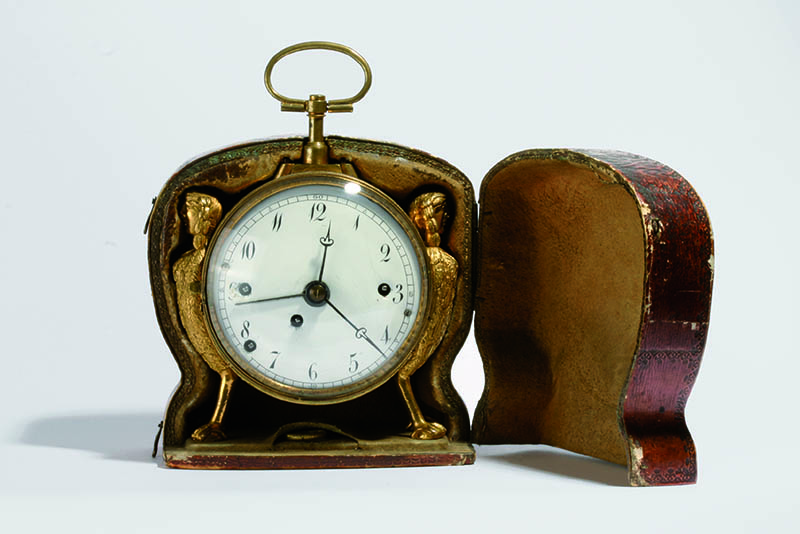
Travel alarm clock, Vienna around 1820

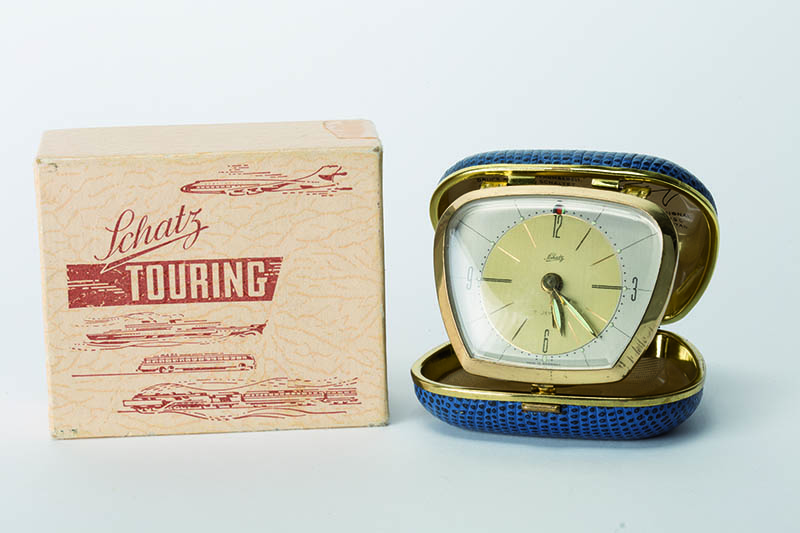
Pouch alarm clock, Schatz, Triberg circa 1956

At the end of the 19th century, workers and employees had to be on time for work. For a long time, the sturdy wooden clocks from the workshops and factories of the Black Forest were the most economical way to wake up reliably. Industrially manufactured table clocks with alarm functions based on the American model of cottage clocks were somewhat more expensive.

At the beginning of the 20th century, the travel alarm clock was adapted to the taste of the time. The attached bell disappeared, the back wall serving as a sounding board. The strong colors gave the alarm clocks a friendly look. Countless shapes were created so that everyone could find "their" alarm clock. The alarm movement was also improved: there were alarm clocks with a repeater, inflated tone, or soft movement. Thanks to railroads and automobiles, the alarm clock was often used on trips. There are travel alarm clocks with a special case for this purpose.

A wristband travel alarm clock was patented in 1908 by the Eterna company. The best-known wristband-type travel alarm clock models were Jaeger-LeCoultre's Memovox in 1950 and Pierce's Duofon in 1955. While the dwellings adapted to the contemporary taste of the society, the technology remained the same for a long time. Only with electronics did the construction of travel alarm clock mechanisms change. The quartz revolution and clock radio technology ensured that high-precision travel alarm clocks were soon available for little money.

Since the late 20th century and early 21st century, travel alarm clocks have been gradually replaced as they are incorporated as an additional feature in many devices that contain a clock, such as mobile phones or smartphones with built-in alarm systems and the travel alarm was relegated to oblivion.

== Pouch travel clock ==
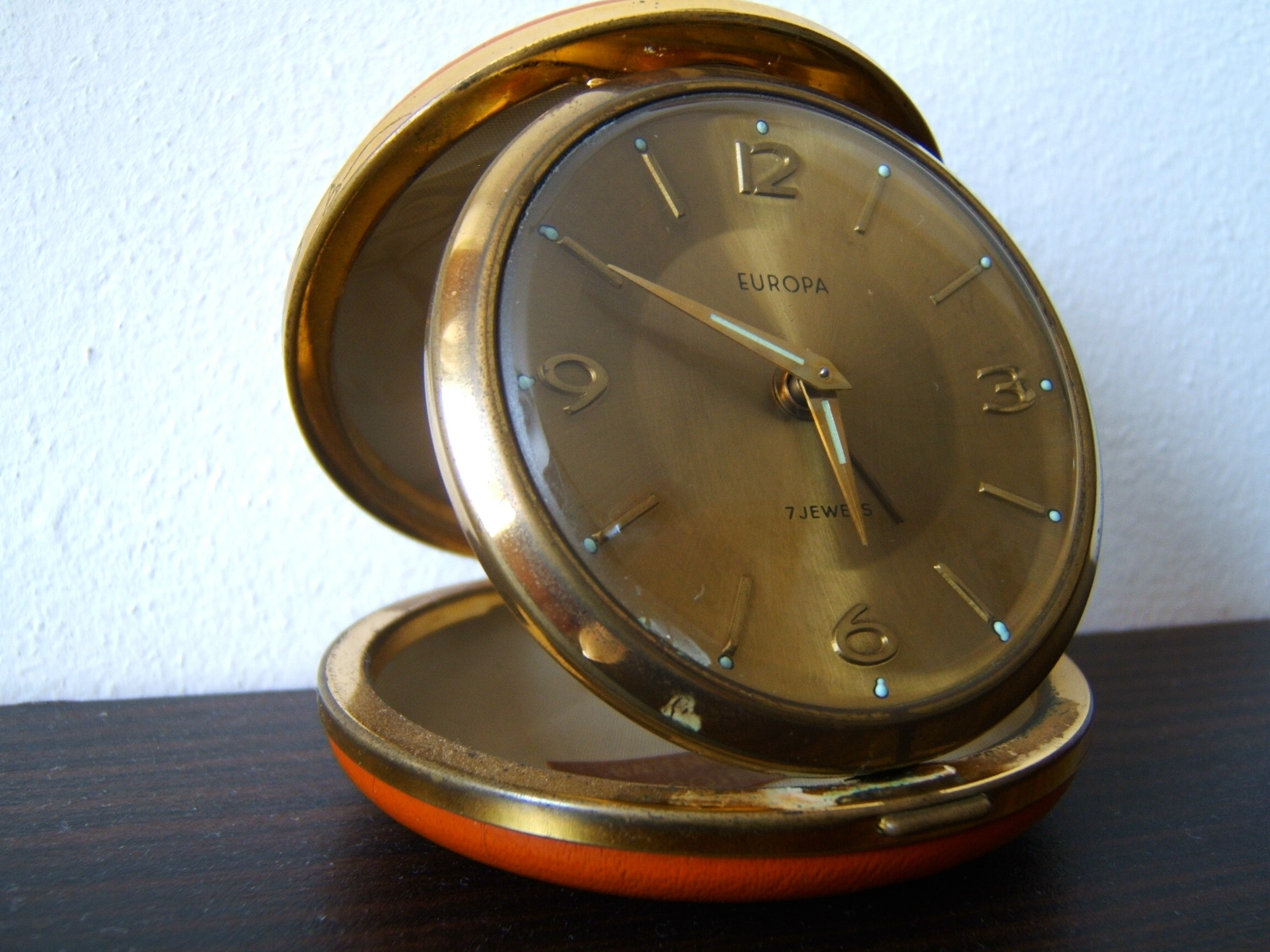
Pocket travel clock Europa, 1960

With the invention of portable clocks in the 16th century, the travel alarm clock became mobile thanks to the spring as an energy accumulator and the steering wheel. In the 1920s, travel alarm clocks were mass-produced with increasing mobility. At first, resembling the travel alarm clocks of earlier eras, they were covered in an elegant case that protected the watch while traveling. The watch was removed from its protective case at night and placed on the bedside table. Later, a hinge attached the machinery to the pouch-like sheath. So, the case protected the alarm clock and was also its support.

== Digital screen ==
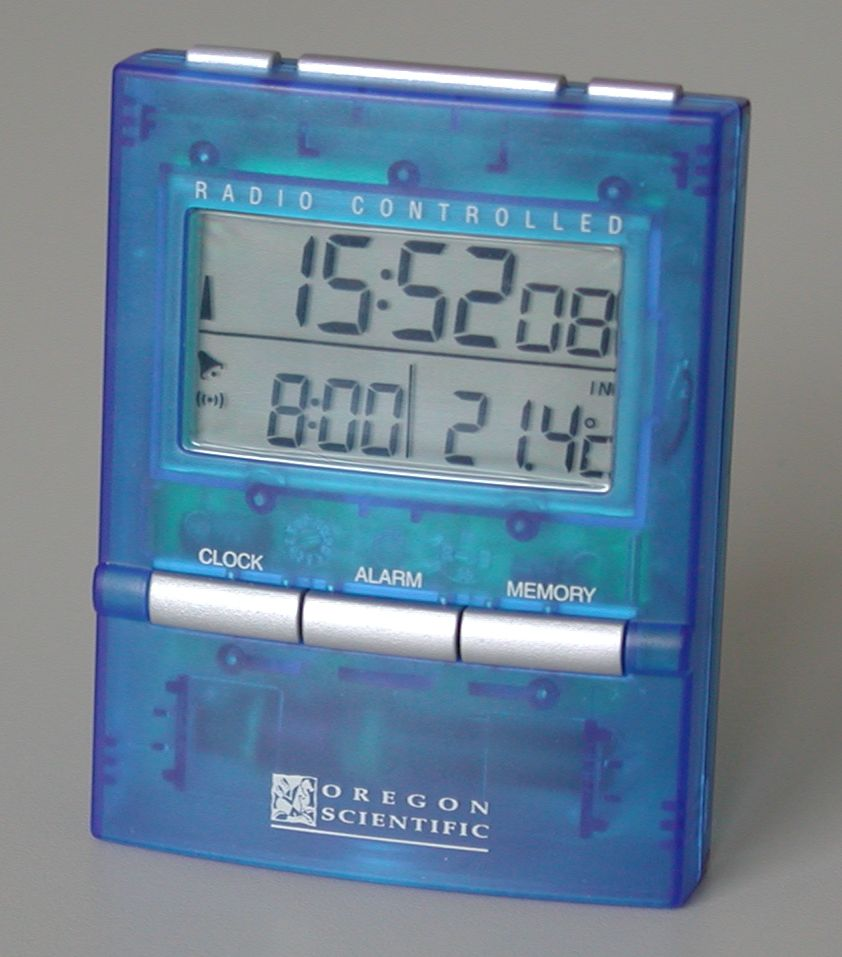
Digital travel alarm clock

Digital travel alarm clocks have an electronic clock mechanism that can display various data through the screen. This makes it possible to integrate numerous additional functions that would be difficult or impossible to implement in mechanical or electromechanical alarm clocks. In addition to the usual tasks of digital clocks, in some models, additional alarms can be preset depending on the day of the week or an automatic alarm clock when the outside temperature drops below a specified value.

== Repeat button ==
The repeat is used to briefly interrupt the alarm clock. The alarm sounds again after a certain period, depending on the device, after five or ten minutes. This interruption can be repeated as many times as you want. Finally, the alarm can only be turned off by deactivating the alarm button. The snooze button is generally designed to be easy to find in the dark. In addition to this button, Braun introduced several models in the 1980s whose alarm could also be stopped by "voice control"

== Gallery ==
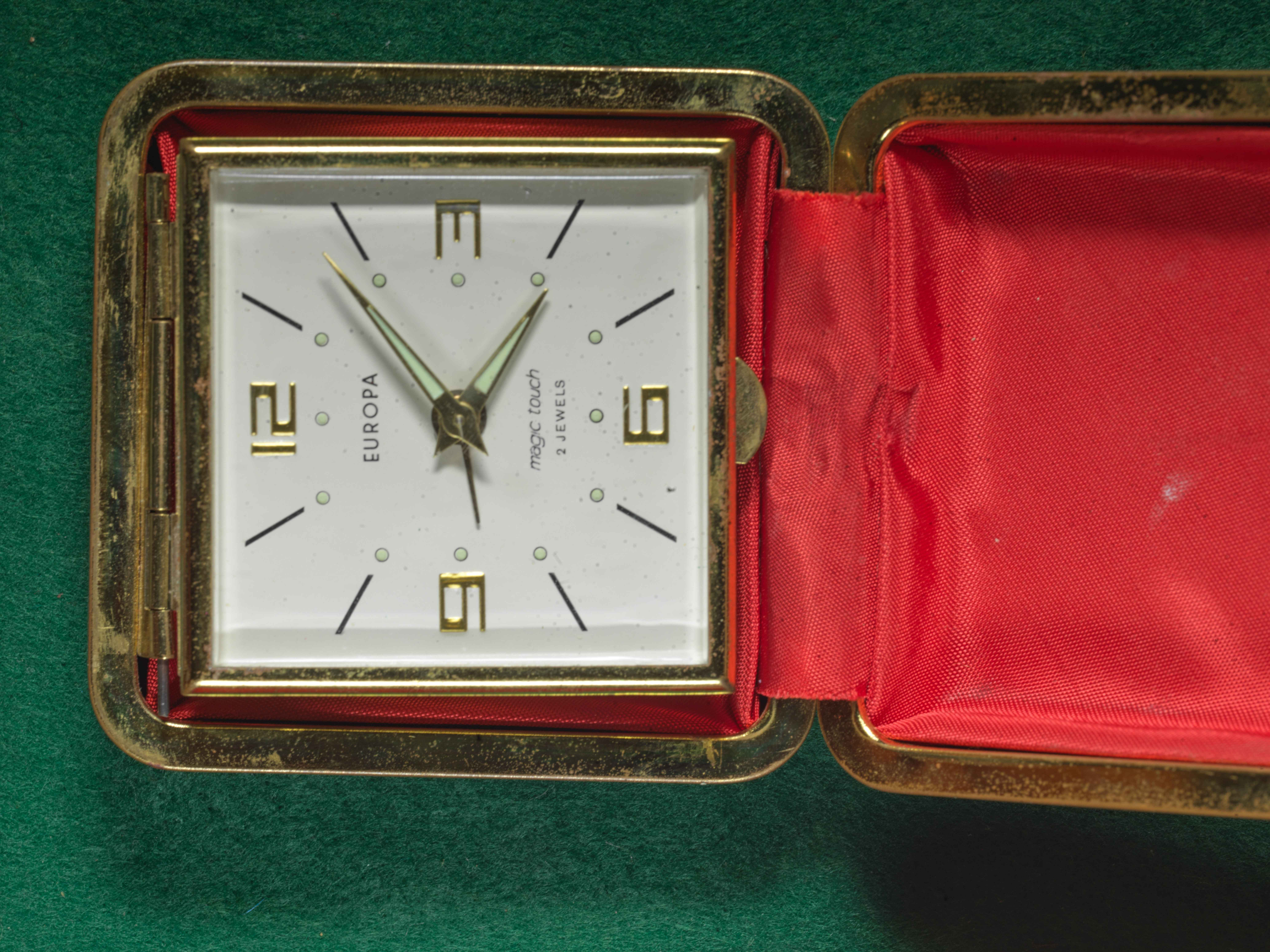
Europa travel clock

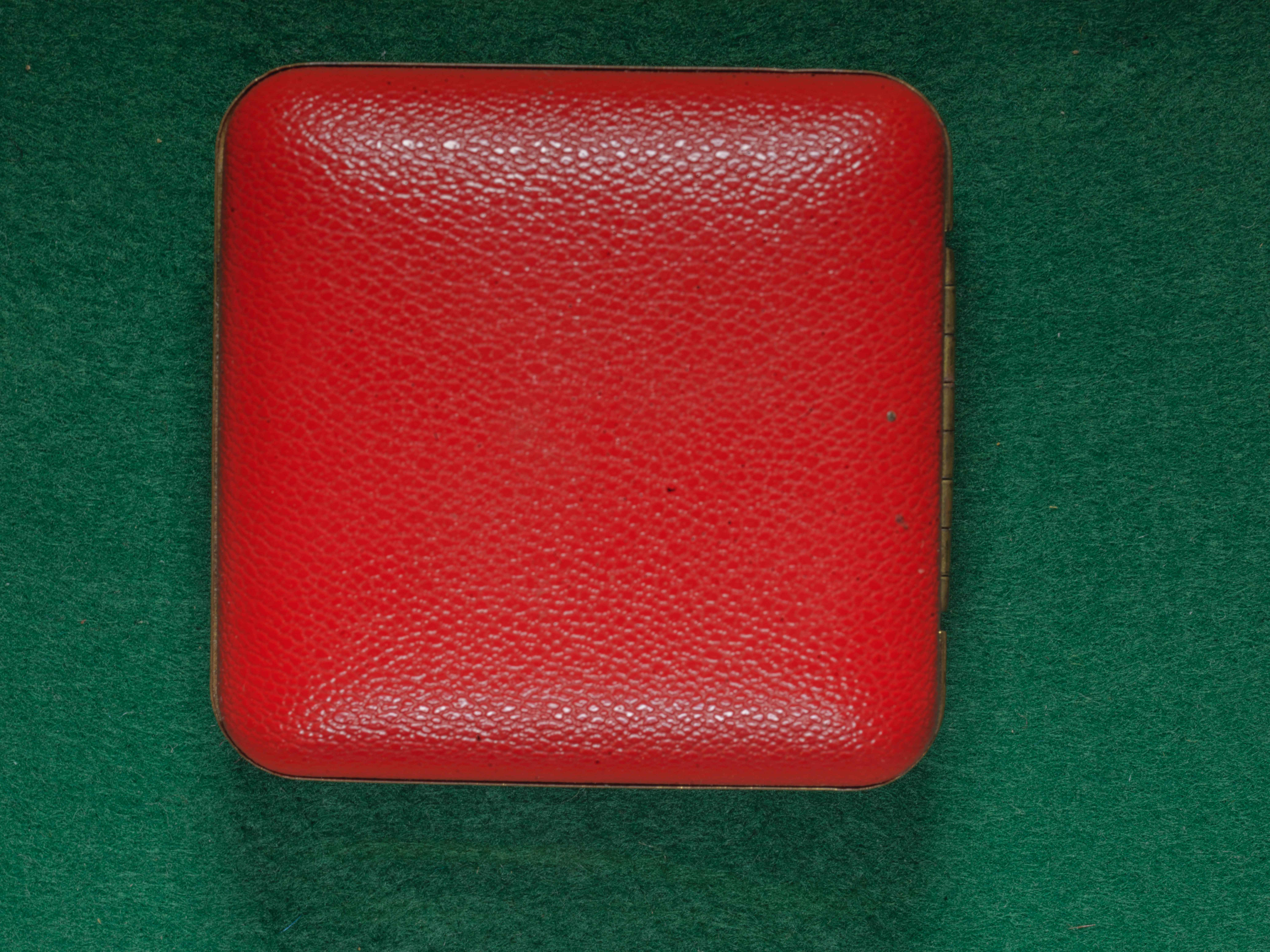
Europa travel clock

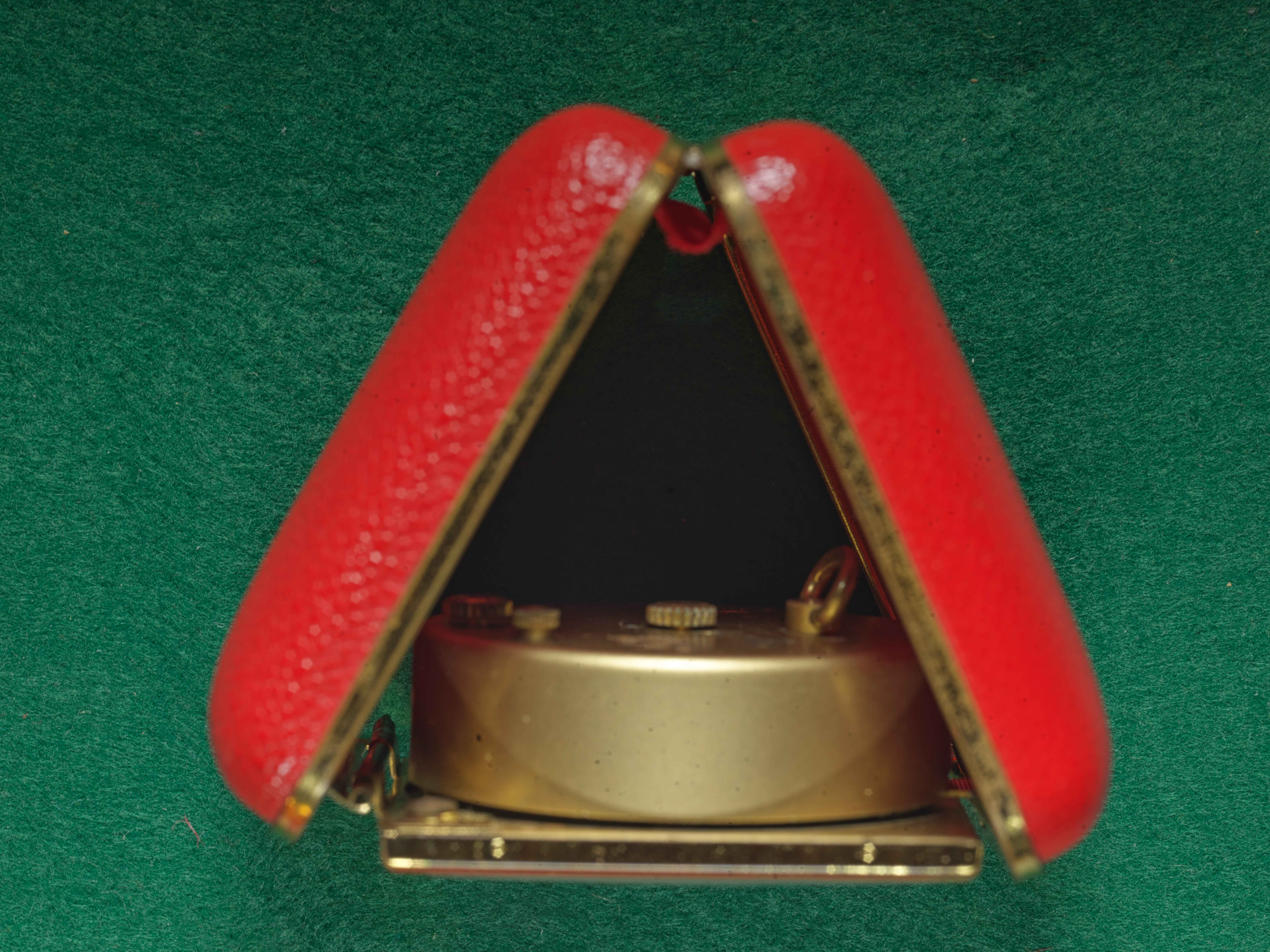
Europa travel clock

== Manufacturers of pocket travel clocks ==
- Europa, Micro (watches), Peter, Schatz

== Bibliography ==
- Emmanuelle Cournarie, La mecànica du geste, tros siècles d'histoire horlogère à Saint-Nicolas d'Aliermont, Édition PTC-Les Falaises, 2011 (francès)
- Lolita Delesque i Marianne Lombardi, Armand Couaillet, horloger et inventeur de génie, Musée de l'horlogerie, juny de 2013, 44p (francès)
