= Westclox Scotland =

Former clock factory in Scotland, United Kingdom

Westclox Scotland was a branch factory of clock manufacturer Westclox, situated in the Vale of Leven Industrial Estate in Dumbarton, Scotland. During its four decades of operation (1948–1988), Westclox Scotland produced over 50 million clocks.

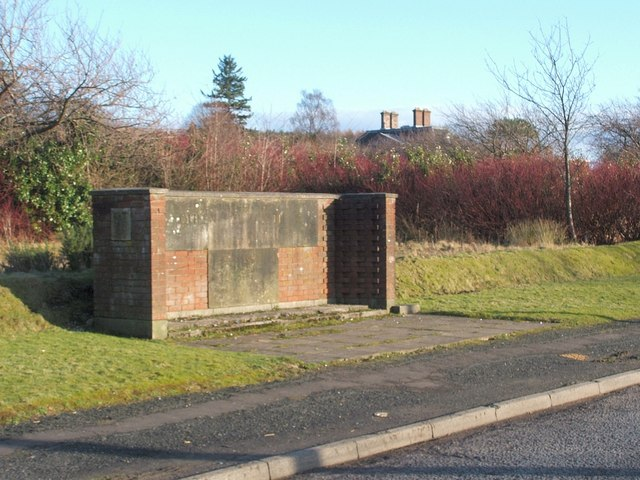
Plaques with inscriptions commemorating 2 Royal Visits to the Westclox Scotland factory.

== History ==
Westclox had originally planned to start production in Scotland in 1939 but World War II intervened and it was not until 1948 that they were able to fully commission their factory in Dumbarton.

Westclox Scotland produced its first clock on 21 September 1948; a spring wound alarm with a 4-inch (10 cm) dial. Their Scottish factory was a full manufacturing plant, at which all their clocks were assembled from start to finish with only the basic raw materials being brought in by outside suppliers. 95% of the staff were local people and the firm trained their employees from scratch to a high level of skill and had an annual apprenticeship for toolmakers and classes in horology.

By 1949 Westclox Scotland were making 10,000 clocks a week, and by 1950, 1,000,000 clocks had been produced since its opening. So successful was the Dumbarton factory that in the mid-1950s Westclox had to expand into adjoining buildings. The factory then added watches to their product line as well as timing devices for other sectors. By the mid-1960s, employment levels at the Scottish plant were around 1,100. Over a third of the clocks manufactured in Scotland were exported to some 110 countries across the globe.

Difficult times came in 1967 and 1968 when 400 workers were paid off and the future of the plant was in doubt - primarily due to competition from cheap clocks from the then Iron Curtain countries. However, strong petitions to the UK Government produced the passing of an anti-dumping law and production from the factory picked up.

In 1968 General Time of the United States, (which owned the Westclox brand name) was bought out by Talley Industries, also located in the U.S. The new owner, Talley Industries, was also a manufacturer of timing equipment, such as clocking-in units, automobile air bag modules and other devices. However, there was no overlap with the Dumbarton product range.

In the 1970s and early 1980s Westclox in Scotland was booming. In 1971 the factory was filmed by the BBC for the preparation of a visit by Her Majesty, The Queen, His Royal Highness, The Duke of Edinburgh and Her Royal Highness, The Princess Anne. The visit made front page news in the Scottish-based newspapers.

In October 1974 the factory hosted a Space Seminar for the astronaut Neil Armstrong and British astronomer Sir Patrick Moore. Both visited the Scottish factory to promote the introduction of 'Quartz' time-keeping. The Westclox Scotland plant in Dumbarton became the Headquarters of General Time (International Operations) Ltd in 1976.

The advent of Quartz clock technology, developed largely by General Time for use in the Apollo 11 Command Module, resulted in the reduction of mechanical clock production and sales, and the factory closed in 1988.

== Present day ==
Following closure, the former Westclox factory building in Dumbarton was converted, and is now home to many small businesses.
