= Micro (watches) =

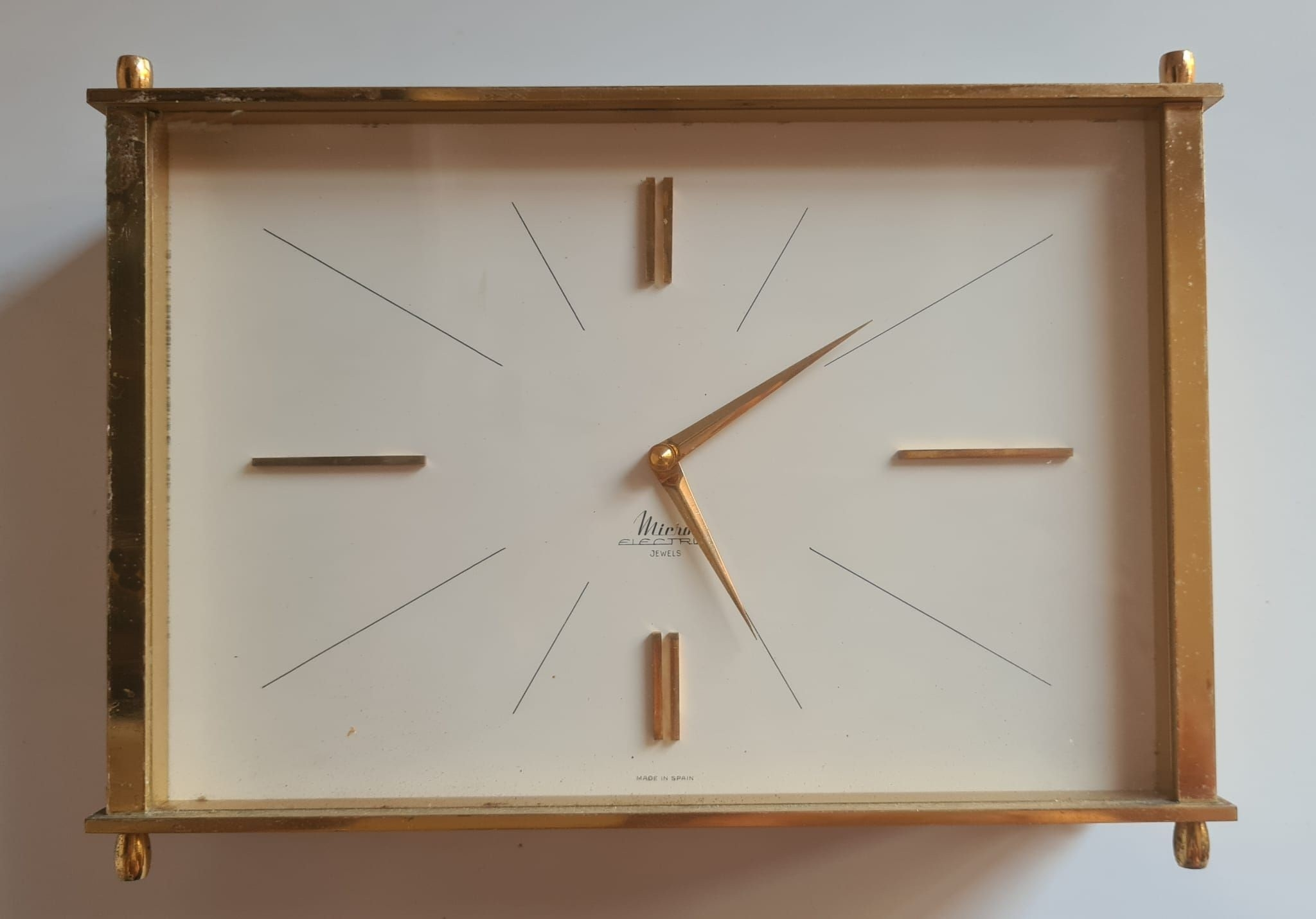
- Website: Relojes Micro

The company Relojes Micro, founded previously but known at least since 1956 by its trademark Micro, is a Spanish historical manufacturer of alarm clocks, mantel clocks, wristwatches, automatic watches, specializing in pouch alarm clocks for many years, being one of the leading companies in the sector in Spain.

== History ==
Throughout the years, the company made an important contribution to the world of watchmaking, by producing a wide range of alarm clocks, manufacturing the cases in its Spanish factory, it assembled Swiss movements until the 1970s. After that, like most Spanish brands of that time, manufacturing was abandoned, using Asian movements. At the decade of 1990s began to include wristwatches with quartz movements. In 2012 they relaunched the brand, expanding the range of watches, and currently the quartz movements are mainly Japanese, together with some Chinese automatic movements.

Finally, it was acquired by Comercial Ferreiro SA, with its headquarters, a typical building, the "Edificio MICRO", at 60th Avenida Trueba in Madrid, which has the logo MICRO on the façade.

== Bibliography ==
- Barquero, José Daniel. (2008). Diccionario de relojes. Colección en hora (in Spanish). Furtwangen Editores. ISBN 978-84-936340-1-8.
- Barquero, J.D. (2005). TODO SOBRE LOS RELOJES DE BOLSILLO: De la decisión de compra a la catalogación (in Spanish). Amat Editorial. ISBN 978-84-9735-250-5.
- Cabrero, J.D.B.; Barquero, J.D. (2004). ENCICLOPEDIA DEL RELOJ DE BOLSILLO: Historia, catalogación, mecánica y detalles de las mayores colecciones públicas, privadas y museos internacionales (in Spanish). Amat Editorial. ISBN 978-84-9735-189-8.
