= St Mark's Clock =

Clock tower in Venice, Italy

Coordinates: 45°26′05″N 12°20′20″E

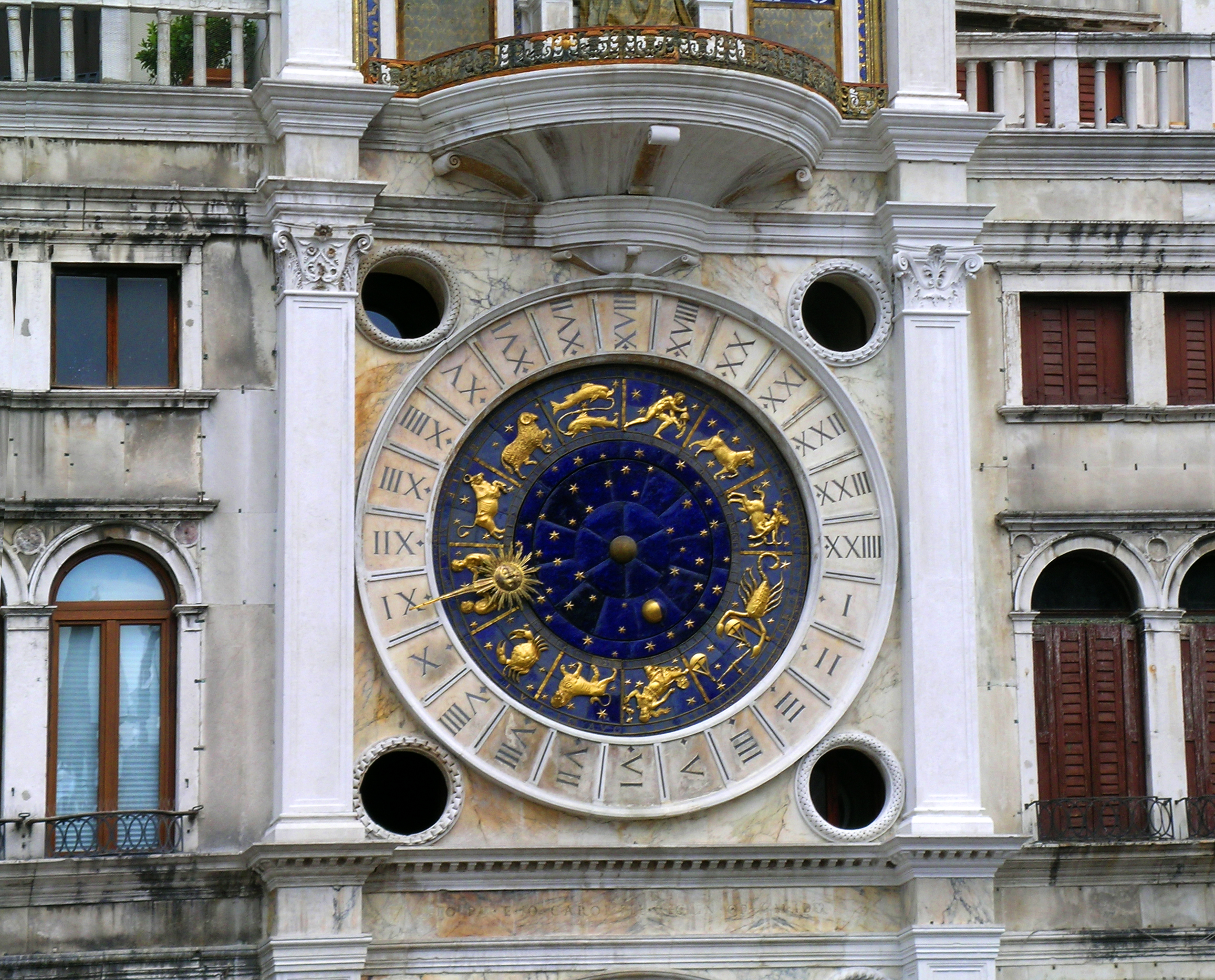
The clock face after restoration (2006)

St Mark's Clock is housed in the Clock Tower on the Piazza San Marco (Saint Mark's Square) in Venice, Italy, adjoining the Procuratie Vecchie. The first clock housed in the tower was built and installed by Gian Paolo and Gian Carlo Ranieri, father and son, between 1496 and 1499, and was one of a number of large public astronomical clocks erected throughout Europe during the 14th and 15th centuries. The clock has had an eventful horological history, and been the subject of many restorations, some controversial.

After restorations in 1551 by Giuseppe Mazzoleni, and in 1615, by Giovanni Battista Santi, the clock mechanism was almost completely replaced in the 1750s, by Bartolomeo Ferracina. In 1858 the clock was restored by Luigi De Lucia. In 1996, a major restoration, undertaken by Giuseppe Brusa and Alberto Gorla, was the subject of controversy, amid claims of unsympathetic restoration and poor workmanship.

== History ==
=== Original construction ===
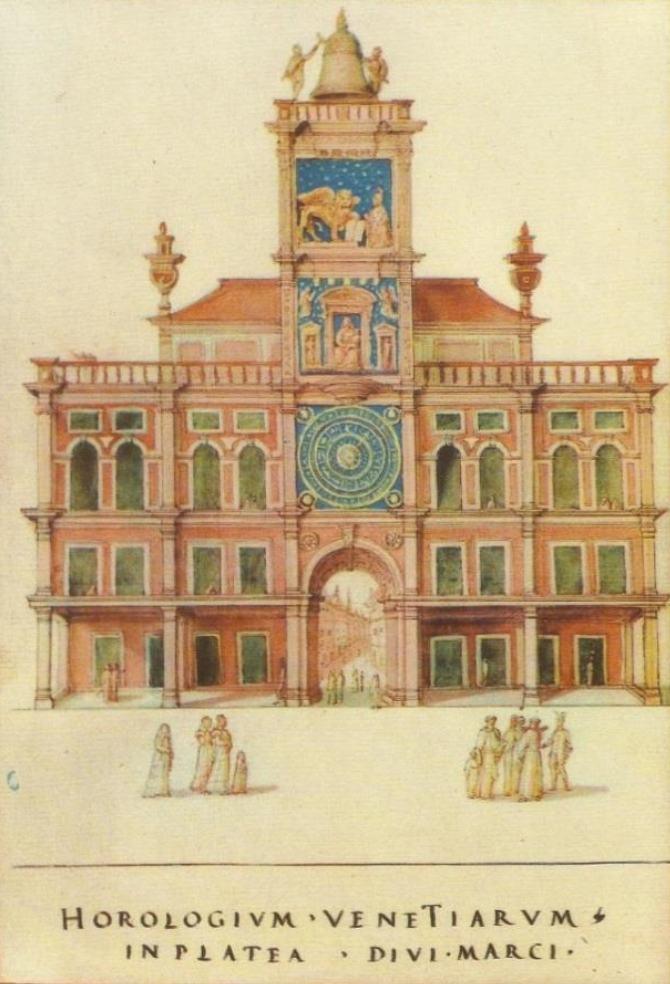
The clocktower in c. 1538–1540, as drawn by Francisco de Holanda

In 1493, the Venetian Republic commissioned Giovan Paolo Ranieri to make a clock movement. He had already constructed clocks in his home town of Reggio Emilia in 1481. Construction of the tower started in 1496, and by December 1497 the great bell had been completed by Simone Camponato and installed on the top, with the two bronze figures of shepherds, each 2.5m high, who hit the bell with hammers. These figures are referred to as Moors because of the dark colour of the bronze patina. Paolo died in 1498 and his son Gian Carlo completed the work.

The clock was inaugurated on February 1, 1497. Driven by weights, with a foliot escapement, the clock controlled both the bell-ringing shepherds on the tower, who would have rung the bell between 1 and 24 times to sound the Italian hours, and a carousel which showed the procession of the Magi, preceded by an angel blowing a trumpet.

The dial was a concentric-ring astronomical clock similar to the clock of the Torre dell'Orologio, Padua of 1434, rather than the astrolabe type with offset zodiac dial, as found at Prague. The 24 hours of the day were marked, in Roman numerals, around the edge, with I at the right-hand side, and marked Italian hours. The relative positions of five planets (Saturn, Jupiter, Mars, Venus, and Mercury) were shown, as were the moon's phases and the position of the Sun in the zodiac. The four circular windows around the dial may have contained astrolabe-type devices or orreries.

The Venetian Government paid Ranieri and his family to live in the Clock Tower and maintain the clock in good order. He was the first clock-keeper or 'temperatore', and this post continued to be filled, often by different generations of the same family, until 1998.

Repairs and restorations have been frequent. In 1550 there were accusations that some of the gears had been stolen and sold.

=== Ferracina's rebuild ===
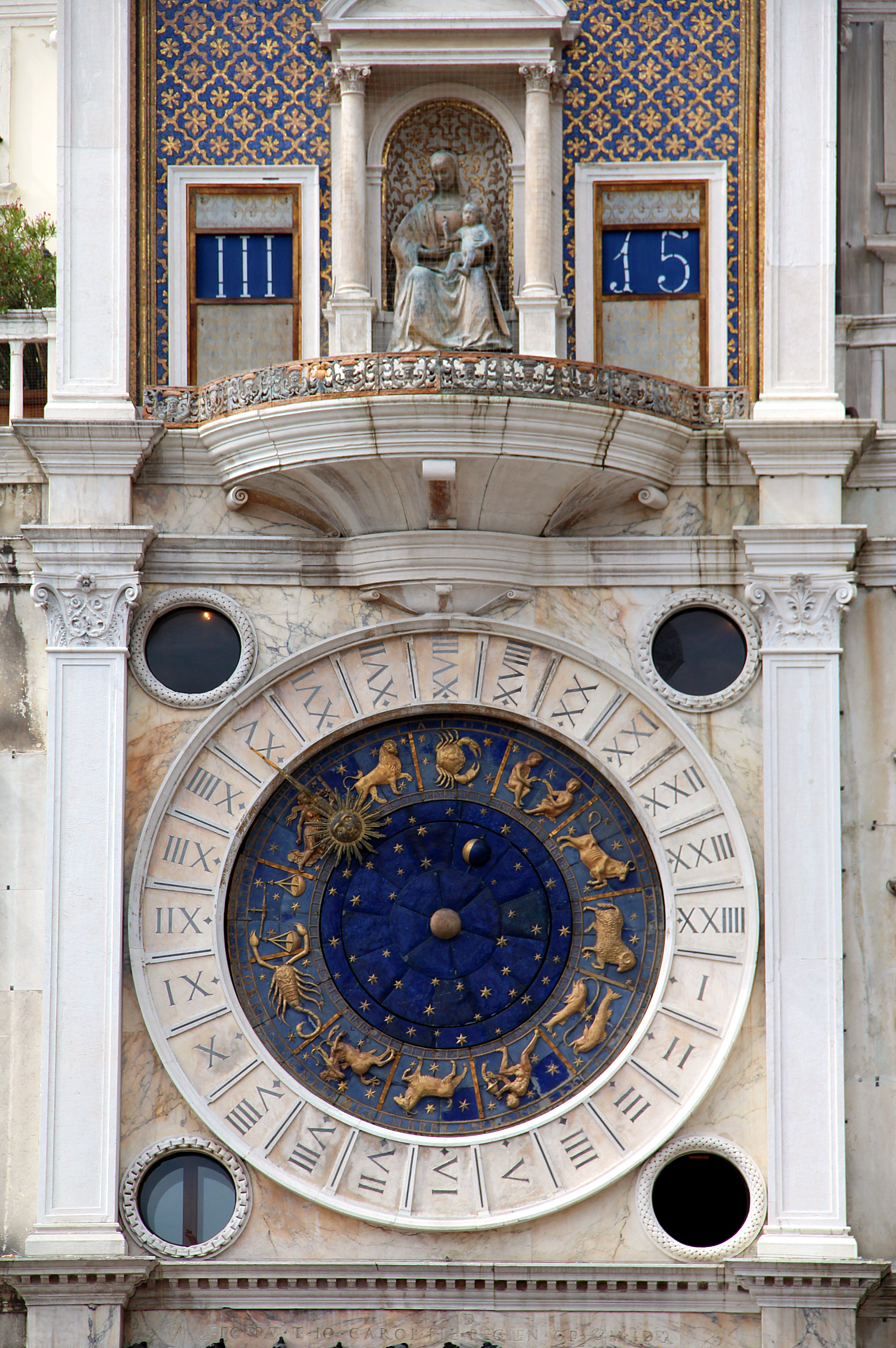

In 1752 Bartolomeo Ferracina started work on replacing the clock, having successfully tendered for the job in public competition. He installed a new movement, removed the planetary dials, installed a rotating moon ball to show the phase, and changed the numbering of the clock face from the old Italian style (I to XXIIII in Roman numerals) to the 12-hour style, using two sets of Arabic numerals, with 12 at the top and bottom of the dial. He received the old mechanism and dial as part of his payment.

Ferracina's new movement reflected the great advances in horology that had been made since the original clock had been installed. A Graham dead-beat escapement replaced the foliot, with a 4m pendulum, mounted away from the central arbor, beating once every 1.97 seconds. The new striking system used a new pair of hammers that struck six groups of 22 blows at 12:00 and 0:00 on the great bell on the tower. Ferracina also restored the Magi procession, which then was restricted to occurring only on 15 days of the year around Ascension Day.

=== De Lucia's restoration ===
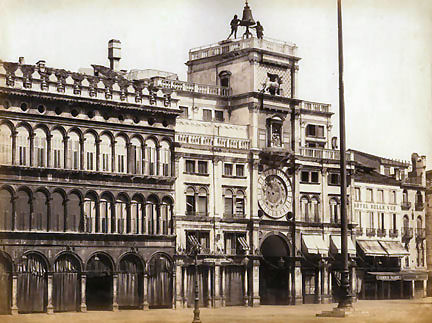
St Mark's Clocktower (Torre dell'Orologio), c.1860/70, by Carlo Ponti.

In 1857 Luigi de Lucia started another restoration, and added a digital display. For this he installed two large wheels just behind the doors through which the Magi procession appeared and disappeared, and on each of these wheels he mounted 12 large pierced metal sheets with glass inlays, one to show Roman numerals from I to XII and the other to show Arabic numerals from 0 to 55 in steps of 5. These were illuminated from behind by gas lamps, so that the numbers could be seen from the square below. During the Magi procession, the wheels were lifted away from the doors to allow the statues to pass through, and the temperatore changed the numbers manually.

De Lucia modified the escapement, replacing it with a pinwheel, and lengthened the pendulum to beat at 2 seconds.

In 1896, the Arabic numerals installed by Ferracina were removed, and the original Roman numerals showing the Italian numbering were revealed again.

In 1915, the complex 132-strike mechanism was disabled, due to the wartime curfew.

Today the clock displays the original I to XXIIII numbering around the outside, with I at the right hand side. The gilded stars are purely decorative. The signs of the zodiac are in anticlockwise order around the inner zodiac dial: the zodiac wheel rotates clockwise with the hour hand but very slightly faster. As a result, the hour hand moves slowly anticlockwise relative to the zodiac, so that it passes through each sign in the course of the year.

=== Brusa and Gorla's restoration ===
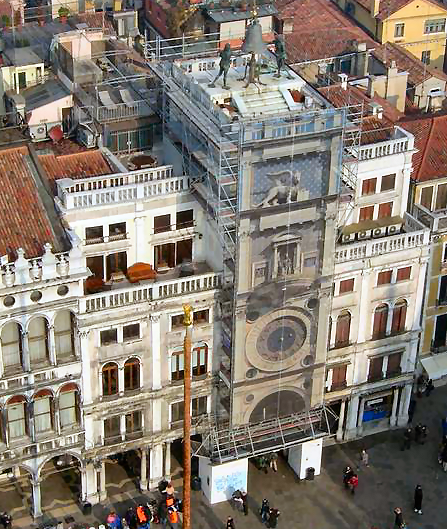
St Mark's Clocktower undergoing restoration in 2004.

In 1996, another restoration was initiated, to be funded by watchmakers Piaget. The Venetian authorities did not submit the job to open tender, but chose Giuseppe Brusa, historian, and Alberto Gorla, clock mechanic, directly. In 1997 important restoration work on the tower began, and the clock was dismantled and restored by Brusa and Gorla. The mechanism was on display in the Ducal Palace in 2001.

Articles written by Renato and Franco Zamberlan, and published in the British Horological Journal in 2001, accuse Brusa and Gorla of poor choices, unsound restoration methodology and inappropriate workmanship. The restoration was also criticized by Alberto Peratoner, who was the incumbent temperatore when the post was abolished in 1998.

The restorers undid some of the changes made in 1857, changing the pendulum's length and position, for example, although not back to their 1752 condition. Rather than make minimal interventions, as modern conservation practice requires, the restorers made considerable changes to the design. The Zamberlan article also refers to the inappropriate use of galvanized metric hexagonal bolts, and poor quality workmanship.

== References in arts ==
In the 1979 James Bond film Moonraker, Bond battles a bad guy in Venice and ends up throwing him through the face of the clock, which is made of glass in the film, and down into a piano in St Mark's square below, disrupting an opera performance. The real clock was not used, and in fact its face consists of revolving metal disks and its mechanism is quite different from that seen behind it in the movie. A glass-fronted studio-based "stunt double" was used for the filming.

The clock that was taken as a basis for the design when this came to be filmed (in 1978) in studios in Paris is a Meybaum clock c. 1786, which is actually located in the Strasbourg Museum of Decorative Arts. It was lent to United Artists to serve as the basis for the mock-up. United Artists had contacted the Ungerer clock company to see about such a loan, and it was Ungerer who came up with the idea of the museum clock.

== See also ==
- Astronomical clock

== Sources ==
- King, Henry (1978). Geared to the Stars: the evolution of planetariums, orreries, and astronomical clocks. University of Toronto Press. ISBN 9780802023124.
- Zamberlan, Renato and Franco (January 2001). "The St Mark's Clock, Venice". Horological Journal.
