= St Mark's Clocktower =

Renaissance clock tower in Venice, Italy

Coordinates: 45.43471°N 12.338912°E

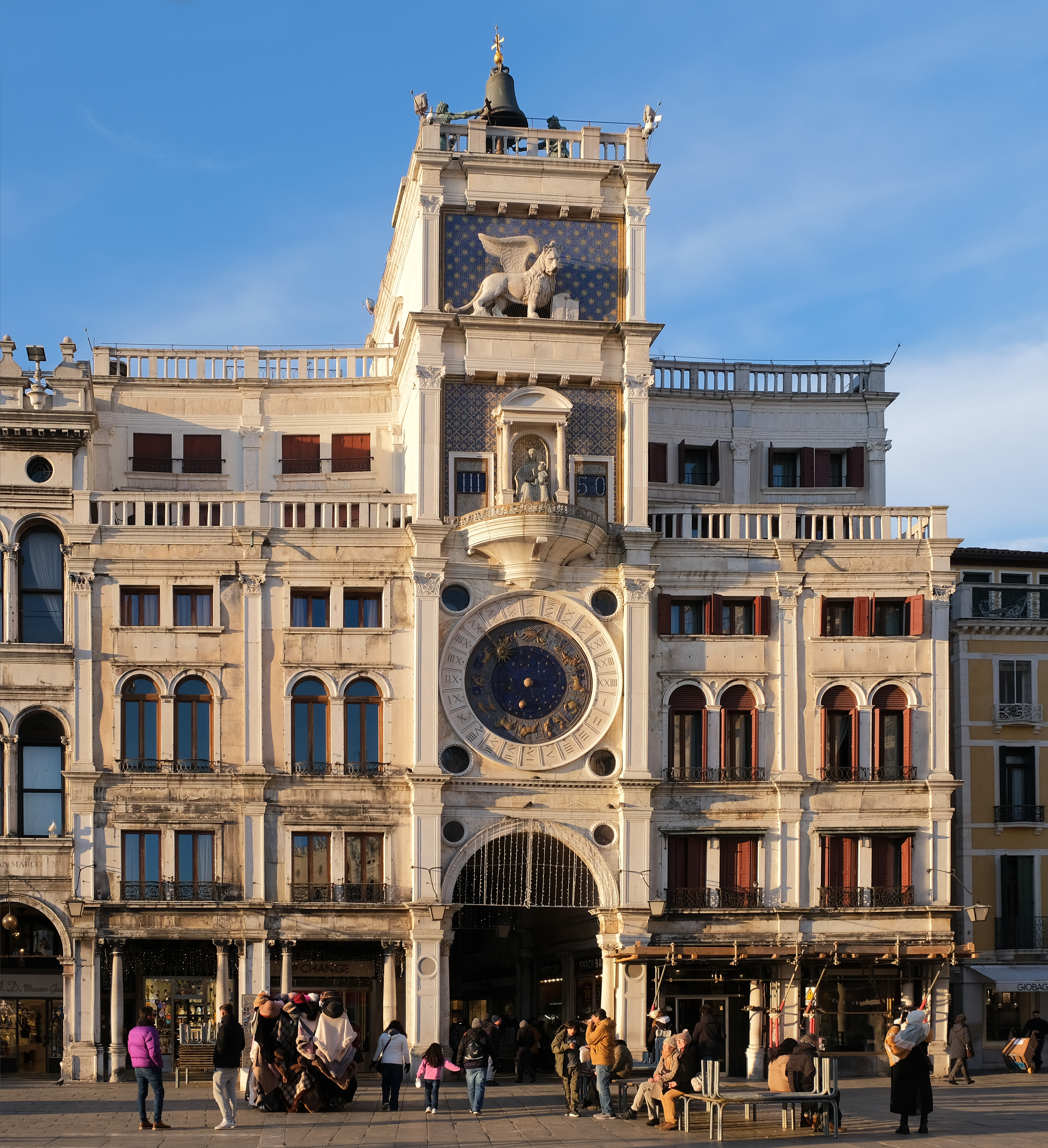
The Clock Tower in 2024

The Clock Tower (Italian: Torre dell'Orologio) in Venice is an early Renaissance building on the north side of the Piazza San Marco, at the entrance to the Merceria. It comprises a tower, which contains the clock, and lower buildings on each side. It adjoins the eastern end of the Procuratie Vecchie. Both the tower and the clock date from the last decade of the 15th century, though the mechanism of the clock has subsequently been much altered. It was placed where the clock would be visible from the waters of the lagoon and give notice to everyone of the wealth and glory of Venice. The lower two floors of the tower make a monumental archway into the main street of the city, the Merceria, which linked the political and religious centre (the Piazza) with the commercial and financial centre (the Rialto). Today it is one of the 11 venues managed by the Fondazione Musei Civici di Venezia.

== General description ==
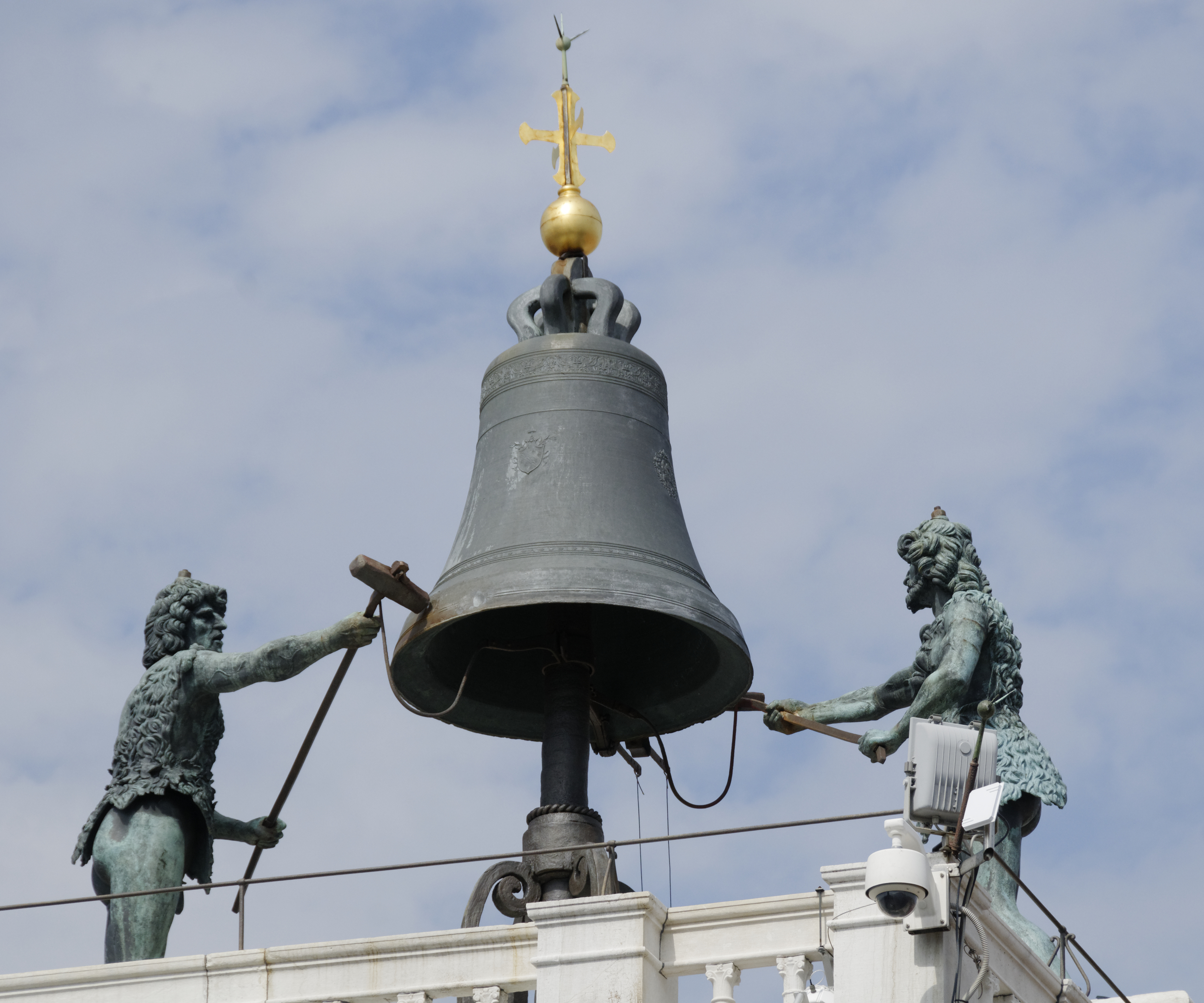
The "Moors" striking the hours at the top of the Torre dell’Orologio.

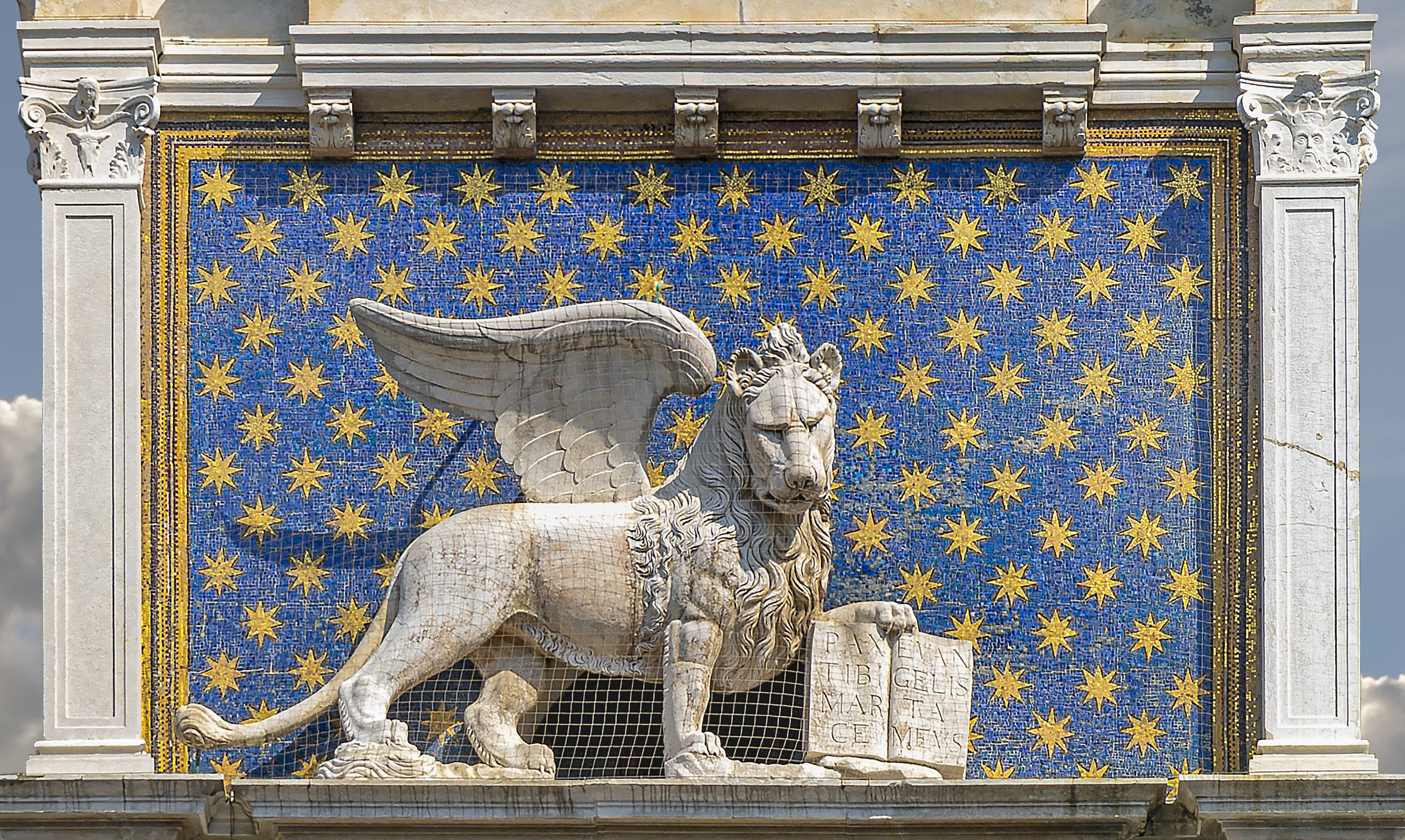
Lion of Saint Mark at the Torre dell’Orologio.

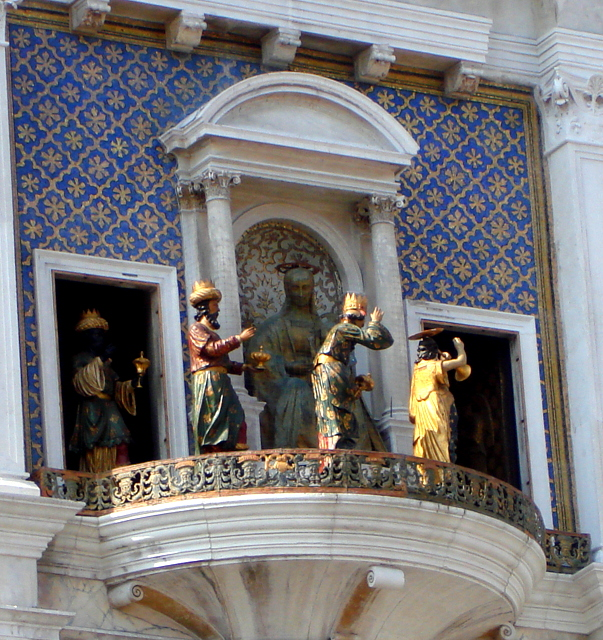
The Three Magi led by an angel that emerge only twice a year

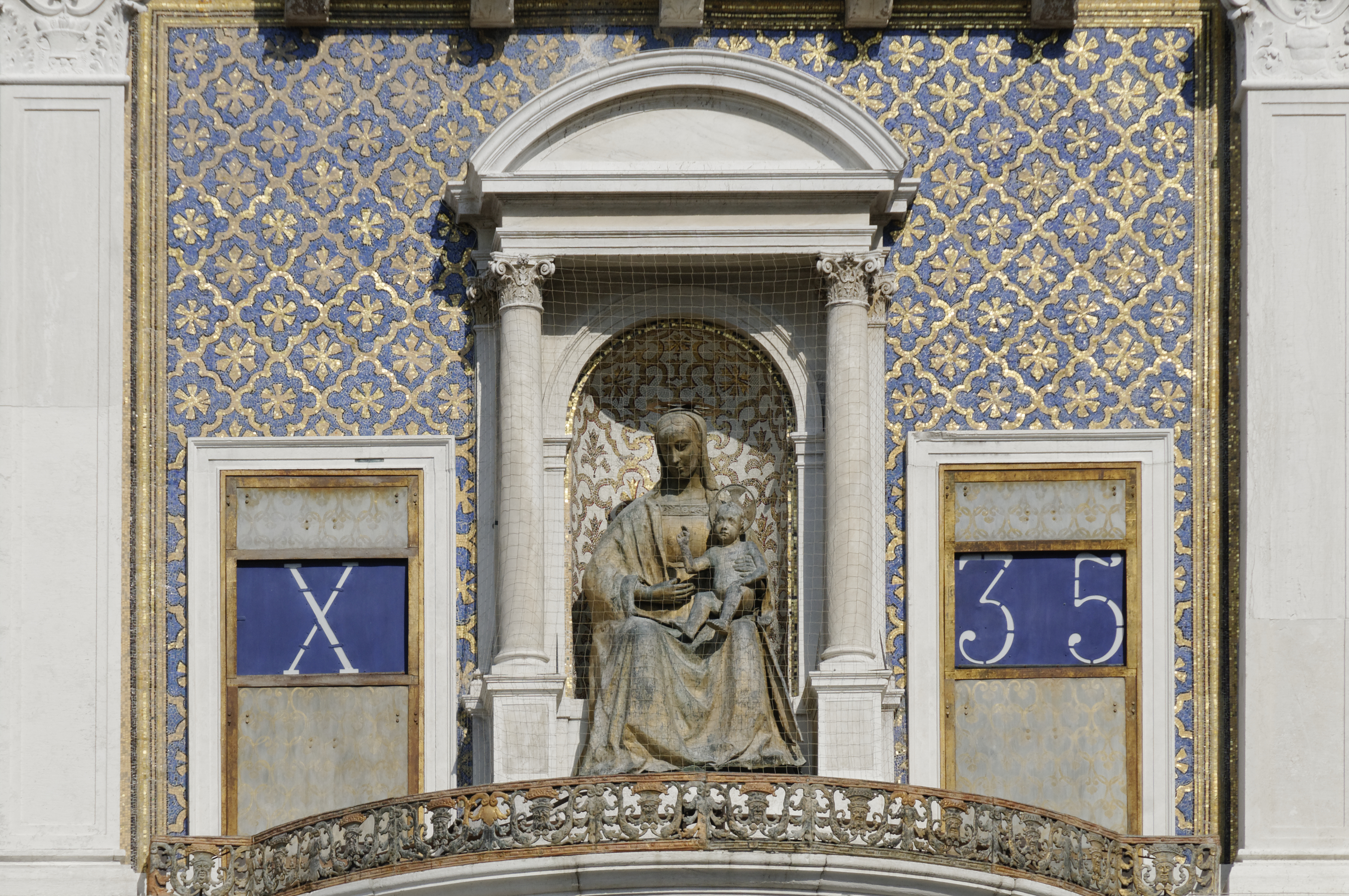
The gallery with the Virgin and Child and two blue panels showing the time

On a terrace at the top of the tower are two great bronze figures, hinged at the waist, which strike the hours on a bell. One is old and the other young, to show the passing of time and, although said to represent shepherds (they are wearing sheepskins) or giants (they are huge figures of great mass, necessary so that their form can be recognized at a distance) they are known as "the Moors" because of the dark patina acquired by the bronze. The bell is also original and is signed by Simeone Campanato, who cast it at the Arsenal in 1497.

Below this level is the winged Lion of Saint Mark with the open book, before a blue background with gold stars. There was originally a statue of the Doge Agostino Barbarigo (Doge 1486–1501) kneeling before the lion, but in 1797, after the city had surrendered to Napoleon, it was removed by the French, who were purging the city of all symbols of the old regime.

Below again, is a semi-circular gallery with statues of the Virgin and Child seated, in gilt beaten copper. On either side are two large blue panels showing the time: the hour on the left in Roman numerals and the minutes (at 5 minute intervals) on the right in Arabic numerals. Twice a year, at Epiphany (6 January) and on Ascension Day (the Thursday 40 days after Easter, counting both days), the three Magi, led by an angel with a trumpet, emerge from one of the doorways normally taken up by these numbers and pass in procession round the gallery, bowing to the Virgin and child, before disappearing through the other door.

Below this is the great clock face in blue and gold inside a fixed circle of marble engraved with the 24 hours of the day in Roman numerals. A golden pointer with an image of the sun moves round this circle and indicates the hour of the day. Within the marble circle beneath the sun pointer are the signs of the zodiac in gold (these are original and date from the 1490s), which revolve slightly more slowly than the pointer to show the position of the sun in the zodiac. In the middle of the clockface is the earth (in the centre) and the moon, which revolves to show its phases, surrounded by stars which are fixed in position. The background is of blue enamel. The smaller blue circles in the four corners are not now used.

Below the clock is the archway, two storeys high, through which the street known as the Merceria leaves the Piazza on its way to the Rialto (This section of the Merceria is known as the Merceria dell'Orologio (of the clock)).

The buildings on each side have been let off separately as shops and apartments since the early 18th century.

On the other side of the tower, there is another great clock face above the arch, visible to people walking down the street towards the Piazza. This is a simpler affair, again surrounded by a marble circle marked with the 24 hours, but in two series of 12 hours each. The sun pointer, marking the hours, is the only moving part on this side.

== The construction of the tower and the clock ==
By 1490 an old clock at the north-west corner of St Mark's church, the clock of St Alipio, was in a very bad state and in 1493 the Senate commissioned the construction of a new clock. The making of the clock was entrusted to a father and son, Gian Paolo and Gian Carlo Ranieri, of Reggio Emilia In 1495 the Senate decided that a tower to hold the clock should be erected at the point where the street known as the Merceria leaves the Piazza. Buildings were demolished to make room for it and building started in 1496.

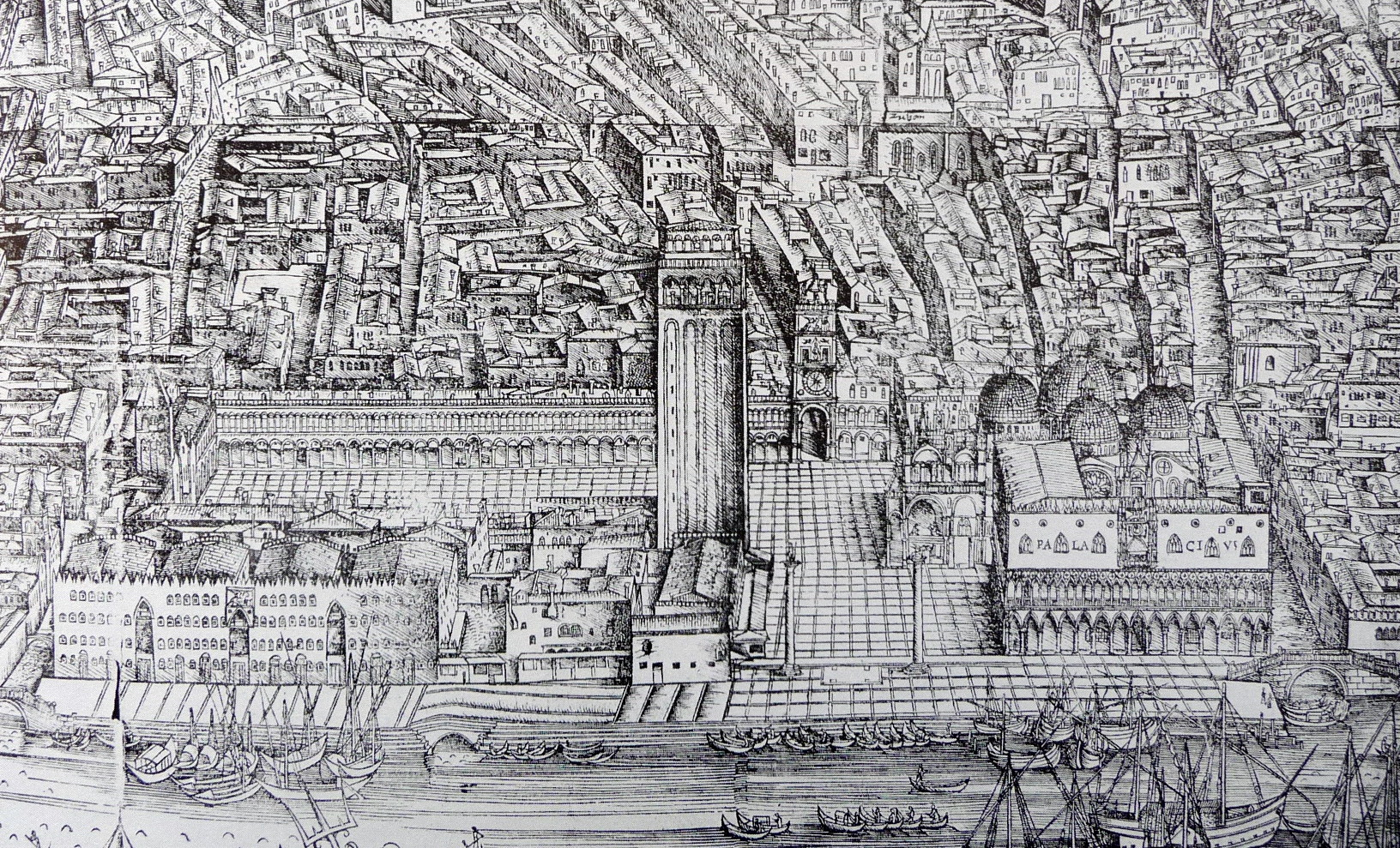
The clocktower in 1500 when it had just been completed (from de Barbari's woodcut of Venice)

The design of the tower is generally attributed on grounds of style (though without documentary evidence) to Mauro Codussi. The Merceria passes through the archway at the foot of the tower. It is one of the principal streets of the city and leads to the Rialto. Deborah Howard explains how the idea was probably derived by Codussi from Alberti's work 'De re aedificatoria' ("About Building"), published earlier in the 15th century, where he emphasises the importance of towers to a city and the appropriateness of a monumental archway as the entrance to its principal street.

The name of the sculptor who modelled the figures of the Moors is not known for certain. They have been most often attributed to Paolo Savin, but an article published in 1984 reached the conclusion that the most likely candidate is Antonio Rizzo. They were cast in bronze in 1494 by Ambrosio Delle Anchor.

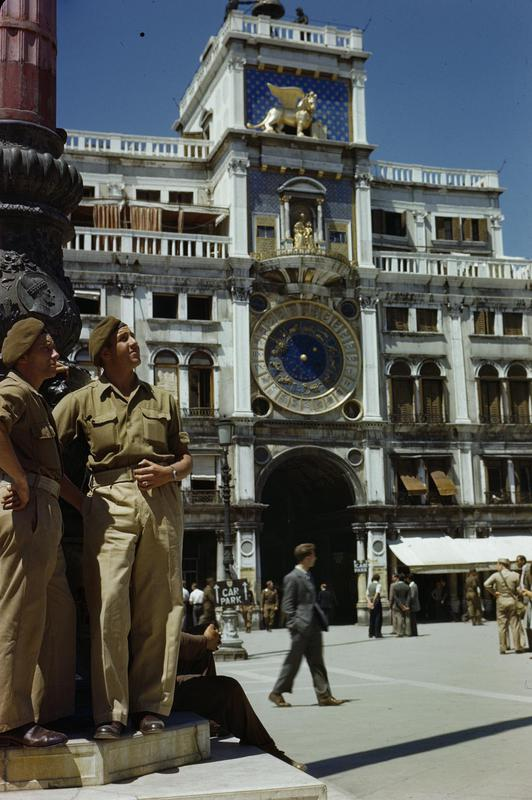
The clock tower in 1945 soon after liberation

The tower was built during 1496 and 1497 and the mechanism of the clock was then built into it under the supervision of the Ranieri. No expense was spared in the decoration of the tower and the clock, using quantities of ultramarine and gold leaf. Even the 'Moors' were originally gilded. The inauguration of both tower and clock took place on 1 February 1499. Sanudo wrote in his diary for this day that the clock was uncovered and seen for the first time as the Doge was leaving the Piazza to go to hear vespers at Sta Maria Formosa, adding that it was made with great ingenuity and was most beautiful. Codussi died in 1504 and the wings on either side of the tower were added by 1506 (perhaps to give greater stability to the whole). Barbari's great woodcut of Venice dated 1500 shows the newly built clock tower before the wings were built, rising high above the original 12th-century Procuratie on either side. These Procuratie were lower than the present buildings, with only one storey above the arches on the ground floor, so that the tower then rose high above all the buildings on that side of the Piazza.

The wings are sometimes attributed to Pietro Lombardi, who was later to rebuild the Procuratie on the same side of the Piazza, but the wings are of no great distinction and more probably designed by Gonella who was then the proto (buildings manager) of St Mark's. The wings were also originally two storeys lower than today, with the roof at the level of the existing terraces. A drawing by Canaletto shows the tower before the increase in the height of the wings. This makes the tower itself appear higher so that it makes a more positive statement as the grand entrance to a great city.

By 1500, when the final account for the tower was passed, the elder Raineri had died. It was arranged that his son should remain in Venice to look after the clock and he was granted flour concessions which would give him a good income. He lived in Venice until his death in 1531.

== Alterations to the building and clock ==
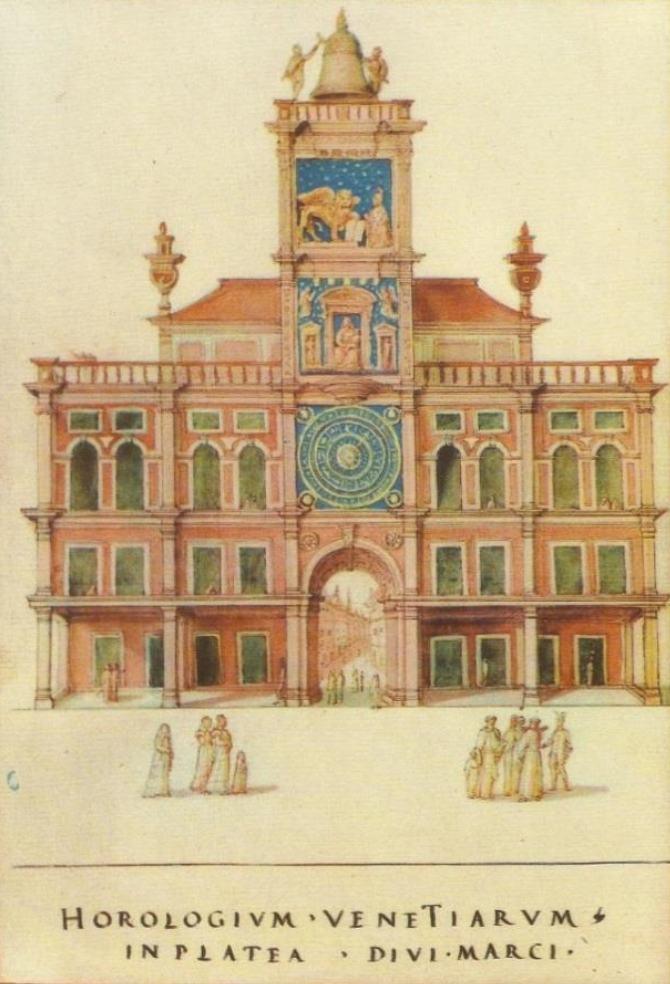
The tower in c. 1538–40, as drawn by Francisco de Holanda

For more detailed and technical information about the clock, see the separate article on the clock.

By 1531, after the death of Carlo Raineri, the clock was already not working properly. The Council of Ten decided that a permanent keeper must be appointed to live in a wing of the tower and be responsible to keep the clock in working order. Later, in 1551, Jacopo Sansovino, then the architect responsible for St Mark's, was instructed to report on the state of the tower and clock. Major repairs were required, but by 1581, when his son, Francesco, published his description of Venice, all appears to have been in order.

Shortly before 1663 the clock face was cleaned and the blue and gold colours restored 'like new'. Already by this date the procession of the Magi did not take place daily but only at certain festivals and also every hour of the day on every day while the Ascension Day celebrations lasted.

By 1750 both tower and clock were badly in need of repair and restoration. In 1751 Giorgio Massari was employed to restore the buildings. In 1755 work started to add two additional floors above the roof terraces of the wings on either side of the tower. Andrea Camerata took over from Massari in 1757. The eight columns on the front of the ground floor were added in that year, presumably for extra strength.

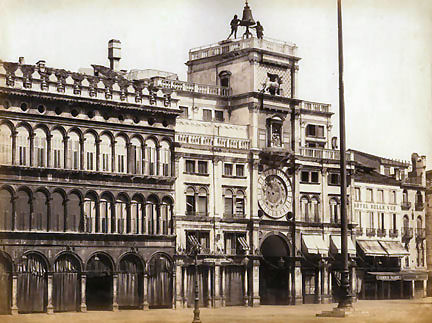
St Mark's Clocktower (Torre dell'Orologio), c.1860/70, by Carlo Ponti

Bartolomeo Ferracina was chosen to restore the clock mechanism. He made very extensive alterations, changing the movement from a foliot escapement to a pendulum system, which was much more accurate. The bands in the clock face which had previously shown the apparent movement of the planets round a central earth were removed. The marble circle round the clock face which had been marked, as now, with 24 hours, was covered by a circle showing two series of 12 hours and the Moors were also made to strike the bell in 12-hour cycles, with special rings involving 132 strokes of the bell, at midday and midnight. These changes were complete by 1757. Ferracina then turned his attention to the procession of the Magi, which had apparently not worked for many years, and the new mechanism was inaugurated on Ascension Day 1759. In order to prevent undue wear and tear, this continued to work only during the fortnight after Ascension Day.

By 1855 repairs were needed again. The top floor of the tower was reinforced and staircases were replaced by iron stairs. In 1858 Luigi de Lucia repaired and made further alterations in the clock mechanism, but preserving the essentials of the changes which had been made by Ferracina.

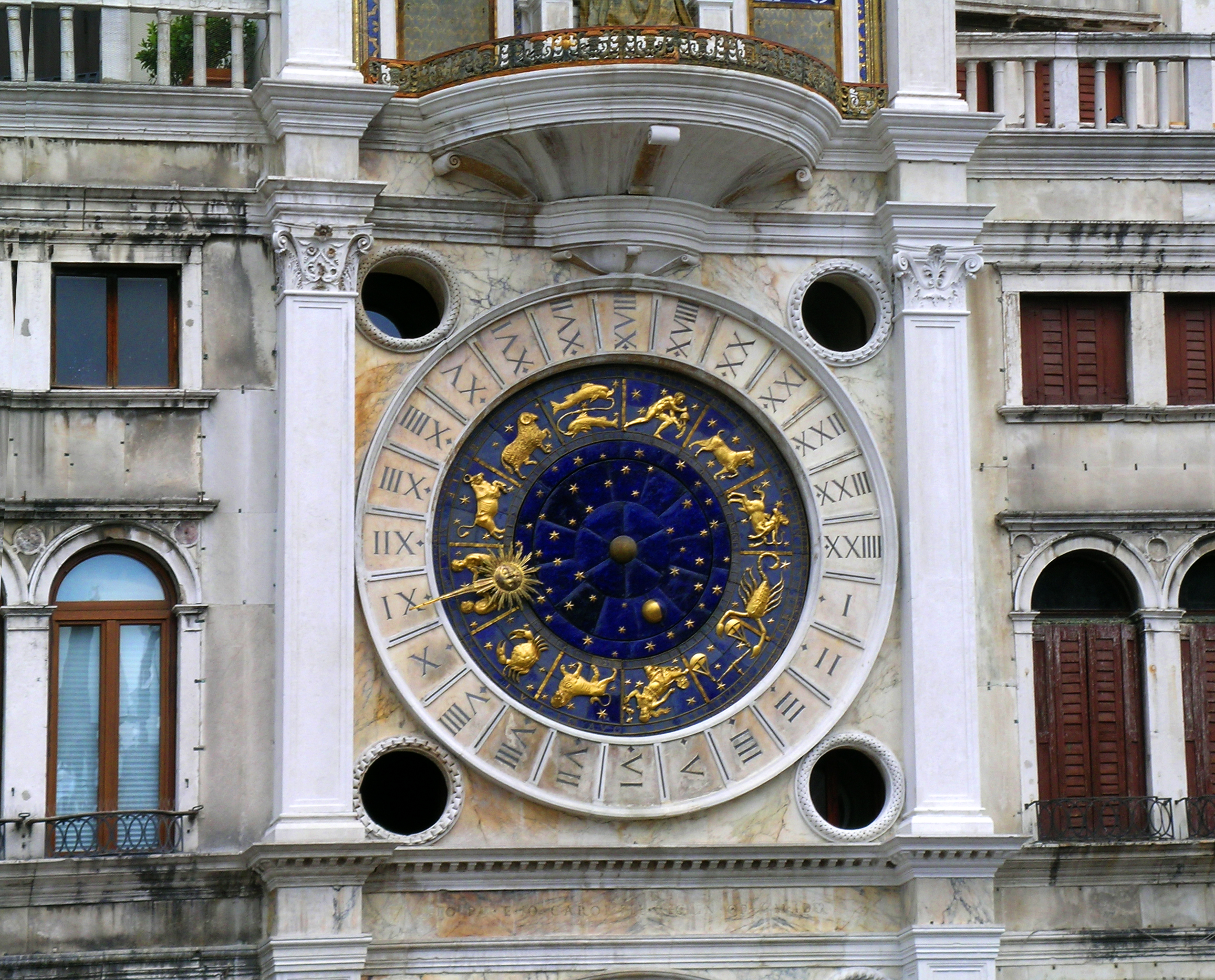
The clock face after restoration (2006)

At this time a completely new feature was added, so that the time could be read more accurately than was previously possible. Panels were made to appear in the doorways on either side of the Virgin and child, above the clock face. Those on the left show the hour while those on the right show the minutes (changing every 5 minutes), each with white letters on a blue background. The numbers blocked the route of the Magi and additional machinery was designed to lift them out of the way when the processions took place. They originally had gas lights behind them so that they could be read at night. The mechanism operating these numbers caused trouble and was not working properly until 1866. Other improvements and alterations were also made in 1865/66 by Antonio Trevisan and Vincenzo Emo.

The two 12-hour cycles round the main face of the clock remained until about 1900 when the original 24-hour circle was discovered beneath them and they were removed.

Further adjustments were made in 1953 and the latest, extensive series of repairs and alterations (some causing controversy amongst horologists) were carried out from 1998 to 2006 (five hundred years after the tower and clock were first completed).

== Visits to the clock tower ==
Stairways (steep and narrow) inside the building give access to the terrace on the roof, passing the clock mechanism on the way. Tours (in Italian, English and French) must be booked in advance.

== Miscellaneous ==
The Kroch High-rise in Leipzig, Germany is modelled after St Mark's Clocktower.
