= Hôtel de Ville, Benfeld =

Hôtel de Ville de Benfeld
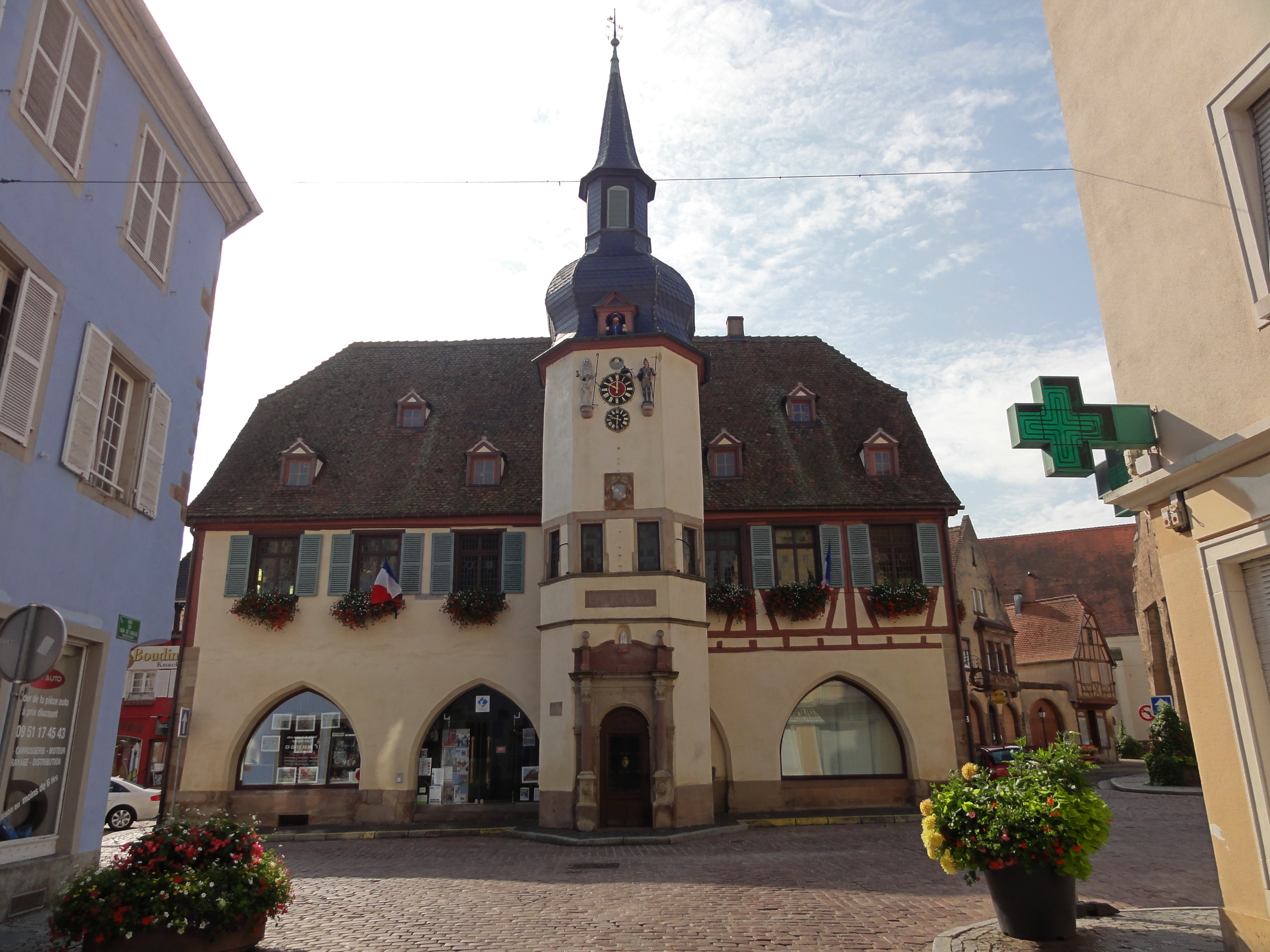
- The Hôtel de Ville in 2014
- Former names: Rathaus Benfeld
- Alternative names: Laube

General information
- Type: City hall
- Architectural style: Renaissance architecture
- Classification: Monument historique
- Location: 1, place de la République; 67230 Benfeld, Benfeld, France
- Coordinates: 48.3691°N 7.59498°E
- Construction started: 1531
- Completed: 1619
- Renovated: 1865

Technical details
- Floor count: 4

Design and construction
- Architect: Ascagne Albertini

Monument historique
- Official name: Hôtel de ville
- Type: Inscrit
- Designated: 1929
- Reference no.: PA00084605

Hôtel de Ville de Benfeld is a Renaissance city hall in Benfeld, a small town of the Bas-Rhin department of France. It is classified as a Monument historique by the French Ministry of Culture since 1929, in particular because of its 17th-century automaton clock.

== History and description ==
Also known as Laube (short for German: Gerichtslaube, medieval arcade-covered courthouse, see Gerichtslaube), the city hall's core building was the place where the Schultheiß passed judgment. This part of the town hall (1531) is built in the traditional timber framing style of Alsace, with the conspicuous arcades at the ground floor. In 1619, a clock tower featuring an ornate main portal and three jacquemarts was added by Ascagne Albertini, lord of Ichtratzheim, bailiff of Benfeld, and military engineer. The three statues are the work of the Strasbourg sculptor Johann Fröbe; they are made of oak and represent Prudence (in the shape of Leopold V, Archduke of Austria dressed as a soldier and holding a halberd), Death (with an hourglass and a scythe), and Justice (in the shape of a Schultheiß with a stick and a full purse). The three clock faces indicate the Paris time (main clockface), the Strasbourg time (smaller clock face below) and the lunar phases (above the main clock face). Those two latter faces were added in 1856 by master clockmaker Jean-Baptiste Schwilgué.

== Gallery ==
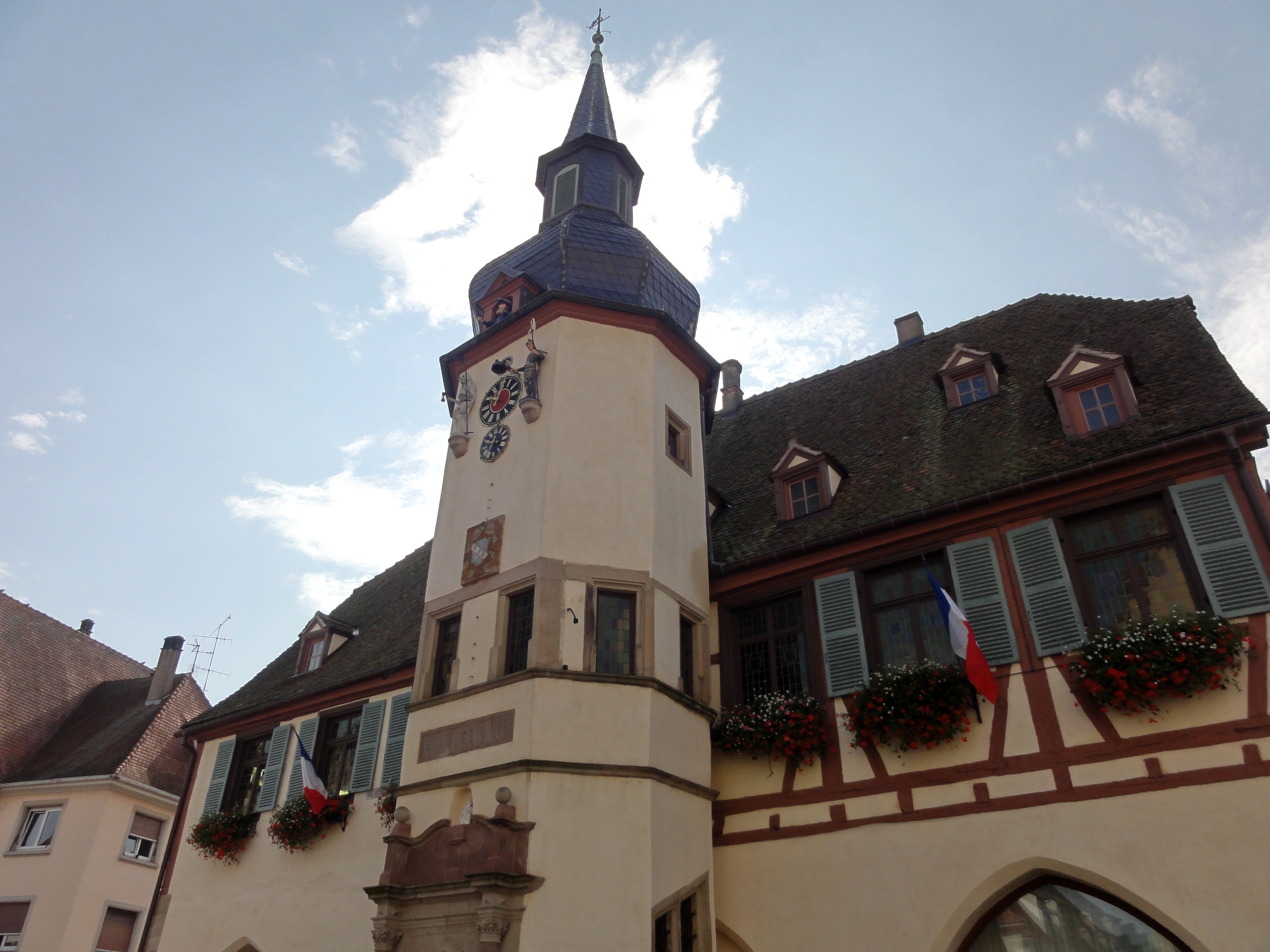
The clocktower

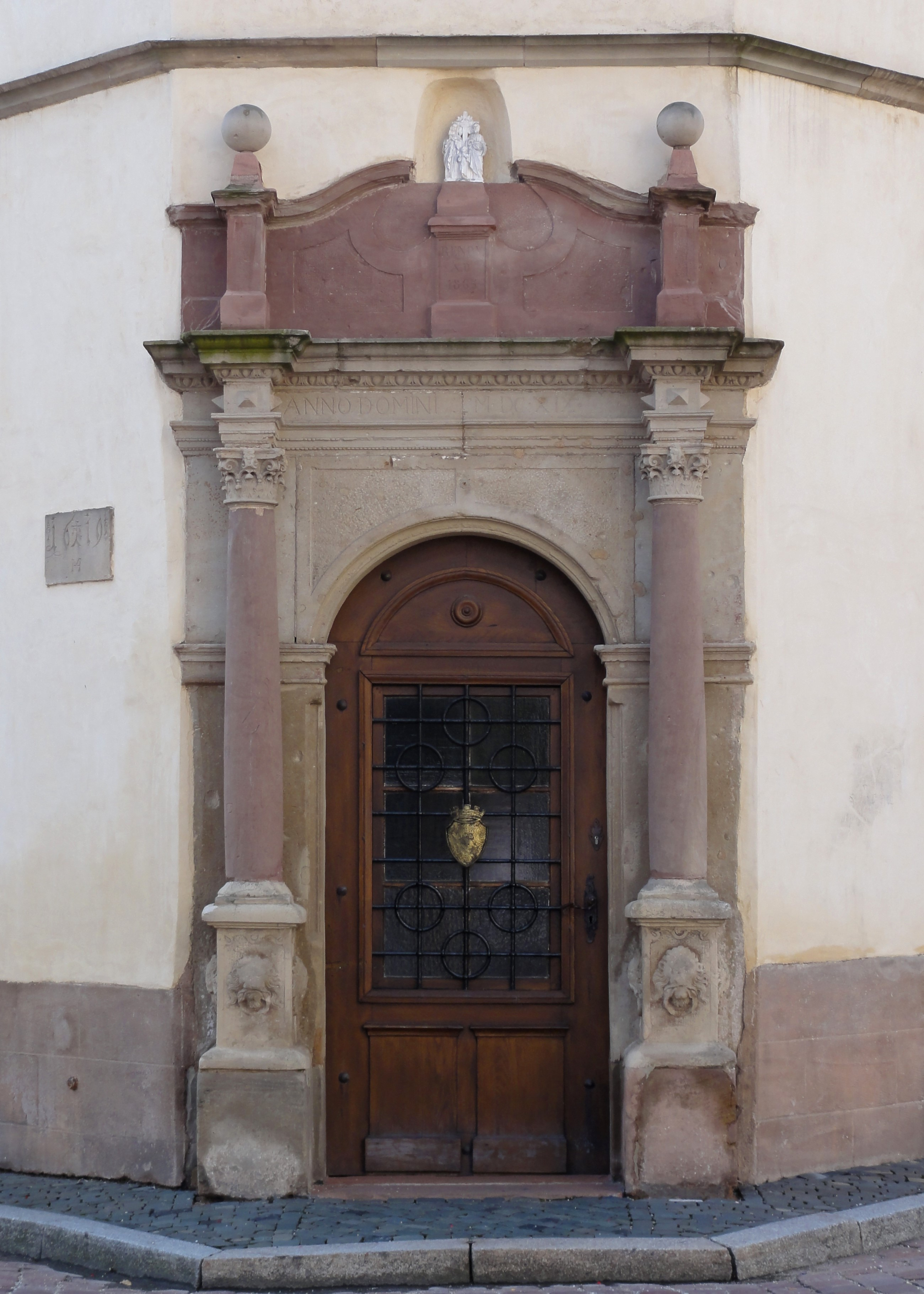
Main portal with dates "1619", ANNO DOMINI MDCXIX (1619), and "Renov. A. D. 1865"

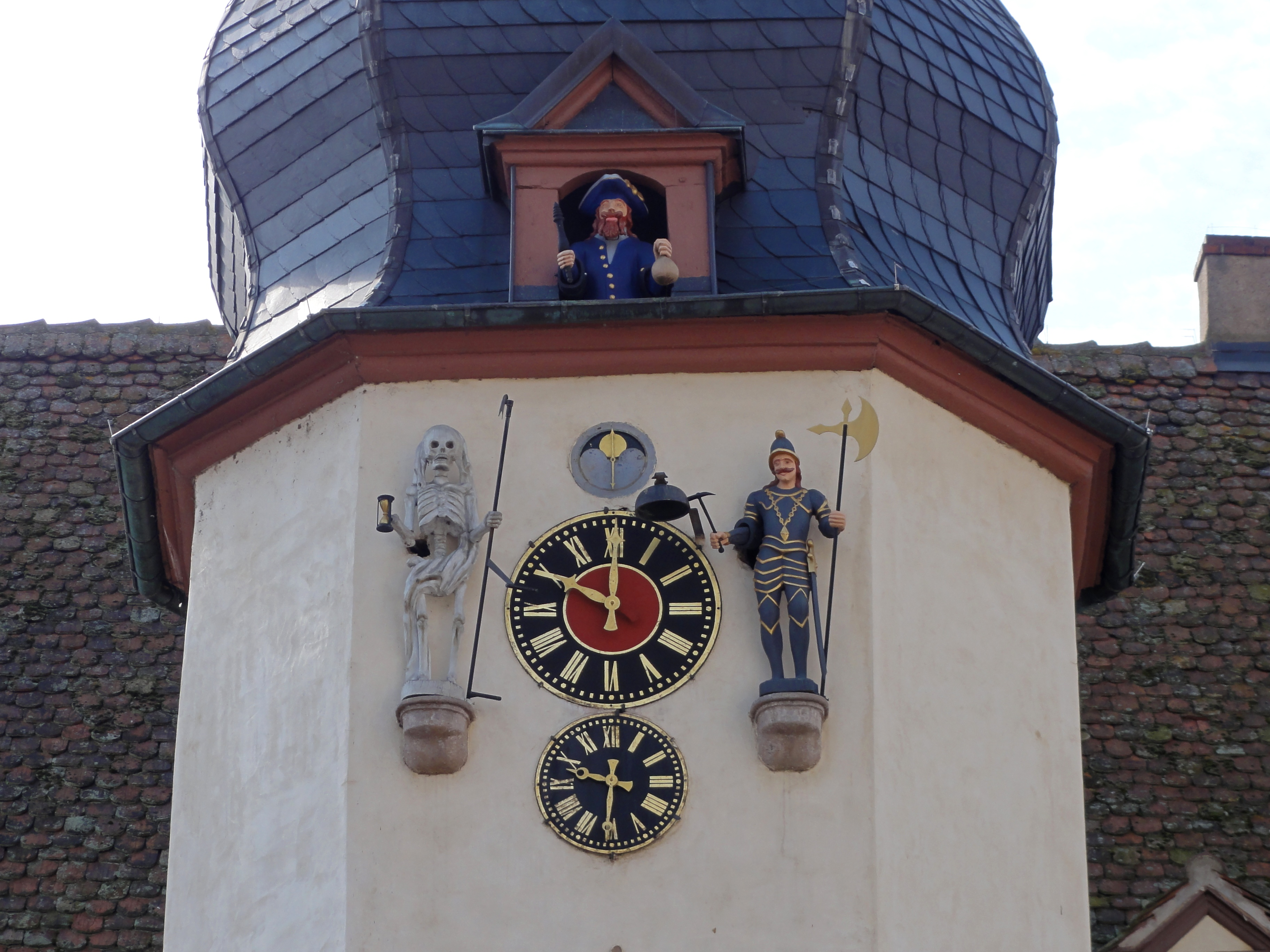
Clocks with jacquemart

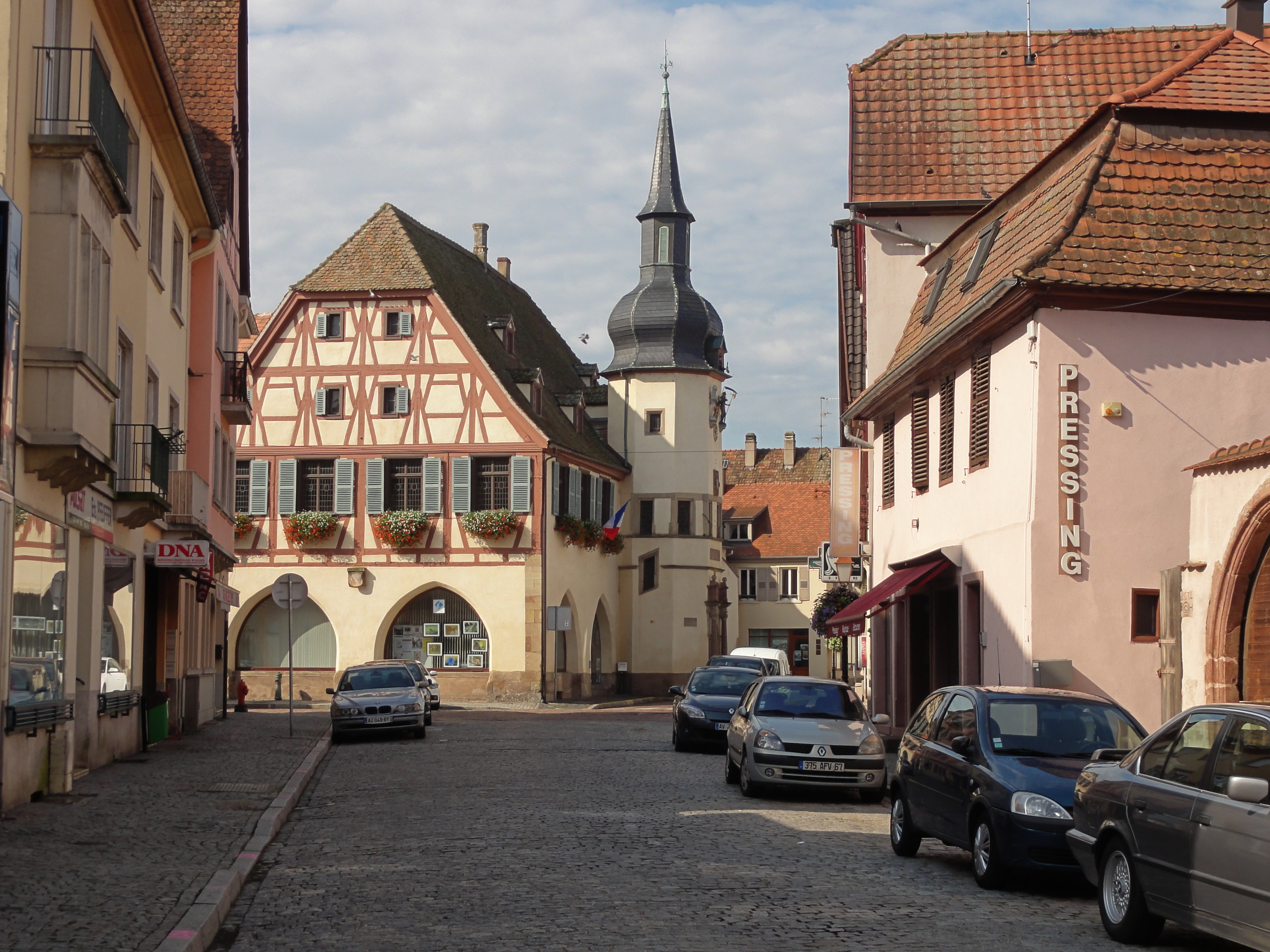
Lateral view of the town hall through Rue Clemenceau
