= Musical clock =

Clock that marks time with a musical tune

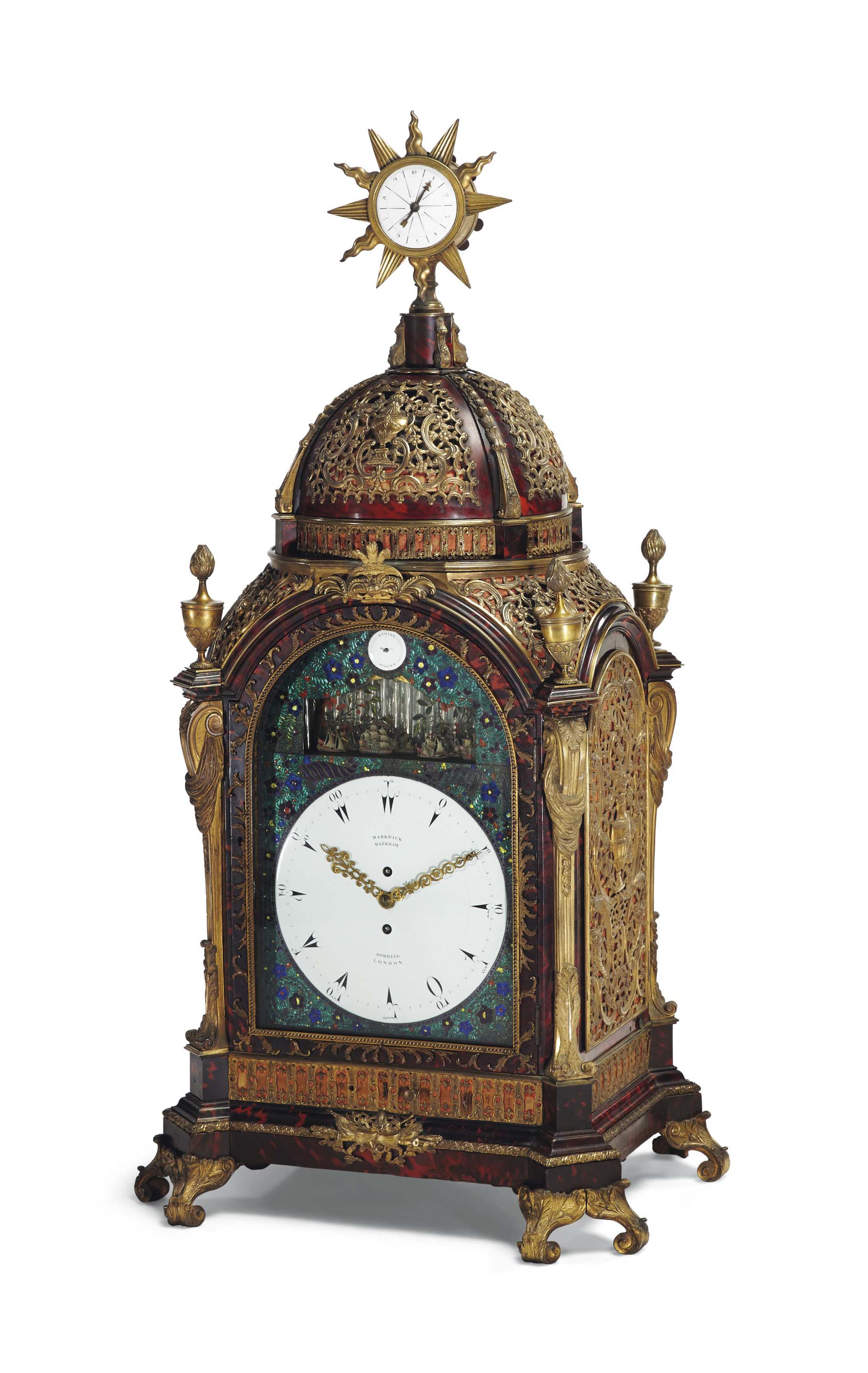
Markwick Markham Pipe Organ Clock

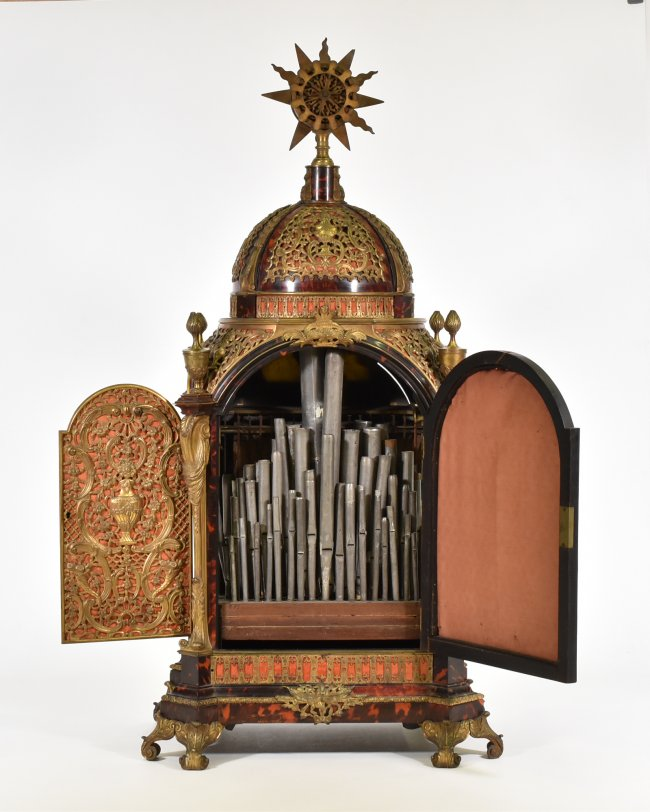
Inside of a Markwick Markham Pipe Organ Clock

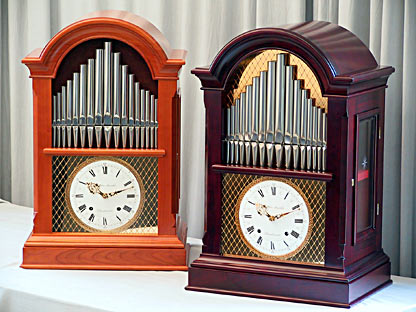
Musical "flute clock" with organ manufactured by Matthias Naeschke

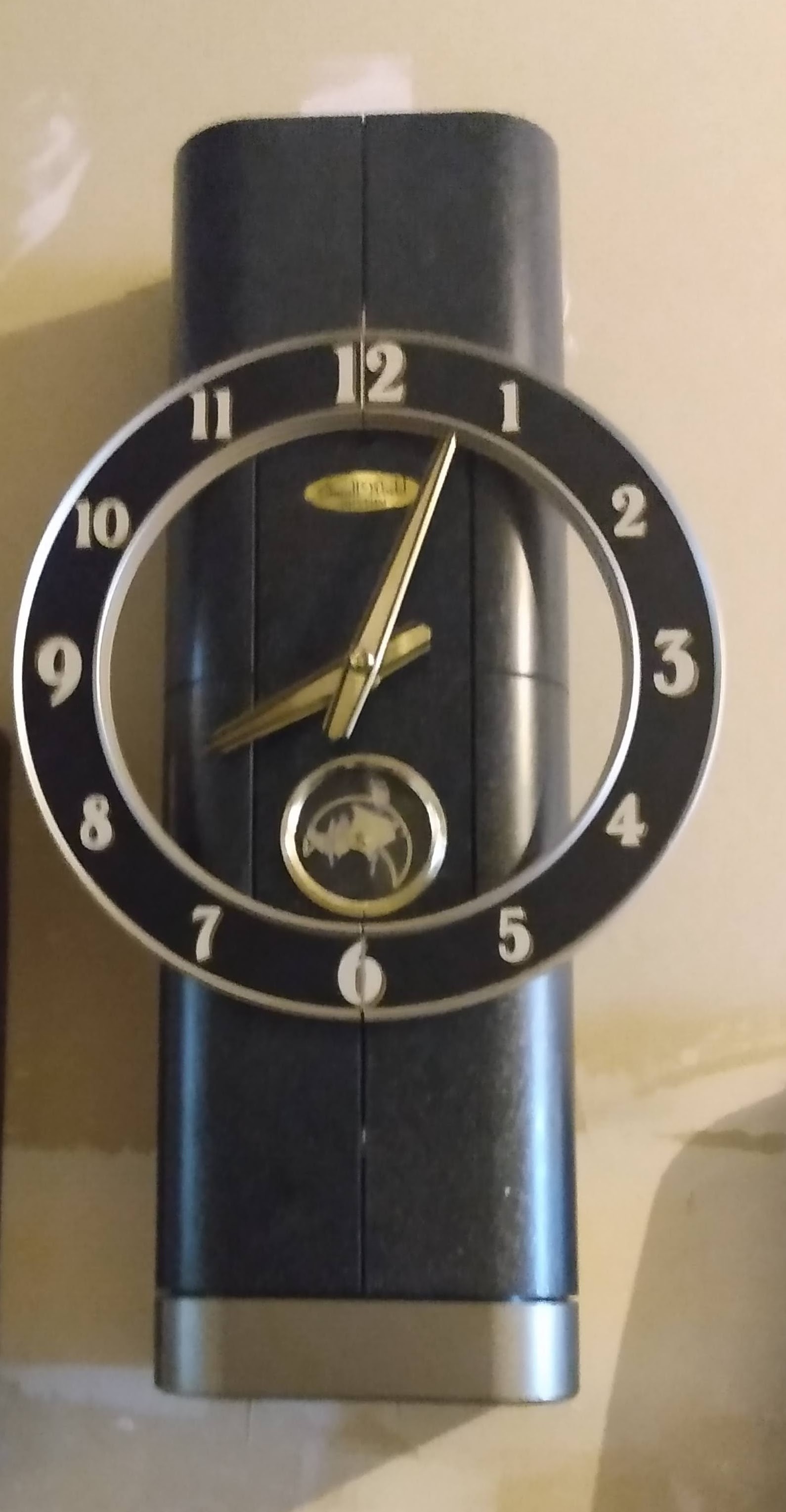
Musical clock likely from the 1990s manufactured by Rhythm Watch

A musical clock is a clock that marks the hours of the day with a musical tune. They can be considered elaborate versions of striking or chiming clocks.

Elaborate large-scale musical clocks with automatons are often installed in public places and are widespread in Japan. Unlike conventional electronic musical clocks, these clocks plays pre-recorded music samples, instead of using programmed sound synthesis. One of the earliest known domestic musical clocks was constructed by Nicholas Vallin in 1598, and it currently resides in the British Museum in London.

== Description ==
The music on mechanical clocks is typically played from a spiked cylinder on bells, organ pipes, or bellows. On electric clocks such as quartz clocks, the music is usually generated using an electronic sound module. Most of these quartz musical clocks utilize either FM synthesis or sample-based synthesis technology for sound generation to produce high-fidelity and complex music, similar to the sound generation methods of electronic musical instruments.

== Pipe organ clock ==
The pipe organ clock was a specific clock that chimed with a small pipe organ built into the unit. An example is a Markwick Markham made for the Turkish market, c. 1770.

== Popularity in Japan ==
In Japan, aside from the extensive popularity of large-scale musical clocks installed in public facilities, electronic musical wall clocks has become a popular novelty items since the late 1990s. They are mostly collected for their aesthetic and decorative values, especially those with elaborate movements and advanced music generation. Most of these clocks are manufactured by Seiko and Rhythm.

== See also ==
- Automaton clock
- Music by CPE Bach for musical clock
