= Clock tower =

Architectural structure housing a clock

The Elizabeth Tower in London is a major landmark.

Clock towers are a specific type of structure that house a turret clock and have one or more clock faces on the upper exterior walls. Many clock towers are freestanding structures but they can also adjoin or be located on top of another building. Some other buildings also have clock faces on their exterior but these structures serve other main functions.

Clock towers are a common sight in many parts of the world with some being iconic buildings. One example is the Elizabeth Tower in London (usually called "Big Ben", although strictly this name belongs only to the bell inside the tower).

== Definition ==
There are many structures that may have clocks or clock faces attached to them and some structures have had clocks added to an existing structure. According to the Council on Tall Buildings and Urban Habitat, a structure is defined as a building if at least fifty percent of its height is made up of floor plates containing habitable floor area. Structures that do not meet this criterion are defined as towers. A clock tower historically fits this definition of a tower and therefore can be defined as any tower specifically built with one or more (often four) clock faces and that can be either freestanding or part of a church or municipal building such as a town hall. Not all clocks on buildings therefore make the building into a clock tower.

The mechanism inside the tower is known as a turret clock. It often marks the hour (and sometimes segments of an hour) by sounding large bells or chimes, sometimes playing simple musical phrases or tunes. Some clock towers were previously built as Bell towers and then had clocks added to them. As these structures fulfil the definition of a tower they can be considered to be clock towers.

== History ==
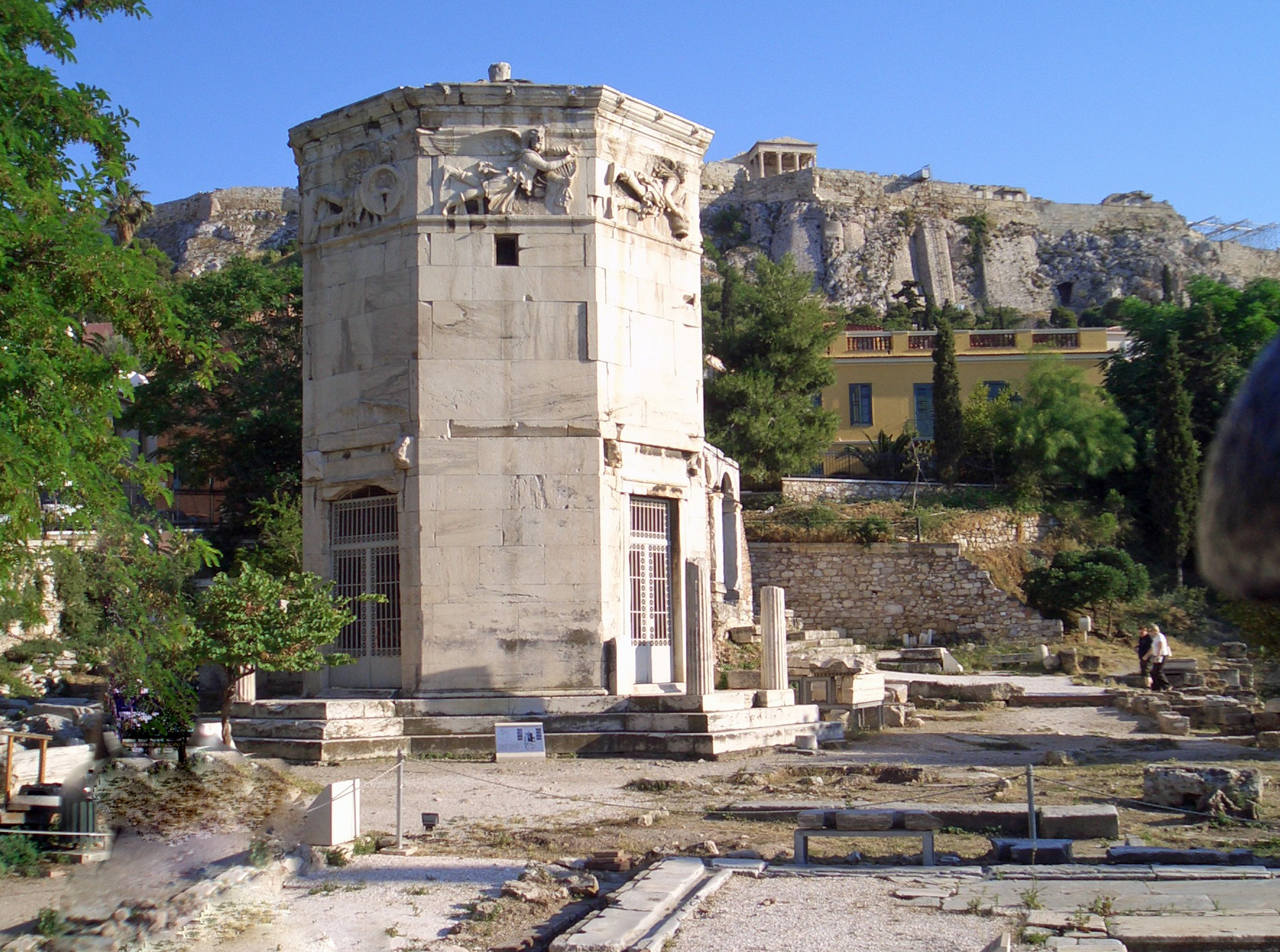
The Tower of the Winds in Athens, built c. 50 BC during Roman Greece

Although clock towers are today mostly admired for their aesthetics, they once served an important purpose. Before the middle of the twentieth century, most people did not have watches, and prior to the 18th century even home clocks were rare. The first clocks did not have faces, but were solely striking clocks, which sounded bells to call the surrounding community to work or to prayer. They were therefore placed in towers so the bells would be audible for a long distance. Clock towers were placed near the centres of towns and were often the tallest structures there. As clock towers became more common, the designers realized that a dial on the outside of the tower would allow the townspeople to read the time whenever they wanted.

The use of clock towers dates back to antiquity. The earliest clock tower was the Tower of the Winds in Athens, which featured eight sundials and was created in the 1st century BC during the period of Roman Greece. In its interior, there was also a water clock (or clepsydra), driven by water coming down from the Acropolis.

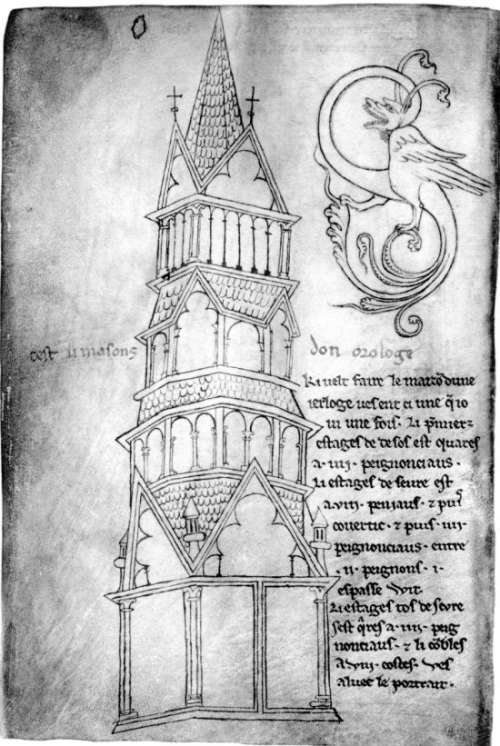
Presumably the first depiction of a medieval central European clock tower (without the actual turret clock) in the 13th century by Villard de Honnecourt

In Song dynasty China, an astronomical clock tower was designed by Su Song and erected at Kaifeng in 1088, featuring a liquid escapement mechanism. In England, a clock was put up in a clock tower, the medieval precursor to Big Ben, at Westminster, in 1288; and in 1292 a clock was put up in Canterbury Cathedral. The oldest surviving turret clock formerly part of a clock tower in Europe is the Salisbury Cathedral clock, completed around 1390. A clock put up at St. Albans, in 1326, 'showed various astronomical phenomena'.

Al-Jazari of the Artuqid dynasty in Upper Mesopotamia constructed an elaborate clock called the "castle clock" and described it in his Book of Knowledge of Ingenious Mechanical Devices in 1206. It was about 3.3 metres (11 feet) high, and had multiple functions alongside timekeeping. It included a display of the zodiac and the solar and lunar paths, and a pointer in the shape of the crescent moon that travelled across the top of a gateway, moved by a hidden cart and causing automatic doors to open, each revealing a mannequin, every hour. It was possible to re-program the length of day and night daily in order to account for the changing lengths of day and night throughout the year, and it also featured five robotic musicians who automatically play music when moved by levers operated by a hidden camshaft attached to a water wheel.

Line (mains) synchronous tower clocks were introduced in the United States in the 1920s.

== Landmarks ==
Some clock towers have become famous landmarks. Prominent examples include Elizabeth Tower built in 1859, which houses the Great Bell (generally known as Big Ben) in London, the tower of Philadelphia City Hall, the Rajabai Tower in Mumbai, the Spasskaya Tower of the Moscow Kremlin, the Torre dell'Orologio in the Piazza San Marco in Venice, Italy, the Peace Tower of the Parliament of Canada in Ottawa, the Zytglogge clock tower in the Old City of Bern, Switzerland, and The Clock Towers overlooking the Sacred Mosque in Mecca, Saudi Arabia.

== Records ==
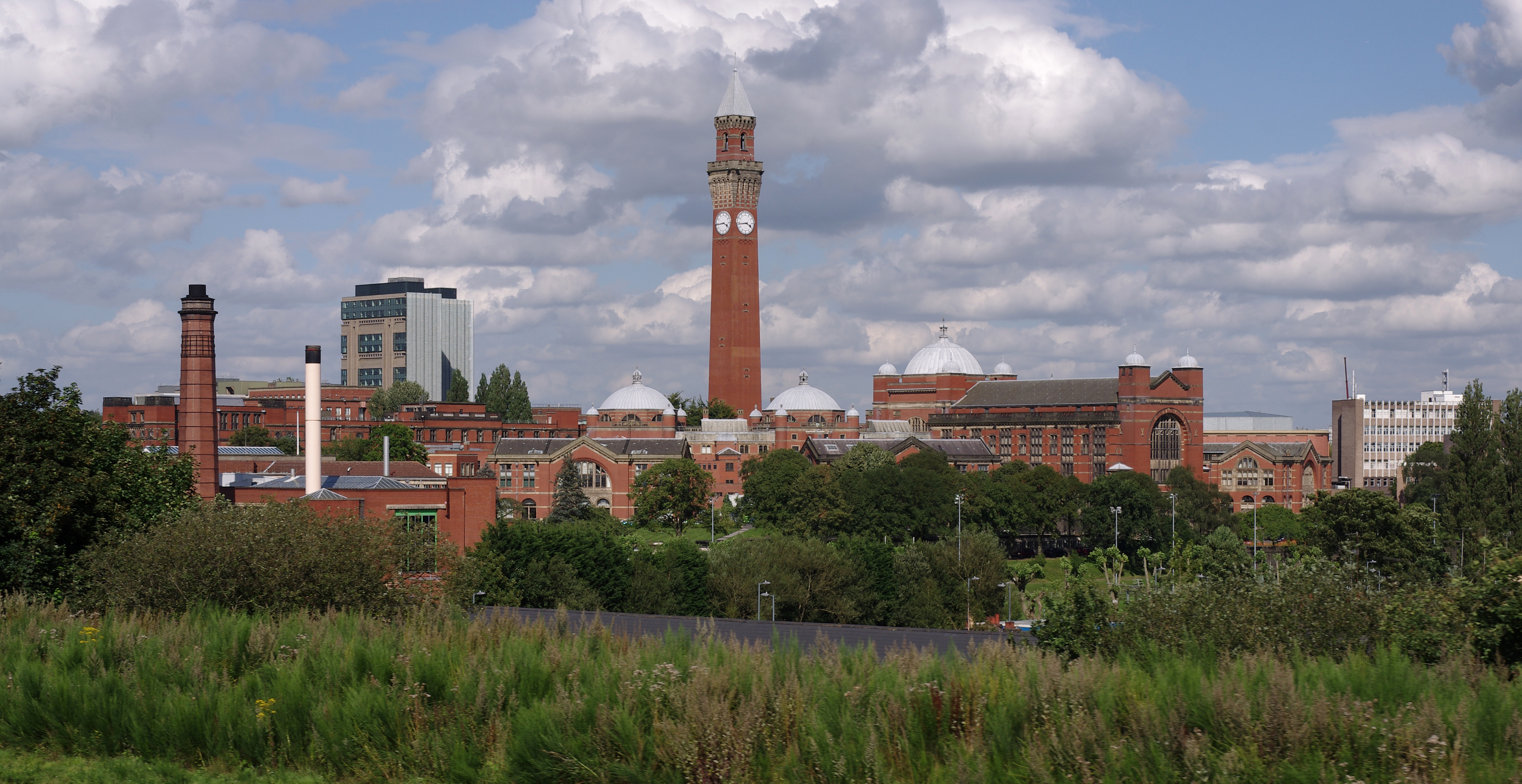
Old Joe in Birmingham, England – the tallest freestanding clock tower in the world

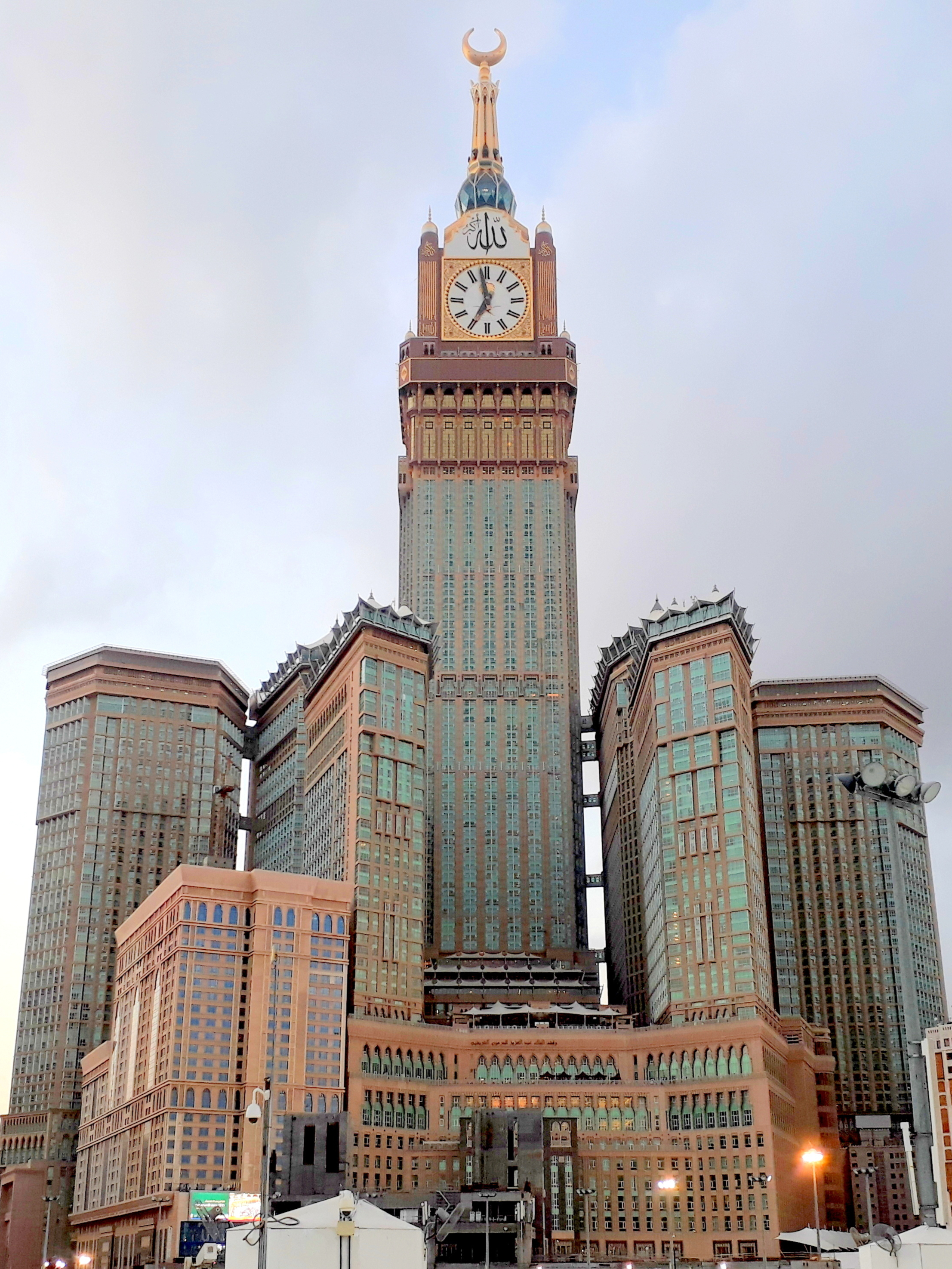
The Mecca Clock Tower

The tallest freestanding clock tower in the world is the Joseph Chamberlain Memorial Clock Tower (Old Joe) at the University of Birmingham in Birmingham, United Kingdom. The tower stands at 100 metres (330 feet) tall and was completed in 1908. The clock tower of Philadelphia City Hall was part of the tallest building in the world from 1894, when the tower was topped out and the building partially occupied, until 1908.

Taller buildings have had clock faces added to their existing structure such as the Palace of Culture and Science in Warsaw, with a clock added in 2000. The building has a roof height of 187.68 m (615.7 ft), and an antenna height of 237 m (778 ft). The NTT Docomo Yoyogi Building in Tokyo, with a clock added in 2002, has a roof height of 240 m (790 ft), and an antenna height of 272 m (892 ft).

The Clock Towers, a hotel complex in Mecca completed in 2012, feature the Mecca Royal Clock Tower, which has the largest and highest clock faces on a building in the world. The tower has an occupied height of 494.4 m (1,622 ft) and a tip height of 601 m (1,972 ft). It has four clock faces, two of which are 43 m (141 ft) in diameter, positioned at a height of approximately 400 m (1,300 ft). The complex also houses the world's highest Museum.

== See also ==
- List of clock towers
- Bell tower
- Minaret
- Street clock
- Thirteenth stroke of the clock
