= Benfeld station =

French railway station

Benfeld
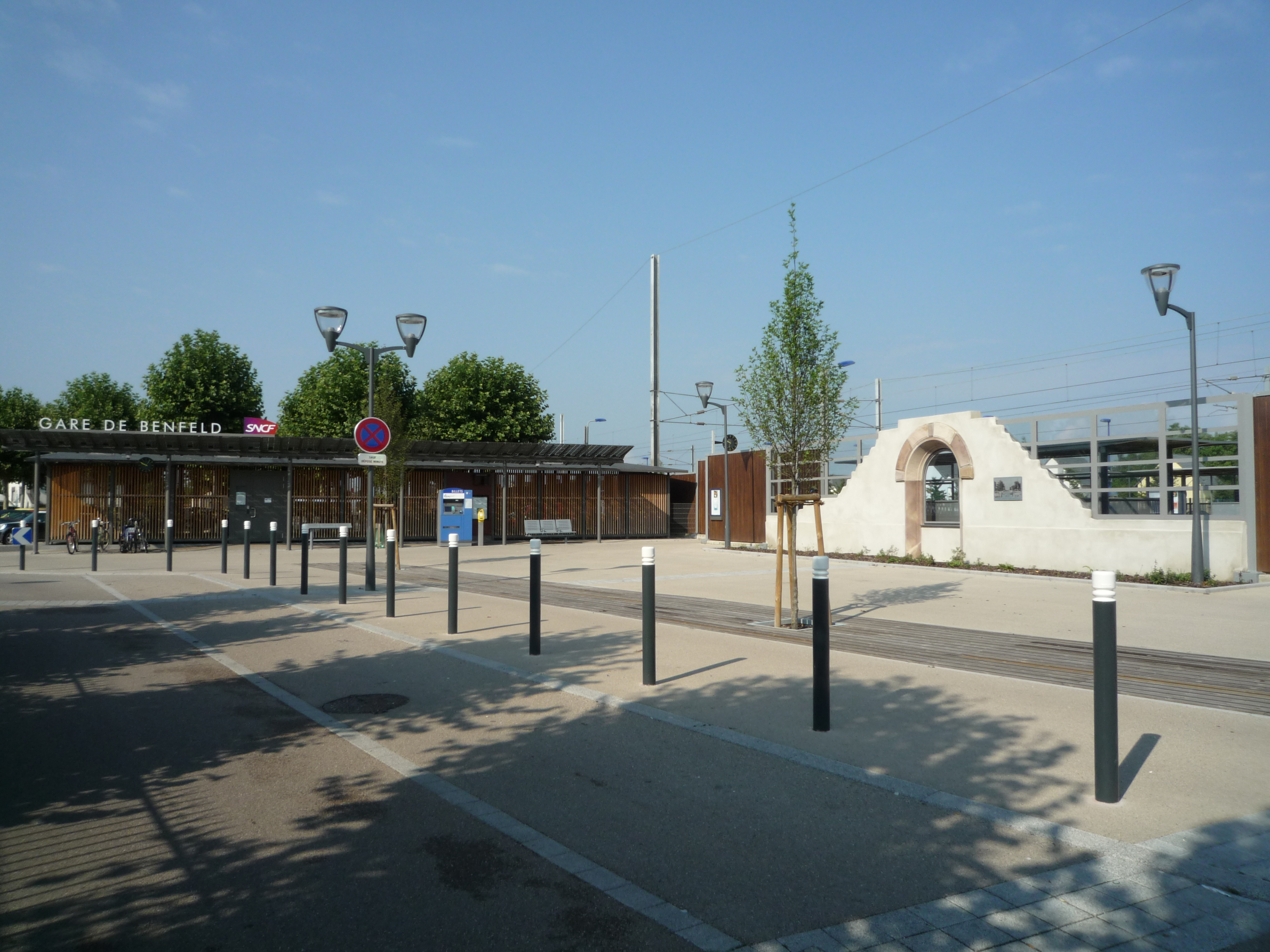

General information
- Location: Avenue de la Gare; 67230 Benfeld; France
- Coordinates: 48°22′25″N 7°35′03″E
- Owner: SNCF
- Operator: SNCF
- Line: Strasbourg–Basel railway
- Platforms: 2 side platforms
- Tracks: 2

Other information
- Station code: 87214122

History
- Opened: October 19, 1840

Passengers
- 2015: 548 380

Services
Preceding station	TER Grand Est	Following station
Matzenheim towards Strasbourg	A02a	Kogenheim towards Colmar
Location

Benfeld station (French: Gare de Benfeld) is a French railway station in Benfeld, Bas-Rhin, France.

== Railway location ==
The station is situated at the kilometric point (KP) 26.687 of the Strasbourg-Basel railway and 160 m above sea level.

== Passengers ==
=== Facilities ===
There is no ticket office at the station, but there is a transport ticket machine.

=== Services ===
The station is served by the TER Grand Est (between Strasbourg and Colmar).

Eurocity Jean Monnet running between Mulhouse-Ville and Luxembourg also services the station once a day.

== See also ==
- List of SNCF stations in Grand Est
