= Benfeld =

Benfeld Banfald
- Commune
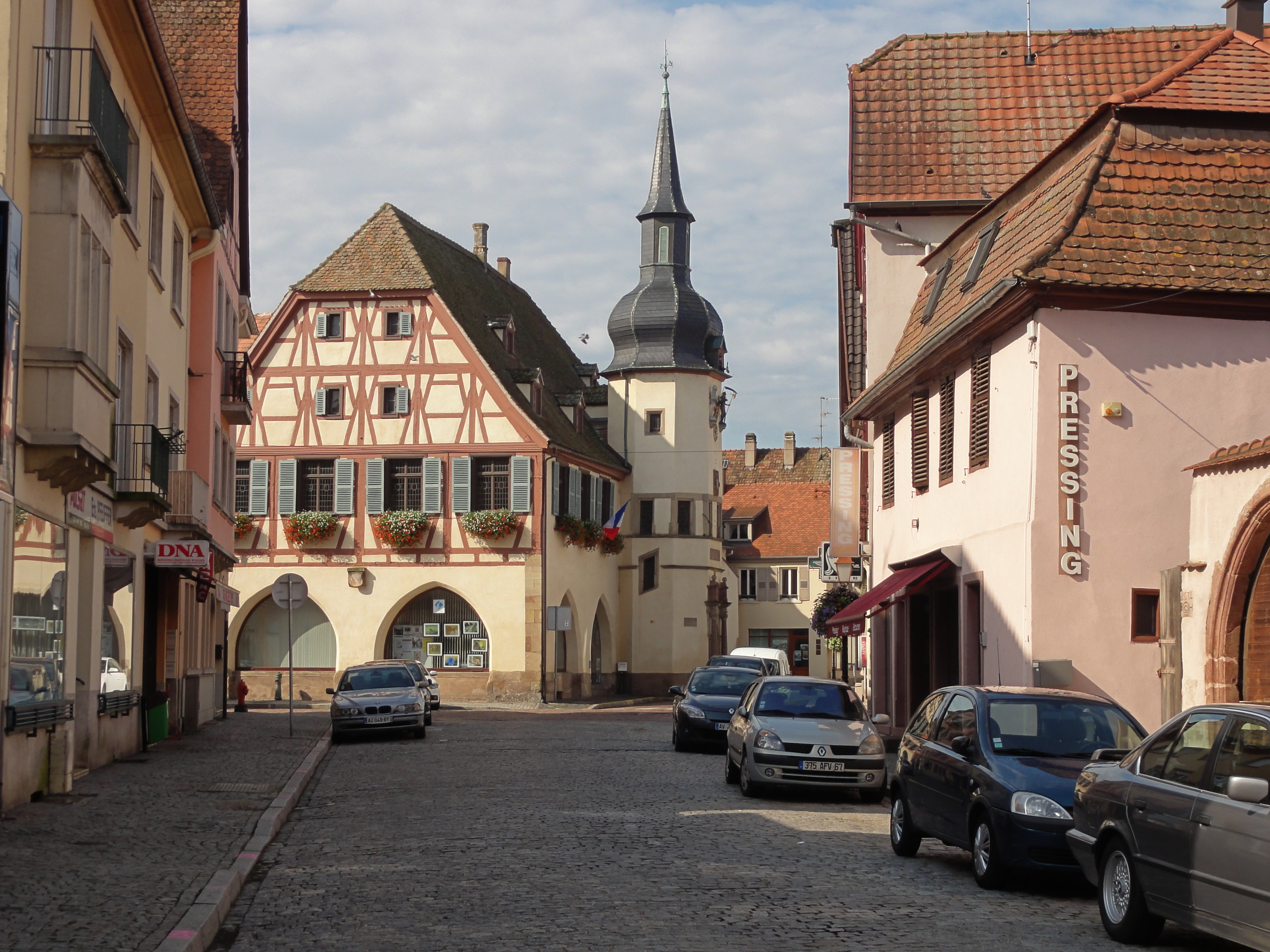
- The Hôtel de Ville

- Coat of arms
- Location of Benfeld
- Location within France Location within Grand Est
- Coordinates: 48°22′16″N 7°35′42″E
- Country: France
- Region: Grand Est
- Department: Bas-Rhin
- Arrondissement: Sélestat-Erstein
- Canton: Erstein

Government
  - Mayor (2020–2026): Jacky Wolfarth
- Area^{1}: 7.79 km^{2} (3.01 sq mi)
- Elevation: 160 m (520 ft)
- Highest elevation: 162 m (531 ft)
- Lowest elevation: 155 m (509 ft)
- Population (2023): 5,973
  - Density: 767/km^{2} (1,990/sq mi)
- Time zone: UTC+01:00 (CET)
  - Summer (DST): UTC+02:00 (CEST)
- INSEE/Postal code: 67028 /67230
- Dialling codes: 0388
- ^{1} French Land Register data, which excludes lakes, ponds, glaciers > 1 km^{2} (0.386 sq mi or 247 acres) and river estuaries.

Benfeld (French pronunciation: [bɛnfɛld]; Alsatian: Banfald [ˈbanfalt]) is a commune in the Bas-Rhin department in Grand Est in northeastern France. It is situated on the river Ill. In the nearby hamlet Ehl there is an archaeological site with the remains of the Gallo-Roman city Ellelum or Helvetum. Benfeld station has rail connections to Strasbourg and Colmar.

The missionary to remote northern Australia, Francis Xavier Gsell, was born in Benfeld in 1872.

== Population ==
Historical population

| Year | Pop. | ±% p.a. |
|---|---|---|
| 1793 | 1,309 | — |
| 1800 | 1,220 | −1.00% |
| 1806 | 1,188 | −0.44% |
| 1821 | 1,794 | +2.79% |
| 1831 | 2,230 | +2.20% |
| 1836 | 2,555 | +2.76% |
| 1841 | 2,688 | +1.02% |
| 1846 | 2,807 | +0.87% |
| 1851 | 3,001 | +1.35% |
| 1856 | 2,926 | −0.50% |
| 1861 | 2,745 | −1.27% |
| 1866 | 2,757 | +0.09% |
| 1871 | 2,603 | −1.14% |
| 1875 | 2,635 | +0.31% |
| 1880 | 2,797 | +1.20% |
| 1885 | 2,544 | −1.88% |
| 1890 | 2,324 | −1.79% |
| 1895 | 2,479 | +1.30% |
| 1900 | 2,388 | −0.75% |

| Year | Pop. | ±% p.a. |
|---|---|---|
| 1905 | 2,466 | +0.64% |
| 1910 | 2,640 | +1.37% |
| 1921 | 2,518 | −0.43% |
| 1926 | 2,655 | +1.07% |
| 1931 | 2,741 | +0.64% |
| 1936 | 2,838 | +0.70% |
| 1946 | 2,588 | −0.92% |
| 1954 | 2,886 | +1.37% |
| 1962 | 3,449 | +2.25% |
| 1968 | 3,441 | −0.04% |
| 1975 | 3,798 | +1.42% |
| 1982 | 4,451 | +2.29% |
| 1990 | 4,330 | −0.34% |
| 1999 | 4,878 | +1.33% |
| 2007 | 5,315 | +1.08% |
| 2012 | 5,667 | +1.29% |
| 2017 | 5,753 | +0.30% |
| 2023 | 5,973 | +0.63% |

Source: EHESS and INSEE (1968-2023)

== Sights ==
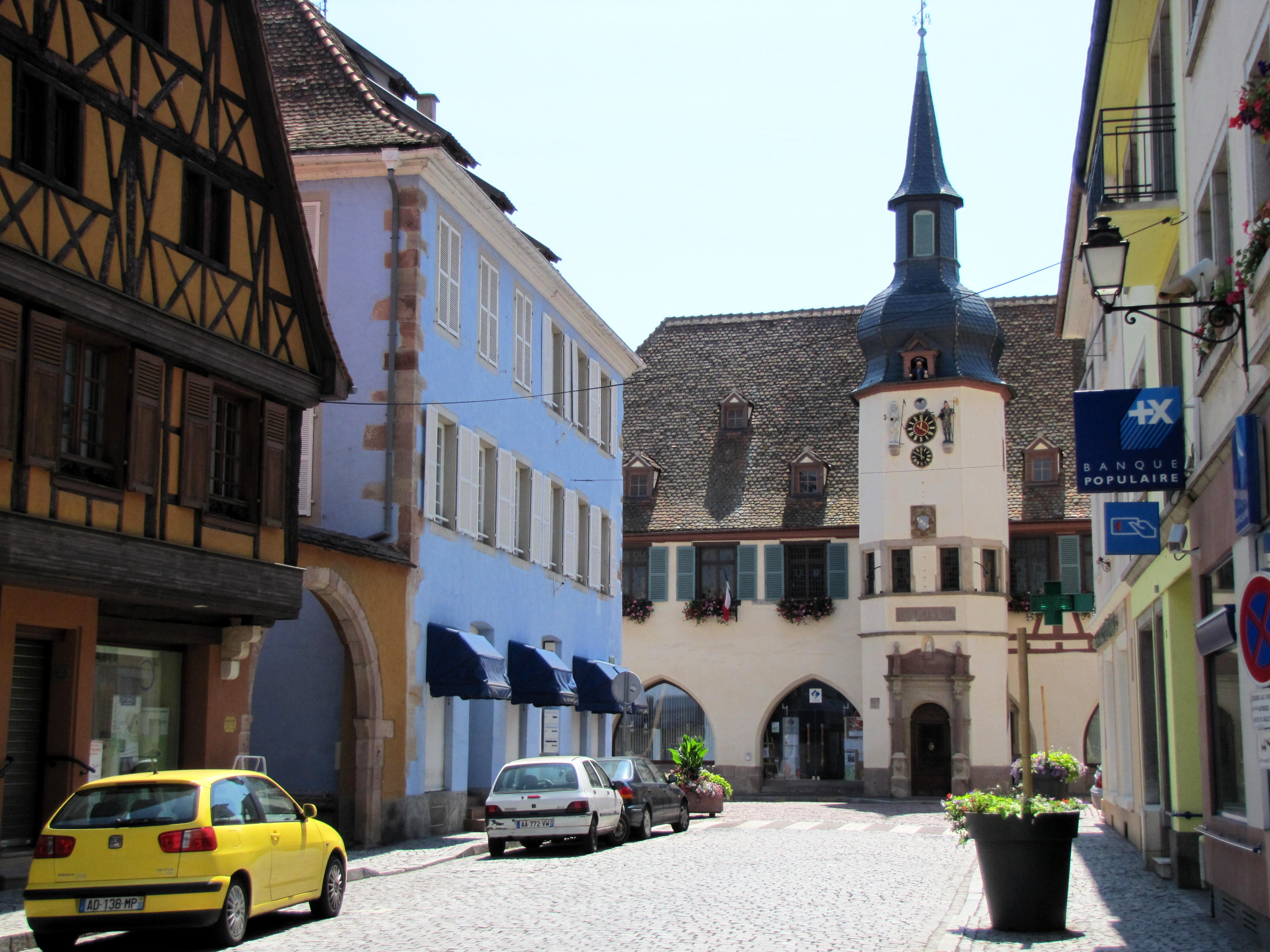
Old town and Hôtel de Ville

The core of the town boasts several ancient buildings, chief among them the Renaissance Hôtel de Ville (town hall) with its 1619 automata. The handsome 1846 synagogue survived the Nazi occupation.

== See also ==
- Communes of the Bas-Rhin department
