= Striking clock =

Clock that sounds the time with a bell or gong

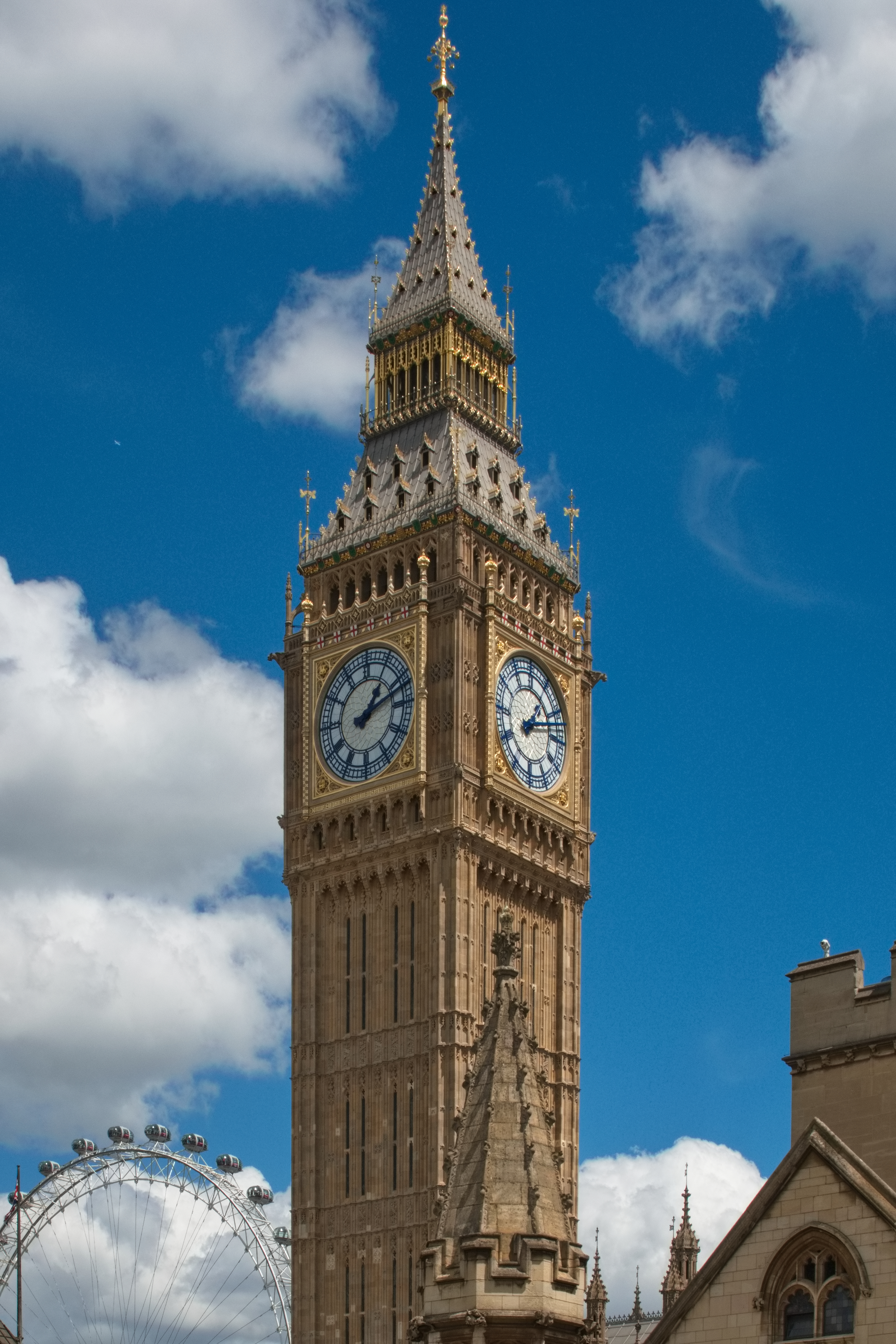
The Elizabeth Tower of the Palace of Westminster in London, commonly referred to as Big Ben, is a famous striking clock.

A striking clock is a clock that sounds the hours on a bell, gong, or other audible device. In 12-hour striking, used most commonly in striking clocks today, the clock strikes once at 1:00 am, twice at 2:00 am, continuing in this way up to twelve times at 12:00 mid-day, then starts again, striking once at 1:00 pm, twice at 2:00 pm, and the pattern continues up to twelve times at 12:00 midnight.

The striking feature of clocks was originally more important than their clock faces; the earliest clocks struck the hours, but had no dials to enable the time to be read. The development of mechanical clocks in 12th century Europe was motivated by the need to ring bells upon the canonical hours to call the community to prayer. The earliest known mechanical clocks were large striking clocks installed in towers in monasteries or public squares, so that their bells could be heard far away. Though an early striking clock in Syria was a 12-hour clock, many early clocks struck up to 24 strokes, particularly in Italy, where the 24-hour clock, keeping Italian hours, was widely used in the 14th and 15th centuries. As the modern 12-hour clock became more widespread, particularly in Great Britain and Northern Europe, 12-hour striking eventually became the standard. In addition to striking on the hour, many striking clocks play sequences of chimes on the quarter-hours. The most common sequence is Westminster Quarters.

Today the time-disseminating function of clock striking is almost no longer needed, and striking clocks are kept for historical, traditional, and aesthetic reasons. Historic clock towers in towns, universities, and religious institutions worldwide still strike the hours, famous examples being Big Ben in London, the Peace Tower in Ottawa, and the Kremlin Clock in Moscow. Home striking clocks, such as mantel clocks, cuckoo clocks, grandfather clocks and bracket clocks are also very common.

A typical striking clock will have two gear trains, because a striking clock must add a striking train which operates the bell-ringing mechanism to the timekeeping train that measures the passage of time.

== Passing strike ==
The Kremlin Clock on the Moscow Kremlin rings in 2012.

The most basic sort of striking clock simply sounds a bell once every hour; this is called a passing strike clock. Passing strike was simple to implement mechanically. All that must be done is to attach a cam to a shaft which rotates once per hour; the cam raises and then lets a hammer fall that strikes the bell. The first tower clocks, mounted in towers in cathedrals, abbeys, and monasteries to call the community to prayer, which originated in Medieval Europe before the invention of the mechanical clock in the 13th century, were water clocks that used the passing strike mechanism; they rang once for each canonical hour. In Ancient Egypt and later Ancient Rome, sundials were typically used during the day and water clocks were preferred for keeping the time at night. The Tower of the Winds in Athens, the only surviving tower clock of classical antiquity, built in the 1st century BC during Roman Greece, has visible sundials on its exterior and evidence that a water clock and weather vane were also used.

The ancient Han Chinese developed water-driven astronomical clocks with automatically rotating armillary spheres starting with the Han dynasty era scientist Zhang Heng (78–139). The Tang dynasty Chinese Buddhist monk and inventor Yi Xing (683–727) created a rotating celestial globe that was turned by a water clock mechanism driven by a waterwheel. This featured two wooden gear jacks on its horizon surface with a drum and a bell, the bell being struck automatically every hour and the drum being struck automatically every quarter-hour. It is recorded that Confucian students in the year 730 were required to write an essay on this device in order to pass the Imperial examinations. The use of clock jacks to sound the hours were used in later clock towers of Song dynasty China, such as those designed by Zhang Sixun and Su Song in the 10th and 11th centuries, respectively.

A striking clock outside of China was the clock tower near the Umayyad Mosque in Damascus, Syria, which struck once every hour. It is the subject of a book, On the Construction of Clocks and their Use (1203), by Riḍwān ibn al-Sāʿātī, the son of a clockmaker. The Florentine writer Dante Alighieri made a reference to the gear works of striking clocks in 1319. One of the older clock towers still standing is St Mark's Clocktower in St Mark's Square, Venice. The St Mark's Clock was commissioned in 1493, from the famous clockmaker Gian Carlo Rainieri from Reggio Emilia, where his father Gian Paolo Rainieri had already constructed another famous device in 1481. In 1497, Simone Campanato moulded the great bell, which was put on the top of the tower where it is alternately beaten by the Due Mori (Two Moors), two bronze statues handling a hammer.

== Counting the hours ==
During the great wave of tower clock building in 14th-century Europe, around the time of the invention of the mechanical clock itself, striking clocks were built that struck the bell multiple times, to count out the hours. The clock of the Beata Vergine (later San Gottardo) in Milan, built around 1330, was one of the earliest recorded that struck the hours. In 1335, Galvano Fiamma wrote:

There is there a wonderful clock, because there is a very large clapper which strikes a bell 24 times according to the 24 hours of the day and night, and thus at the first hour of the night gives one sound, at the second two strokes, and so distinguishes one hour from another, which is of greatest use to men of every degree.

The astronomical clock designed by Richard of Wallingford in 1327 and built around 1354, also struck 24 hours.

Some rare clocks use a form of striking known as "Roman Striking" invented by Joseph Knibb, in which a large bell or lower tone is sounded to represent "five", and a small bell or high tone is sounded to represent "one". For example, four o'clock would be sounded as a high tone followed by a low tone, whereas the hour of eleven o'clock would be sounded by two low tones followed by a high tone. The purpose is to conserve the power of the striking train. For example, "VII" would be a total of three strikes instead of seven, and "XII" would be four strikes instead of twelve. Clocks using this type of striking usually represent four o'clock on the dial with an "IV" rather than the more common "IIII", so that the Roman numerals correspond with the sequence of strikes on the high and low bells. One small table clock of this type sold from the George Daniels collection at Sotheby's on 6 November 2012 for £1,273,250.

=== Countwheel ===
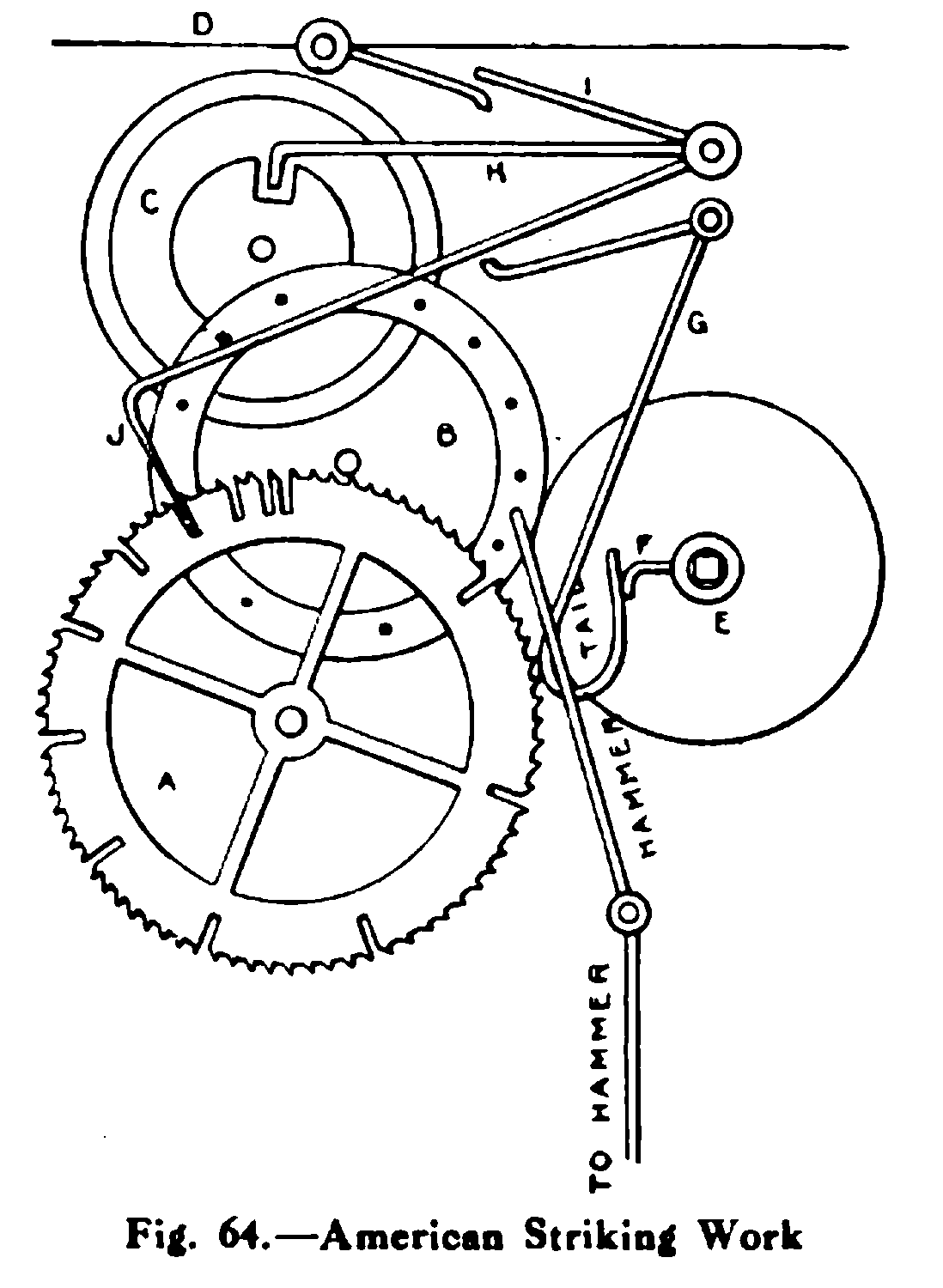
Countwheel striking: the unequally spaced notches in the countwheel (A) regulate the number of times the bell is struck.

Two mechanisms have been devised by clockmakers to enable striking clocks to correctly count out the hours. The earlier, which appeared in the first striking clocks in the 14th century, is called "countwheel striking". This uses a wheel that contains notches on its side, spaced by unequal, increasing arc segments. This countwheel governs the rotation of the striking train. When the striking train is released by the timekeeping train, a lever is lifted from a notch on the countwheel; the uneven notches allow the striking train to move only far enough to sound the correct number of times, after which the lever falls back into the next notch and stops the striking train from turning further.

The countwheel has the disadvantage of being entirely independent of the timekeeping train; if the striking train winds down, or for some other reason the clock fails to strike, the countwheel will become out of sync with the time shown by the hands, and must be resynchronized by manually releasing the striking train until it moves around to the correct position.

=== Rack striking ===
In the late seventeenth century, rack striking was invented. Rack striking is so called because it is regulated by a rack and snail mechanism. The distance a rack can fall is determined by a snail-shaped cam, thereby regulating the number of times the bell is allowed to sound. There was a misconception during the 20th century that the rack and snail mechanism was invented by British clergyman Edward Barlow in 1675–6. In fact, the inventor is unknown.

The snail-shaped cam is a part of the timekeeping train that revolves every twelve hours. The snail is often attached to the same pipe on which the hour hand is mounted. The diameter of the cam is largest at the one o'clock position, permitting the rack to move only a short distance, after which the striking train is stopped; it is smallest at the 12 o'clock position, which allows the rack to move the furthest. Striking stops when the last tooth of the rack has been taken up by the gathering pallet.

Since the number of strikes on the hour is determined by the position of the snail which rotates in tandem with the hour hand, rack striking rarely becomes desynchronized. Rack striking also led to the repeating clock, which can be made to repeat the last hour struck by pressing a button. Rack striking became the standard mechanism used in striking clocks down to the present.

== Parts of mechanism ==
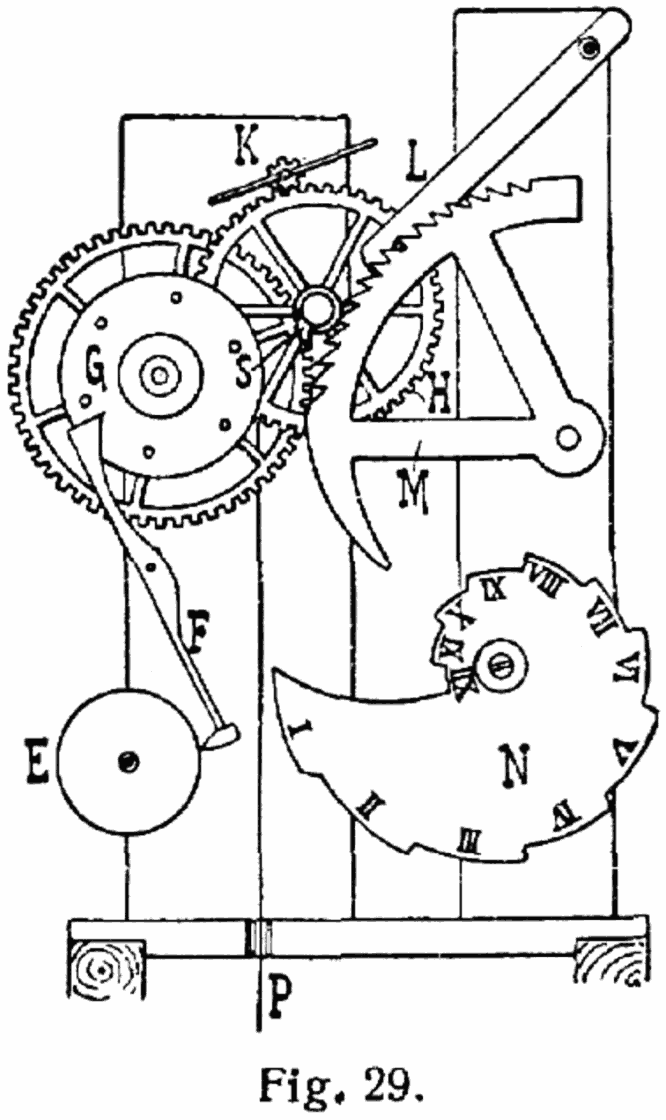
Rack striking: the snail-shaped cam (N) makes the clock sound the correct number of times by checking the fall of the rack (M).

All hour striking mechanisms have these parts. The letters below refer to the diagram.

- Power source – This is usually identical to the device that powers the clock's timekeeping mechanism: in weight driven clocks it is a second weight on a cord (P), in spring driven clocks it is another mainspring. Although older one-day (30-hour) clocks typically used a single weight or mainspring to drive both the timekeeping and striking trains, better clocks used a separate power source, because the striking mechanism consumes a lot of power and often has to be wound more frequently, and also to isolate the delicate timekeeping train from the large movements that occur in the striking train. Winding a striking clock requires winding both the timing and striking parts separately.
- Striking train – This is a gear train (G,H) that scales down the force of the power source and transmits it to the hammer mechanism which rings the gong. In antique clocks, to reduce the manufacturing cost, it was often exactly the same as the timing train that ran the clock's timekeeping part, and installed parallel to it, on the left side as one faces the clock.
- Regulator – A device to prevent the striking train from running too fast, and control the speed of striking. If it was not present, the striking train when released would run out of control under the force of the spring or weight. In most clocks, it is a simple fly fan (or fan fly) (K), a flat piece of sheet metal mounted on the fastest turning gear shaft. When the striking train turns, this beats the air, and the air friction limits the speed of the train. Striking watches and some modern clocks use a centrifugal governor instead.
- Count mechanism – This is the critical part mentioned above, that releases the striking train at the proper time and counts out the correct number of strikes. It is the only part of the striking mechanism that is attached to the clock's timekeeping works. Virtually all modern clocks use the rack and snail. The snail (N) is usually mounted on the clock's center wheel shaft, which turns once every 12 hours. There is also a release lever (L) which on the hour releases the rack and allows the timing train to turn.
- Hammer and gong – The hammer lever (F) is actuated by pins or teeth (G) on one of the striking train wheels. As the wheel turns, the pin lifts the hammer lever, until the lever slips off the pin, allowing the hammer to drop, hitting the gong (E). Early house clocks used traditional hemispherical shaped bells. House clocks later used gongs made of long steel tubes or bars, which have a sound more like large church bells. Mantel and other small clocks use thick hardened steel wires, which are coiled into a spiral to save space.

Clocks that have more elaborate functions than just striking the hours, such as chiming the quarter hours, or playing tunes, are called "chiming clocks" by clockmakers. The additional functions are usually run by a second complete striking mechanism separate from the (hour) striking train, called the "chiming train". These clocks have three weights or mainsprings, to power the timing train, striking train, and chiming train.

== How it works ==
This describes how the rack and snail striking mechanism works. The labels refer to the drawing above.

The release lever (L) holds the rack (M) up when the clock is not striking. On the shaft of the minute hand (not shown), which rotates once per hour, there is a projection. As the change of the hour approaches, this projection slowly lifts the release lever, allowing the rack to fall until its point rests on the snail (N). The amount the rack can fall, and thus the number of strikes, is determined by the position of the snail. Exactly on the hour the striking train (G, H, K) is released and begins to turn. As it turns, the pins (G) repeatedly lift the hammer (F) and allow it to drop, ringing the gong (E). The gear ratios are arranged so that the gear wheel (H) makes one revolution each strike. A small pin (S) on this wheel engages the rack teeth, lifting the rack up by one tooth each turn. When the rack reaches the end of its teeth, it stops the striking train from turning (using a mechanism not shown in the diagram, in such a way that gear (H) is held stationary with the pin (S) not engaging the rack, so the rack is able to fall freely again on the next hour). The number of strikes is equal to the number of teeth of the rack which are used, which depends on the position of the snail.

== Types of striking clocks ==
A Cuckoo clock striking the 8th hour with mechanical automaton and the sound of a Cuckoo's call to mark the hours.

Specialized types of striking clocks:

- Chiming clock – Strikes on the hours and chimes on the quarter hours, often playing fragments of a tune such as Westminster Quarters.
- Repeater – a striking clock that can repeat the strikes at the push of a lever, for telling time in the dark.
- Musical clock – plays tunes on a music box in addition to counting the time.
- Automaton clock – with mechanically animated figures that perform various displays, usually as a part of the clock striking the hours.
  - Cuckoo clock – a specific type of automaton clock that originated in Germany, which displays an animated bird and plays imitation birdcalls.
- Ship's bell clock – strikes the ship's bells instead of the hours.

Some quartz clocks also contain speakers and sound chips that electronically imitate the sounds of a chiming or striking clock. Other quartz striking clocks use electrical power to strike bells or gongs.

== See also ==
- Alarm clock
- Repeater watches (horology)
- St. Michael's chimes
- Twelve Grapes
- Thirteenth stroke of the clock
- Westminster Chimes
- Whittington chimes
- Water clock

== Sources and further reading ==
- Bruton, Eric (2002). The History of Clocks and Watches. New York: Time Warner. ISBN 0-316-72426-2.
- Landes, David (1983). Revolution in time: Clocks and the making of the modern world. Cambridge, MA: Harvard University Press. ISBN 0-674-76802-7.
- Lawrence, Arnold Walter (1957). Greek Architecture. The Pelican History of Art. Harmondsworth, Middlesex: Penguin Books. LCCN 57059193.
- Milham, Willis I. (1945). Time and Timekeepers. New York: Macmillan. ISBN 0-7808-0008-7.
- Needham, Joseph (1986). Science and Civilization in China: Volume 4, Physics and Physical Technology, Part 2, Mechanical Engineering. Taipei: Caves Books Ltd.
- Noble, Joseph V.; de Solla Price, Derek J. (1968). "The Water Clock in the Tower of the Winds". American Journal of Archaeology. 72 (4): 345–355. doi:10.2307/503828. ISSN 0002-9114. JSTOR 503828. S2CID 193112893.
- Symonds, R.W. (1947). Pevsner, Nikolaus (ed.). A Book of English Clocks. The King Penguin Books. Harmondsworth & New York: Penguin Books.
- Antique clockwork marvels from China's Forbidden City (YouTube video)
