= Rhythm Watch =

Japanese global corporate group

Rhythm Co., Ltd.
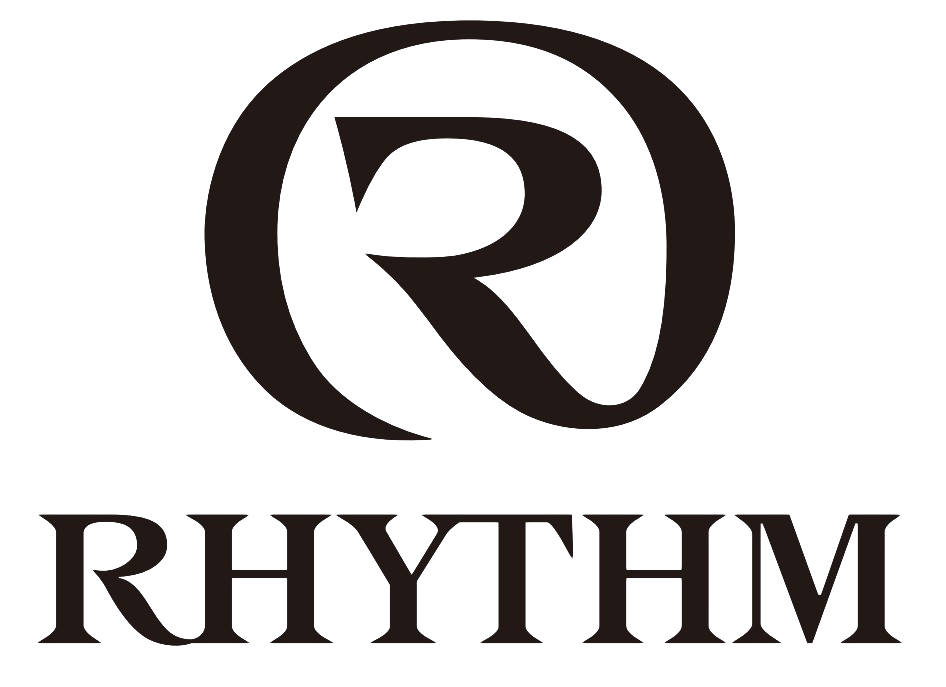
- Formerly: Noson Tokei Seisakujo (1946-1950); Rhythm Watch (1950-2020)
- Type: Public
- Industry: Precision equipment
- Founded: November 7, 1950; 75 years ago
- Headquarters: Omiya-ku, Saitama-shi, Saitama, Japan
- Key people: Hiromi Hirata (chairman); Takeo Yumoto (president)
- Products: Watches and parts, clocks, emergency broadcast radios, small fans, electronic equipment and parts, multipurpose small cameras, displays for small gauges, precision mold manufacturing, precision parts fabrication, connectors
- Operating income: ¥879 million
- Net income: ¥1,061 million
- Total assets: ¥12.37 billion
- Number of employees: 3,292
- Website: rhythm.co.jp

Rhythm Co., Ltd. (リズム株式会社, Rizumu Kabushiki-gaisha) (TYO: 7769), formerly Rhythm Watch until 2020) is a Japanese global corporate group based in Saitama, Japan. The company was founded in 1950 as a clock company and has since expanded globally as a manufacturer of watches, clocks, precision equipment, connectors and small displays. From 1955 until 2003 it was headquartered in Tokyo.

== Clocks ==
Rhythm was founded as a clock company in 1950 and as such is the most well-known aspect of the company.

=== Musical and chiming clocks ===
In 1987, Rhythm introduced their first musical clocks, the Dream House and the Village Kate (video) under the Citizen brand, which were inspired by cuckoo clocks. In 1988, Rhythm introduced its series of musical clocks under the Small World brand (unrelated to the Disney ride "It's a Small World"). Such clocks from that early time period include the Small World Dual Bell Ringers and the Small World Performing Musicians, which all utilized simple square waves for sound synthesis. By the early 90s, new models used FM synthesis, and a few models were revamped with FM synthesis, with at least some using Yamaha ICs.

Dual Bell Ringers clock (released 1989, photo from Timeless Moments)

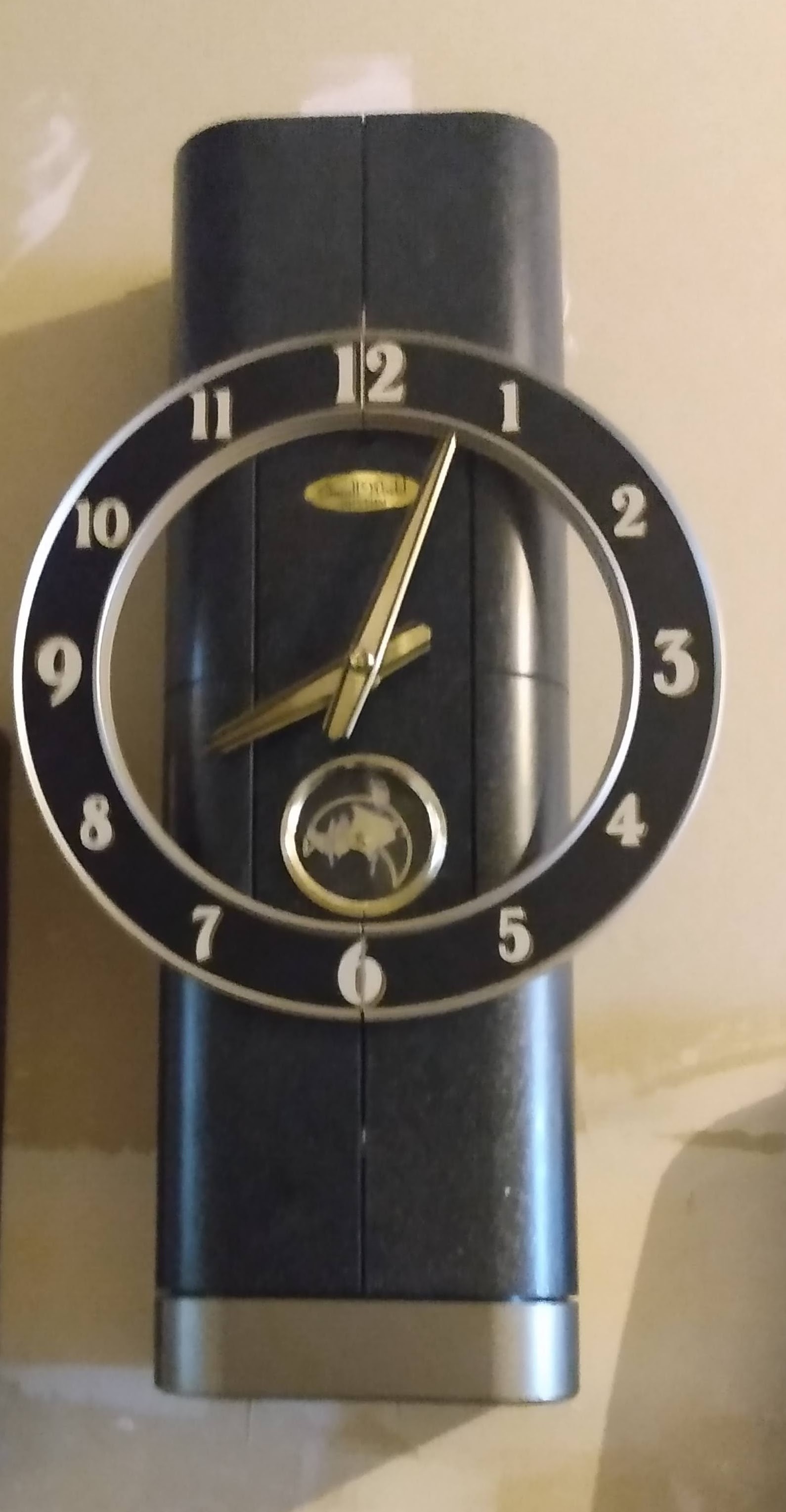
Story DX (released 1990)

Performing Musicians (released 1990, photo from Timeless Moments)

By 1997, a sound system called Dynamic Wave Sound (DWS) based on Digital waveguide synthesis was released, which had a unique, synth-like tone. By 2003, the Clarion Tone System (CTS) was also released, with a different, glass armonica-like tone, comparable to a blend of bells and organ sounds. In 2006, Rhythm introduced the Super Symphonic Sound (SSS), likely utilizing MIDI. However, it has been said that copyright issues with JASRAC led to the discontinuation of SSS and DWS in 2009, while CTS remains in use.

DWS Timecracker (released 1990s-2000s, photo from Timeless Moments)

CTS Nostalgia Light (released 2007, photo from Timeless Moments)

SSS Encore (Released 2007, photo from Timeless Moments)

In 2019, Rhythm released a new sound system called Creative Sound, blending realistic instruments and synth sounds, alongside Harmonica Sound in the US. However, in the US, clocks with Creative Sound are still labeled as CTS.

Bloom (released 2019-2020, photo from Timeless Moments)

Rhythm has also made large scale public automaton clocks.

=== Other clocks ===
Rhythm also makes other clocks such as alarm clocks, cuckoo clocks, and time-only clocks.

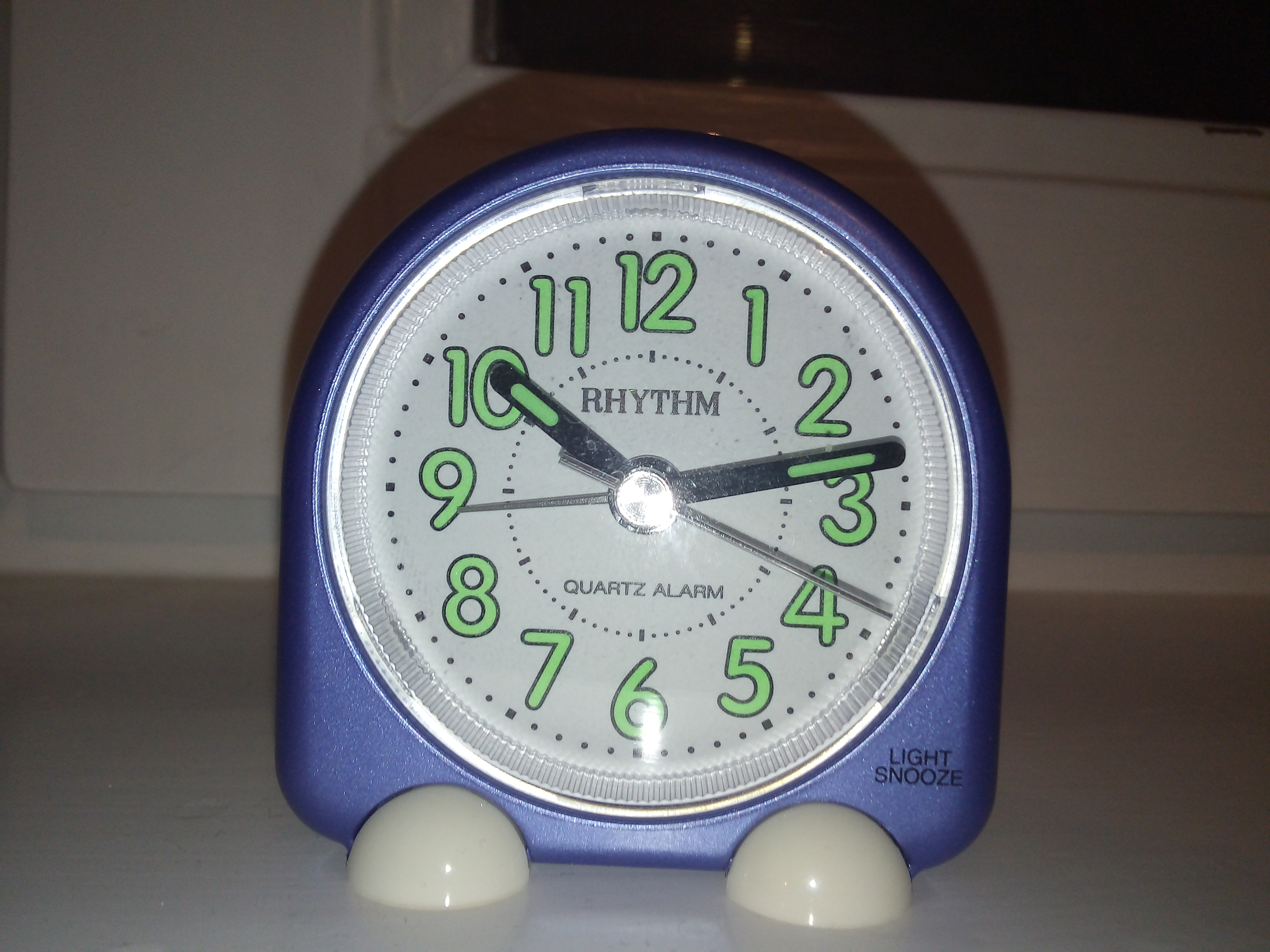
Rhythm alarm clock

== Other products ==
Rhythm also sells portable fans internationally. Rhythm sells humidifiers, scent diffusers and waterproof phone and tablet cases in Japan only.

== Closure and discontinuation in the United States ==
In 2025, it was announced that Rhythm would be closing down and discontinuing their American services. Rhythm USA was branched off as a subsidiary of the Japanese division, first taking off in 1989 in New York, before shifting places to Atlanta, Georgia, where its headquarters sat from 1993 until its closure in 2025. As of now, Seiko appears to be the only clock manufacturer still left in both the Japanese and international markets. Seiko is still producing their Emblem and Disney Time series in Japan, while American consumers receive the Melodies in Motion series.

== Where to find ==
There are many YouTube channels online where demonstrations of Rhythm models can be found. As of 2025, the most credible source to find demos of Rhythm, Seiko and Citizen melody clocks is the channel Timeless Moments. Run by avid Ohio-based clock collector Chevy Ash, this channel is the most referred to in America. Other sources point to channels such as Kurage0814, 1993KAZUKI, and itagaki602.

== See also ==
- Seiko
- Citizen Watch
- Orient
