= Thirteenth stroke of the clock =

English phrase

Thirteenth stroke of the clock or "thirteen strikes of the clock" is a phrase, saying, and proverb to indicate that the previous events or "strokes to the clock" must be called into question. This is illustrated in the fictional case of "Rex vs Haddock" in which a remark by one of the parties is compared to the thirteenth stroke of a clock: not only is this thirteenth strike itself discredited, but it casts a shade of doubt over all previous assertions. This proverb puts forth the notion that if just one of someone's proclamations is wrong, or something of a process is wrong, then the correctness and accuracy of all the previous items are called into question. In a legal case it brings forth the notion that perhaps none of the party's claims are valid, given that one of them is obviously wrong.

A physicist and mathematician notes the problem with his variation on the same general idea. He points out that if a clock strikes the thirteenth hour then it has counted wrongly and reflects on the other twelve hours of the clock's strokes as then they could also be wrong.

Within the 24-hour clock system used for official and technical purposes throughout most of the world, there is a time that could be called "13 o'clock". However, the 24-hour system only came into widespread use in the English-speaking world during the 20th century, and most analogue clocks (including virtually all chiming or striking clocks) still work on the 12-hour system. A striking clock rings a bell once for each hour of the time. One ring is 1 o'clock, two rings is 2 o'clock, three rings is 3 o'clock, etc. Traditional clocks that strike a bell only mark 12 hours. After the twelfth hour with the twelve rings of the bell, the next hour should be with one ring only, indicating 1 o'clock plus twelve hours. Accordingly, with very rare exceptions, when a clock rings thirteen times it is indicating an impossible time and that the clock is not functioning correctly.

== Striking clock mechanism ==
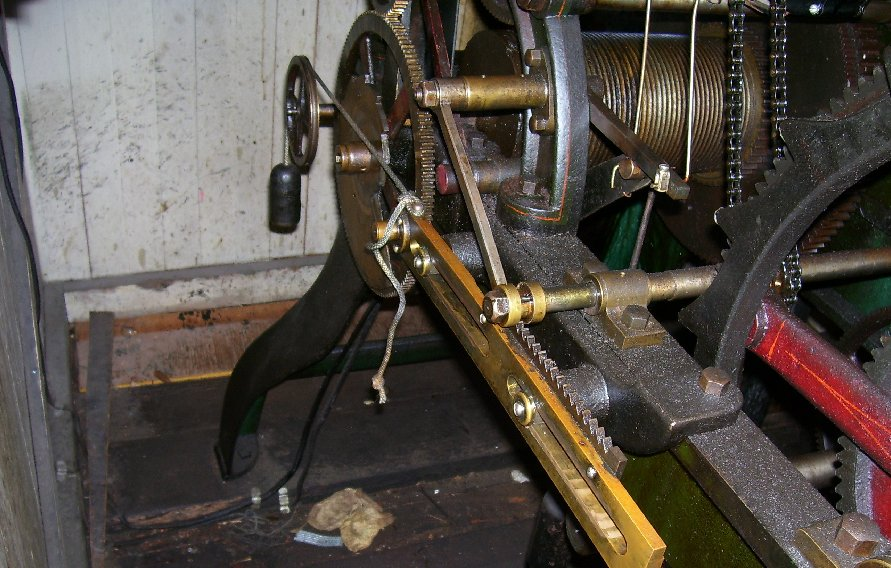
Part of tower clock internal works

A 100-year-old tower striking clock has a striking mechanism, called a snail, with indentations that vary in depth progressively from one to twelve. It rotates via a gear drive over a twelve-hour period. Shortly before each hour a rack with twelve cuts along its length is released to contact the snail. This makes the number of cuts available to activate the strike mechanism correspond to the depth of the snail at that hour.

Testing the rack in its place allows it to fall until the tail rests on the lowest step of the snail. The hook of the rack should then hold the rack so that there are twelve teeth gathered up. Trying it on the highest step of the snail, should catch the first rack tooth. This leaves only one to be gathered up. If the clock strikes thirteen when on the lowest step and two when on the highest, it shows that the end of the rack tail is a little too far off from the snail and must be set a little closer. If on the other hand the snail strikes the right number when on the lowest step and two when on the highest, then the proportion between the snail and rack is wrong. The rack travel is too great for the rack.

== Culture ==
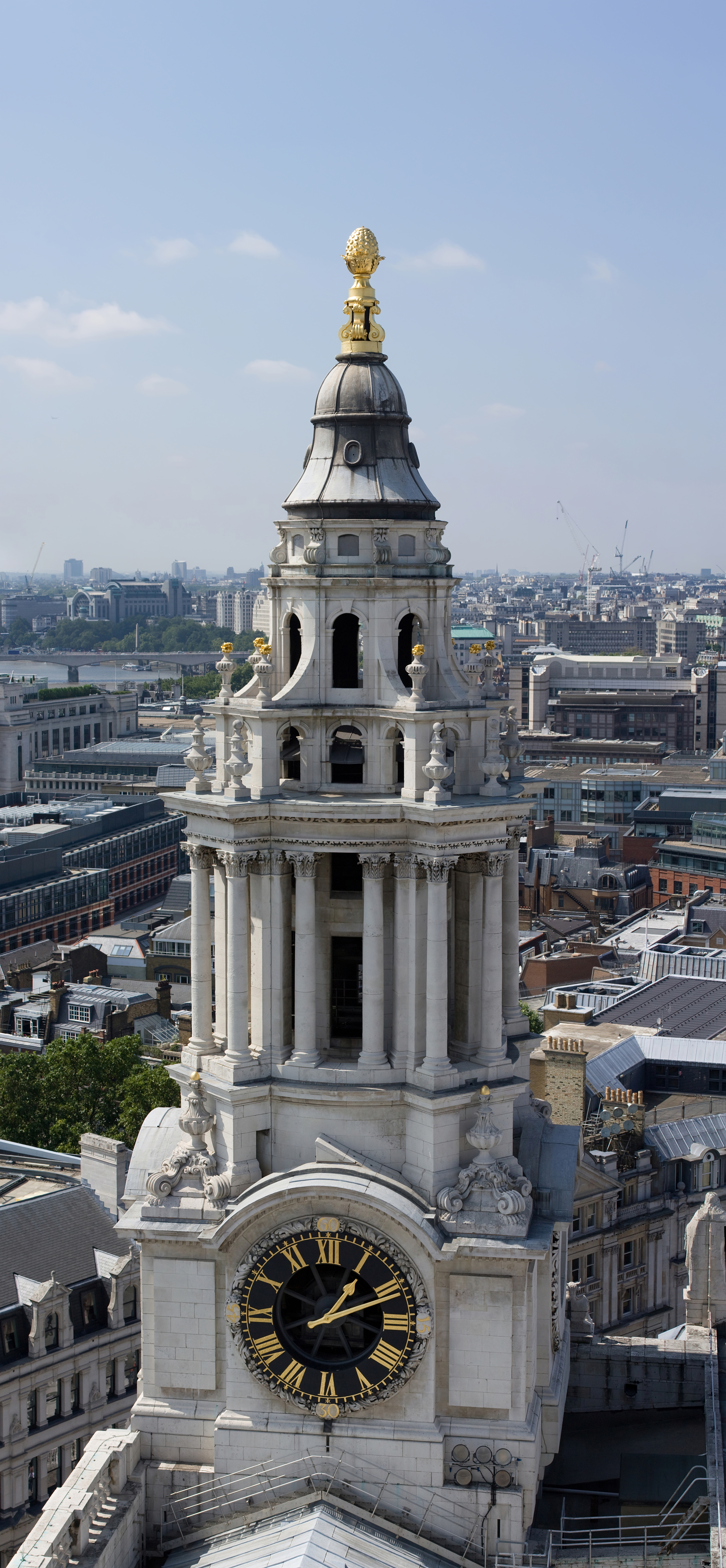
St Paul's Cathedral SW tower clock in London; the River Thames can be seen at left.

There is an 18th-century London legend of a clock that struck thirteen times and saved a man's life. The story goes that St Paul's Cathedral clock on one occasion struck thirteen bongs of the bell at midnight, with the result of saving the life of a soldier accused of sleeping at his post. An obituary notice of a John Hatfield that appeared in the Public Advertiser a few days after his death states that as a soldier in the time of William III and Mary II he was tried by a court-martial on a charge of having fallen asleep when on duty upon the terrace at Windsor. It goes on to say that he categorically denied the charge against him. He swore as a proof of his having been awake at the time that he heard St Paul's Cathedral clock strike thirteen, the truth of which was much doubted by the court because of the great distance. Affidavits were made by several persons verifying that the clock actually did strike thirteen instead of twelve, and the soldier was pardoned. (Note: This clock strikes so loud, that Mr. Reid, in a treatise on clocks, says he heard it in Windsor, June 1773, 22 miles (35 km) off. There is also a curious anecdote given in Mackenzie Walcott's Memorials of Westminster, as recorded in the Public Advertiser, 22 June 1770 : "Mr. John Hatfield, who died last Monday at his house in Aldersgate, aged one hundred and two, was a soldier in the reign of William and Mary, and was the person who was tried and condemned by a court-martial for falling asleep on his duty, upon Windsor Terrace. He absolutely denied the charge against him, and solemnly declared that he heard St. Paul's clock strike thirteen, the truth of which was doubted, because of the great distance. But whilst he was under sentence of death, an affidavit was made by several persons that the clock did actually strike thirteen instead of twelve, whereupon he received his majesty's pardon.")

There is a poem that alludes to this published in July 1873 called A Trip to Windsor by Timothy Scribble:

The terrace walk we with surprise behold,
Of which the guides have oft the story told:
Hatfield, accused of sleeping on his post,
Heard Paul's bell sounding, or his life had lost.

Adolf Hitler is quoted as saying, "I make it a principle not to stop until the clock strikes thirteen". This was in reference to his never giving up as Germany did in the First World War. This was said in November 1942 as the defeat of the German army at Stalingrad became certain, and the German army had retreated in North Africa. He wanted to point out to his enemy that he was not going to surrender under any circumstances, by using an analogy that theoretically could not happen.

Francis Egerton, 3rd Duke of Bridgewater, owned extensive coal mines near Manchester. He spent a fortune operating them and building a canal to carry the coal to Manchester and Liverpool. He noticed that his workers ceased working the moment the bell struck twelve times at twelve o'clock, which was lunch time. They, however, were slow in returning to work at one o'clock. The excuse was that they did not hear the clock strike just once. The Duke then had the clock made to strike thirteen times at one o'clock, so that the men could no longer use the excuse that they did not hear it.

Mark Twain is claimed to have said: "The thirteenth stroke of the clock is not only false of itself, but casts grave doubt on the credibility of the preceding twelve".

=== Literature ===
The idea of a clock striking thirteen times has shown up many times in literature. The most famous is the first line in George Orwell's Nineteen Eighty-Four when it starts with, "It was a bright cold day in April, and the clocks were striking thirteen". The famous children's book Tom's Midnight Garden by Philippa Pearce speaks of this phenomenon when it says "When Tom hears old Mrs Bartholomew's grandfather clock in the hall striking thirteen, he goes to investigate". Thomas Hardy wrote in Far from the Madding Crowd (1872): "This supreme instance of Troy's goodness fell upon Gabriel's ears like the thirteenth stroke of a crazy clock." (Chapter XXIX, Particulars of a twilight walk.)

== 24-hour clocks ==
Although most countries around the world use the 24-hour system for technical purposes and in documents such as timetables, such clocks do not strike the hour.

Most digital clocks can be set to show the time as, for example, 13:00, and this is frequently done. However, typical analogue clock design conserves the 12-hour system, and so does everyday speech. In English, in fact, the term "13 o'clock" is not used: in US military time, one would say "thirteen hundred hours" instead; in England, where most digital clocks are 24-hour, as are railway timetables, 13:00 is still conventionally referred to as "one", "one o'clock", "one o'clock pm", or "one pm". In other European languages, terms equivalent to "13 o'clock" are used, e.g. in French one usually refers to 1pm as "treize heures", though it would not be incorrect to say "une heure de l'après-midi", the equivalent of "1 pm".

== See also ==
- 24-hour clock

== Bibliography ==
- Beissinger, Janet (2006). The cryptoclub: using mathematics to make and break secret codes. Wellesley, Massachusetts: A K Peters. ISBN 1-56881-223-X.
- Bicknell, Treld Pelkey (2000). How to Write & Illustrate Children's Books and Get Them Published!. Cincinnati, Ohio: Writer's Digest Books. ISBN 1-58297-013-0.
- Chambers, Robert (1862). The book of days: a miscellany of popular antiquities in connection with the calendar, including anecdote, biography, & history, curiosities of literature and oddities of human life and character, Volume 1. Edinburgh: W. & R. Chambers.
- Collis, Harry (1995). 101 American English riddles: understanding language and culture through humor. Lincolnwood, Illinois: Passport Books. ISBN 0-8442-5606-4.
- "The Duke's Ruse". Chatterbox. No. 38. Boston: Dana Estes & Co. 1906. p. 299.
- Giblin, James (2002). The life and death of Adolf Hitler. New York: Clarion Books. ISBN 0-395-90371-8.
- Hasluck, Paul N. (1994). Clock Jobbers Handybook. TEE Publishing. ISBN 1-85761-049-0.
- Orwell, George (1992). Nineteen Eighty Four. New York: Knopf. ISBN 0-679-41739-7.
- Paliwal, Bhudatt (1989). Prediction of Response in Radiation Therapy: Analytical models and modelling. New York: American Institute of Physics. ISBN 0-88318-624-1.
- Perelmuter, Anatoly V. (2003). Numerical structural analysis: methods, models and pitfalls. New York: Springer. ISBN 3-540-00628-1.
- Prosser, William Lloyd (1989). The Judicial humorist: a collection of judicial opinions and other frivolities. Littleton, Colorado: F.B. Rothman. ISBN 0-8377-2518-6.
- Tigar, Michael E. (2004). Examining witnesses. Chicago: American Bar Association. ISBN 1-59031-256-2.
