= Clock face =

Dial of an analogue clock or watch

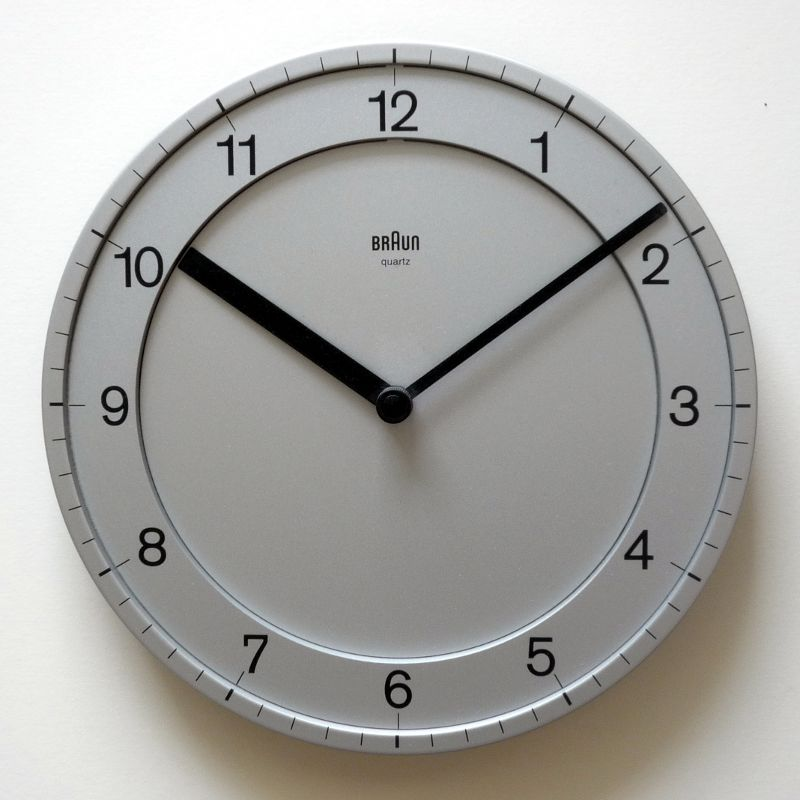
A wall clock showing the time at 10:09

A clock face is the part of an analog clock (or watch) that displays time through the use of a flat dial with reference marks, and revolving pointers turning on concentric shafts at the center, called hands (or arms). In its most basic, globally recognized form, the periphery of the dial is numbered 1 through 12 indicating the hours in a 12-hour cycle, and a short hour hand makes two revolutions in a day. A long minute hand makes one revolution every hour. The face may also include a second hand, which makes one revolution per minute. The term is less commonly used for the time display on digital clocks and watches.

A second type of clock face is the 24-hour analog dial, widely used in military and other organizations that use 24-hour time. This is similar to the 12-hour dial above, except it has hours numbered 1–24 (or 0–23) around the outside, and the hour hand makes only one revolution per day. Some special-purpose clocks, such as timers and sporting event clocks, are designed for measuring periods less than one hour. Clocks can indicate the hour with Roman numerals or Hindu–Arabic numerals, or with non-numeric indicator marks. The two numbering systems have also been used in combination, with the prior indicating the hour and the latter the minute. Grandfather clocks (also known as Longcase clocks) typically use Roman numerals for the hours. Clocks using only Arabic numerals first began to appear in the mid-18th century.

The clock face is so familiar that the numbers are often omitted and replaced with unlabeled graduations (marks), particularly in the case of watches. Occasionally, markings of any sort are dispensed with, and the time is read by the angles of the hands.

== Reading a modern clock face ==
'12:14' in both analog and digital representations. In the analog clock, the minute hand is on "14" minutes, and the hour hand is moving from "12" to "1" – this indicates a time of 12:14.

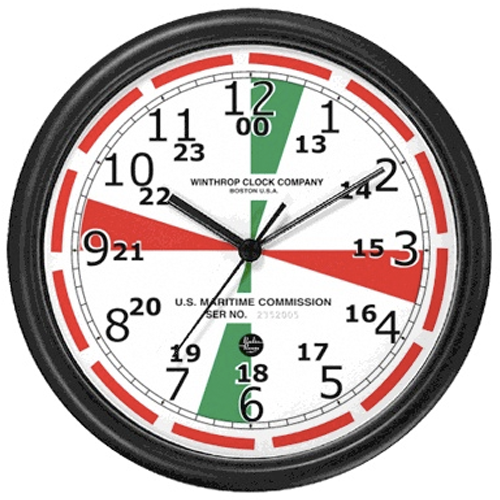
A ship's radio room wall clock during the age of wireless telegraphy showing '10:09' and 36 seconds'. The green and red shaded areas denote 3 minute periods during which radio silence was maintained to facilitate listening for distress calls at 2182 kHz and 500 kHz respectively to change the time.

Most modern clocks have the numbers 1 through 12 printed at equally spaced intervals around the periphery of the face with the 12 at the top, indicating the hour, and on many models, sixty dots or lines evenly spaced in a ring around the outside of the dial, indicating minutes and seconds. The time is read by observing the placement of several "hands", which emanate from the centre of the dial:

- A short, thick "hour" hand;
- A long, thinner "minute" hand;
- On some models, a very thin "second" or "sweep" hand

All three hands continuously rotate around the dial in a clockwise direction, i.e. in the direction of the increasing numbers.

- The second, or sweep, hand moves relatively quickly, taking a full minute (sixty seconds) to make a complete rotation from 12 to 12. For every rotation of the second hand, the minute hand will move from one minute mark to the next.
- The minute hand rotates more slowly around the dial. It takes one hour (sixty minutes) to make a complete rotation from 12 to 12. For every rotation of the minute hand, the hour hand will move from one hour mark to the next.
- The hour hand moves slowest of all, taking half a day (twelve hours) to make a complete rotation. It starts from "12" at midnight, makes one rotation until it is pointing at "12" again at noon, and then makes another rotation until it is pointing at "12" again at midnight of the next morning.

== Historical development ==
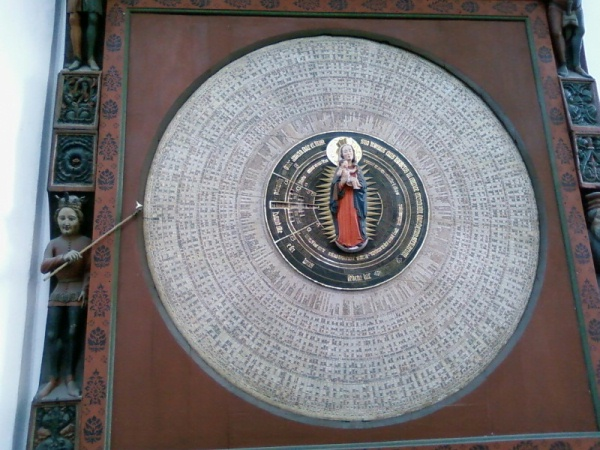
15th-century rotating dial clock face, St. Mary's Church, Gdańsk, Poland

The word clock derives from the medieval Latin word for "bell"; clocca, and has cognates in many European languages. Clocks spread to England from the Low Countries, so the English word came from the Middle Low German and Middle Dutch Klocke. The first mechanical clocks, built in 13th-century Europe, were striking clocks: their purpose was to ring bells upon the canonical hours, to call the local community to prayer. These were tower clocks installed in bell towers in public places, to ensure that the bells were audible over a wide area. Soon after these first mechanical clocks were in place clockmakers realized that their wheels could be used to drive an indicator on a dial on the outside of the tower, where it could be widely seen, so the local population could tell the time between the hourly strikes.

Before the late 14th century, a fixed hand (often a carving literally shaped like a hand) indicated the hour by pointing to numbers on a rotating dial; after this time, the current convention of a rotating hand on a fixed dial was adopted. Minute hands (so named because they indicated the small, or minute, divisions of the hour) only came into regular use around 1690, after the invention of the pendulum and anchor escapement increased the precision of time-telling enough to justify it. In some precision clocks, a third hand, which rotated once a minute, was added in a separate subdial. This was called the "second-minute" hand (because it measured the secondary minute divisions of the hour), which was shortened to "second" hand. The convention of the hands moving clockwise evolved in imitation of the sundial. In the Northern hemisphere, where the clock face originated, the shadow of the gnomon on a horizontal sundial moves clockwise during the day.

=== French decimal time ===
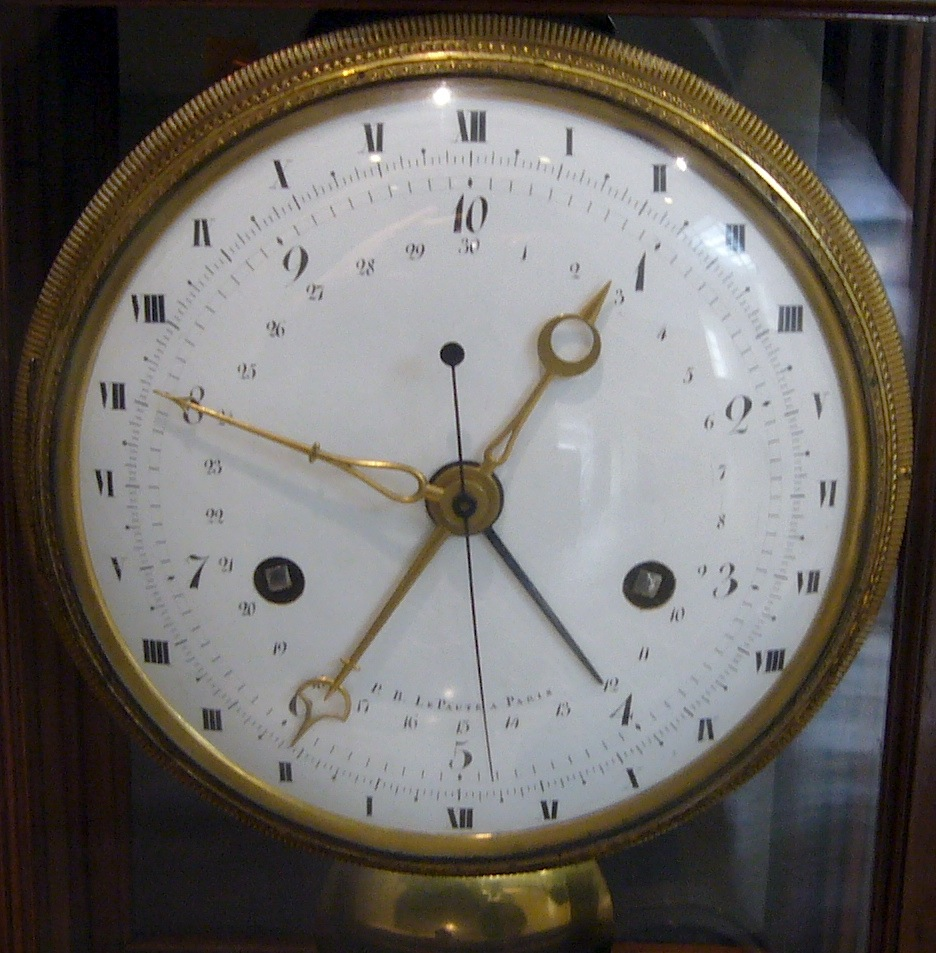
French decimal clock (with the 24 standard hours included around the outside)

During the French Revolution in 1793, in connection with its Republican calendar, France attempted to introduce a decimal time system. This had 10 decimal hours in the day, 100 decimal minutes per hour, and 100 decimal seconds per minute. Therefore, the decimal hour was more than twice as long (144 min) as the present hour, the decimal minute was slightly longer than the present minute (86.4 seconds) and the decimal second was slightly shorter (0.864 sec) than the present second. Clocks were manufactured with this alternate face, usually combined with traditional hour markings. However, it did not catch on, and France discontinued the mandatory use of decimal time on 7 April 1795, although some French cities used decimal time until 1801.

== Stylistic development ==
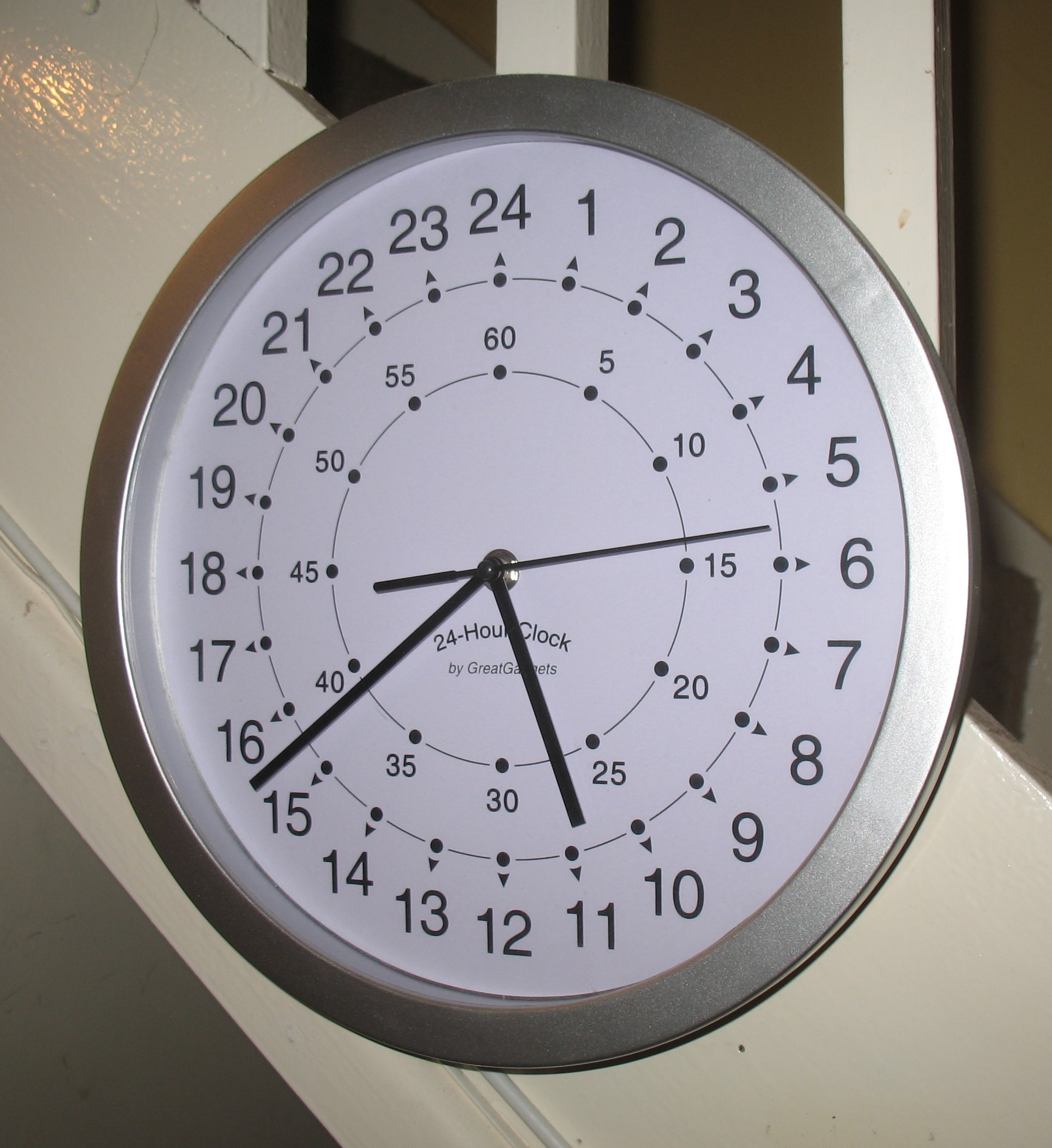
A modern quartz clock with a 24-hour face

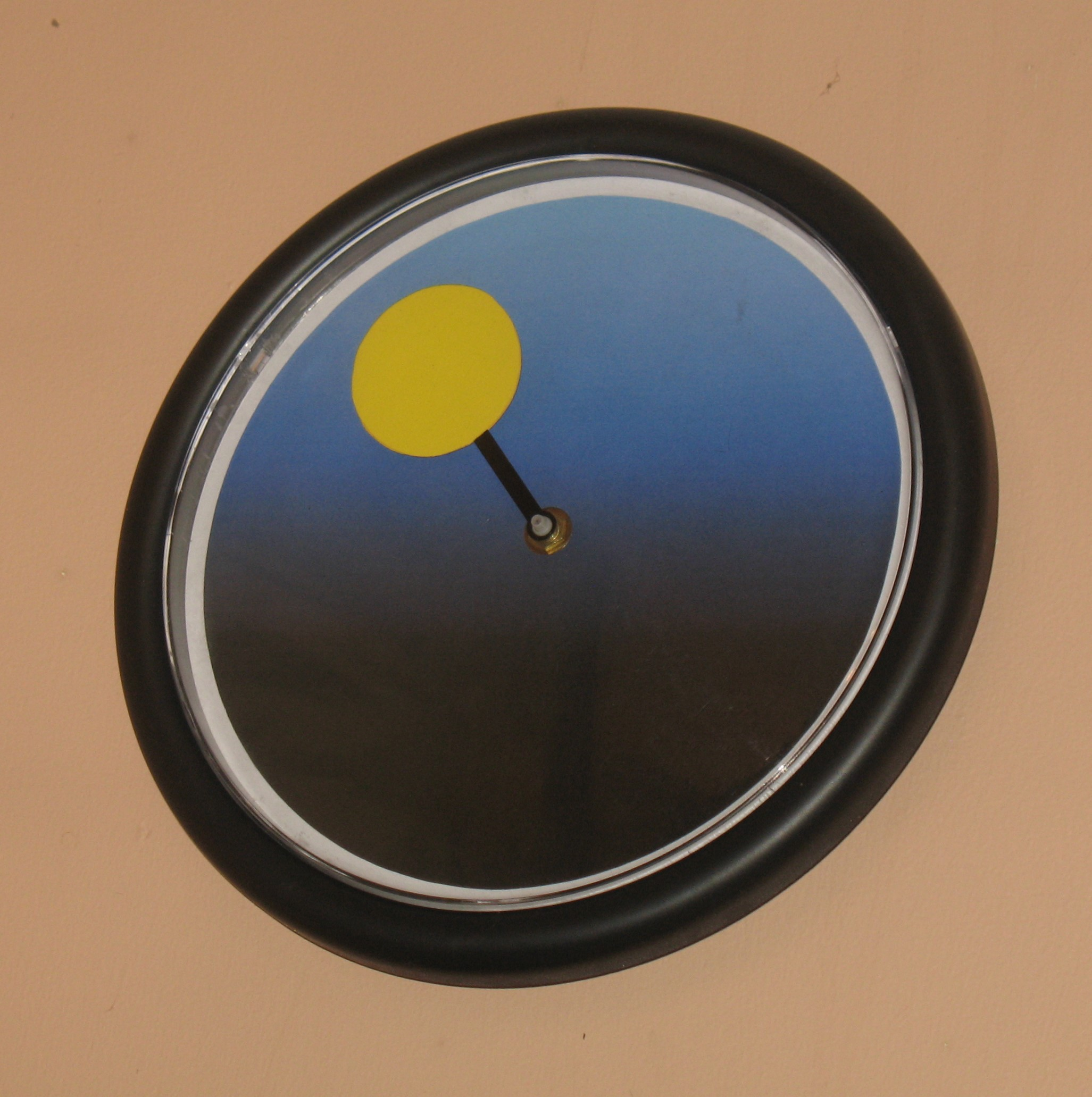
A simple 24 hour clock showing the approximate position of the sun

Until the last quarter of the 17th century, hour markings were etched into metal faces and the recesses filled with black wax. Subsequently, higher contrast and improved readability was achieved with white enamel plaques painted with black numbers. Initially, the numbers were printed on small, individual plaques mounted on a brass substructure. This was not a stylistic decision, rather enamel production technology had not yet achieved the ability to create large pieces of enamel. The "13-piece face" was an early attempt to create an entirely white enamel face. As the name suggests, it was composed of 13 enamel plaques: 12 numbered wedges fitted around a circle. The first single-piece enamel faces, not unlike those in production today, began to appear c. 1735.

It is customary for modern advertisements to display clocks and watches set to approximately 10:10 or 1:50, as this V-shaped arrangement roughly makes a smile, imitates a human figure with raised arms, and leaves the watch company's logo unobscured by the hands.

In the 1970s, German designer Tian Harlan invented the Chromachron, a wristwatch with a clock face that has no dials but a disc with pie-shaped pattern rotating by the minute over color patterns representing both hours and minutes.

== Technological obsolescence ==
In the 2010s, some United Kingdom schools started replacing analogue clocks in examination halls with digital clocks because an increasing number of pupils were unable to read analogue clocks. Smartphone and computer clocks are often digital rather than analogue, and proponents of replacing analogue clock faces argue that they have become technologically obsolete. However, reading analogue clocks is still part of American elementary school curricula; proponents of analogue clocks argue that their inclusion in the curriculum reinforces basic mathematical concepts that are taught in elementary school.

== See also ==
- List of largest clock faces
- Hexadecimal clock
- Clock position
- Roman numerals
