= Automaton clock =

Type of clock featuring automatons

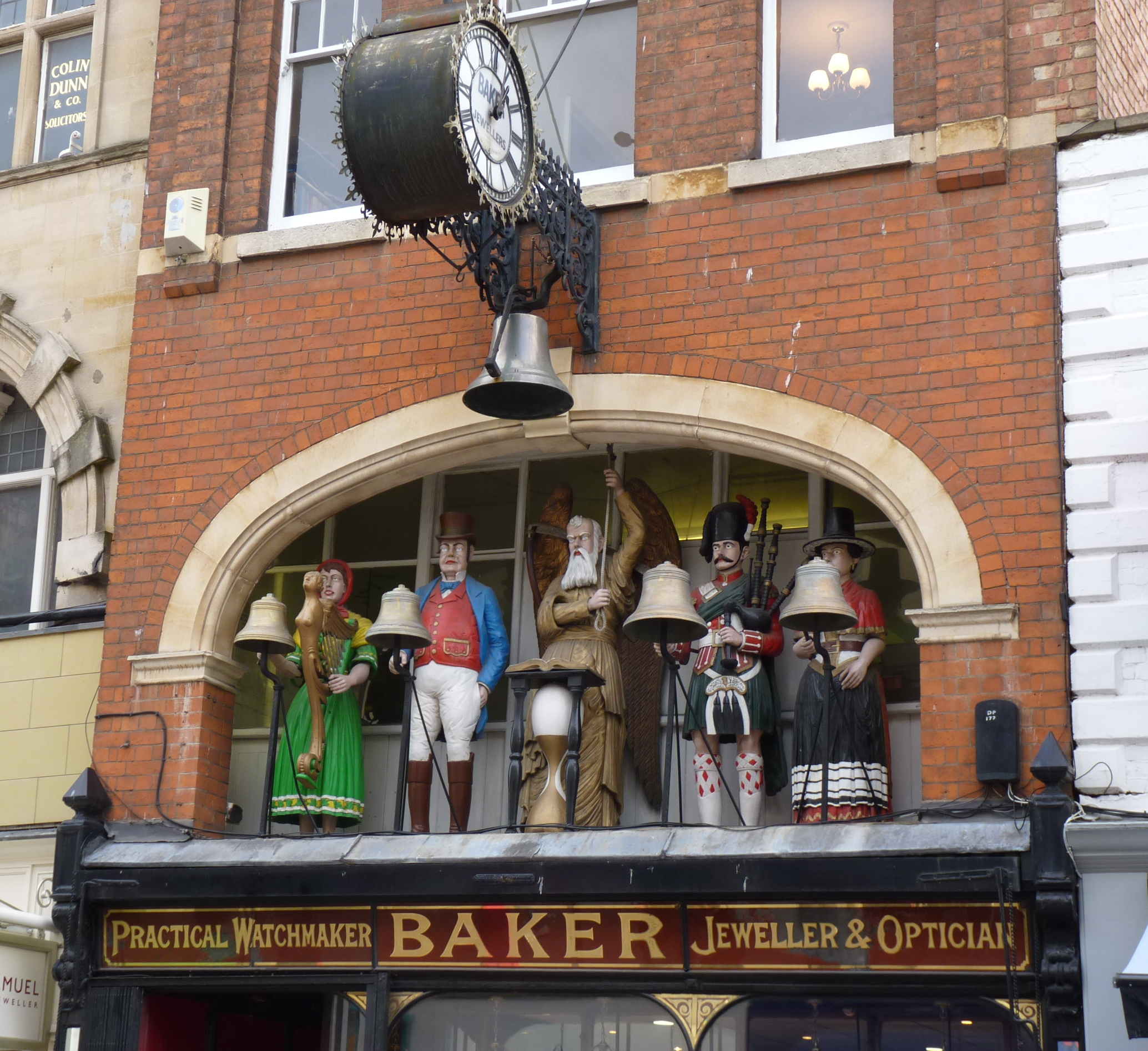
Automaton clock in Gloucester. The figures striking the quarter hours and the chimes represent the constituent countries of the United Kingdom. They are (L–R) Northern Ireland, England, Scotland and Wales. In the centre is Old Father Time, who strikes the hours.

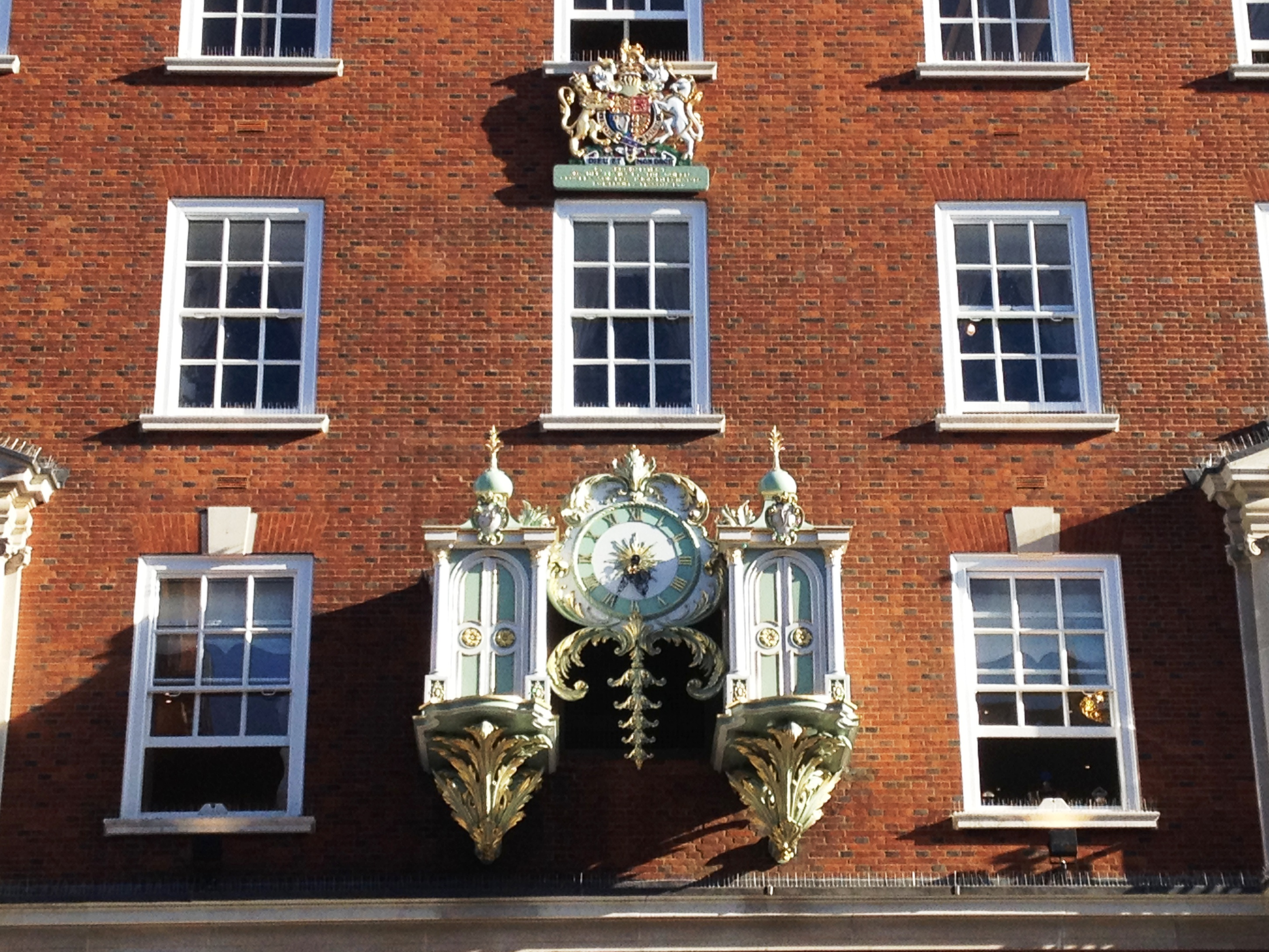
Fortnum & Mason's automaton clock on the main facade, Piccadilly Circus

A Cuckoo clock with mechanical automaton that flaps its wing and opens its beak in time to the sound of a Cuckoo's call to indicate the hours on the analogue dial

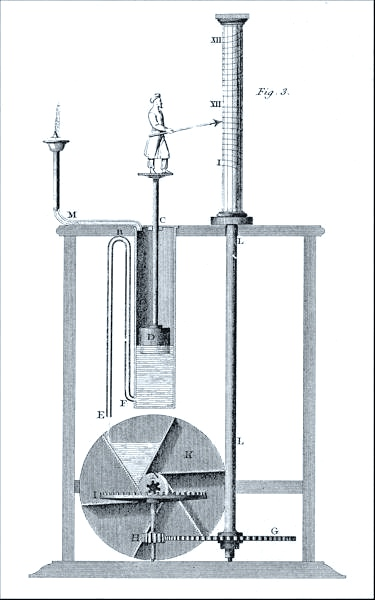
An early 19th-century illustration of Ctesibius's clepsydra from the 3rd century BC. The hour indicator ascends as water flows in. Also, a series of gears rotate a cylinder to correspond to the temporal hours.

An automaton clock or automata clock is a type of striking clock featuring automatons. Clocks like these were built from the 1st century BC through to Victorian times in Europe. A cuckoo clock is a simple form of this type of clock.

The first known mention is of those created by the Roman engineer Vitruvius, describing early alarm clocks working with gongs or trumpets. Later automatons usually perform on the hour, half-hour or quarter-hour, usually to strike bells. Common figures in older clocks include Death (as a reference to human mortality), Old Father Time, saints and angels. In the Regency and Victorian eras, common figures also included royalty, famous composers or industrialists.

More recently constructed automaton clocks are widespread in Japan, where they are known as karakuri-dokei. Notable examples of such clocks include the Ni-Tele Really Big Clock, designed by Hayao Miyazaki to be affixed on the Nippon Television headquarters in Tokyo, touted to be the largest animated clock in the world. In the United Kingdom, Kit Williams produced a series of large automaton clocks for a handful of British shopping centres, featuring frogs, ducks and fish. Seiko and Rhythm Clock are known for their battery-powered musical clocks, which frequently feature flashing lights, automatons and other moving parts designed to attract attention while in motion.
