= Church of Notre-Dame of Dijon =

Roman Catholic church in Dijon, France

Coordinates: 47°19′22″N 5°02′29″E

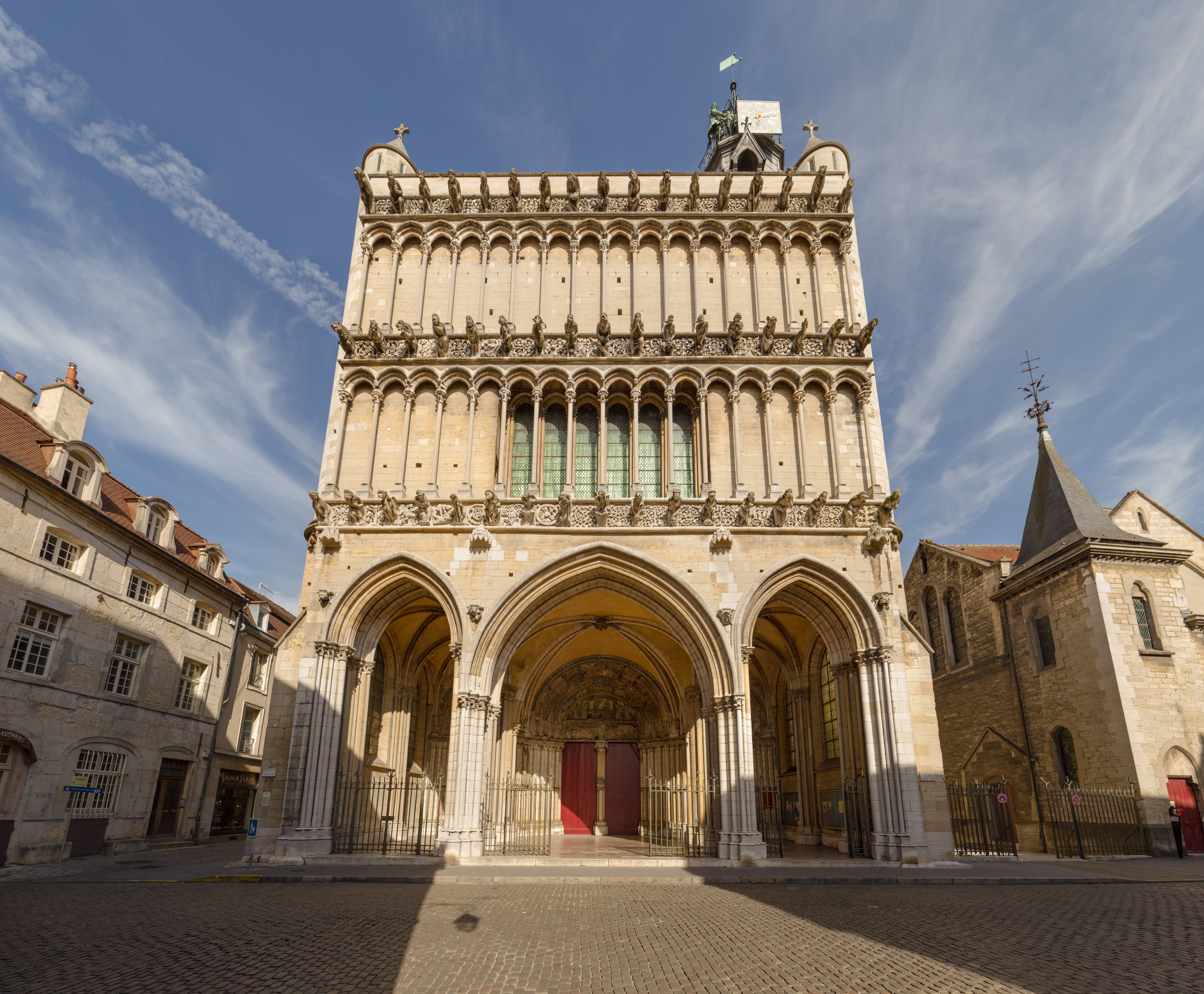
Church of Notre-Dame of Dijon

The Church of Notre-Dame of Dijon is a Roman Catholic church in Dijon. Considered a masterpiece of 13th-century Gothic architecture, it is situated at the heart of the preserved old centre of the city. It is located in Place Notre-Dame, near the Palace of the Dukes of Burgundy and opposite the rue Musette.

Work on the church began around 1230. The church contains the statue of Notre-Dame de Bon-Espoir, formerly called the Black Madonna. The church's decorations also include two symbols of Dijon: the jacquemart (bell-striking automaton) and the owl. The church was classified as a Monument Historique in the List of historic monuments of 1840. The chapel of the Assumption, the sacristy, and the gallery that links them have been listed as Monuments Historiques since 5 July 2002.

== History ==
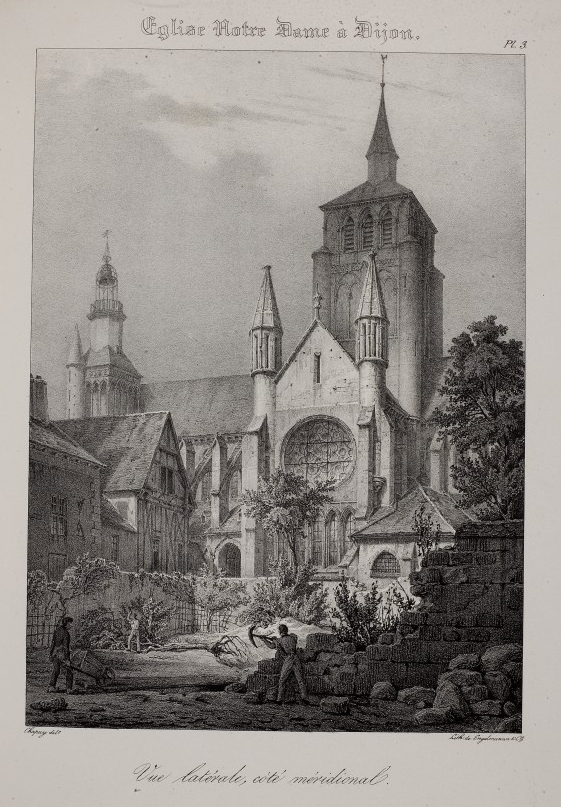
Notre-Dame de Dijon: early 19th-century view of the south side, showing the former tower

Before the second half of the 12th century, the site of today's Notre-Dame was occupied by a simple chapel, the chapelle Sainte-Marie, which was outside the city walls. Around 1150, this chapel was rebuilt in the Romanesque style. Then beginning around 1220, the people of Dijon built the Gothic church we see today on this site.

It was located in the middle of a popular quarter, so there was a lack of space for the building. The architect, whose name is now unknown, employed numerous novel techniques. For example, all the weight of the framing and the roof rests on pillars rather than flying buttresses, thereby allowing the maximum floor area for the interior.

From the 18th century on, this church had admirers, including Vauban and Eugène Viollet-le-Duc. The latter wrote in his Dictionnaire raisonné de l'architecture française that Notre-Dame de Dijon was "a masterpiece of reason".

The church was restored from 1865 to 1884, by the Parisian architect Jean Charles Laisné and not by Viollet-le-Duc as has sometimes been incorrectly written. The work involved returning the church to what was thought to be its original appearance. To achieve this, later additions to the building were removed, the tower at the crossing was re-established as a lantern tower, and the ruined sculptures were remade.

== Interior ==
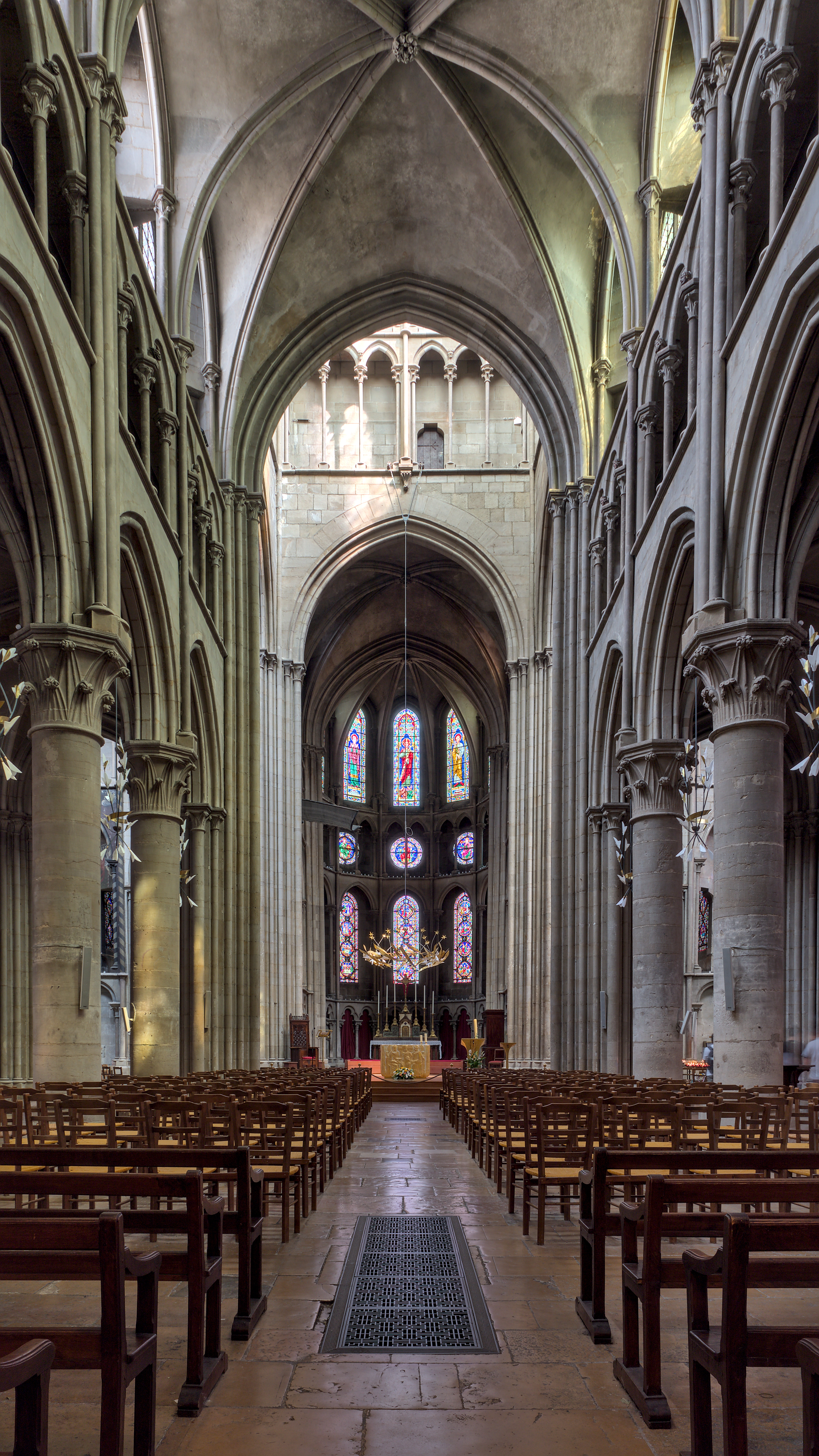
The nave

The church has a Latin cross floor plan. The central space, flanked by columns, has three levels: six high arcades supported by cylindrical columns, then above that a triforium covered by slabs which serve as the floor to the third level, a gallery with high windows.

The transept is also emphasised. Above a full base there are five lancet windows, and above that, a rose window. At the crossing of the transept there is a lantern tower, comprising a triforium surmounted by eight windows. There are two apsidioles, one at each corner between the arms of the transept and the choir.

The choir has four levels: a base decorated with blind trefoil arcades, then a level with lancet windows, then a triforium, pierced in the 17th century with large oculi, and a final level with high windows.

== Western façade and porch ==
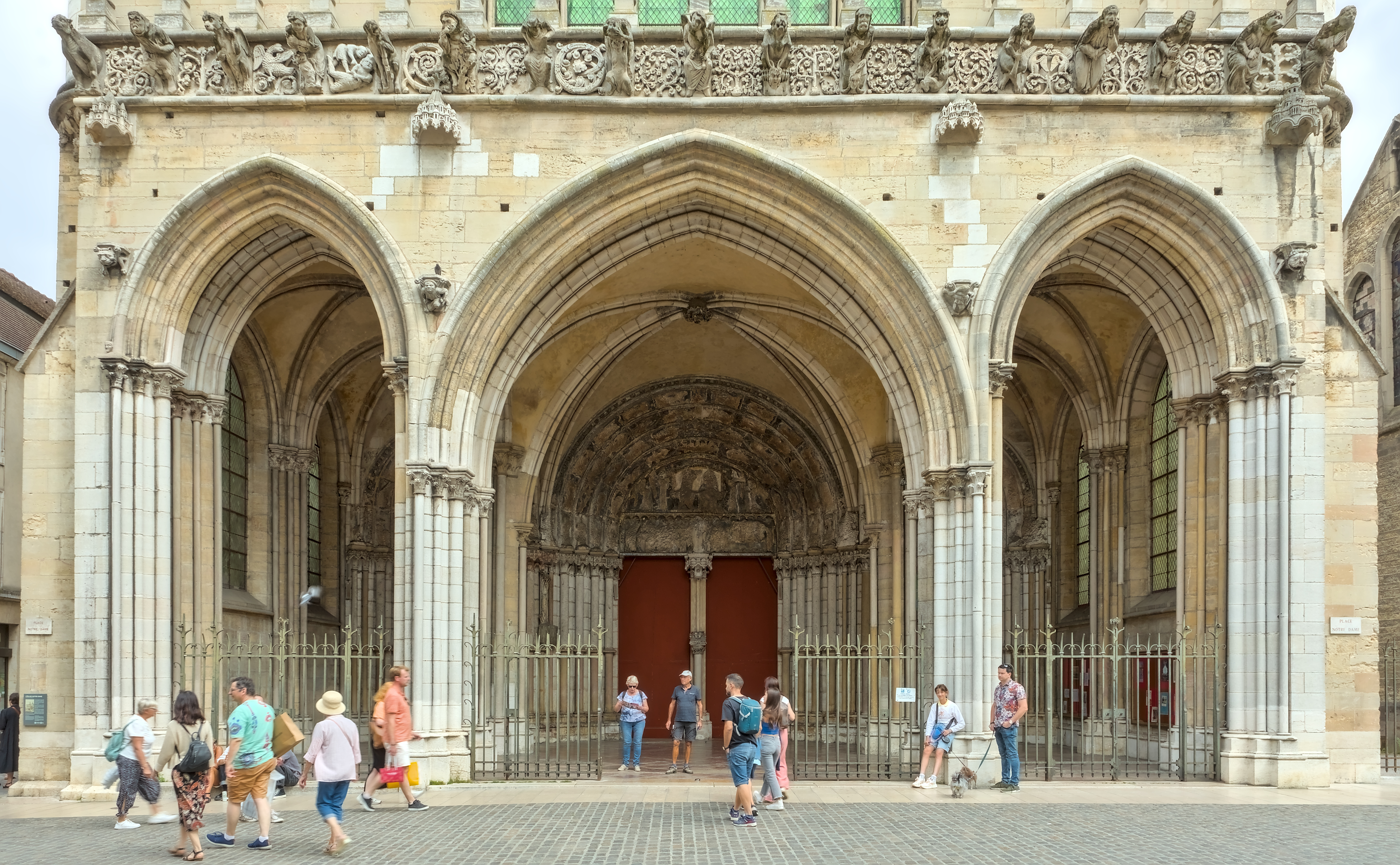
Western porch

Several historians have noted the originality of the western façade, in that it is much more planar than usual in French Gothic architecture. It is in effect a screen, 28.6 metres high by 19.5 m wide and 6.2 m deep. There are three levels. The lowest has three large arcades forming the entry into a porch whose vaults are supported by two rows of pillars. This porch has three doors opening into the nave. The doorway openings and the tympana used to be decorated with statues and sculptures, but these were destroyed in January 1794.

Above these arcades are two arcaded galleries, one above the other. On each of these two upper levels the arches rest on 17 small columns, each with a capital. Emphasising the top and bottom of these galleries are three string courses consisting of dummy (that is, not water-transporting) gargoyles alternating with metopes.

The façade is framed by a pair of corner buttresses, each surmounted by a turret enclosing a spiral staircase and topped with a conical roof.

Above the façade there was originally intended to be a pair of square towers, but only the foundations exist. The southern one serves as a support for the jacquemart.

== Gargoyles ==
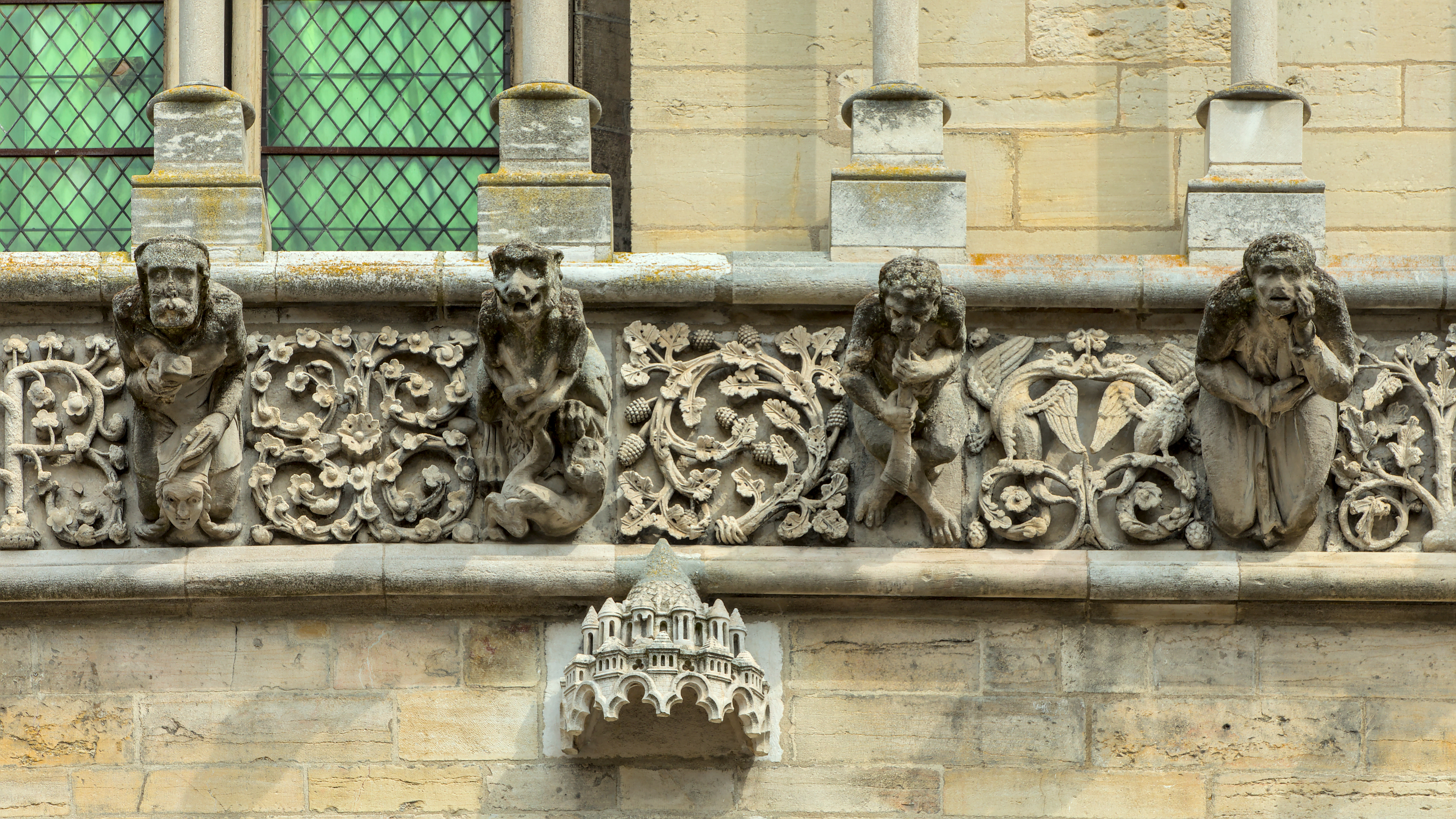
Gargoyles on the western façade

There are 51 grotesques on the western façade. Functional gargoyles are found on the lateral walls of the church and the walls of the apse.

According to the account of the monk Étienne de Bourbon, the original gargoyles were in place for only a short time: they were removed around 1240, following a fatal accident. A usurer was killed on the church forecourt as he was about to get married: a stone figure representing a usurer became detached and fell on him. His colleagues organised the destruction of all the dummy gargoyles on the façade, except for one at the upper right corner that survived until the 1960s, when it was replaced. Some 19th-century engravings do not show this gargoyle, but it can be seen in photos taken before 1880. The gargoyles at the sides and the back of the façade remain.

The dummy gargoyles which today decorate the façade, and which represent human beings, animals and monsters, were made in 1880-1882, during the restoration of the church. According to the archives, they were the work of seven Parisian sculptors: Chapot, Corbel, Geoffroy, Lagoule (also known as Delagoule), Pascal, Thiébault and Tournier.

== Jacquemart ==
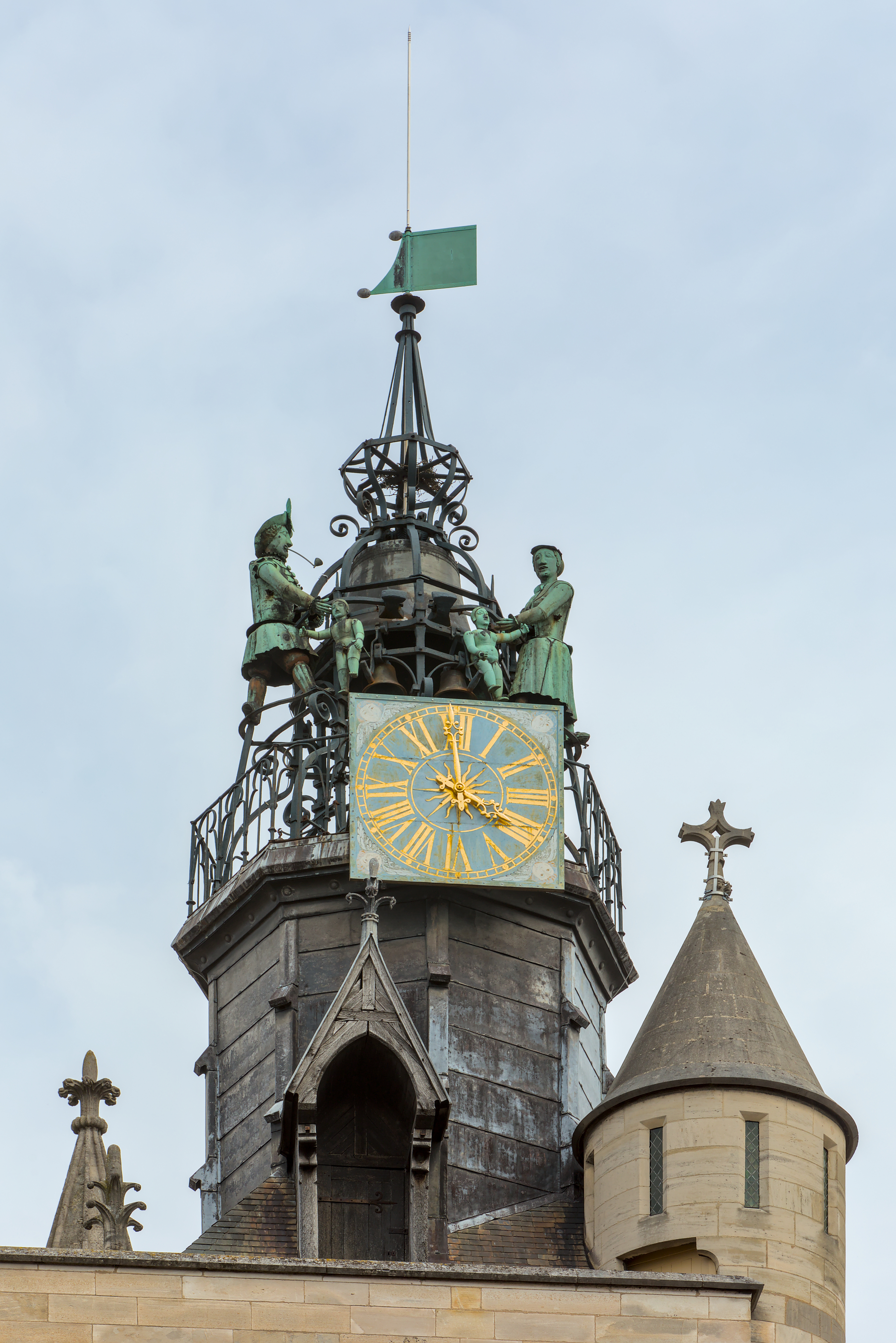
Jacquemart

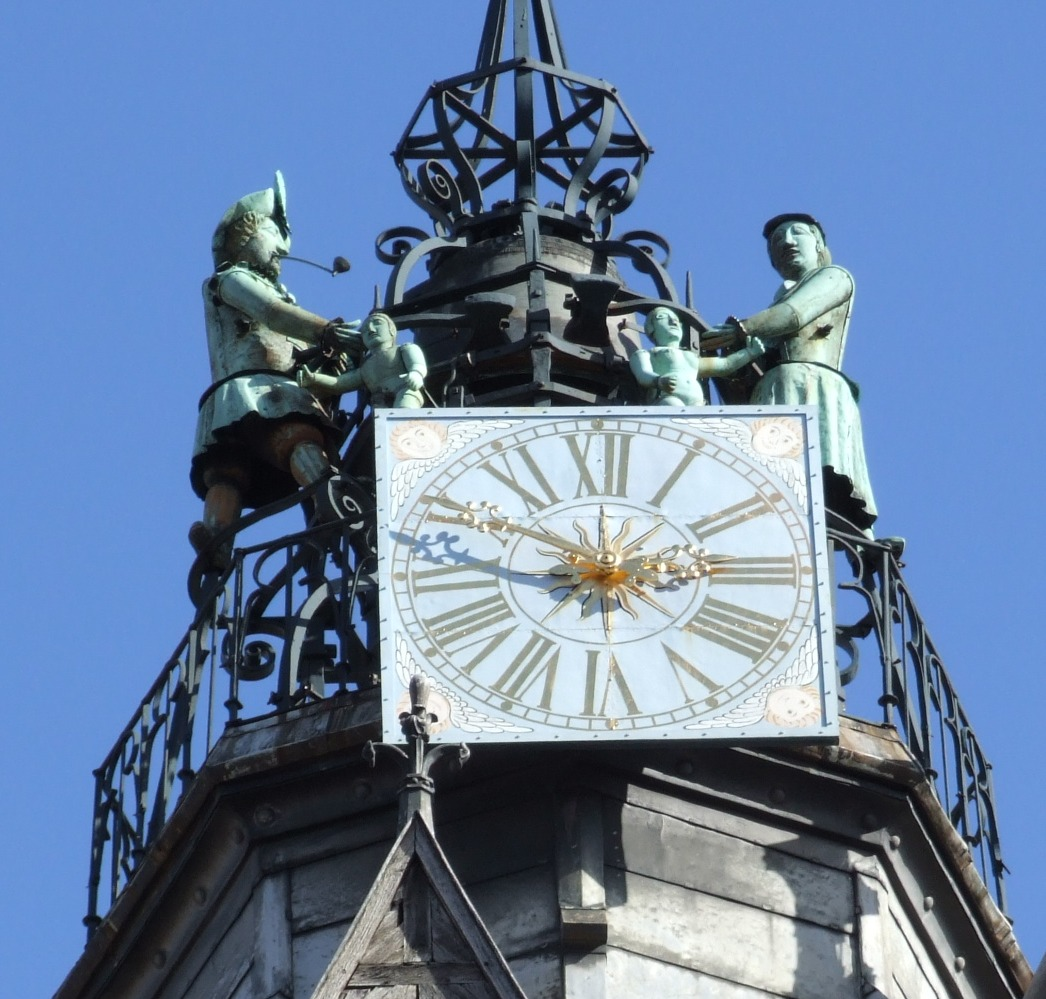
Close-up of Jacquemart

The clock with its jacquemart sits on a campanile rising from the base of the unbuilt south tower of the western façade. It has four metal automatons. Two of them, called Jacquemart and Jacqueline, sound the hours by striking a large bell with a hammer. The other two, their "children", Jacquelinet and Jacquelinette, strike the quarter hours, each on a small bell.

The automaton Jacquemart and the big bell were brought from Kortrijk (or Courtrai) in Belgium, after the looting of the town by the armies of Philip the Bold (Duke Philippe II of Burgundy) in 1382. In that year he went on a campaign to bring aid to his father-in-law, the Count of Flanders, caught unprepared by a rebellion that extended from Lille to Kortrijk. The town of Dijon provided the Duke with a thousand armed men for this campaign. After achieving victory, Philip sacked Kortrijk. The booty included a clock placed on the tower of the market building. This clock included a marvel - an automaton that struck the hour on a bell. The duke had the clock dismantled and offered it to Dijon, his capital.

The bell, which was broken during transport, was recast at Dijon. The duke's family and the people of Dijon pooled resources to place the clock and automaton on the western façade of Notre-Dame Church in 1383. The origin of the word jacquemart is uncertain - its use for the Dijon automaton is only attested from 1458.

A second automaton, depicting a woman, was added in 1651 to alternate with Jacquemart in sounding the hours. The people of Dijon called this new automaton Jacqueline.

In 1714, the Dijon poet Aimé Piron asked the municipality to provide the couple with children. In that year, or thereabouts, an automaton child, dubbed Jacquelinet, was added to sound the half-hours, and finally in 1884 a second automaton child, Jacquelinette, was added to strike the quarter hours with her brother.

== Statue of Notre-Dame de Bon-Espoir ==
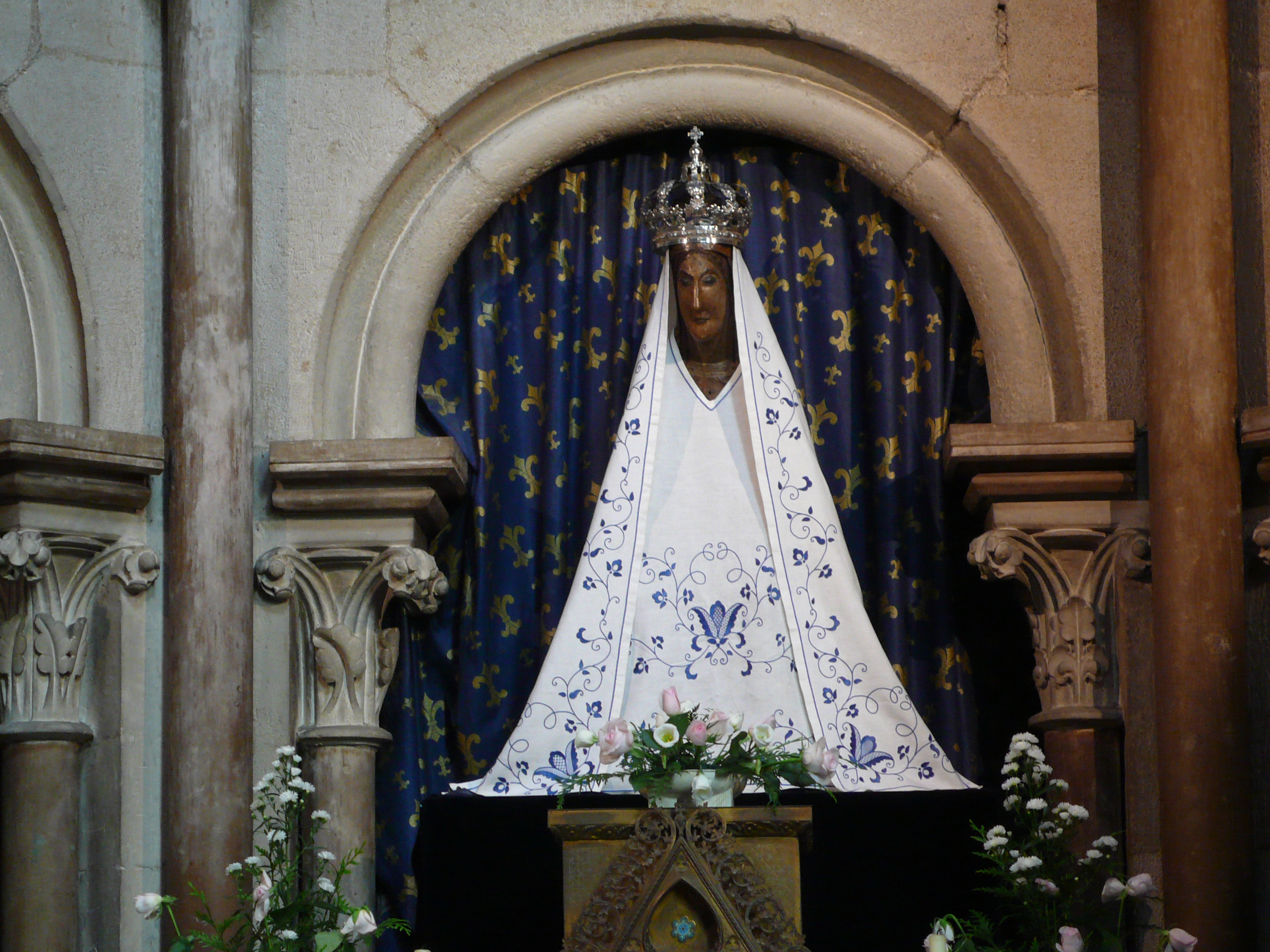
Notre-Dame de Bon-Espoir in robes, 2007

In the south apsidiole above an altar of goldsmithery is a wooden statue called Notre-Dame de Bon-Espoir (Our Lady of Good Hope). Dating from the 11th or 12th century, this statue of the Virgin is thought to be one of the oldest in France. Originally she was seated on a throne, holding the baby Jesus on her knees. Later the throne was removed and the back of the statue was sawn off and replaced by a piece of wood. The baby Jesus disappeared during the French Revolution, in 1794. By the 18th century, the Virgin's hands had been lost. In contrast, her face is almost undamaged. For several centuries, the statue was often shown crowned and wearing a robe. From 1959, it was decided to no longer use these decorations, so that everyone could see the complete Romanesque statue.

Originally, the sculpted clothes of the Virgin had a Romanesque polychrome decoration and her face was pale brown. In the 16th or 17th century, the statue was painted black, for an unknown reason. In 1945, this layer of paint was removed, revealing the original colours. However, a black tint was applied to the face only, to maintain the tradition. In 1963, this was removed, and the face returned to its original colouring. Now the statue can no longer be considered a Black Virgin — rather, it is a former Black Virgin.

This statue is now called Notre-Dame de Bon-Espoir (Our Lady of Good Hope), but in the 15th century, it had two names: Notre-Dame de l'Apport (Our Lady of the Market) and Notre Dame de l'Espoir (Our Lady of Hope). This latter name prevailed from the time of the deliverance of Dijon from the siege of 1513. In the 17th century, it took on its current name.

=== Miracles attributed to Notre-Dame de Bon-Espoir ===
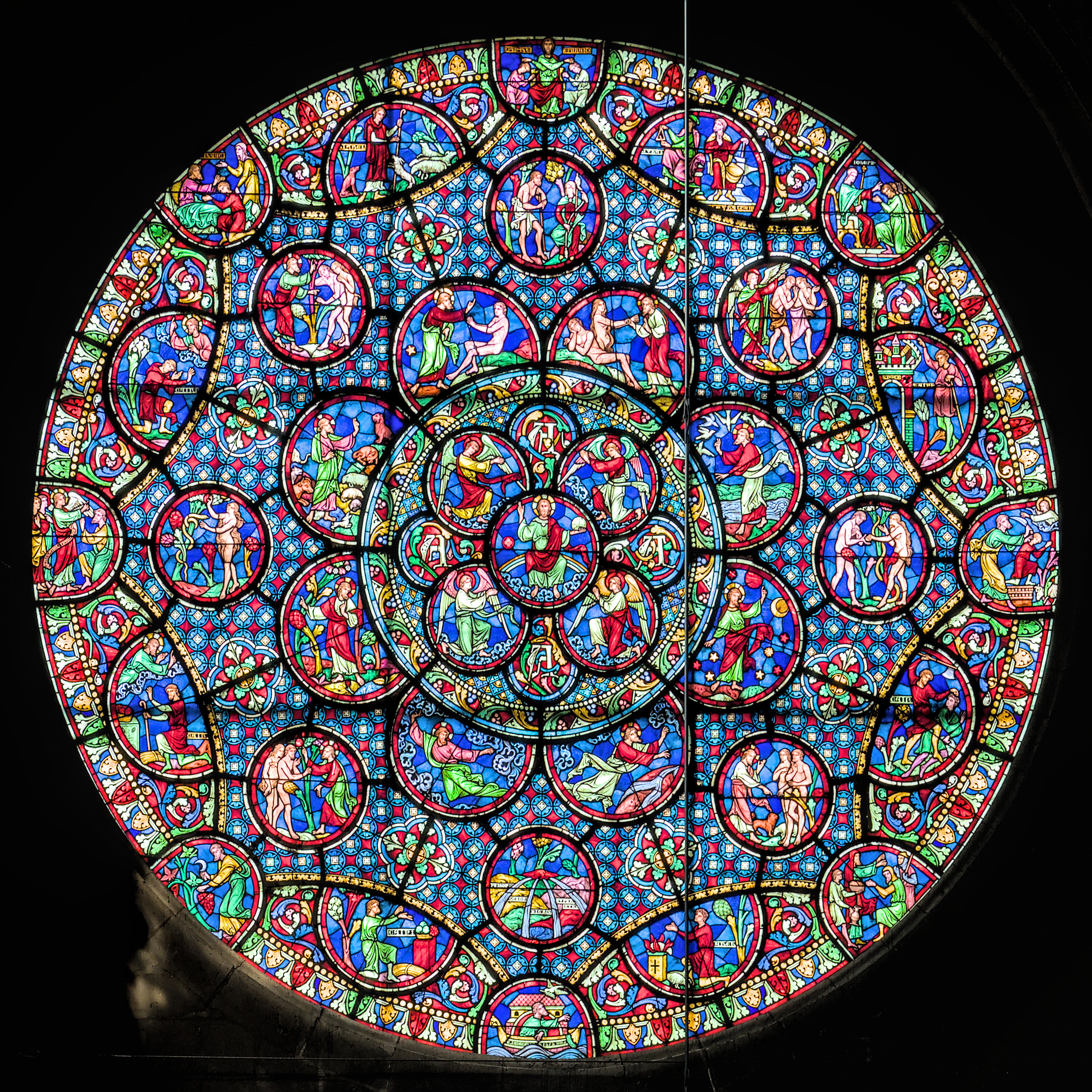
Last judgment rose window in the north transept

Several miracles have been attributed to Notre-Dame de Bon-Espoir. In September 1513, the Swiss army laid siege to Dijon and bombarded it. The situation seemed desperate. On 11 September, the citizens of Dijon carried the statue of Notre-Dame in procession in the neighbourhood of the church. Two days later, on 13 September, the Swiss unexpectedly left their camp. The citizens saw in this liberation the intervention of the Virgin. Around 1515, a tapestry was woven to commemorate the event. It adorned the church up to the Revolution, when it was sold. The mayor of Dijon bought it back in 1803 and kept it in the town hall. From there it passed in 1832 to the Musée des Beaux-Arts de Dijon, where it is on show.

A second liberation event attributed to the Virgin took place in September 1944. Dijon was occupied by the German army, which seemed to be intent on resisting the advance of the French troops. On 10 September, during a ceremony at the Notre-Dame Church, the bishop of Dijon made a public plea to Notre-Dame de Bon-Espoir to protect the town from the ravages that people feared would occur. In the night of 10–11 September, the Germans left Dijon, and the French army entered on 11 September, the day of the anniversary of the procession of 1513. Believers saw this as a miracle. On the initiative of some Dijon individuals, a tapestry commemorating the deliverances of 1513 and 1944, titled Terribilis, was commissioned from the artist and monk Dom Robert. Made between 1946 and 1950 at the Gobelins Manufactory, it was placed in 1950 in the church, where it is today on display under the organ.

== Owl ==
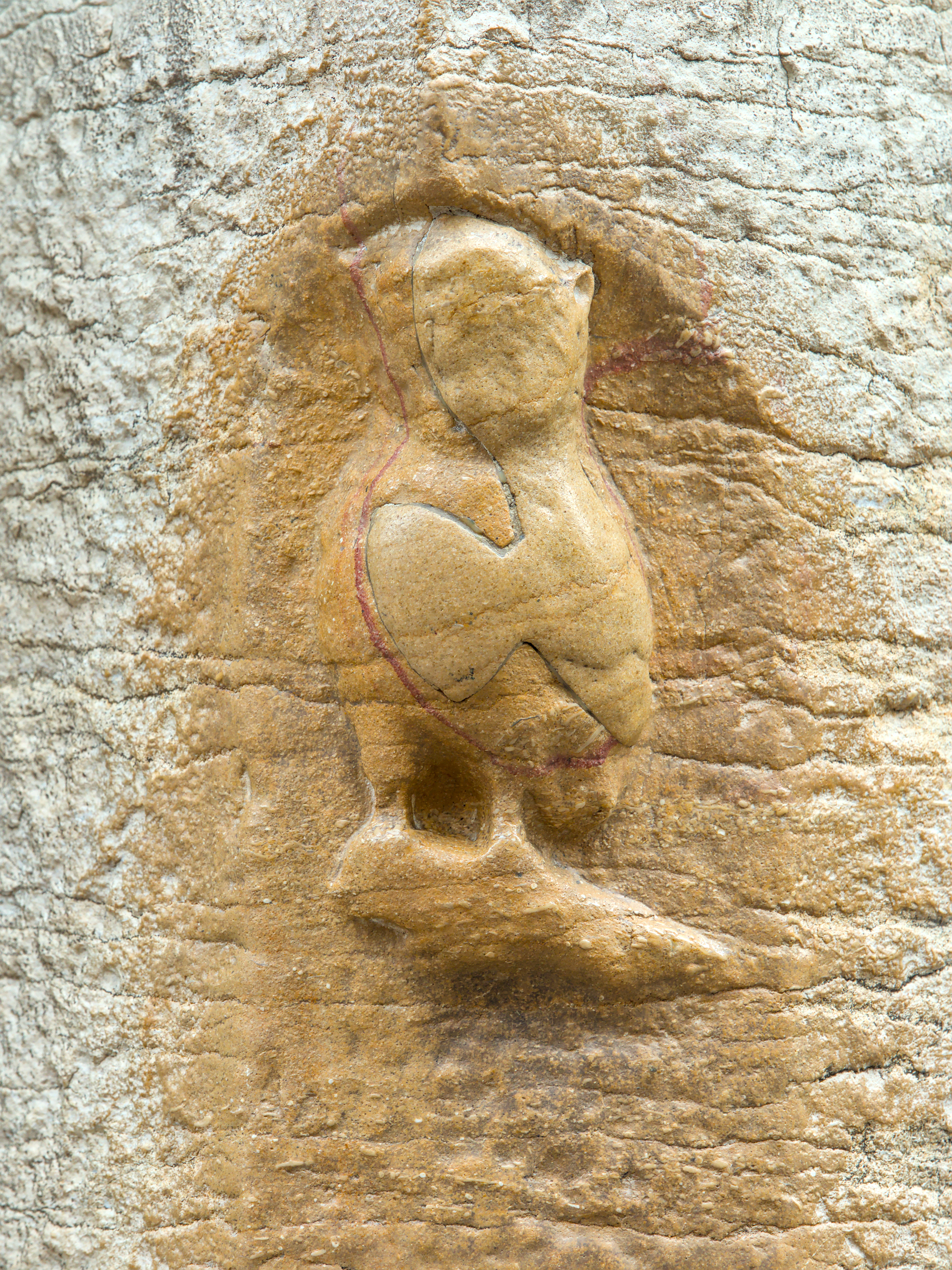
The owl after 2001.

On the north side of the church is a chapel bordering on rue de la Chouette (Owl Street), a pedestrian way. A corner of a buttress of this chapel bears a sculpted bird thought to represent an owl. The ornament could possibly be the personal mark of a stonemason. It cannot be the signature of the original church's architect, as is sometimes suggested, for the chapel was built in the late 15th or early 16th century—several centuries after the original church. The owl became worn over the centuries because of a superstition that luck would accompany anyone who stroked the bird with their left hand while making a wish. As a result, the sculpture lacks detail.

On 5 January 2001 a vandal damaged the owl with several blows of a hammer. A mould of the owl, made in 1988 by an expert from the Louvre, served as a model for the repair completed in February 2001. The restored owl, now under video surveillance, was officially inaugurated on 12 May 2001.

The sculpture continues to serve as a symbol of the city. The office of tourism chose the owl in 2001 as its symbol for the Parcours de la Chouette (Owl Walk), a tourist trail around the historic centre. 22 square plaques mark out the walk, each one bearing the image of an owl. The city's football club, Dijon Football Côte d'Or, has long used an owl as its emblem.

== Stained-glass windows ==
In the 13th century, the church had stained-glass windows of high quality. Only five of these, made around 1235, remain; they are the lancet windows of the north transept. These represent episodes from the life of Saint Peter (the first two on the left) and Saint Andrew (the other three).

From 1874 to 1897, the stained-glass artist Édouard Didron made 58 new windows, inspired by these five originals. The biggest are the rose windows of the north and south transepts, each 6 metres in diameter.

== Gallery ==
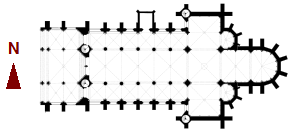
Floor plan of Notre-Dame of Dijon

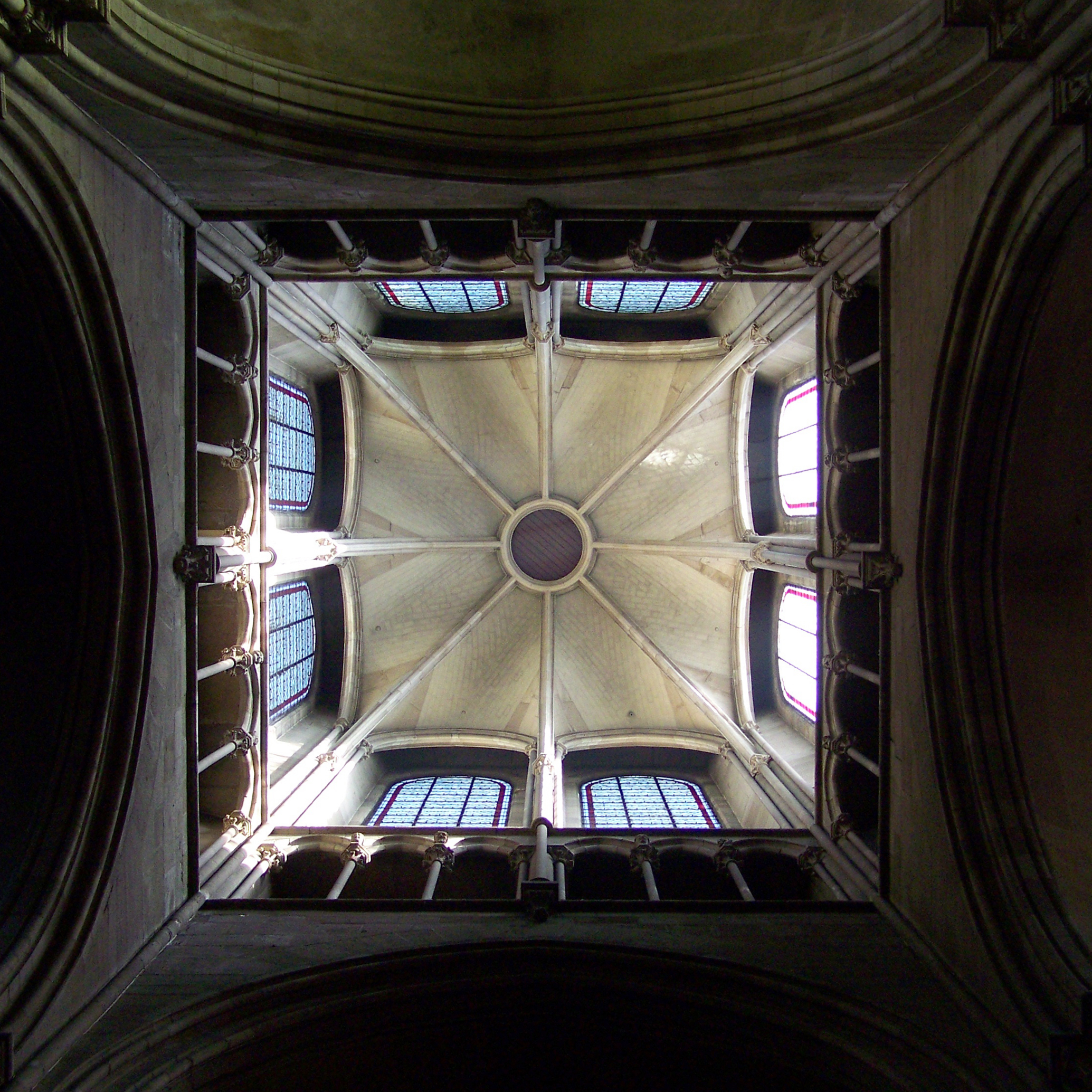
Interior of the lantern tower

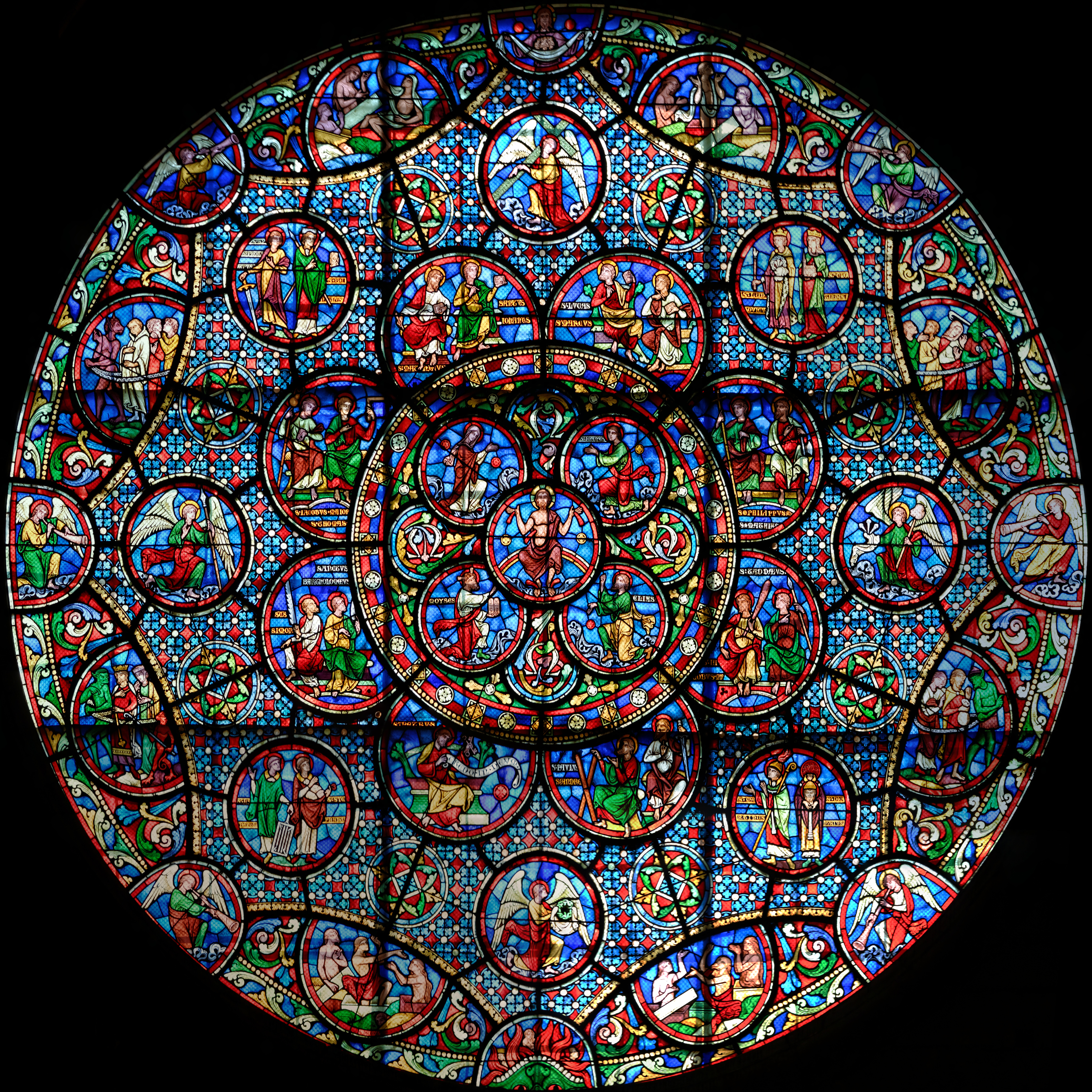
South rose window

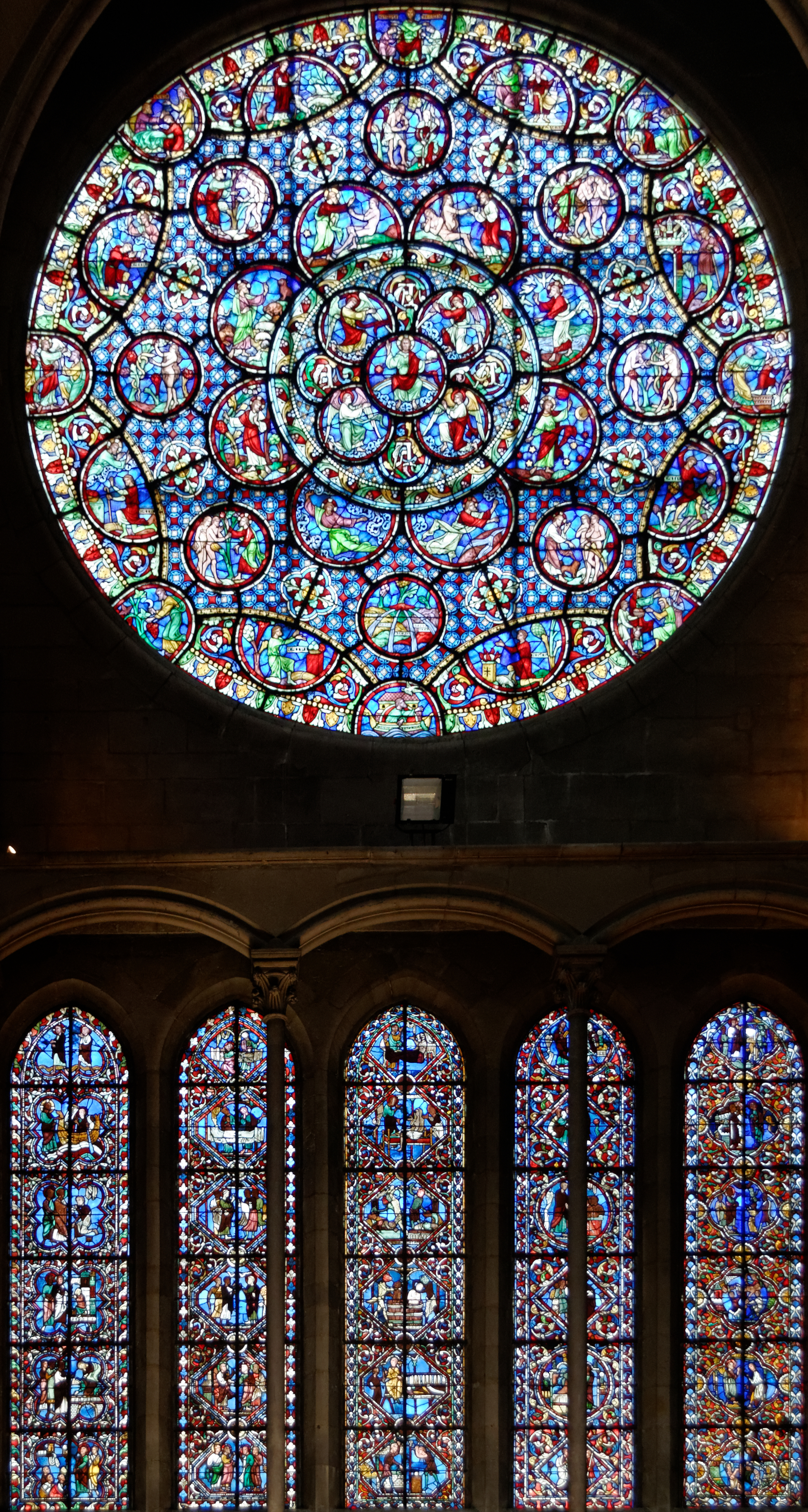
North transept

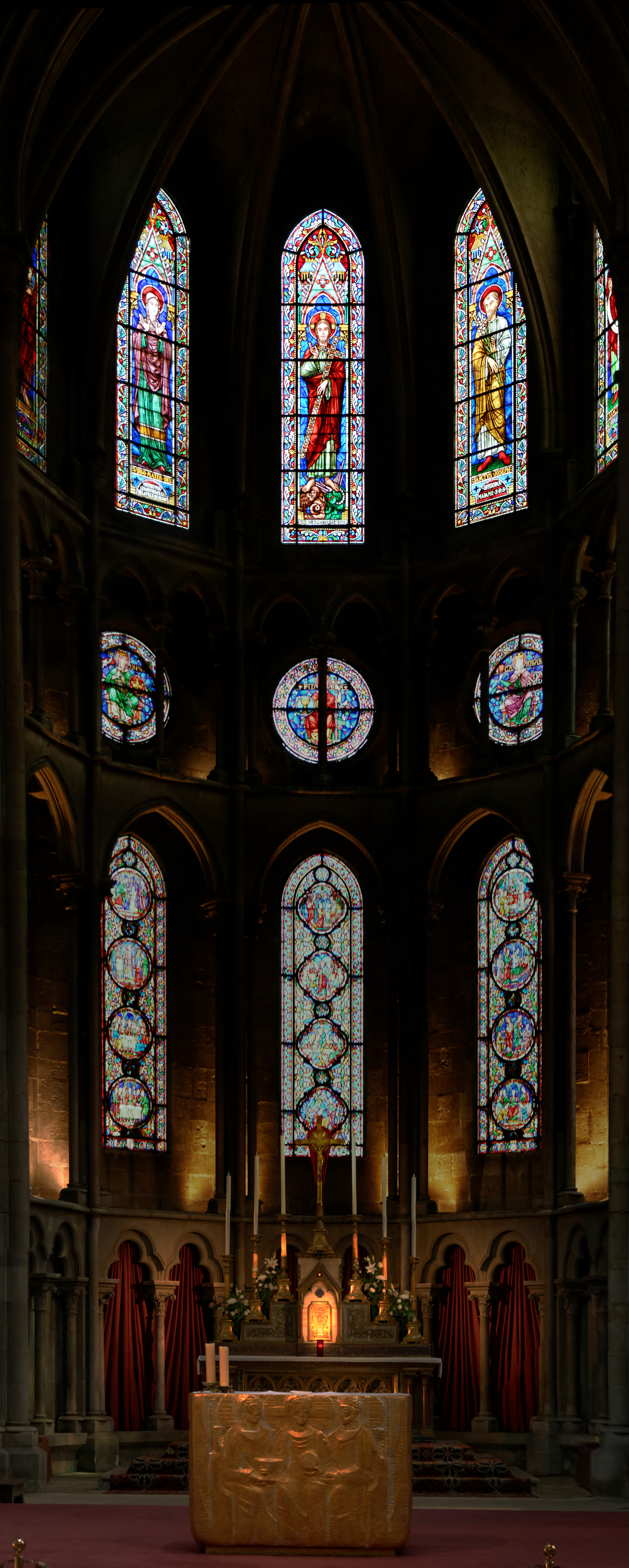
Apse

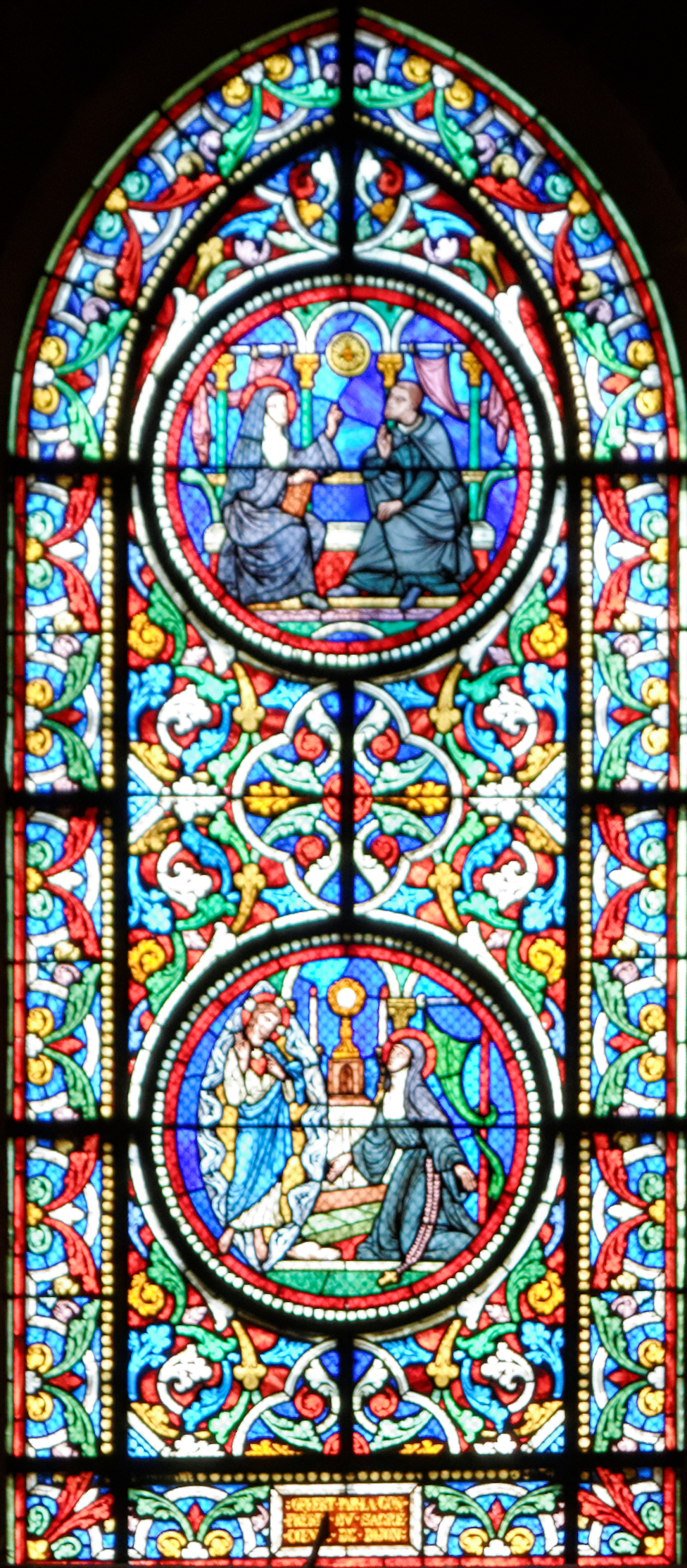
South side aisle, window 4

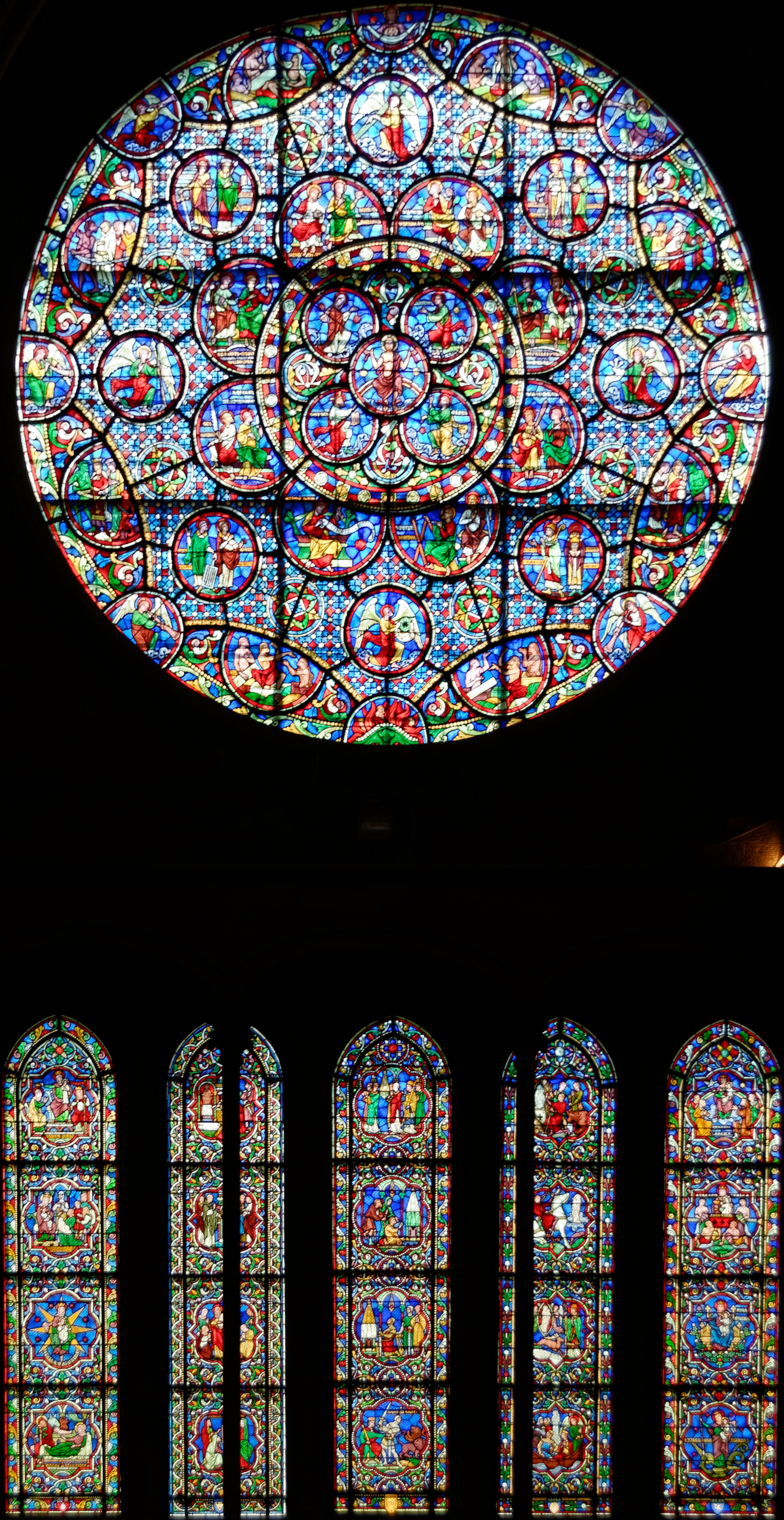
South transept

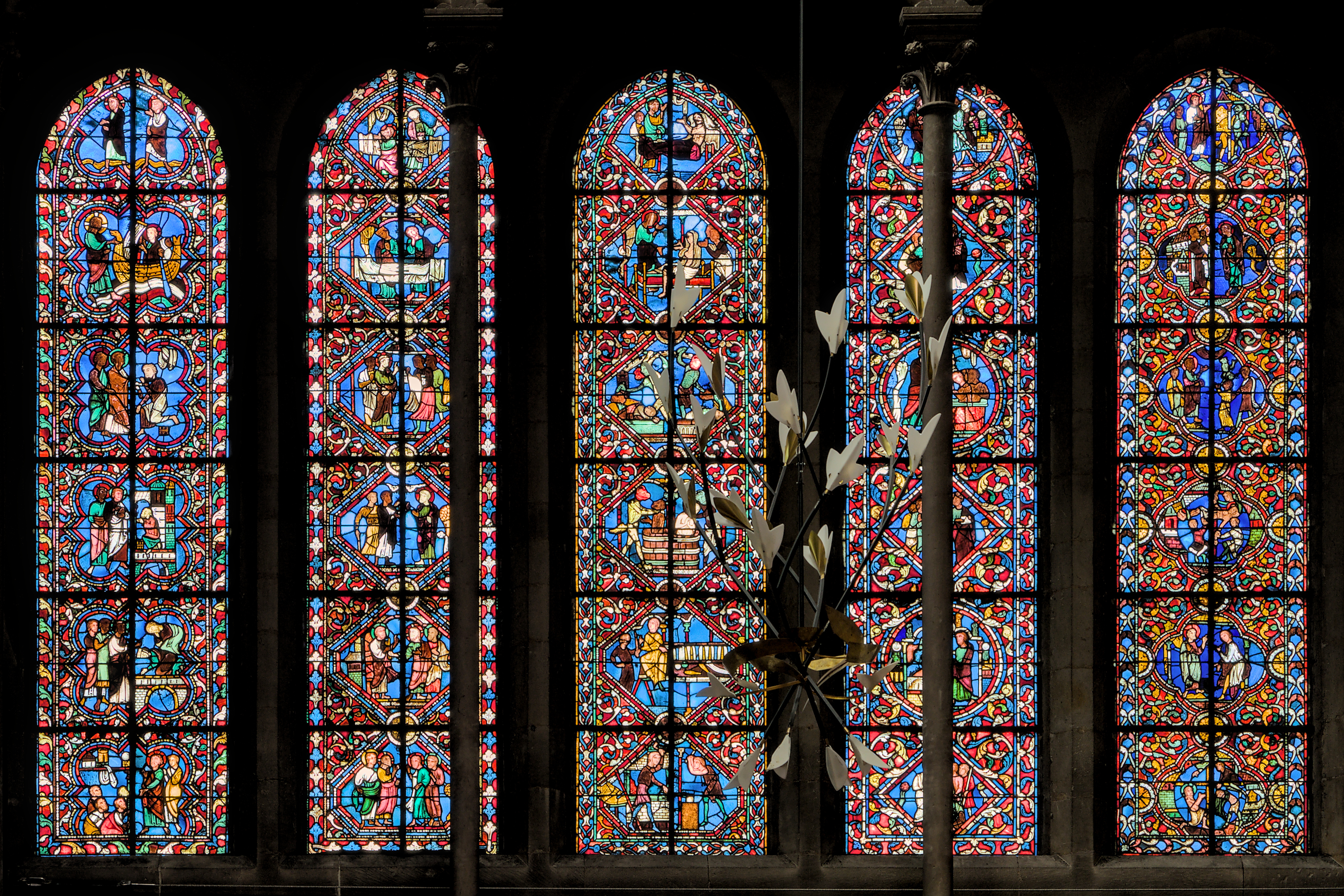
North lancet windows

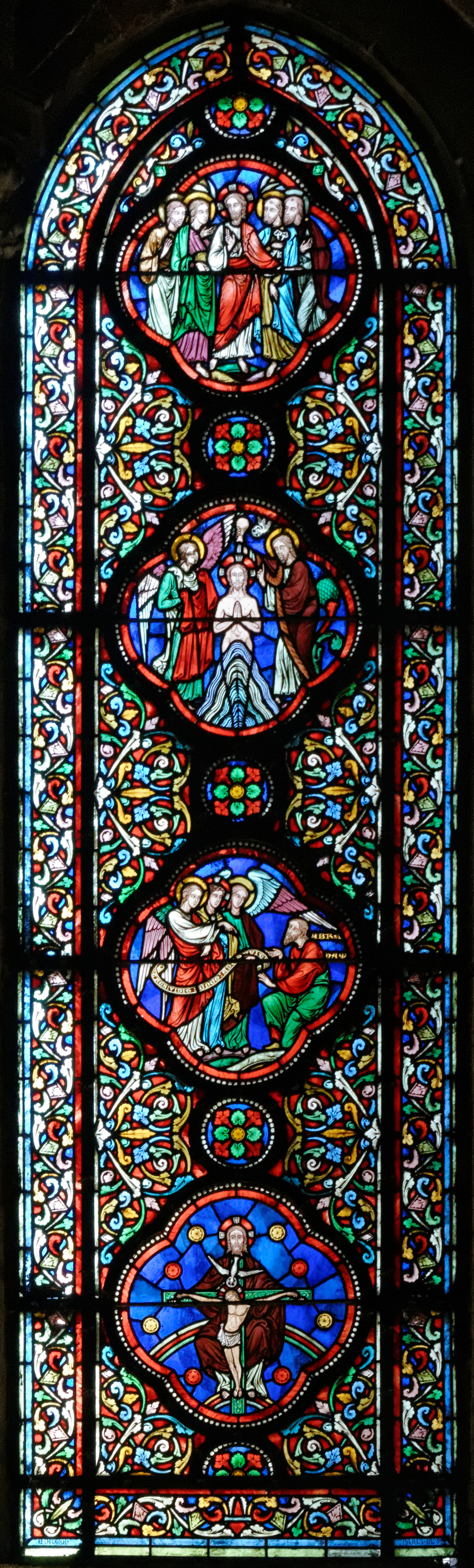
North apsidole, window 3

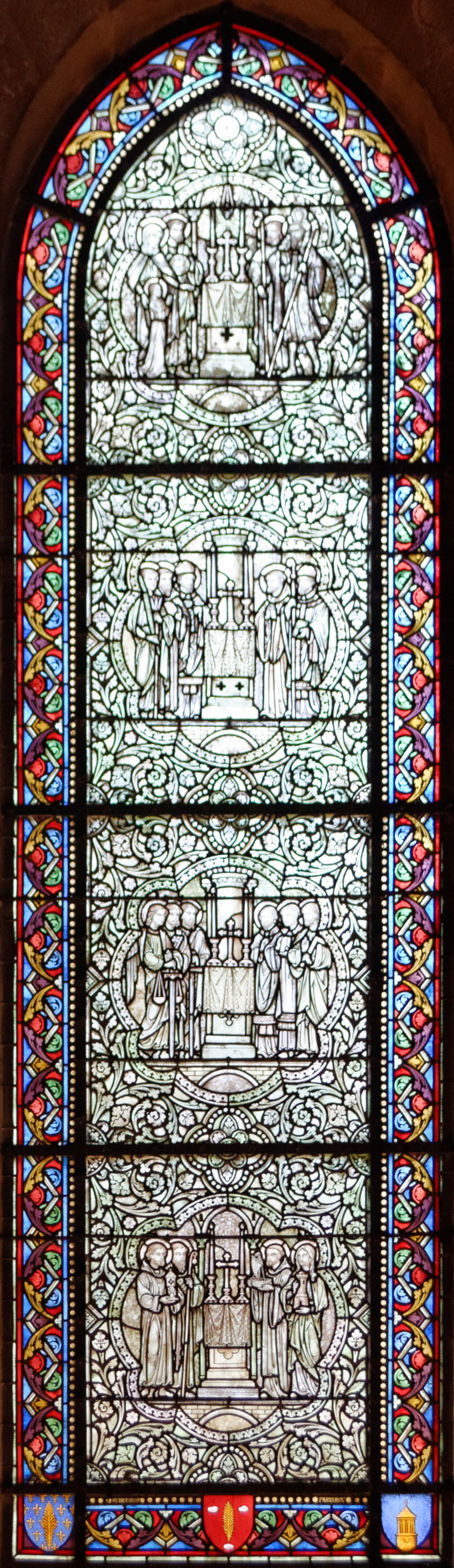
North transept, grisaille window

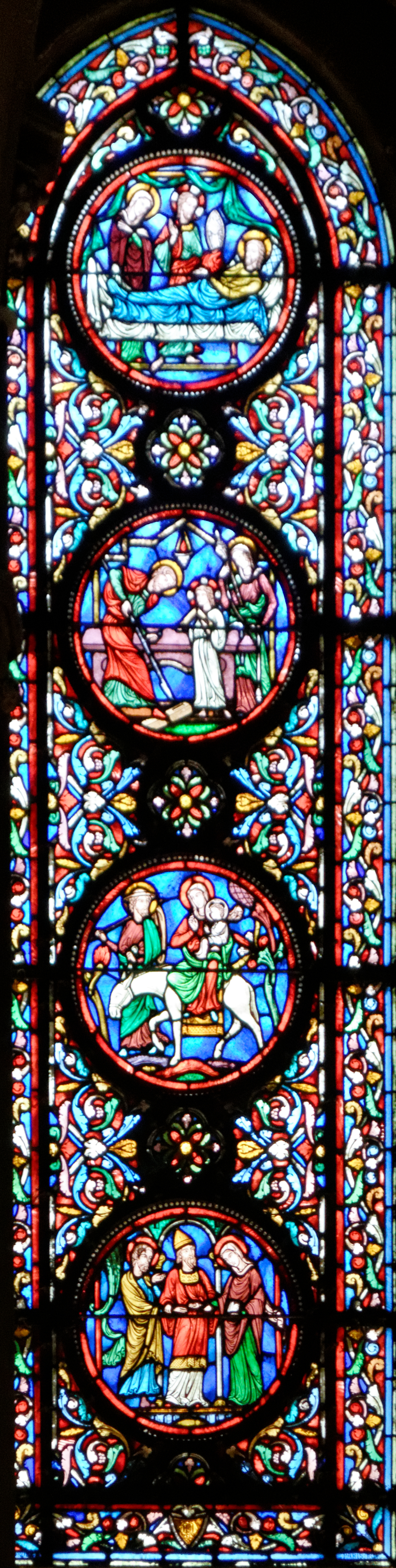
North apsidole, window 2

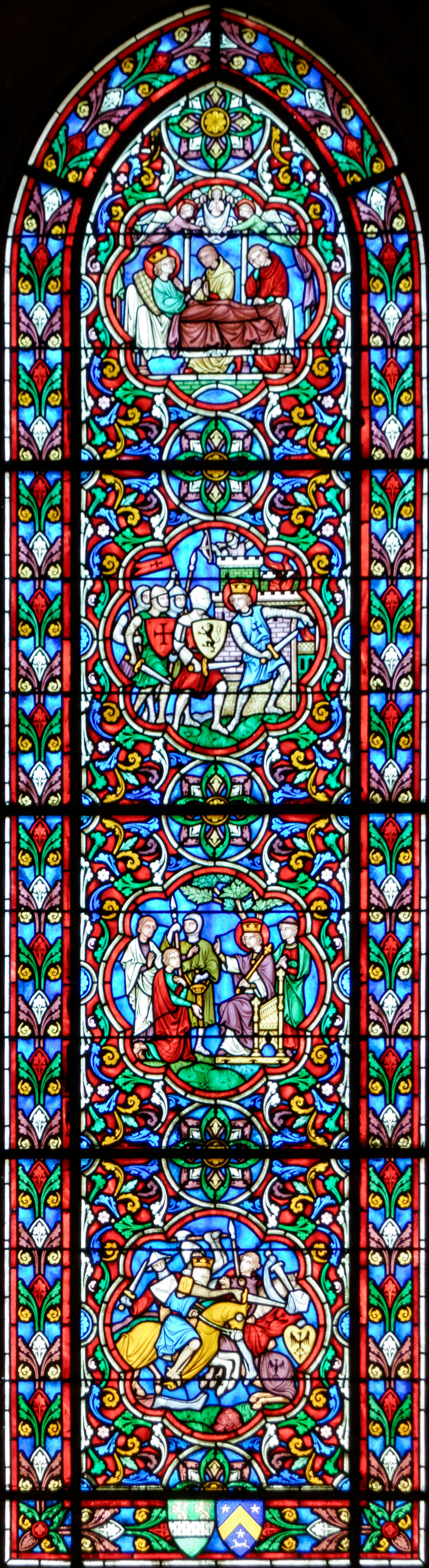
North side aisle, window 5

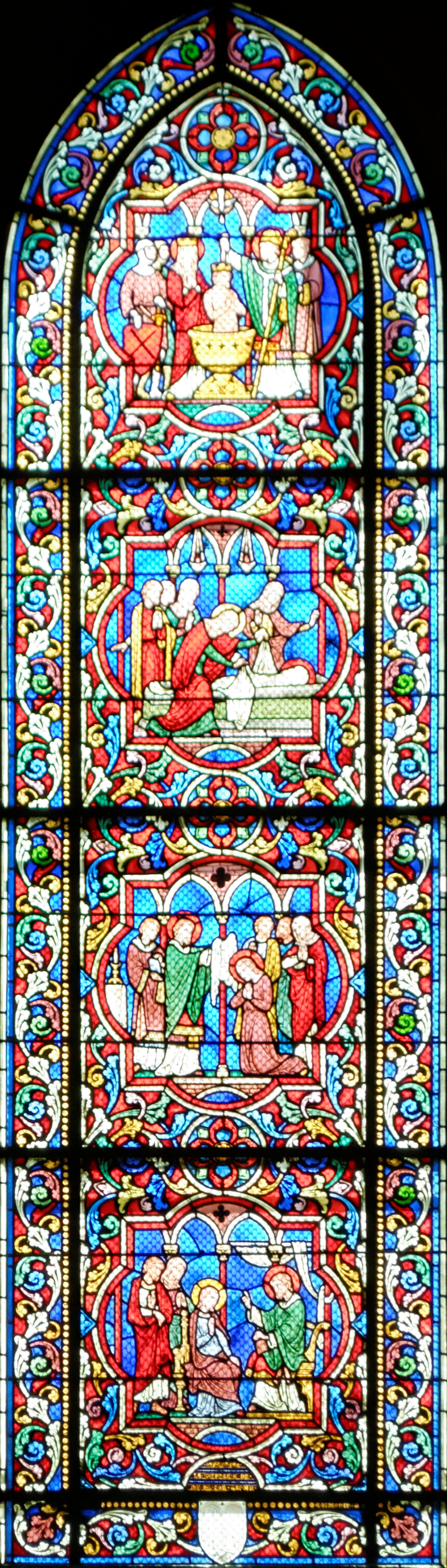
South side aisle, window 1

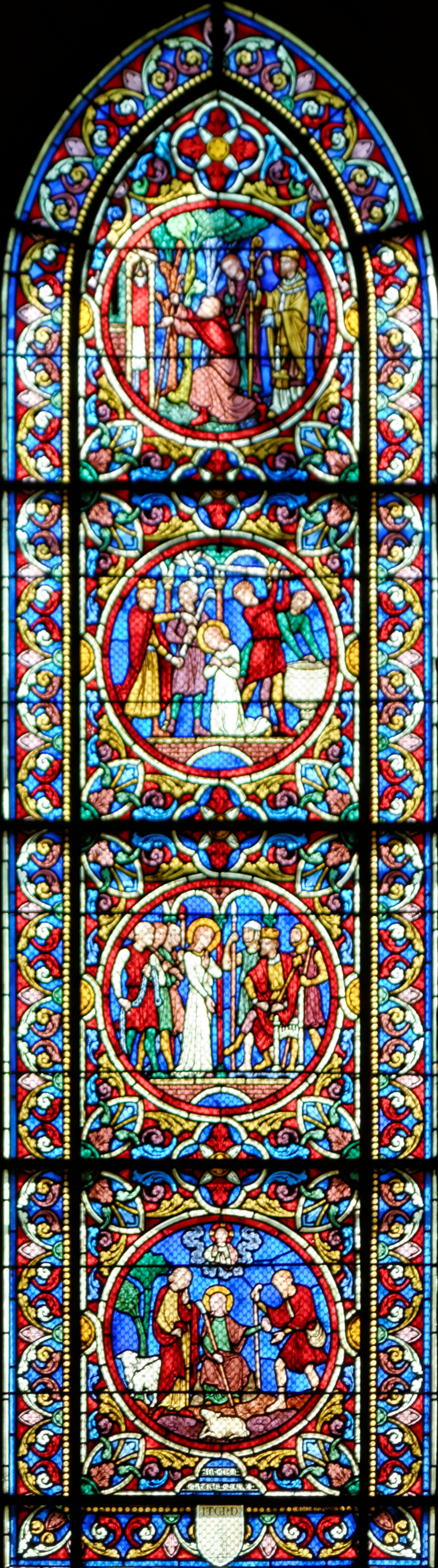
Southern side aisle, window 2

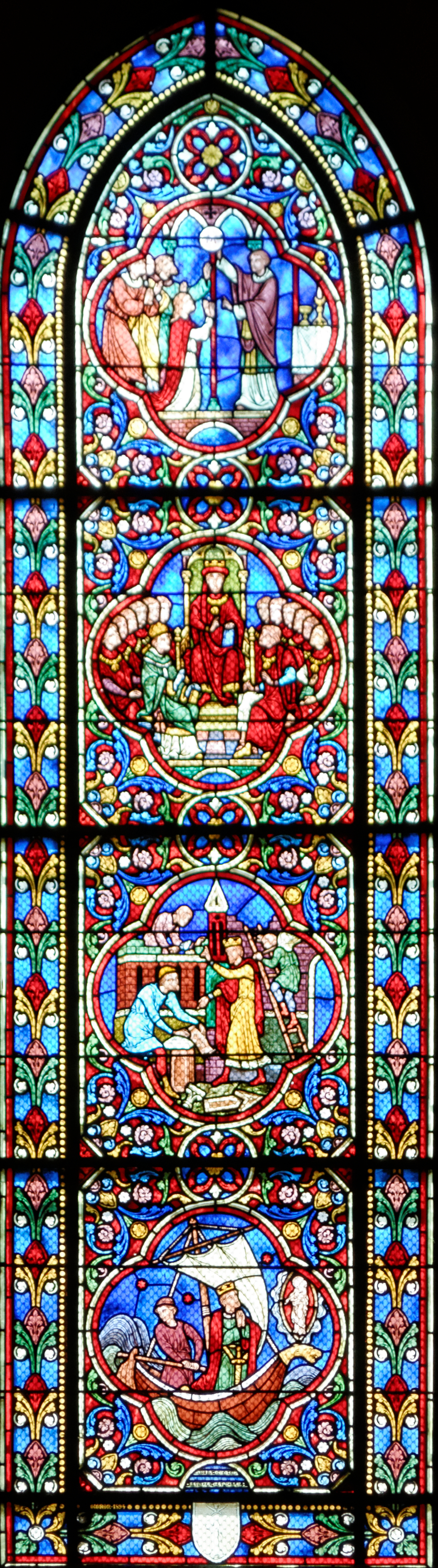
South side aisle, window 3

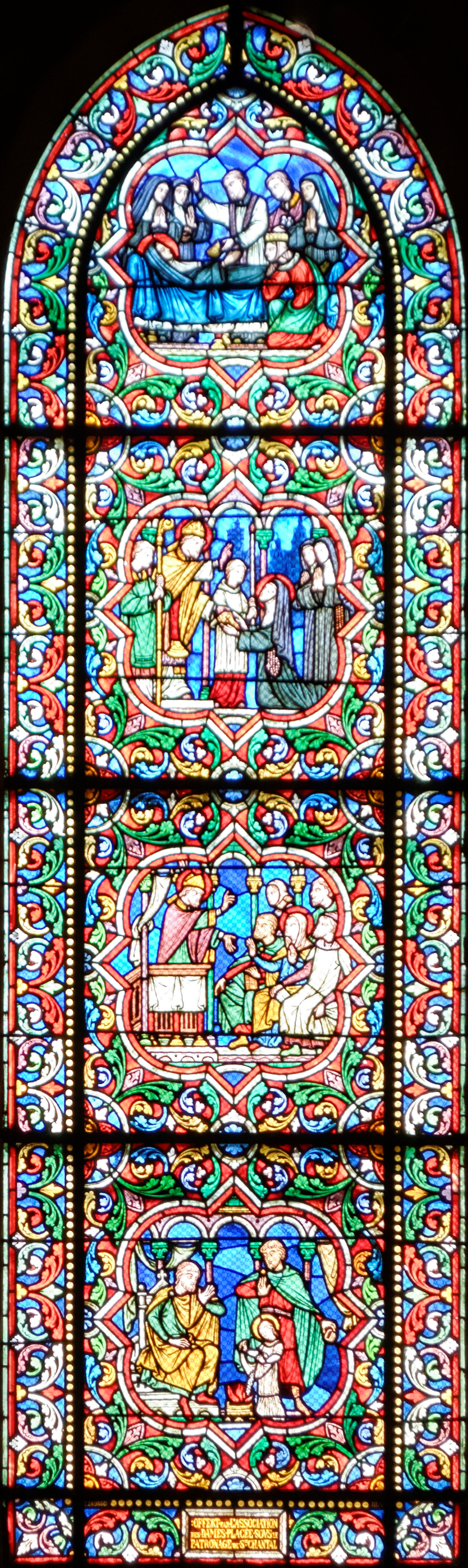
South side aisle, window 5

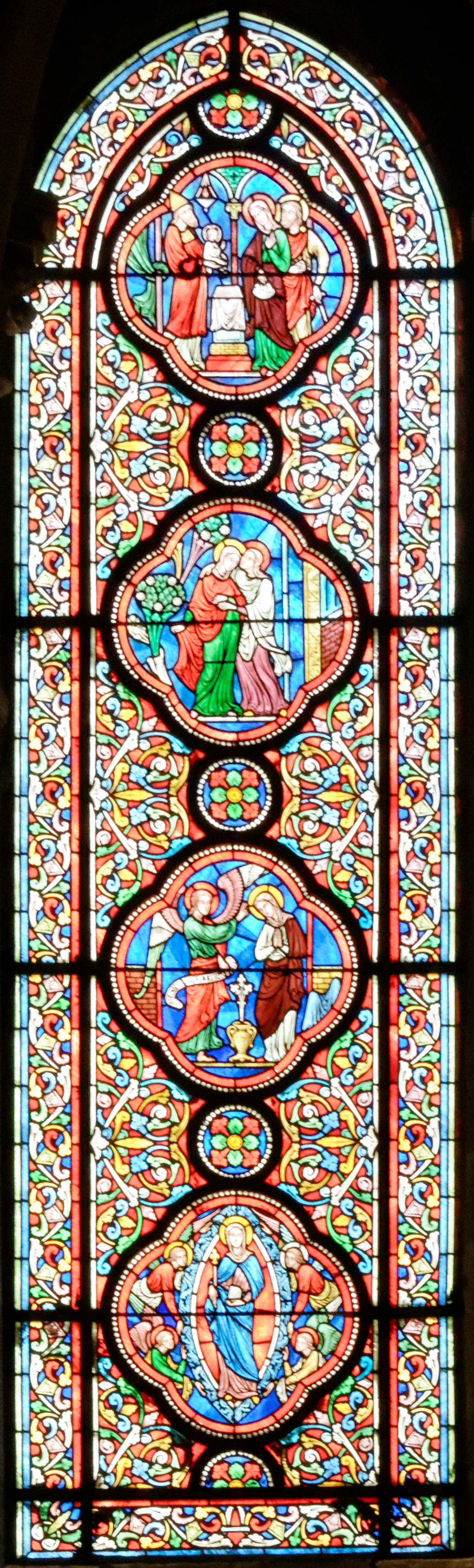
South apsidole, window 1

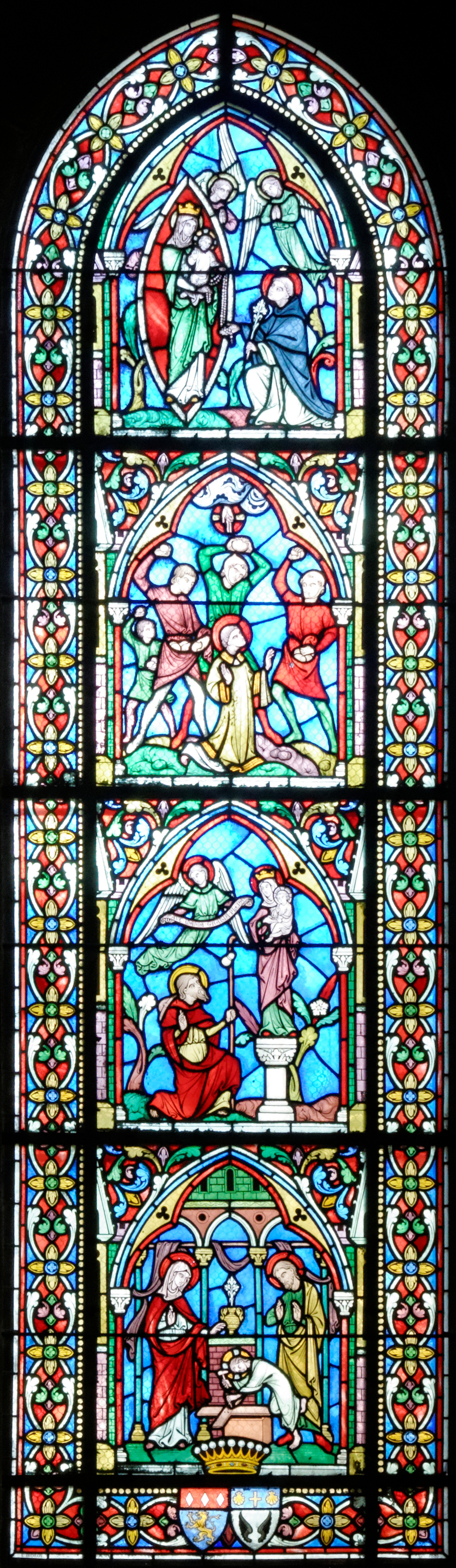
South transept, left-hand window

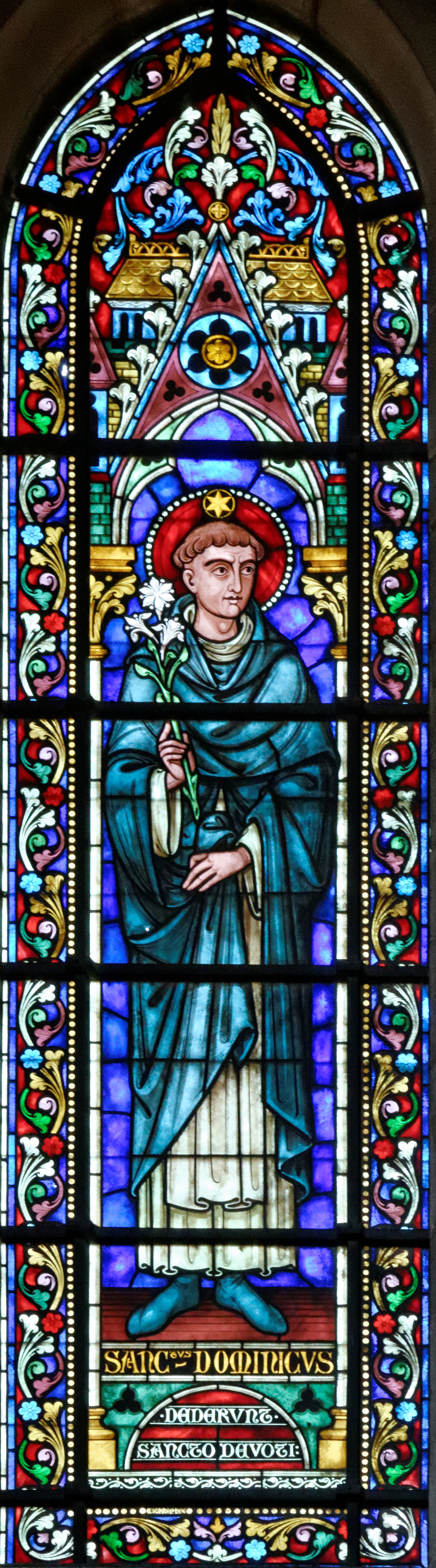
North transept, Saint Dominic

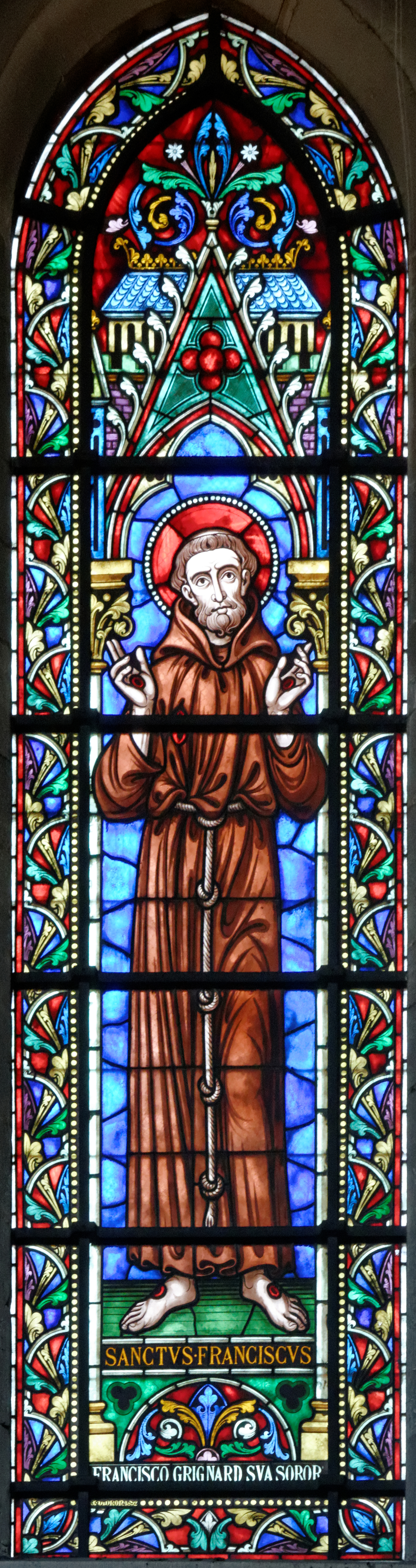
North transept, Saint Francis of Assisi
