= Jacquemart (bellstriker) =

Mechanical figure which strikes the hours

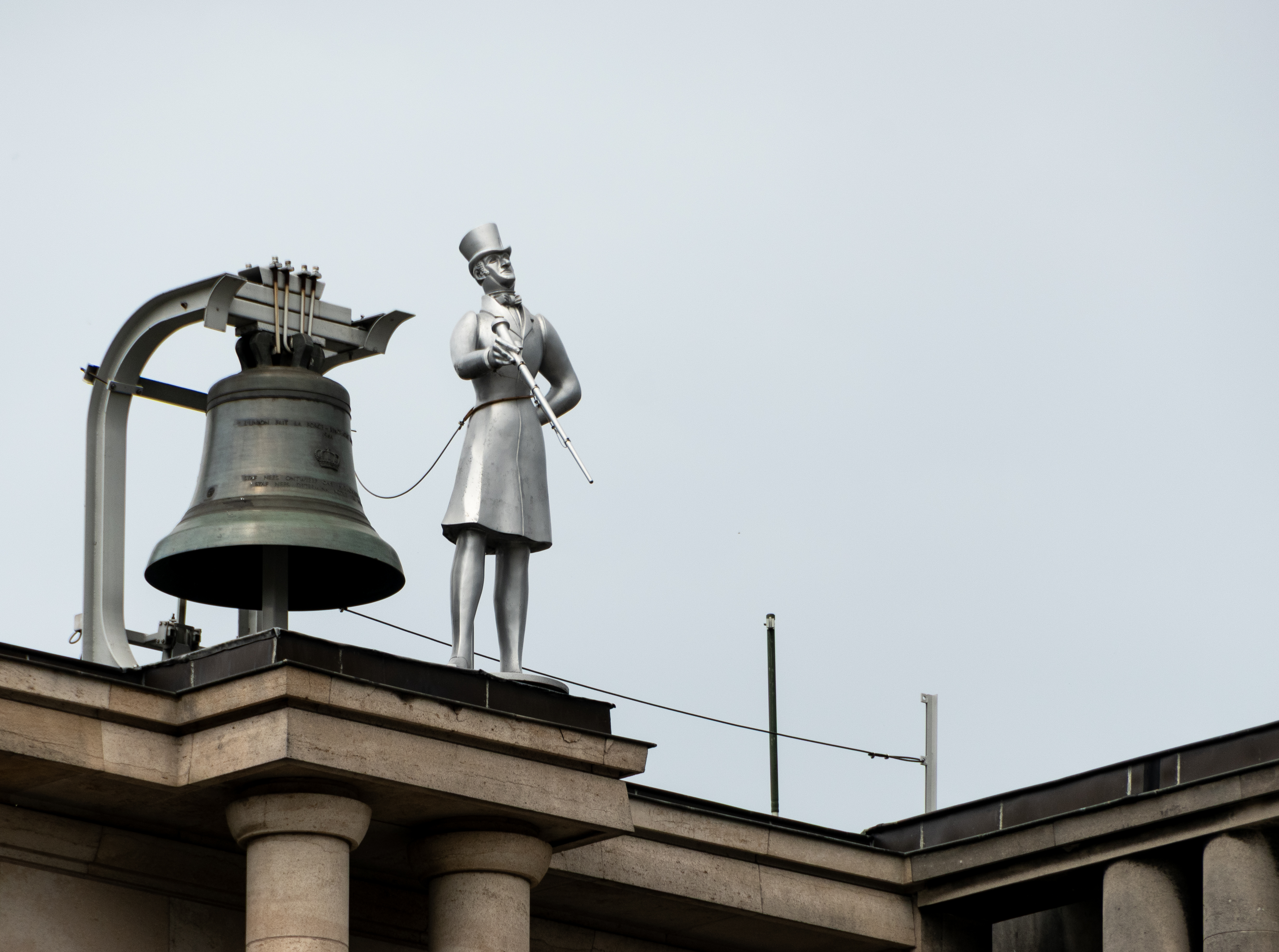
Jacquemart of the Mont des Arts carillon in Brussels, Belgium

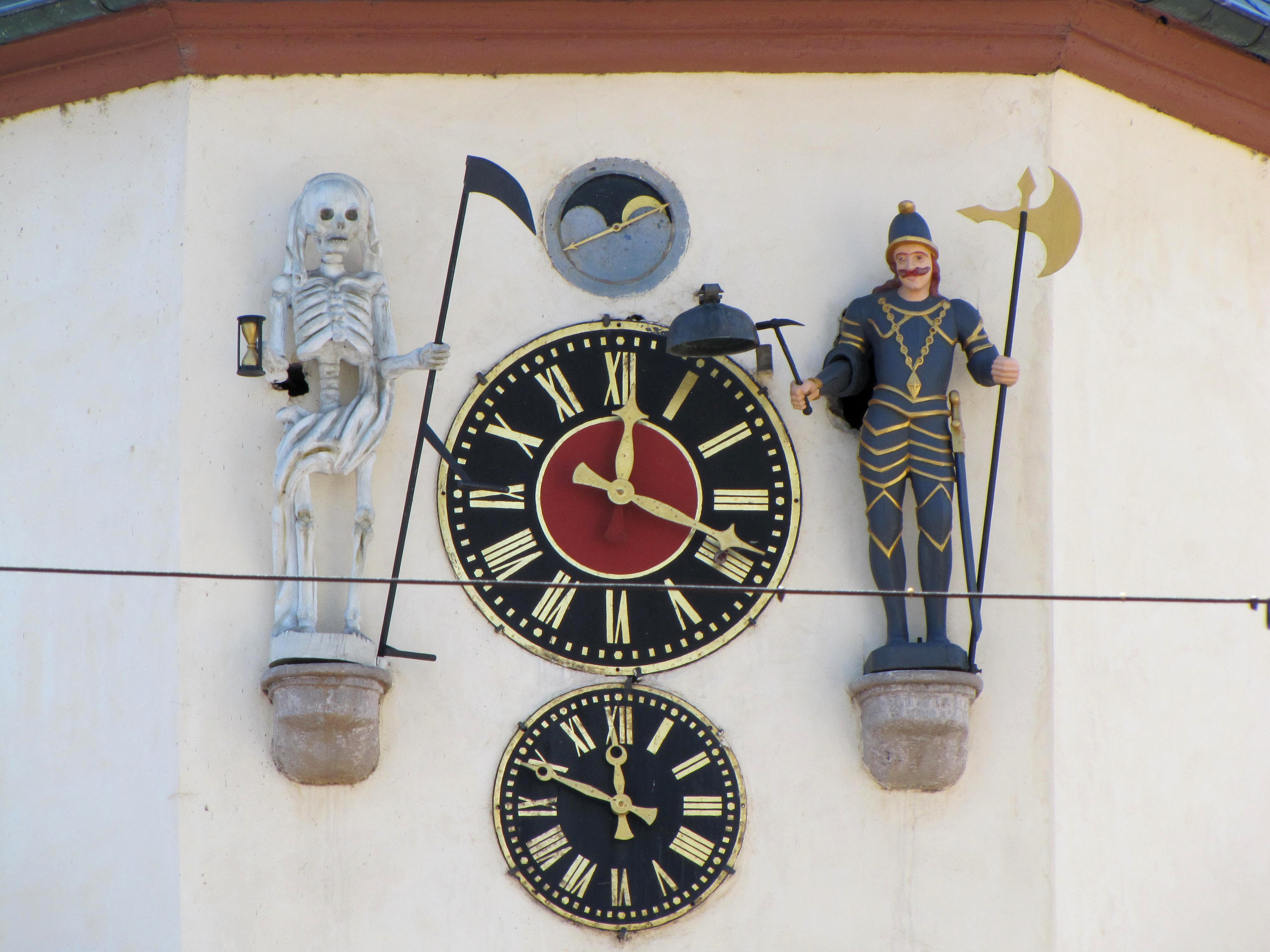
Jacquemart of the Hôtel de Ville of Benfeld, France

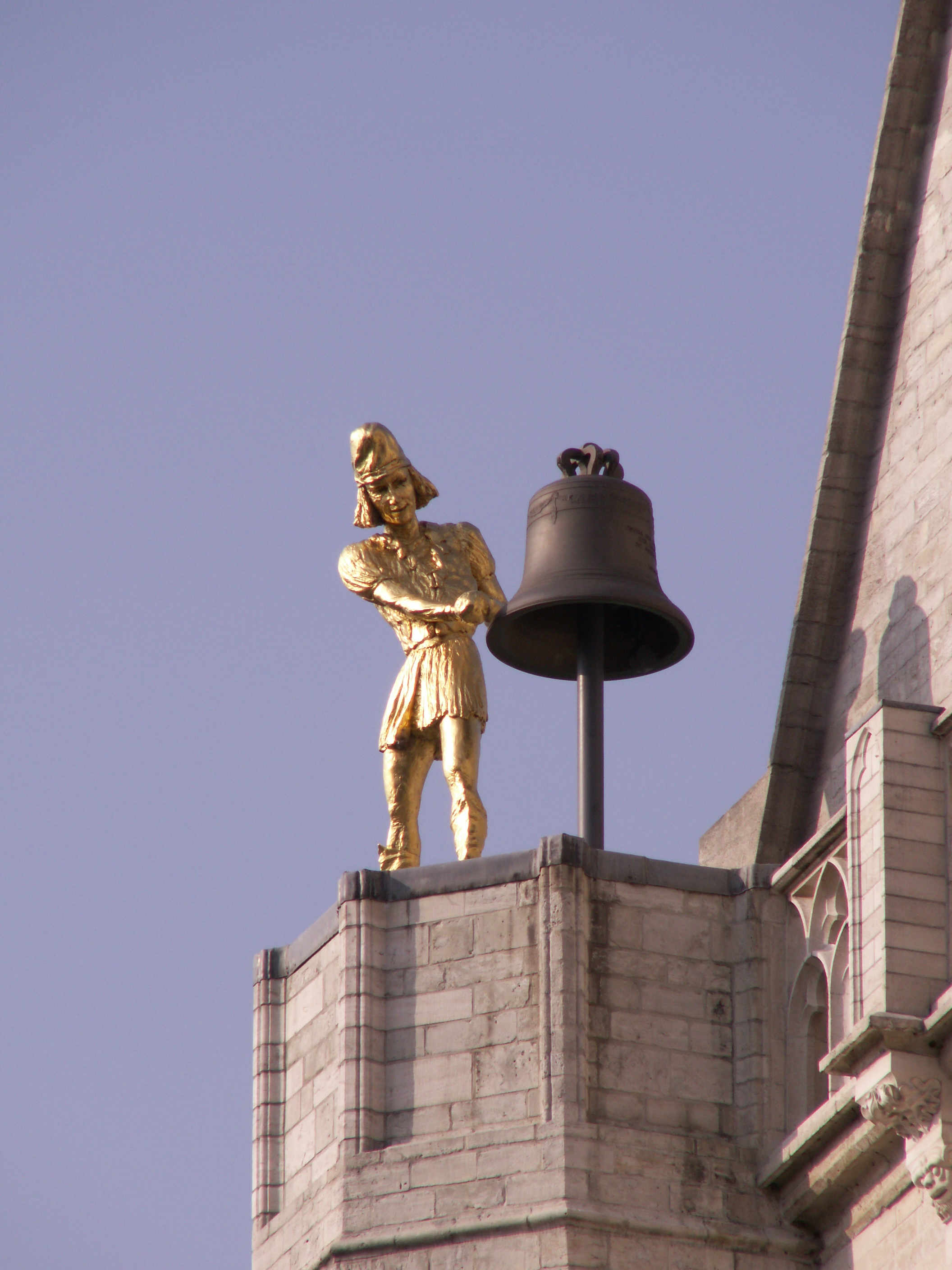
Jacquemart of St. Peter's Church in Leuven, Belgium

A jacquemart (sometimes jaquemart and also called a quarter-jack) is an automaton, an animated, mechanised figure of a person, usually made from wood or metal, which strikes the hours on a bell with a hammer. Jacquemarts are usually part of clocks or clocktowers, and are often near or at the top of the construction. The figurine is also known as Jack of the Clock or Jack o'Clock.

One of the oldest and best-known jacquemarts is found on the south tower of the cathedral Church of Notre Dame of Dijon: it was installed by Philippe II of Burgundy in 1383. Other well-known historic jacquemarts are found on top of the Zytglogge tower in Bern, Switzerland and the Moors on the Torre dell'Orlogio di San Marco in Venice, Italy.

The word is originally French but is sometimes used in English as well. The origin of the word is disputed, but one theory relates it to a tool called a 'jacke', used by the craftsmen building church towers, the steeplejacks.

In the South-West, the only existing one is that of Lavaur, located at the top of the bell tower of the Saint-Alain cathedral. Legend has it that during the wars of religion a Protestant prisoner was locked up in the bell tower and had to ring the bells every hour. He built a mechanism to do it for him.

== Notable Jacquemart figures ==
- Wimborne Minster Astronomical Clock, Dorset
- Norwich Cathedral astronomical clock, Norfolk
- The Potts of Leeds Ivanhoe Clock figures of 1878 by John Wormald Appleyard in Thornton's Arcade, Leeds, West Yorkshire, England.
- The coolie at Lau Pa Sat, Singapore
- St Mark's Clocktower, Venice
- Dubrovnik Bell Tower, Croatia
- Delacorte Clock, New York

== See also ==
- Automaton clock
