= Wimborne Minster astronomical clock =

14th-century astronomical clock in Wimborne Minster, England

Coordinates: 50.799021°N 1.988171°W

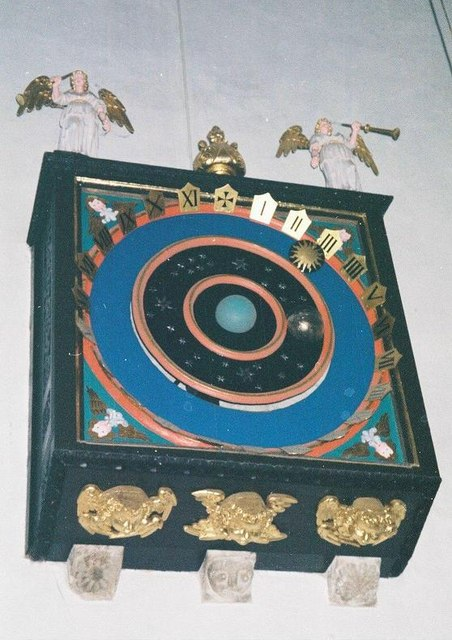
Wimborne Minster Astronomical Clock, with a blue-green image of the Earth at centre, and the Sun rotating in the outer lighter-blue ring, and the Moon in the inner starred ring

Wimborne Minster astronomical clock is a fourteenth-century astronomical clock in Wimborne Minster in Dorset, regarded as "one of the most ancient working clocks in Europe."

== History and description ==
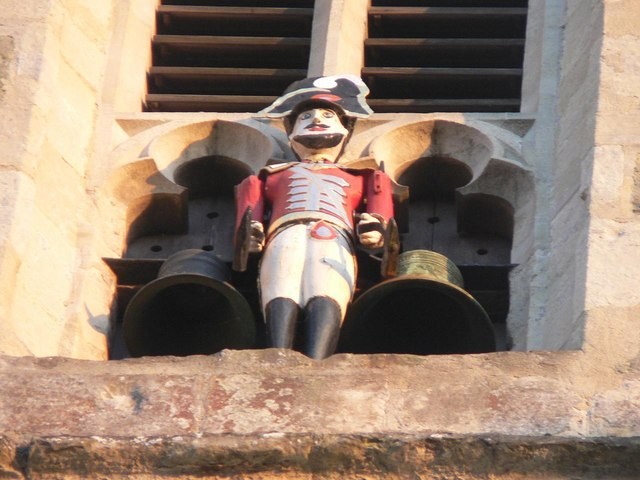
Wimborne Minster Quarterjack

The clock dates back to the early fourteenth century, possibly around 1320. It is suggested that it was built by Peter Lightfoot, a Glastonbury monk. The clock's case was built in the Elizabethan era, but the face and dial are of a much greater age; the first documents relating to the clock concern repairs carried out in 1409. In early church records the clock is referred to as the "oryall".

In 1593, the clock was removed from the central tower, and moved to its current location in the minster's west tower. The clock's mechanism was replaced in 1695 and the present works were installed in 1792. The gilded angels and cherubim which adorn the case were transplanted from the original organ case during church renovations undertaken in the Victorian era. In 1979 restorations were carried out upon the clock which reproduced the simple designs discovered under the ancient layers of paint.

The display on the clock is based upon the geocentric model, which was not superseded until the advent of heliocentrism in the late 16th century. The Earth is represented by a blue-green sphere positioned in the centre of the clock face. The Sun rotates in the outer blue ring and points to the hour of day. The gold/black orb in the inner starred ring represents the Moon, and shows the lunar phases. At full moon it is golden, and at new moon it is black. For intermediate phases it is partially black and gold in proportion to the phase.

The casing on the wall contains cogs which move the Sun and Moon models around the face of the clock. The movement is in the belfry. On the outside north wall of the minster is a full-size Grenadier, called the Quarterjack, which strikes the quarter hours. The original figure of a monk was replaced during the Napoleonic Wars.
