= Norwich Cathedral astronomical clock =

Historical clock in England

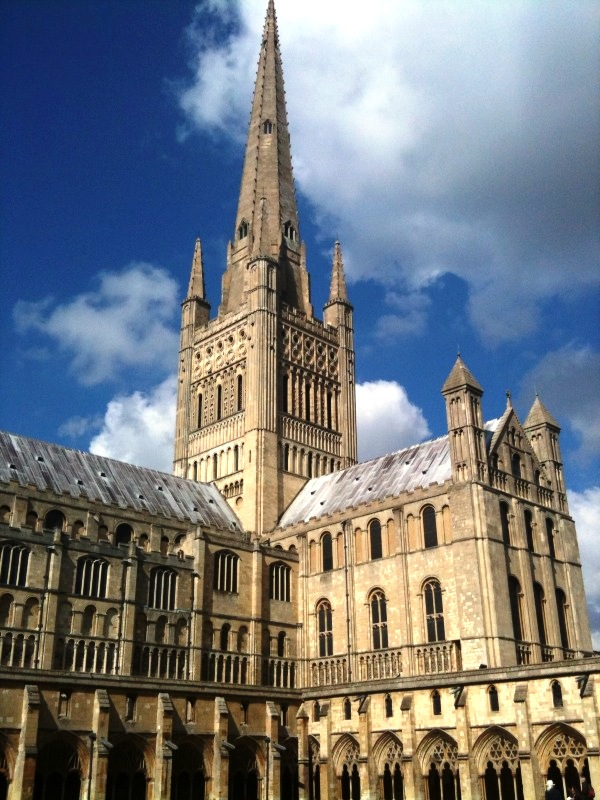
Norwich Cathedral (spire and south transept, with cloisters in the foreground)

The 14th-century Norwich Cathedral astronomical clock was the earliest example of a large clock with automata in England, and the first to possess an astronomical dial. It replaced an earlier 13th-century "old clock", one of the earliest weight-driven mechanical timekeepers made in England.

The astronomical clock at Norwich Cathedral was located in the priory's south transept. It was built to a high artistic standard—the exterior dial weighed 39 kilograms (86 lb) and the interior dial had a gilt moon and sun painted on the panel. There were images on the dial that may have represented the hours; 30 other images represented the days of the month. The clock's costs were recorded by the Benedictine monks in the priory's Sacrist’s Rolls from 1322 to 1325, which provide the earliest known detailed account of English clockmaking.

The clock was destroyed in a fire in the 17th century and was replaced in about 1620 by a simpler device, now lost, although two "jacquemarts" or clock-jacks have survived. The jacks were sold in around 1800, but were returned to the cathedral in 1878. They are located above the southern exit door, close to the original position of the astronomical clock.

== The original clock ==
The original clock at Norwich Cathedral was one of the earliest mechanical timekeepers made in medieval England. The reference to a payment for a mechanical clock at the priory, dated 1273, is the first to occur in England. A clock at Dunstable Priory was recorded in 1283, but the clock at Norwich (which was at time a Benedictine priory) was already being repaired by 1290. It was almost certainly weight-driven (as opposed to being a water clock), as the rope needed to be replaced. When repairs were done in 1322, it was referred to as "the old clock" (antiquum horologium).

The clock would have been expensive to build and maintain. It was unreliable enough for a new one to be commissioned, when in 1308 a visiting bishop complained and demanded that it be replaced.

== The astronomical clock ==
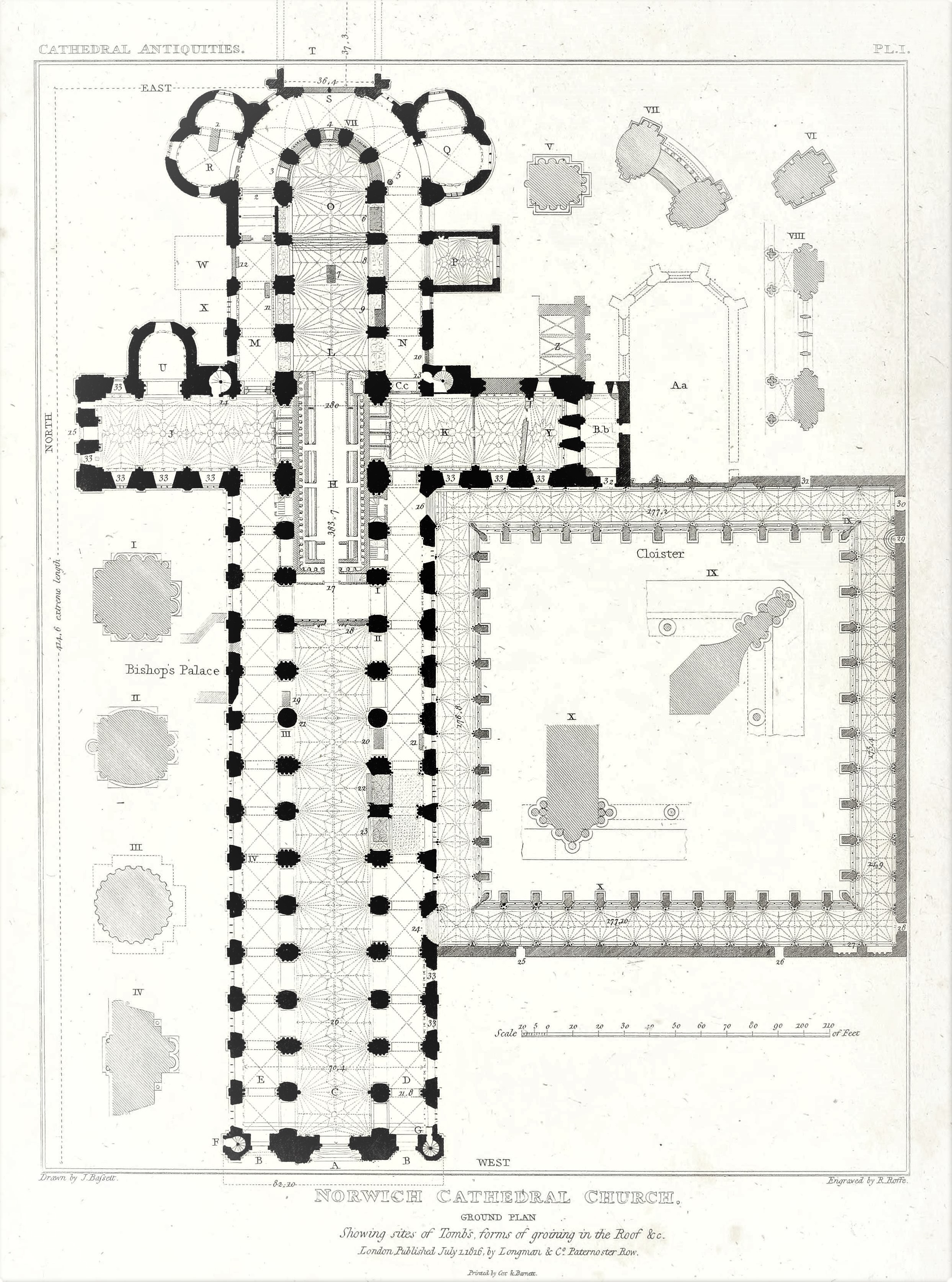
A 19th-century plan of Norwich Cathedral; the south transept is marked with the letters B and K.

Norwich’s great astronomical clock was built when William Kirby was prior. It is the earliest recorded example of a large clock designed to include automata, and the surviving records relating to its construction contain the earliest account known of the making of an astronomical dial. It was built into a wall across the south transept, and 200 pieces of Caen stone were used for the base.

The new clock was built to a high artistic standard. The exterior dial was made of an iron plate that weighed 39 kilograms (86 lb). There was a painted and gilt moon, a sun (gilt copper) and brass pointers on the interior dial, which was painted on a panel and located under the exterior one. The dial was completed after having been originally wrecked by the clockmaker Robert de Turri, who became insolvent as a result of his poor workmanship on the clock. Other men who were hired to complete the job in London ruined the material, and the dial plate was only completed to a satisfactory standard after the clockmaker Robert de Stoke rode to London to supervise its construction. The 24 small images known to have been on the dial possibly represented each of the 24 hours in a day; another 30 images represented the days of the month.

The clock’s costs were recorded in Sacrist's Rolls from 1322 to 1325; these provide the earliest known detailed account of clockmaking in England: (Note: A part of the Sacrist's Roll for 1324–1325 can be seen in Beeson, English Church Clocks, 1280–1850: History and Classification, p. 17. The manuscript (in Latin) relates to the construction of the astronomical clock.)

Clock – For one plate of metal bought, 4½d. Sounds purchased, 16d; for making five images, 20s. Item, boys making heads, 3s. In wages of Master Robert, 30s. Andrew and Roger, carpenters, are also mentioned as employed at this period. The total of the expenditure, between Michaelmas and Christmas, amounted to £4. 19s 8¼d.

In the Compotus for 1323, several entries occur under the head Orologium. Payments of wages to Andrew the carpenter, to Robert, to Roger de Stoke; with the following payment for the latter for carriage of his clothes and tools, 8s. For a hose of Latoun, 4s. 7½d. Also to Master Adam, the sculptor, for making twenty-four little images, 11s. Also for 200 Caen stones, 22s. Also to John, blacksmith, for ironwork for the clock, 3s. 9d, Also delivered to Robert of the Tower, for making of the great dial, 10s; and so much in danger of being lost, because from his poverty he was unable to perfect the work, nor was any thing to be obtained from him. Total, £6. 13s. 9¼.

— Modern translation of the Sacrist Rolls, Norwich, (1322–1323)

The clock cost £52 9s 6d to build, equivalent to about £24,000 in modern currency. It was expensive to maintain—in its second year £6 13s 9 1/2d (equivalent to about £3,000) was spent on it, which accounted for a third of the sacrist’s debts for that year. By 1324 large complex clocks were described as being common in English cathedrals.

== The 17th-century clock ==
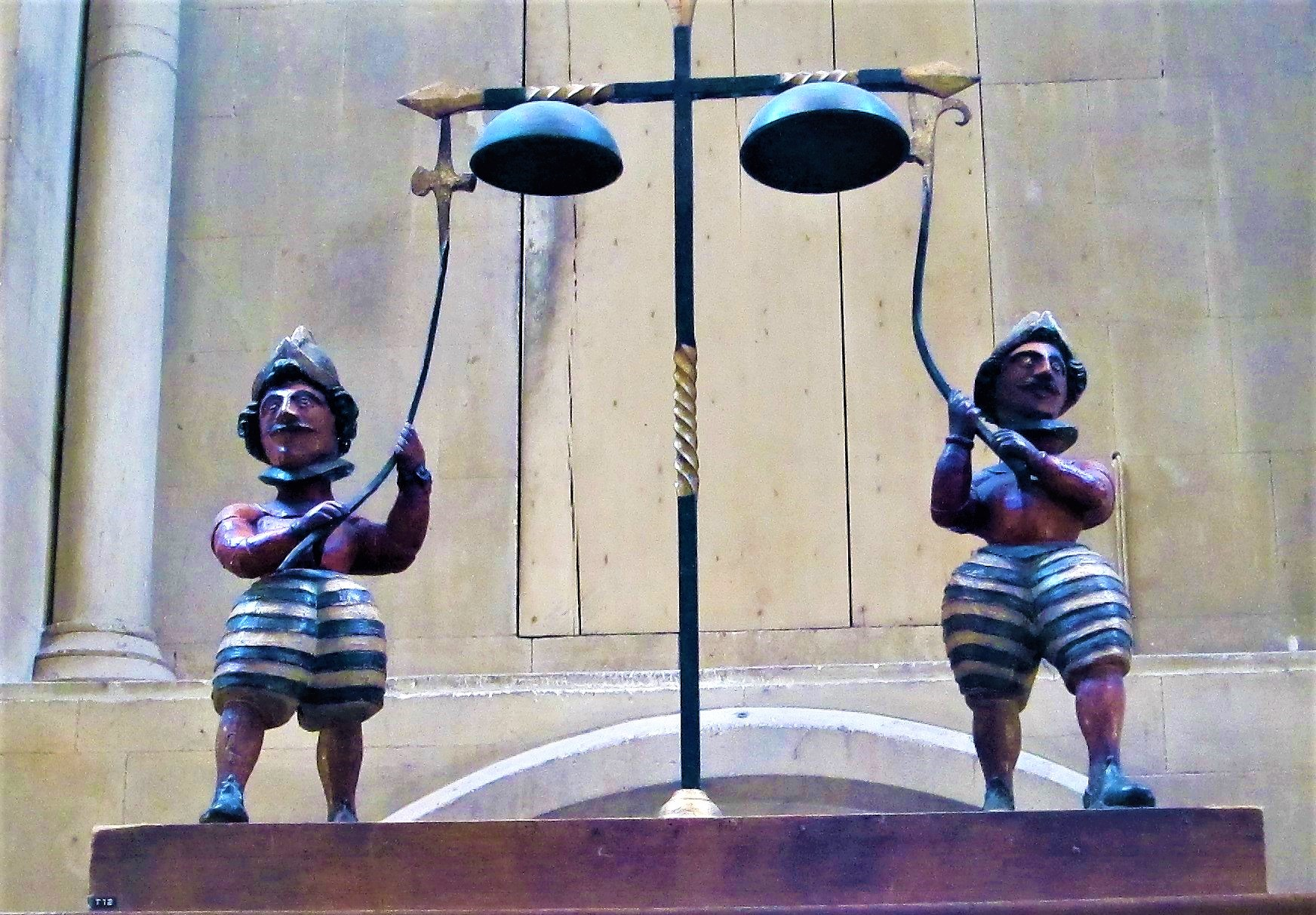
The 17th-century jacquemarts or clock-jacks still preserved in the cathedral

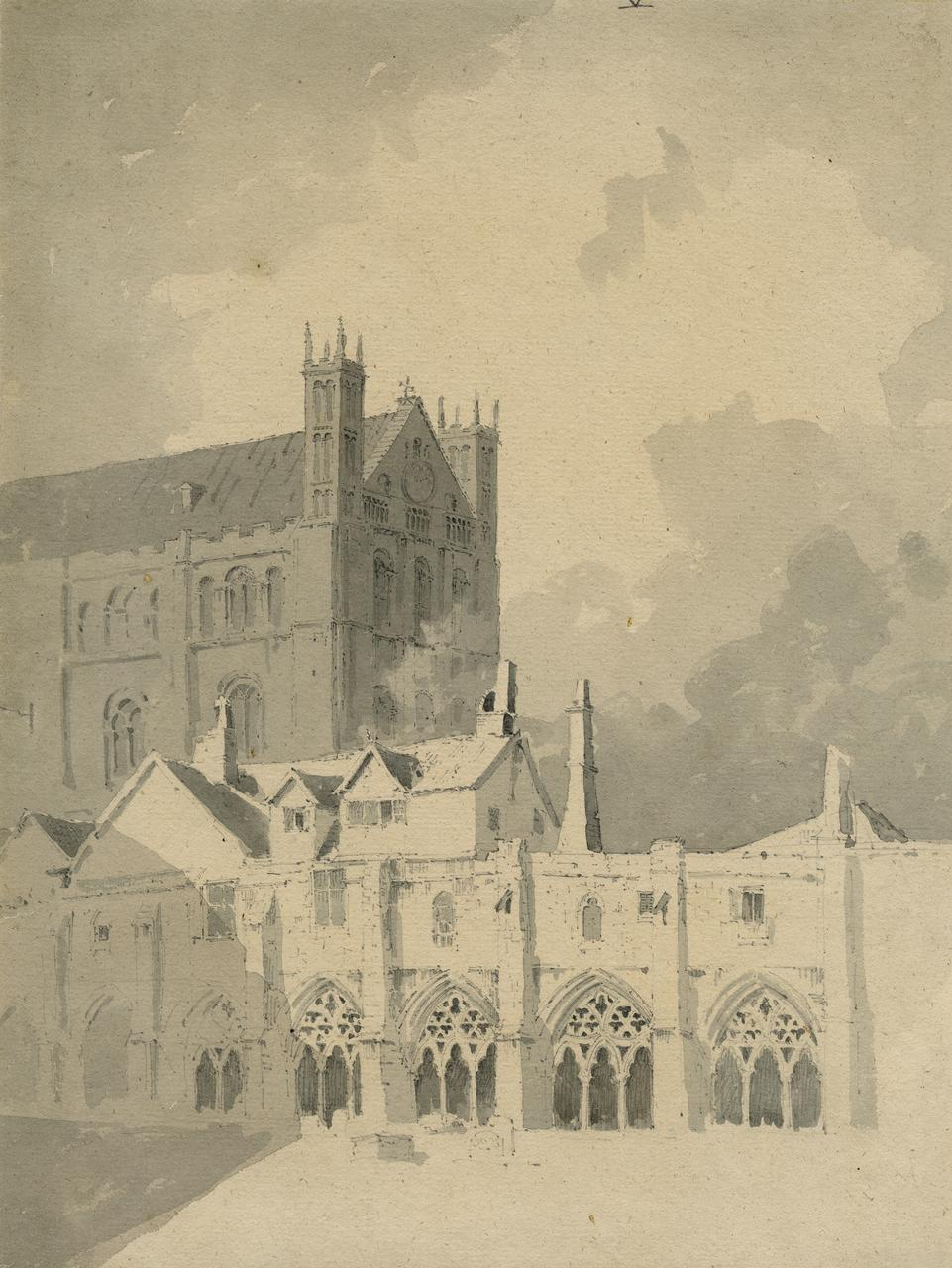
John Thirtle (before 1839), Norwich Cathedral, South Transept and Cloister, Norwich Museums Collections

The medieval clock was destroyed by fire in the 17th century, and was replaced by a simpler one in around 1620. A painting made in around 1630 (known to exist in Strangers' Hall, Norwich, in 1946) described the south transept as "the Ile where the clock standeth".

According to a 1917 article in the Journal of the Royal Musical Association, "this clock fell into disrepair, and was never restored." The only parts of the Jacobean clock to survive are two "jacquemarts" or clock-jacks. Built for use indoors, they are 51 centimetres (20 in) high, helmeted and in Jacobean era costume, with hammers to strike the bells. The jacks were removed after it was decided that "their curious movements" were too distracting during cathedral services. In around 1800 they came into the possession of a Mr Briggs, a former bell-ringer at the cathedral. Briggs travelled around the region and used the jacks when working as an entertainer, singing and putting on a ventriloquist act. He returned to Norwich when he retired in 1845, after which the jacks were sold. They were subsequently repaired.

In 1878 the jacks were donated to the cathedral. Once designed to move on a pivot, they were fixed on an oak stand with a Latin inscription below each one, along with a poem on card, accompanied by an English translation.

Horas significo cunctas quas Phoebe diebus,
Quas solet atque tua pallida nocte soror;
Nec magis errarem, rector mihi si foret idem,
Nos qui, et quaeque regit motibus astra suis
Tempora nam recte designo, si mihi doctus,
Custos assiduam conferat artis opem.

Phoebus, I tell all the hours and all is right,
As thou and thy pale sister, day and night,
Nor I no more than you, in aught should err
If he ruled me, who guides you and each star
For times I rightly tell, if of his art,
My learned helper will his help impart.

The present clock in the south transept dates from the early 19th century.

== Sources ==
- Atherton, Ian; Fernie, Eric; Harper-Bill, Christopher; Smith, Hassell, eds. (1996). Norwich Cathedral: Church, City and Diocese, 1096–1996. London: The Hambleton Press. ISBN 978-1-85285-134-7.
- Beeson, Cyril Frederik Cherrington (1971). English church clocks, 1280–1850: History and Classification. Phillimore. ISBN 978-0-901180-04-9.
- Gilchrist, Roberta (2005). Norwich Cathedral Close: The Evolution of the English Cathedral Landscape. Woodbridge, Suffolk: Boydell Press. ISBN 978-18438-3-173-0.
- Harrod, Henry (1857). Gleanings among the Castles and Convents of Norfolk. Norwich: C. Muskett. OCLC 942847068.
- Kerr, Julie (2009). Life in the Medieval Cloister. London; New York: Continuum. ISBN 978-18472-5-161-9.
- North, John (2007). God's Clockmaker: Richard of Wallingford and the Invention of Time. London: Bloomsbury Academic. ISBN 978-18528-5-571-0.
- Starmer, William Wooding (1917). "The Clock Jacks of England". Proceedings of the Musical Association. 44: 1–17. doi:10.1093/jrma/44.1.1. JSTOR 765764.
- Thurlow, A.G.G. (1946). "The Bells of Norwich Cathedral". Norfolk Archaeology. 29 (1): 89–96. doi:10.5284/1077844.
- Truitt, Elly Rachel (2017). Medieval Robots :Mechanism, Magic, Nature, and Art. Philadelphia: University of Pennsylvania Press. ISBN 978-08122-2-357-6.
- Wood, Edward J. (1866). Curiosities of Clocks and Watches from the Earliest Times. London: Richard Bentley. OCLC 1013260784.
