= University of South Florida =

Public university in Tampa, Florida, US

Coordinates: 28°3′16.42″N 82°24′47.01″W

- Motto: "Truth and Wisdom"
- Type: Public research university
- Established: December 18, 1956; 69 years ago
- Parent institution: State University System of Florida
- Accreditation: SACS
- Academic affiliations: AAU; ORAU; Sea grant; Space grant
- Endowment: $768 million (FY 2025)
- Budget: $2.80 billion (2025–2026)
- President: Moez Limayem
- Provost: Prasant Mohapatra
- Faculty: 2,301
- Students: 49,875 (2025–2026)
- Undergraduates: 37,517 (2025–2026)
- Postgraduates: 10,314 (2025–2026)
- Other students: 2,044 (2025–2026)
- Location: Tampa, Florida, United States
- Campus: Total: 1,646 acres (6.7 km^{2}) Tampa: 1,562 acres (6.3 km^{2}) St. Petersburg: 52 acres (0.2 km^{2}) Sarasota-Manatee: 32 acres (0.1 km^{2}); Large city
- Other campuses: St. Petersburg; Sarasota-Manatee
- Newspaper: The Oracle
- Colors: Green and gold
- Nickname: Bulls
- Sporting affiliations: NCAA Division I FBS – The American; SAISA; CUSA
- Mascot: Rocky D. Bull
- Website: www.usf.edu

University rankings

Global – Overall
- QS World: 654 (2026)
- THE World: 351–400 (2026)
- USNWR Global: 357 (2026)

The University of South Florida (USF) is a public research university with its main campus located in Tampa, Florida, United States, and another campus in St. Petersburg. USF did own a campus in Sarasota, however, a Florida budget deal transferred ownership of the campus from USF to New College of Florida on July 1, 2026. It is one of 12 members of the State University System of Florida. USF is home to 14 colleges, offering more than 245 undergraduate, graduate, specialist, and doctoral-level degree programs. USF is classified among "R1: Doctoral Universities – Very high research activity" and is accredited by the Commission on Colleges of the Southern Association of Colleges and Schools. USF is a member of the Association of American Universities (AAU) and is designated by the Florida Board of Governors as one of three Preeminent State Research Universities.

Founded in 1956, USF is the fourth largest university in Florida by enrollment, with 49,876 students from over 145 countries, all 50 states, all five U.S. territories, and the District of Columbia as of the 2022–2023 academic year.

In 2022, the university reported an annual budget of $2.31 billion and an annual economic impact of over $6 billion. According to the National Science Foundation, USF spent $568 million on research and development in 2019, ranking it 43rd in the nation and 25th among public universities. USF's $889 million endowment is the third-largest among Florida public universities and the largest of any American public university founded post-World War II.

In its 2018 ranking, the Intellectual Property Owners Association placed USF 1st in Florida, 7th in the United States, and 16th worldwide in the number of US patents granted. USF faculty, staff, students, and alumni collectively hold over 2,400 patents. USF is home to the National Academy of Inventors and the Florida Inventors Hall of Fame, both located in the USF Research Park in the southwest side of campus.

USF's sports teams are known as the South Florida Bulls and primarily compete in the American Conference of NCAA Division I. USF's 21 varsity teams have won a combined 6 national championships and 171 conference championships. Athletes representing the Bulls have won an additional 24 individual and relay national championships and 256 individual and relay conference championships.

== History ==
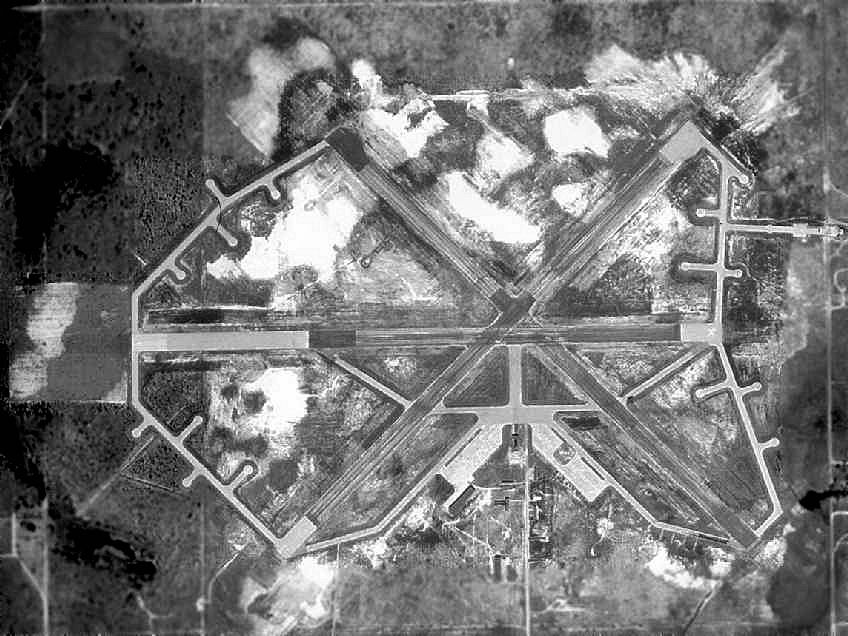
Hillsborough Army Airfield, also known as Henderson Airfield, on the site of what is now the University of South Florida

=== 1950s ===
USF was the first state university in Florida built during the 20th century. Former U.S. representative Samuel Gibbons was instrumental in the school's creation when he was a state representative. He is considered by many to be the "Father of USF".

Although founded in 1956, the university was not officially named until the following year, and classes did not begin until 1960. The university was built off Fowler Avenue on the former site of Henderson Air Field, a World War II airstrip. Before Henderson Field, the area was part of a 5,000-acre temple orange grove, the largest citrus grove in the world at the time, which gave the nearby city of Temple Terrace its name.

In 1957, the Florida Cabinet approved the name "University of South Florida". At the time, USF was the southernmost university in the state university system.

=== 1960s ===
The first five buildings on campus when the student opened were the old library (now the student services building), the science building (now the chemistry building), the teaching auditorium (no longer standing, on the site of what is now the music building), the university center (no longer standing, on the site of what is now the Marshall Student Center), and the administration building (now called the John and Grace Allen Administration building).

The university was founded as a school for whites only. It integrated and admitted its first African-American student, Ernest Boger, in 1961, the school's second year after opening. Boger graduated in 1964 with a B.A. in psychology.

In 1962, students voted to make the "Golden Brahman" the university's mascot, named after the state's cattle raising industry. In the early 1980s, the mascot evolved into the "Bulls".

In 1963, USF held its first graduation ceremony. 325 degrees were conferred.

The university grew rapidly under the leadership of John S. Allen, who served as its first president from 1956 until his retirement in 1971. During this time, the university expanded rapidly, due in part to the first master's degree programs commencing in 1964. Allen was infamously known for his opposition to college sports in favor of placing an "Accent on Learning", USF's original motto. He received national attention after declaring in 1959 that the school would have no sports teams, though he later had a change of heart and USF's first varsity teams would begin in 1965. Allen's ultimate legacy was to be the first person to build a modern state university from scratch, famously stating: "As a completely new and separate institution, the University of South Florida became the first new institution of its kind to be conceived, planned and built in the United States in the 20th century". Today the John and Grace Allen Administration Building, named after the university's founding president and his wife, houses vital Tampa campus departments including Student Affairs, the Admissions Welcome Center, and the Controller's Office.

USF's St. Petersburg campus opened in 1965 as a satellite campus. The site was known as the "Bay Campus" at the time and sat on the former site of the U.S. Navy Maritime Training Center.

USF's campus was damaged by an F4 tornado during the tornado outbreak of April 4–5, 1966, with the cooling towers at the university's power plant partially collapsing and the roof being ripped off of one of the dormitories. One person was seriously injured.

=== 1970s ===
In 1970, M. Cecil Mackey became the university's second president. During his time at USF, Mackey opened the university's medical school, School of Nursing, and first-ever Ph.D. program. Additionally, Mackey worked to strengthen the St. Petersburg campus, while opening new satellite campuses in Sarasota and Fort Myers. While serving as university president, Mackey continued to teach economics courses in a conference room across from his office. Mackey first coined a new descriptor for USF: a "metropolitan university". The term is still used to describe USF and other colleges in large cities today.

USF Sarasota–Manatee was founded in 1975 and shared a campus with New College of Florida, which later became part of the USF system as well before becoming an independent university again.

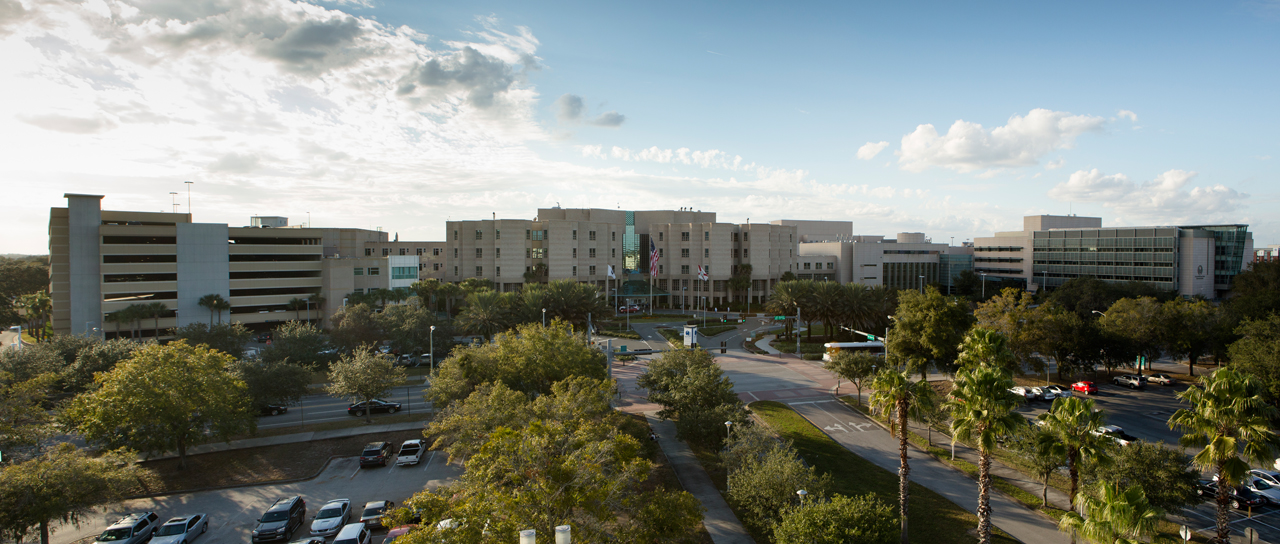
Moffitt Cancer Center on the USF campus

=== 1980s ===
USF emerged as a major research institution during the 1980s under the leadership of the university's third president John Lott Brown. During his tenure, the USF Graduate School was established in 1980. In 1986, Brown oversaw the opening of the H. Lee Moffitt Cancer Center and Research Institute on the USF Tampa campus. USF became the first university in the nation to offer a Ph.D. in applied anthropology and the first in the State University System of Florida to offer a degree program in women's studies. In January 1988, USF Lakeland opened.

On February 15, 1988, Francis T. Borkowski was inaugurated as the university's fourth president. He served as president for five years, laying the groundwork for the university's football program, establishing on-campus housing for the USF president at the Lifsey House, and merging several colleges into the College of Arts and Sciences.

=== 1990s ===
Betty Castor became the university's fifth president and first female president when she was inaugurated in January 1994. She served as USF president for six years until 1999. During this time, USF grew to be one of the largest universities in the nation in terms of enrollment. In 1997, the university began its inaugural season of NCAA football. The Florida Board of Regents named USF a "Research 1" University in 1998.

=== 2000s ===
Judy Genshaft was selected as the new president in 2000. Under Genshaft's leadership, the university emerged as a top research university (achieving "preeminence" per the Florida Board of Governors in June 2018) and major economic engine with an annual economic impact of $3.7 billion in the 2018–2019 fiscal year, her last year as president. In 2006, Castor returned to USF to lead the Dr. Kiran C. Patel Center for Global Solutions; she stepped down in 2009. The university expanded its global reach, opening the first Confucius Institute in Florida in 2008 and creating the Genshaft/Greenbaum Passport Scholarship Fund in 2011, which provides financial support to USF students who want to study abroad. Under Genshaft, USF has continuously been ranked among the top veteran-friendly universities in the country. In 2009, USF became the first university in the nation to partner with the United States Department of Veterans Affairs to offer specialized services for veterans taking advantage of the new G.I. Bill. USF continues to improve academically, being ranked among the best colleges in the nation by U.S. News & World Report.

=== 2010s ===
In 2012, USF was recognized as one of the nation's largest producers of Fulbright Program scholars. The university closed its Confucius Institute in 2018, citing falling enrollment, misalignment with the university's research focus, and possible consequences on US-government funding to USF. In 2018, Genshaft announced her retirement from position as president of USF.

The university's seventh president, Steven C. Currall, took office on July 1, 2019. During his tenure, the university broke into the top 50 best public colleges in the nation according to rankings by U.S. News & World Report, achieving a 44th-place ranking in 2019

=== 2020s ===
Currall led the university through the COVID-19 pandemic, which included budgetary hardships brought by a loss in state funding (including a controversial proposal to phase out the College of Education - later dropped due to fierce opposition). On July 19, 2021, Currall announced his retirement as president, citing "health and family reasons." He remained on the faculty of the Muma College of Business.

After Currall's resignation, Rhea Law, a USF alumna and former USF Board of Trustees chair, was appointed as interim president. The Board of Trustees selected Law for the permanent job as president on March 22, 2022, and she is the first USF graduate to serve in the role. Law stated her top priorities were for USF to reach a top-25 public university ranking, to gain admission into the Association of American Universities, and to build an on-campus football stadium. USF was accepted into the AAU in 2023.

In 2025, the university established the Bellini College of Artificial Intelligence, Cybersecurity, and Computing following a $40 million donation from Arnie and Lauren Bellini, the largest donation in USF's history. The Bellini College offers eight undergraduate and advanced degree programs, including master's and doctoral degrees.

In June 2026, USF became the first institution in Florida to launch an upgraded Secure Research Environment through a collaboration with Amazon Web Services, providing a compliance-enabled cloud computing environment to support Department of Defense-funded research. The infrastructure includes high-performance computing, digital engineering, and data analytics capabilities supporting USF's existing contracts with United States Special Operations Command and the Army Research Laboratory.

=== Seal and colors ===
In 1958, President John Allen commissioned a seal for the new university, wanting a symbol that would represent education on a global scale. USF's original colors were green, gold, and purple. These are also the colors of the Lambda Chi Alpha fraternity, of which President Allen was a member. Purple was later dropped and the official colors became just green and gold, but purple accents are visible on some of the older buildings on campus including the administration building which now bears the name of John Allen and his wife, Grace. Purple has since returned as a tertiary color for the university, though it has very limited use aside from some of the women's sports teams having purple accents featured on their alternate jerseys.

=== Preeminence ===
In 2018, USF was classified as the third Preeminent university in Florida by the state university system. For a public institution to achieve a status of preeminence, they must meet or surpass benchmarks in at least 11 of 12 metrics set forth by Florida lawmakers.

== Leadership ==
USF is a member institution of the State University System of Florida (SUSF), which is overseen by the Florida Board of Governors. Like all SUSF institutions, USF has a 13-member decision-making body called the Board of Trustees (BOT), consisting of the faculty senate president, student body president, six members appointed by the governor of Florida, and five members appointed by the Florida Board of Governors. The members appointed by the governor and Board of Governors must be confirmed by the Florida Senate and each serve five-year terms.

The BOT has many responsibilities, including setting the school's budget, strategic goals and objectives, and establishing policies related to academic programs. The USF BOT also appoints the USF president, who also serves as the chancellor of the Tampa campus and in turn appoints the chancellors of the St. Petersburg and Sarasota-Manatee campuses.

USF is currently led by Rhea Law, who was appointed as interim president following the retirement of Steven C. Currall in August 2021, then selected for the permanent role in March 2022. The chancellor of the St. Petersburg campus is Christian Hardigree and the chancellor of the Sarasota-Manatee campus is Karen Holbrook.

Presidents
Person	Position	Tenure
John S. Allen	President	1957–1970
Harris Dean	Interim President	1970–1971
M. Cecil Mackey	President	1971–1976
W. Reece Smith, Jr.	Interim President	1976–1977
Carl Riggs	Interim President	1977–1978
John Lott Brown	President	1978–1988
Francis Borkowski	President	1988–1993
Robert A. Bryan	Interim President	1993–1994
Betty Castor	President	1994–1999
Thomas Tighe	Acting President	Fall 1999
Richard Peck	Interim President	1999–2000
Judy Genshaft	President	2000–2019
Steven C. Currall	President	2019–2021
Rhea Law	Interim President	2021–2022
Rhea Law	President	2022–2026
Moez Limayem	President	2026–present

== Campuses ==
=== University of South Florida System (1965–2020) ===
USF was previously identified as a university system from 1965 until 2020, but is now chartered as one university geographically distributed across three campus locations: Tampa, St. Petersburg and Sarasota-Manatee. Before being consolidated into one university geographically distributed, the University of South Florida System included three member institutions: USF Tampa (which was the flagship campus), USF St. Petersburg, and USF Sarasota-Manatee. Each institution was separately accredited, had a distinct mission, and its own strategic plans. The USF System once included three other member institutions: one in Fort Myers, one in Lakeland, and a second Sarasota campus.

USF Fort Myers opened in 1982 and closed in 1997 with the opening of Florida Gulf Coast University.

The Sarasota institution was originally a private college called New College which sold itself to USF in 1975 to pay off debt, and became New College of the University of South Florida. As part of the deal, New College was allowed to keep its unique grading system. It shared a campus with USF Sarasota-Manatee, which opened in 1975, but was accredited differently as USFSM was considered a branch campus rather than a member institution at the time. New College became the independent New College of Florida in 2001, but continued to share a campus with USFSM until a new one was built for USFSM in 2006.

USF Lakeland opened in 1988 and split off from the USF System in 2012 to become the independent Florida Polytechnic University.

In summer 2020, the system was consolidated into "one university geographically distributed"

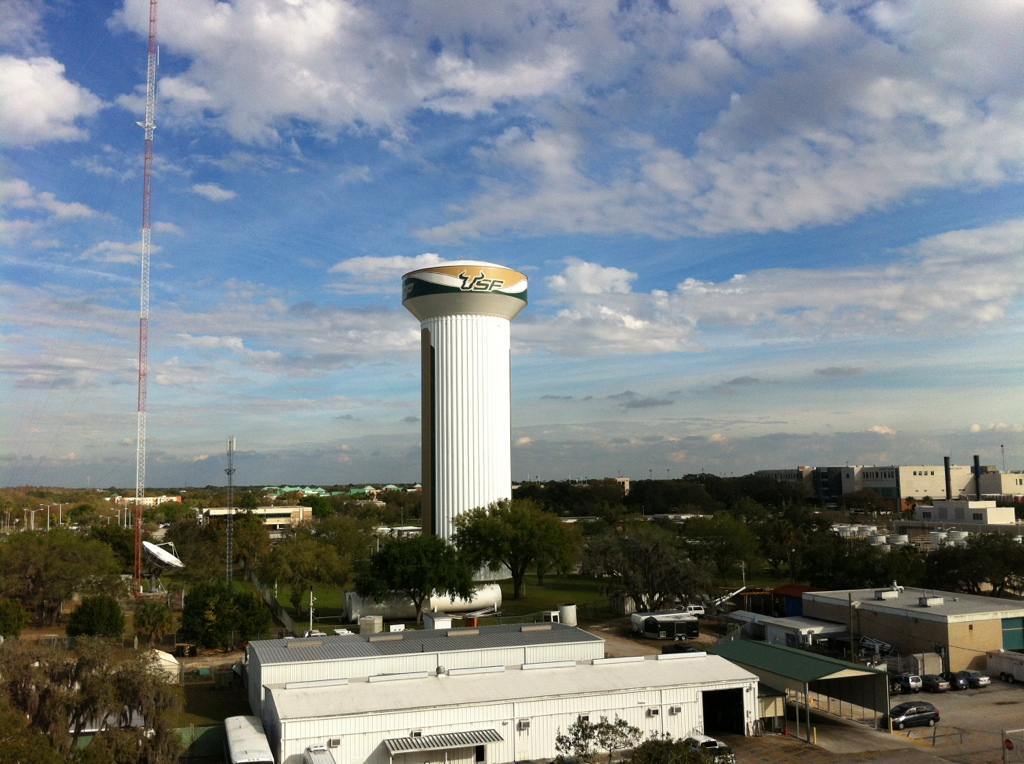
The 212-foot tall water tower is one of the tallest structures on USF's Tampa campus

=== Tampa campus ===
Established in 1956, the USF Tampa campus serves more than 41,000 students. The institution houses 14 colleges and is the doctoral granting campus of USF. The University of South Florida Office of Graduate Studies is based on the Tampa campus and serves as the center of leadership for graduate education at the University of South Florida.

The Tampa campus is located in North Tampa east of the University neighborhood, about seven miles north of downtown. It is by far the largest of the three campuses, spanning 1,562 acres. The campus is divided into different districts, with most housing located in the northeast, athletics and recreation in the east and southeast, research in the south and southwest, USF Health in the west, northwest and north, and undergraduate classes and student services in central campus. Each college is divided into its own section within the district, for example with fine and performing arts in the north and northwest parts of the district, social sciences in the east, natural sciences and engineering in the south, and education and business in the southeast.

The campus is known for having over 19,000 trees, and has been named a Tree Campus USA by the Arbor Day Foundation every year since 2011. In honor of this, nearly all streets on campus are named after trees, as are six of the 14 dorms. The tree motif is also seen on USF's ceremonial mace, which has a gold pinecone on the top to symbolize both growth and the fact that the first trees to be planted on the campus were pine. These pine trees are still around today, in the field next to the main south entrance to the campus on LeRoy Collins Boulevard between Fowler Avenue and Alumni Drive.

=== St. Petersburg campus ===
USF first occupied the site of the USF St. Petersburg campus in 1965, taking over the former U.S. Maritime Training Center along Bayboro Harbor in downtown St. Petersburg. It is located next to Albert Whitted Airport and less than a mile from the Salvador Dalí Museum and Al Lang Stadium. USFSP was a satellite campus from 1965 until 2006, when it was accredited as a separate entity from the USF Tampa campus within the University of South Florida System by the Southern Association of Colleges and Schools. USFSP serves approximately 4,500 students per year and offers 33 undergraduate and graduate programs in arts and sciences, business, and education.

=== Sarasota-Manatee campus ===
When USF Sarasota-Manatee was established as a branch campus in 1975, it originally shared a campus with what is now the independent New College of Florida, but was at the time a USF system member called New College of the University of South Florida. New College became independent of the USF system in 2001 and USFSM took its place as a member institution in the USF system, but USFSM and New College continued to share a campus until a new campus was completed for USFSM across the street in 2006. Nearly 2,000 students take classes at USFSM each year. The campus offers 43 academic programs and certificates in arts and sciences, business, education, and hospitality and technology leadership.

On May 26, 2026, Florida State Leigslature agreed to transfer the facilities and ownership of the Sarasota-Manatee campus to New College of Florida. As a result of this, USF retained $22 million in Operation Funds in this budget deal, according to a proposal by Florida Governor Ron DeSantis. USF has introduced a teach out plan, allowing students who are still on the campus to finish their degree, but are no longer admitting students to the Sarasota-Manatee Campus. Ownership of the Sarasota-Manatee campus to New College of Florida officially began on July 1, 2026.

== Academics ==
Fall first-time freshman admission statistics
	2022	2021	2020	2019	2018	2017
Applicants	65,567	50,368	57,758	36,986	35,826	37,492
Admits	28,811	24,881	19,058	17,627	15,207	13,573
Enrolls	6,773	6,251	5,705	5,113	4,536	4,280
Admit rate	43.9%	49.4%	33.0%	47.7%	42.4%	36.2%
Yield rate	23.5%	25.1%	29.9%	29.0%	29.8%	31.5%
SAT composite*	1240–1370 (76%†)	1150–1330 (70%†)	1170–1310 (74%†)	1180–1310 (74%†)	1170–1330 (69%†)	1150–1310 (59%†)
ACT composite*	27–30 (24%†)	24–29 (30%†)	25–30 (26%†)	25–29 (26%†)	25–29 (26%†)	24–29 (41%†)
* middle 50% range, years before 2020 only include info from the Tampa campus † percentage of first-time freshmen who chose to submit

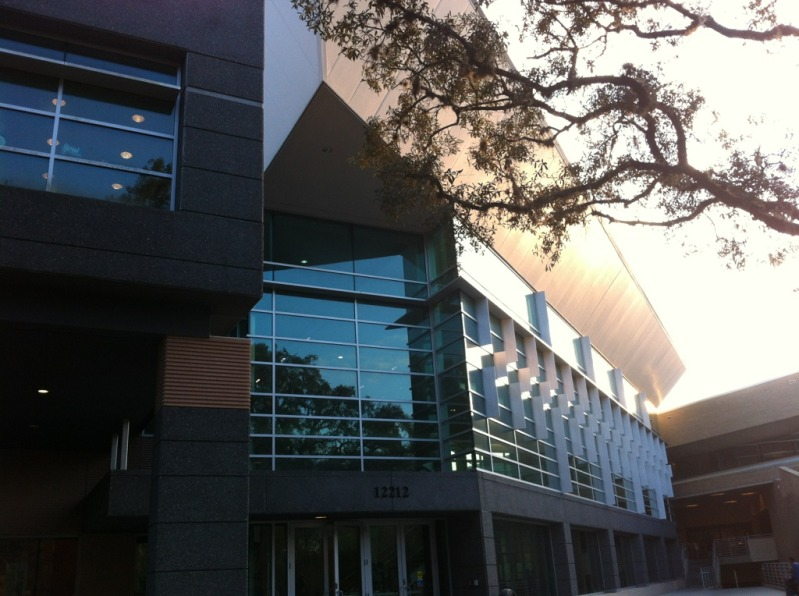
Muma College of Business building

USF offers 91 bachelor's degree programs, 103 master's degree programs, 48 doctoral degree programs, two specialist degree programs, and several certificate programs under 14 colleges. Based on a semester system, the USF academic calendar is composed of three academic semesters each year. The academic year begins in the fall, running from August to December. The spring semester generally begins in January and ends in late April or early May. The summer semester is broken down into three overlapping sessions – A, B, and C – that generally span either six or ten weeks.

=== Tuition ===
As of the 2024–25 academic year, tuition costs are:

Undergraduate
$211.19 per credit hour for in-state students and $611.39 per credit hour for out-of-state and international students. Total (assuming 30 credit hours): $6,335.70 for in-state students and $18,341.70 for out-of-state and international students.
Graduate
$431.43 per credit hour for in-state students and $921.74 per credit hour for out-of-state and international students. Total (assuming 18 credit hours): $7,765.74 for in-state students and $16,591.32 for out-of-state and international students.

In-state tuition has been frozen at all Florida public universities since 2014.

=== Demographics ===
Enrollment in USF (2017–2024)
Academic Year	Undergraduates	Graduate	Total Enrollment
2017–2018	33,707	11,950	45,657
2018–2019	34,155	11,752	45,907
2019–2020	34,743	11,695	46,438
2020–2021	38,579	12,034	50,613
2021–2022	33,077	11,245	44,322
2022–2023	38,046	11,547	49,593
2023–2024	36,452	10,802	48,732

Nearly 49,000 students are enrolled at USF as of the 2023–24 academic year, including over 36,400 undergraduate students, 9,200 graduate students, 1,500 doctor of medicine students, and 1,400 non-degree seeking students. USF is one of the 40 most diverse universities in the nation, with students representing every state, U.S. territory, and more than 140 countries. International students represent approximately 12% of the total USF student population. As of the Fall 2022 semester, the student diversity profile of the university was approximately: 50% White, 9% African American, 23% Hispanic of any race, 9% Asian, 0.2% American Indian, 0.1% Native Hawaiian/Pacific Islander, 4% two or more races, and 5% students who did not report their race. Roughly 60% of USF students are female and 40% are male.

The Fall 2022 Freshman class of approximately 4,000 students earned admission to the university with an average SAT score of 1309 out of 1600, ACT score of 29 out of 36, and high school GPA of 4.21. 41% of the members of the incoming class graduated in the top 10% of their high school class. Among the incoming class were 79 National Merit Scholars.

=== Rankings ===
Academic rankings

National
- Forbes: 107
- U.S. News & World Report: 88 (tie)
- Washington Monthly: 51
- WSJ/College Pulse: 271

Global
- ARWU: 301–400
- QS: =654
- THE: 251–300
- U.S. News & World Report: 357 (tie)

For 2026, U.S. News & World Report ranked USF as tied for #88 overall on its list of Tier I National Universities and #43 among public universities. U.S. News & World Report's 2025 "Best Medical Schools: Research" ranked USF's Morsani College of Medicine in Tier 1—the only Florida school so ranked—making it the state's highest-ranked medical school for research. USF was ranked #103 on the list of all universities, and #46 among public unitversities in 2020, and #181 among all national and #100 among public universities in 2010. This ranking also put USF as #4 in Florida overall and #3 in Florida among public universities. In other rankings released by U.S. News, USF was the only Florida university in the Top 10 Best Value Colleges, at #8 among public universities. USF also ranked #17 in the nation overall, #12 in the nation among public institutions, and #1 in Florida on the U.S. News ranking of top National Universities for Social Mobility. Niche ranked USF #19 for top public universities in America and #67 for best colleges in America 2023. According to Niche, USF was home to the #6 Education Program, #10 Criminal Justice Program, #12 Information Technology Program, #18 Accounting and Finance Program, and #25 Nursing Program in the United States.

=== Colleges ===
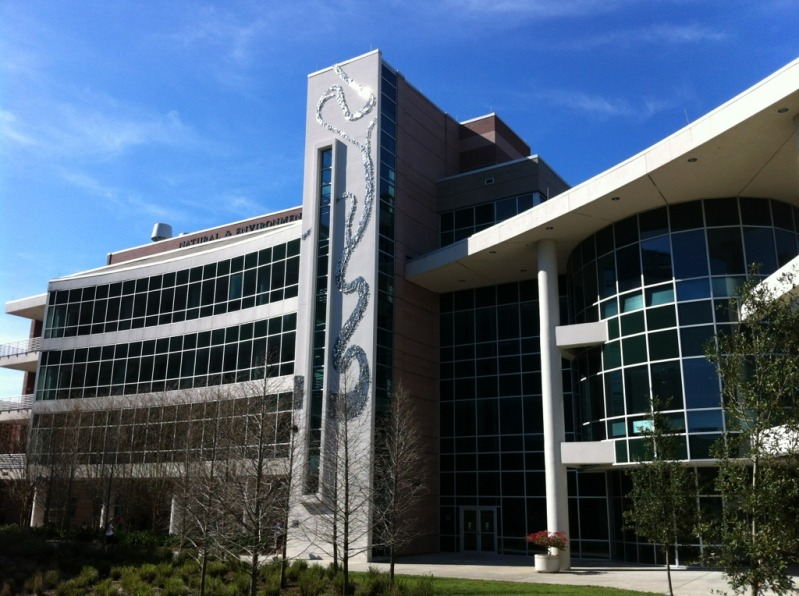
The Natural and Environmental Sciences building

The 14 colleges of the university are:

- College of Arts and Sciences
  - Includes Zimmerman School of Advertising and Mass Communications, which was formerly its own college
- College of Behavioral and Community Sciences
- Muma College of Business
- College of Education
- College of Engineering
- Patel College of Global Sustainability
- Judy Genshaft Honors College
- College of Marine Science
- Morsani College of Medicine
- College of Nursing
- Taneja College of Pharmacy
- College of Public Health
- College of The Arts
- Bellini College of Artificial Intelligence, Cybersecurity, and Computing

=== Faculty ===
As of 2022, there were more than 15,000 instructional faculty and the student to faculty ratio for the campus was 22:1. Approximately 86 percent of full-time faculty members held the highest degree in their field of expertise. Additionally, the university had more than 1,500 adjunct professors, 300 post-doctoral scholars, 2,000 graduate assistants, and 3,000 student assistants.

USF faculty include over 200 scholars receiving prominent scholarly awards, including Fulbright, National Science Foundation, AAAS, Guggenheim, and National Endowment for the Humanities fellowships. In 2012, USF mechanical engineering professor Autar Kaw, was one of four in the nation to receive the Carnegie Foundation for the Advancement of Teaching and Council for Advancement and Support of Education 2012 U.S. Professor of the Year award.

=== Graduation ===
The first USF Commencement ceremony was held in 1963 where 325 degrees were conferred. Now, the school awards over 13,000 degrees each year. Commencement ceremonies are held three times a year at the end of the Fall, Spring, and Summer semesters. Spring ceremonies are generally the largest, with five separate ceremonies held each semester. Commencement ceremonies are held in the Yuengling Center. Since 2013, graduate's names have been announced by Associate Athletic Director Jim Louk, who is known for being the "Voice of the Bulls" as the radio announcer for USF football and basketball games.

== Libraries ==
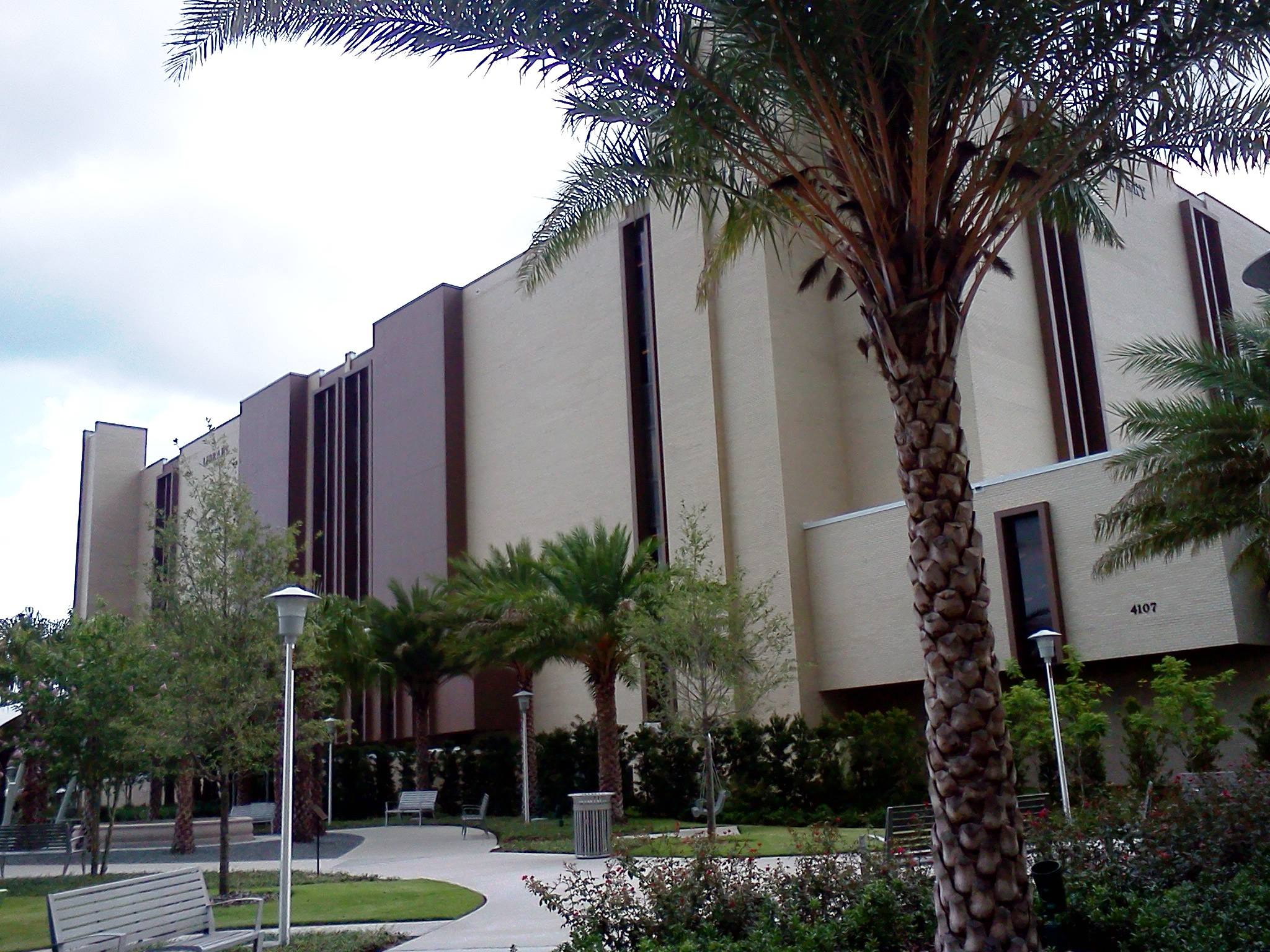
USF Tampa main library

The USF Tampa Library is the largest and most comprehensive library in the USF System. In addition to providing students access to more than 2 million academic journals, databases, and books, the seven-story USF Tampa library offers tutoring and writing services, laptops, a career resource center, Course Reserves, and reservable group study rooms. The USF Tampa Library also houses several Special and Digital Collections, including literature, oral histories, photographs, artifacts, and the university archives. In 2012, the USF Tampa Library opened the Science, Math, and Research Technology (SMART) Lab: a hands-on learning space which includes more than 300 computer work stations. In 2013, USF students successfully protested to keep the library open 24 hours a day/5 days a week during the Fall and Spring semesters for current students, faculty and staff who possess a valid USF ID card. In 2017, renovations were completed on the 5th floor to bring 400 individual study spaces with personal lamps, electrical outlets, and USB ports for device charging, and provided new group study rooms with white boards.

In addition to the Tampa library, the USF Libraries system includes two regional library spaces and the USF Health Libraries. The regional library spaces are the Nelson Poynter Memorial Library, located on the USF St. Petersburg campus, and the Information Commons Hub located on the USF Sarasota-Manatee campus.

USF Health Libraries serve the USF Health community, with two locations, the Hinks and Elaine Shimberg Health Sciences Library located on the USF Tampa campus, and the Florida Blue Health Knowledge Exchange, located at the USF Health campus in downtown Tampa. Beyond providing support to USF students, staff, and faculty, the libraries welcome members of the public who are doing health and medical-related research of their own.

== Research ==
USF is one of the fastest growing research universities in the nation, according to The Chronicle of Higher Education. In the 2021 fiscal year, the university was awarded more than $590 million in research awards. The Intellectual Property Owners Association ranked USF among the top ten universities in the world granted U.S. utility patents in 2011. USF is also a member of the National Space Grant College and Fellowship Program and the National Sea Grant College Program.

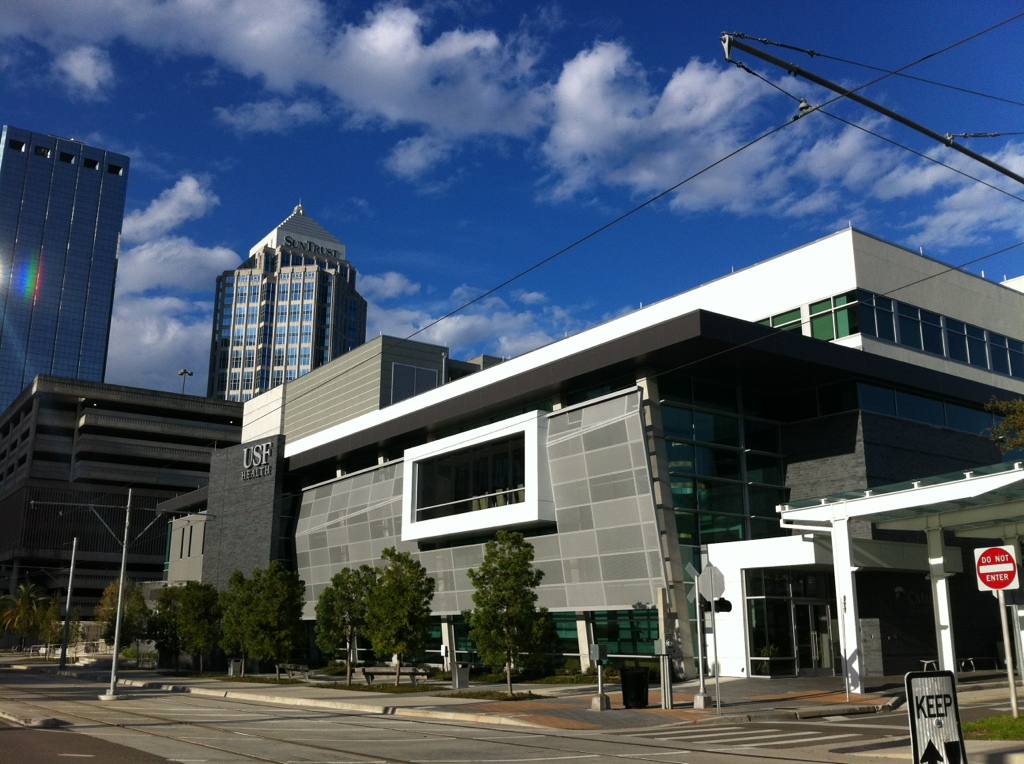
Center for Advanced Medical Learning and Simulation in Downtown Tampa

=== USF Health ===
USF Health consists of the Morsani College of Medicine, College of Nursing, Taneja College of Pharmacy, College of Public Health, the School of Biomedical Sciences (within the College of Arts and Sciences), the School of Physical Therapy and Rehabilitation Sciences, and the USF Physician's Group. USF Health researchers work in the fields of cancer, diabetes, Alzheimer's disease, prosthetics, heart health, genomics, and more. The College of Nursing ranks first in Florida for universities receiving research funding from the National Institutes of Health.

More than 400 healthcare professionals at USF Health treat patients throughout the state of Florida. In 2012, the university opened the Center for Advanced Medical Learning and Simulation in downtown Tampa. The 90,000-square-foot facility serves as an education and training center for health professionals around the world. In 2020, the Morsani College of Medicine and USF Health Heart Institute moved to a new 395,000-square-foot, 13-story highrise tower in the Water Street district of downtown Tampa. The Taneja College of Pharmacy moved to the facility the following year.

=== Sustainability ===
USF was given a gold rating by the Association for the Advancement of Sustainability in Higher Education for building an environmentally-conscious campus. In 2010, the USF School of Global Sustainability was created as part of the College of Behavioral and Community Sciences. In 2012, the new Patel College of Global Sustainability, consisting of the Dr. Kiran C. Patel Center for Global Solutions, the Master of the Arts in Global Sustainability Program, and the Office of Sustainability, was introduced. The college is housed in the first Leadership in Energy and Environmental Design GOLD certified building on the USF Tampa campus.

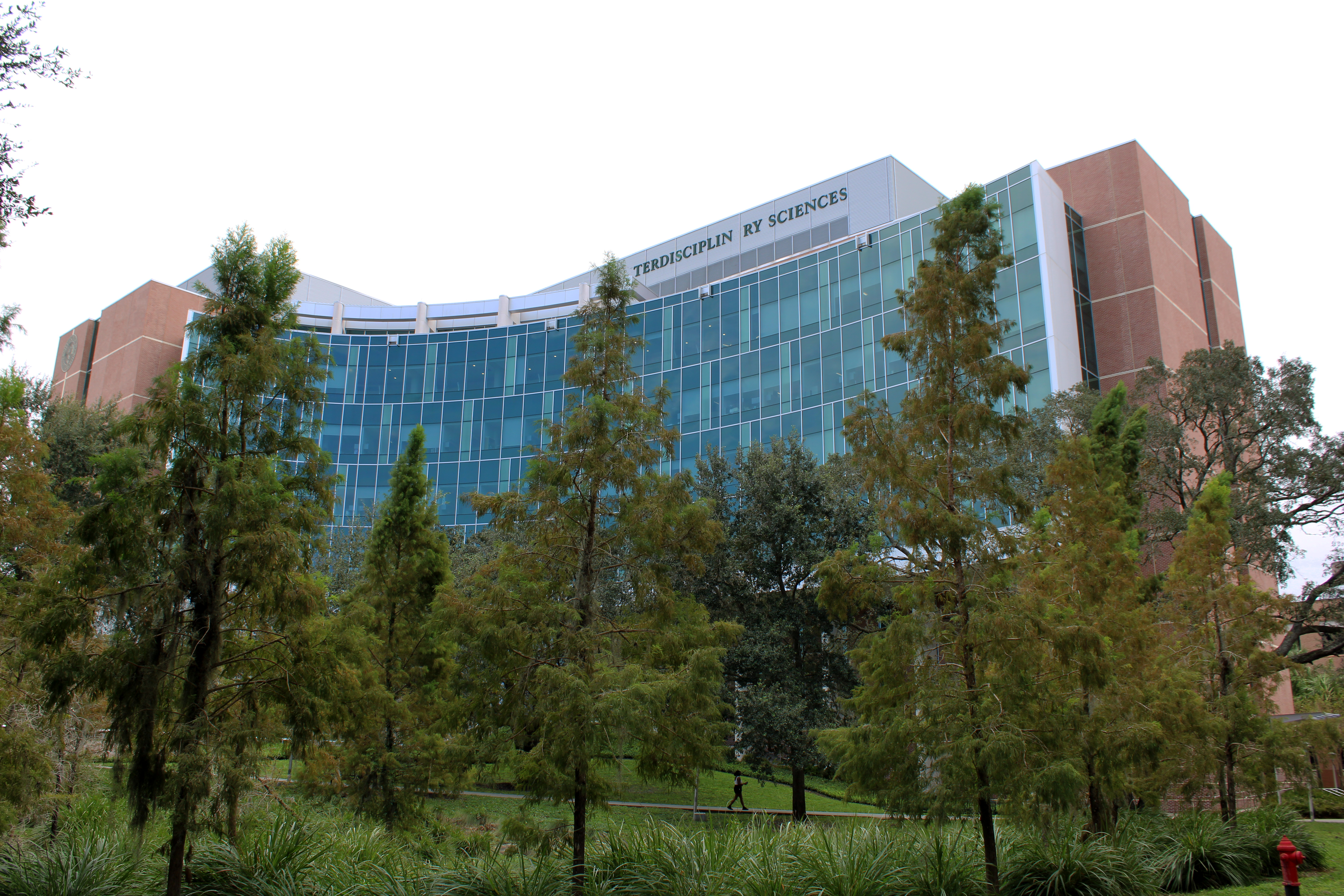
The Interdisciplinary Sciences Building, one of the tallest buildings on the Tampa campus

USF signed the American College and University President's Climate Commitment in 2008 and submitted its Climate Action Plan in 2010 with a goal of a 10 percent reduction in carbon emissions by 2015. Since then, the university has introduced several sustainability initiatives, including electric vehicle charging stations, water bottle filling stations, reusable plastic food containers in dining halls, recycling programs in residence halls, new, more efficient busses for the fare-free campus bus service, solar-powered golf carts, and more. In 2011, the university introduced the Student Green Energy Fund, which allows students to propose and vote on projects that aim to reduce campus energy consumption, lower greenhouse gas emissions, and promote sustainable technologies.

The nearly 20,000 trees on the Tampa campus provide an estimated $1.8 million yearly benefit to the university through energy conserved, stormwater management, and carbon dioxide removal. The campus is renowned for its number of trees and has been named a Tree Campus USA by the Arbor Day Foundation every year since 2011.

Currently, the university has six LEED certified buildings, all of which are on the main Tampa campus or the downtown medical campus. They are the Dr. Kiran C. Patel Center For Global Solutions (Gold), Interdisciplinary Science Building (Gold), Yuengling Center (Silver), Center For Advanced Medical Learning and Simulation (Silver), Chowdhari Golf Practice Facility (Certified), and Morsani Center for Advanced Health Care (Certified).

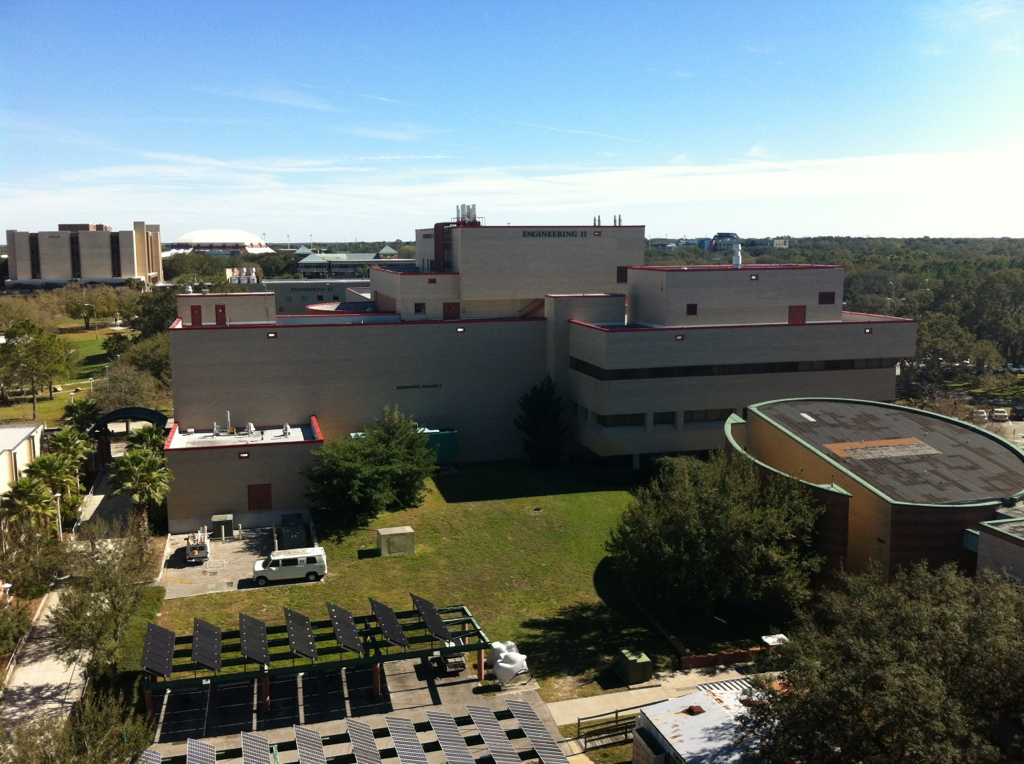
Engineering buildings II and III at USF, with the library in the background

=== Center for Urban Transportation Research ===
Founded in 1988, The Center for Urban Transportation Research conducts over $13 million in research annually for a variety of public and private sector sponsors in Florida and the United States, including the Florida Legislature, the Florida Transportation Commission, and state and local governments, agencies, and organizations. CUTR houses the National Center for Transit Research, designated by the U.S. Congress in 1991, and reaffirmed in 1998, 2002, 2012 and 2013. Areas of research include public transportation, transportation planning, intelligent transportation systems, transportation demand management, transportation economics and finance, geographic information systems, access management, alternative fuels, and transportation safety, among others.

=== Materials Simulation Laboratory ===
The Materials Simulation Laboratory of the Department of Physics was established in 2002. The MSL researches condensed matter and materials physics using supercomputers as tools, focusing on quantum simulations under extreme temperatures and pressures, such as those conditions that occur in planetary interiors and during inertial confinement fusion.

== Student life ==
Undergraduate demographics as of Fall 2023
Race and ethnicity	Total
White	44%
Hispanic	23%
Asian	9%
Black	8%
International student	8%
Two or more races	4%
Unknown	3%
Economic diversity
Low-income (Note: The percentage of students who received an income-based federal Pell grant intended for low-income students.)	32%
Affluent (Note: The percentage of students who are a part of the American middle class at the bare minimum.)	68%

The USF Tampa campus provides multiple services and resources necessary for students to succeed both in the classroom and in their personal lives. Under the Division of Student Affairs, USF students have access to involvement opportunities, on-campus housing, dining facilities, recreational outlets, health and wellness services, and more.

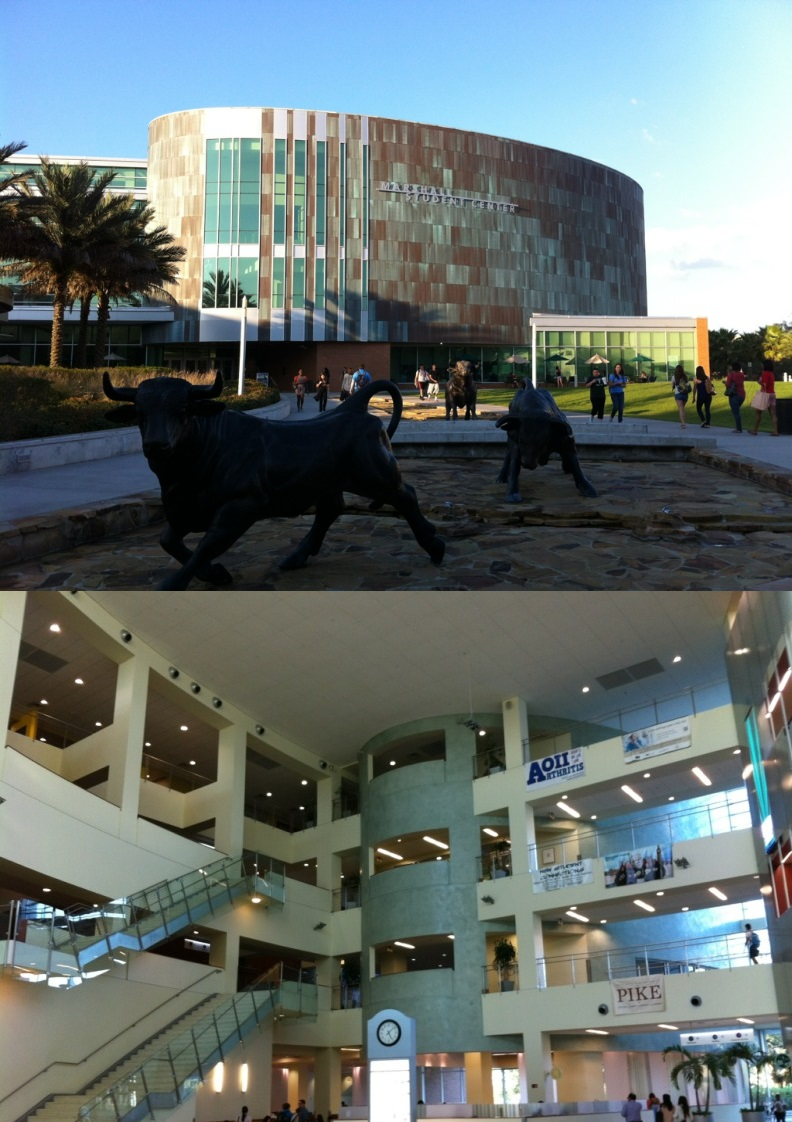
Marshall Student Center

=== Marshall Student Center ===
In 2008 the university opened a new student union called the Marshall Student Center. The name pays homage to Phyllis P. Marshall, the longtime director of the former student union, which was also named after her. The four-story building features a 1,200 seat ballroom, 800-seat auditorium, 100 workstation computer lab, study and meeting spaces, several student lounge areas, and outdoor courtyards. The facility offers several retail outlets including a credit union, commuter lounge, and identification card center. The MSC features ten dining options including Panera, Chick-fil-A, and Subway.

As the home of the USF Center for Leadership and Civic Engagement, Student Government, the Center for Student Involvement, the Office of Fraternity and Sorority Life, and the Office of Multicultural Affairs, the center is considered to be the gathering place for all things student life at USF.

==== Centre Gallery ====
The Centre Gallery is a student-run exhibition space within the Marshall Student Center for the University of South Florida's students, faculty, staff and alumni offering the university community and the Tampa Bay area stimulating visual art experiences by consistently exhibiting innovative, contemporary art work.

Centre Gallery, established in 1984, is the only fully student run, non-profit, exhibition space in the state of Florida. Exhibitions run in two-week durations during the Fall and Spring and three-week durations during the summer. These exhibitions are attended by over 4,000 visitors each semester.

==== Former student union ====
The original USF student union was built in 1959 and opened in 1960. Originally called the University Center, it was one of the first five buildings that made up the USF Tampa campus when it opened. In its early years, the University Center held the first on-campus women's residence hall, a cafeteria, post office, bookstore, game room, television room, and information desk. Classes were held in the basement and first floor of the building until other academic buildings were completed. The center underwent major renovations from 1988 to 1990. It was renamed the Phyllis P. Marshall Center in 1993, in honor of the woman who served as director of the building from 1976 to 1994. In order to better serve the growing student population on the Tampa campus, the building was torn down and replaced with a new 230,000-square-foot union in 2008.

=== Bellini Center for Talent Development ===
In 2022, the university established the Bellini Center for Talent Development, funded by a $10.6 million donation from alumni Arnie and Lauren Bellini. The Center provides career services, industry-specific training, and internship placement support for business students in the Tampa Bay area. The center is located in a 9,000-square-foot facility on the university's Tampa Campus.

=== Bull statues ===
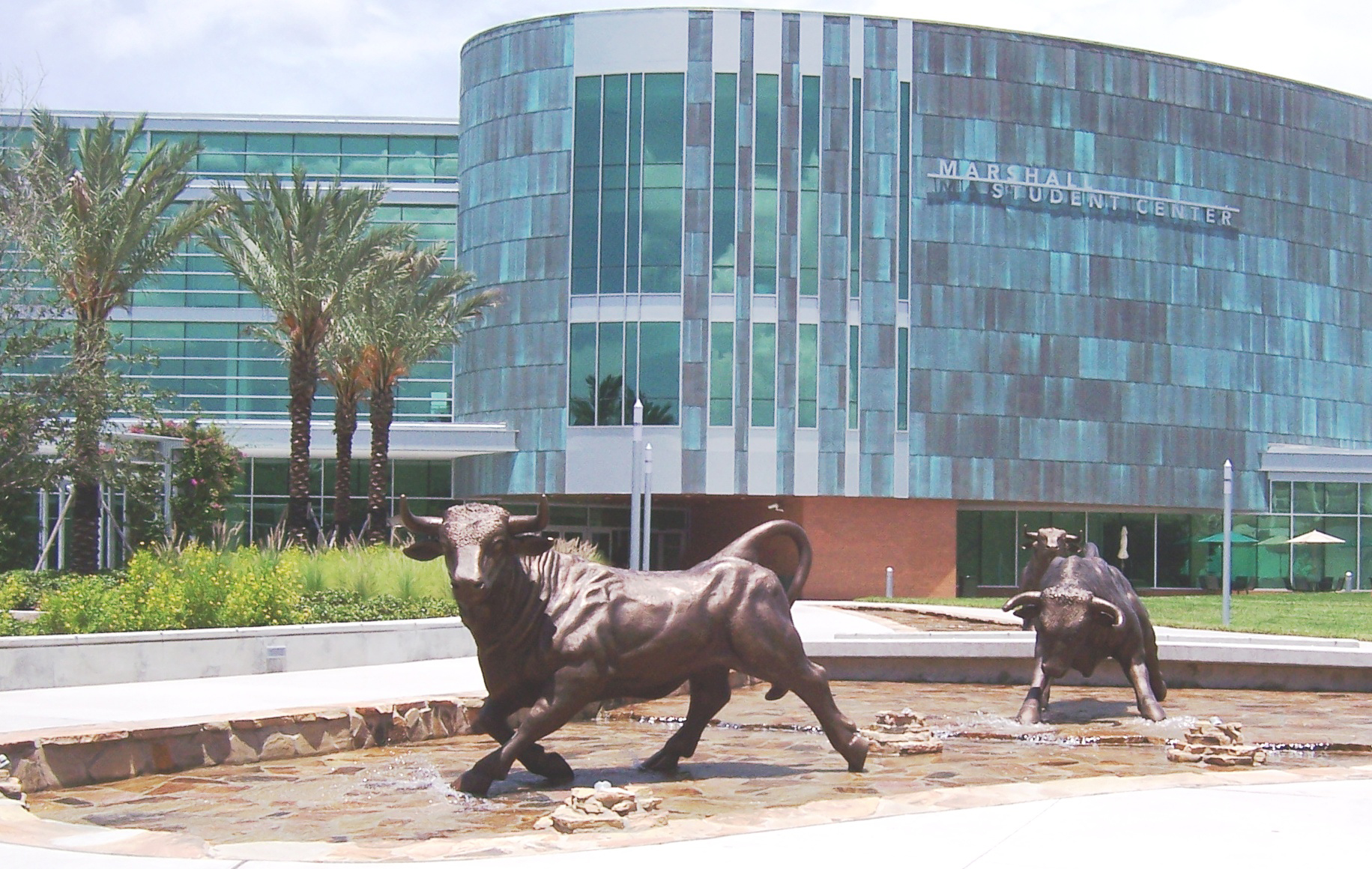
The bull statues in front of the Marshall Student Center

The university has a total of 9 life size bronze bull statues across the three campuses, with one on the St. Petersburg campus, one on the Sarasota-Manatee campus, and seven on the Tampa campus (three in front of the south entrance of the Marshall Student Center, three in The Village housing complex, and one in front of the student entrance at the Yuengling Center, plus a 15-foot tall topiary bull at the north entrance of the Marshall Student Center). Each statue has its own distinct design with every bull standing in a different position.

The bull statue on the St. Petersburg campus was installed on February 7, 2013. It weighs 850 lbs (~386 kg) at a cost of $10,000.

These statues are a rich part of USF tradition. The original three statues (the ones outside the MSC, dubbed the "Running of the Bulls") plus the topiary bull represent the four years a student spends in college, with the topiary bull representing a student's senior year as it symbolizes the student's growth over the past four years and faces one of the main entrances to campus (Palm Drive) as it will soon run off into the world. As the student government president, Mark Lombardi stated, "It's about building campus tradition and culture. It's going to be the first thing you take your picture with and the last thing you take your picture with. It's going to be forever, and it should be because this is who we are: we're the bulls."

=== Martin Luther King, Jr. Plaza ===
One of the most popular gathering spots on the Tampa campus is Martin Luther King, Jr. Plaza, which is located between the John and Grace Allen Building and the Marshall Student Center, marked by a small bust of the civil rights activist. Beneath the bust of Dr. King are five granite lines pointing in the directions of five cities significant to his legacy: Atlanta, Boston, Memphis, Montgomery, and Washington D.C. The bust faces a reflecting pool with fountains which marks the geographical center of campus. On the other side of the pool are stone tablets engraved with Dr. King's "I Have a Dream" speech.

=== Botanical Gardens ===
The 15 acre botanical garden on USF's Tampa campus was established in 1969 for use by the Biology Department. The garden contains over 3,000 taxa of plants including fruit trees, bonsai trees, grasses, begonias, orchids, bromeliads, palms, aroids, bamboo, gingers, carnivorous plants, cycads, cactus and succulent plants, an herb and scent garden, wetland forest, temperate forest, subtropical shade garden, and Florida upland scrub and sandhill habitats. The gardens also has a medicinal herb garden, which is used by the USF College of Pharmacy for research purposes. The garden is open to the public six days a week and admission is free for students.

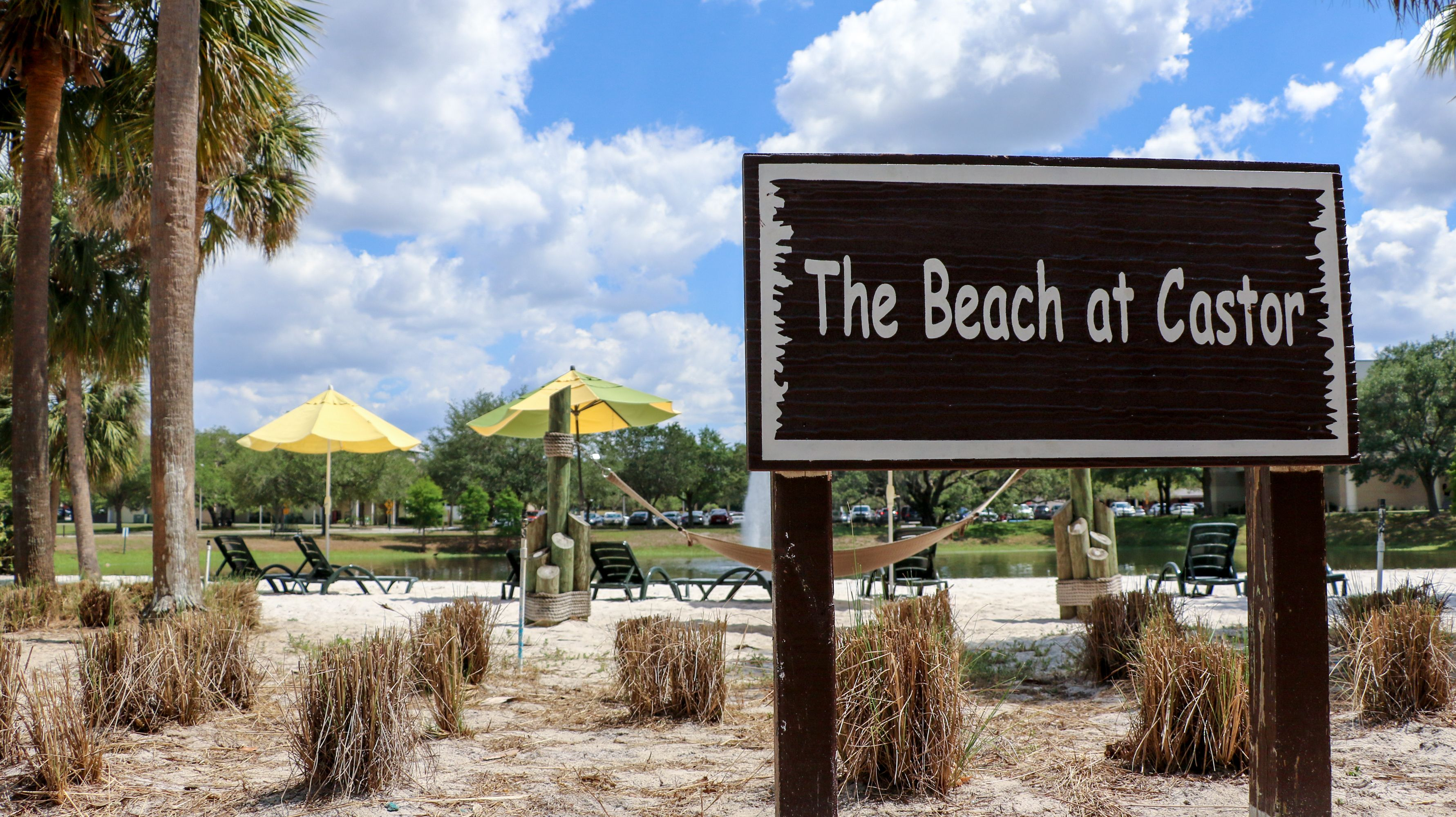
Castor Beach

=== Castor Beach ===
Castor Beach is an artificial beach on campus by the lake outside of Betty Castor Hall, one of the largest dorms on the Tampa campus. The beach is complete with white sand taken from the nearby Clearwater Beach, which is regularly voted as one of America's best beaches. The area has a beach volleyball net, hammocks, and chairs with umbrellas and is a popular spot for relaxing on campus. Swimming in the lake is not allowed due to alligators and untested water quality.

=== Housing ===
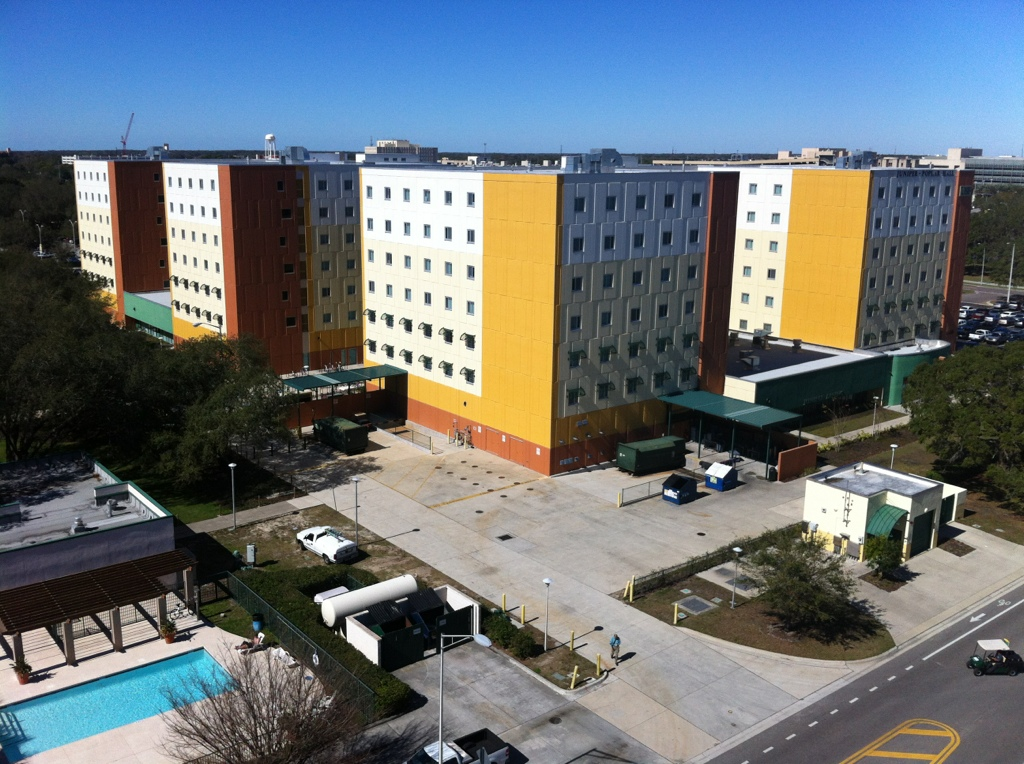
Juniper Hall (front) and Poplar Hall (back), the two largest dorms on campus

There are 14 sets of residence halls on the USF Tampa campus, offering traditional, suite, and apartment-style housing. In total, these residential halls provide housing to more than 6,500 students. The university also offers specialized housing options such as family housing, female-only housing, graduate student housing, and 14 houses for fraternity and sorority members in the Greek Village. The first of these residence halls, Alpha Hall (later renamed to Kosove Apartments), funded by a "Dollars for Dorms" campaign, opened in 1961.

The St. Petersburg campus has three residence halls with over 600 beds. The first of these residence halls, Residence Hall One (later renamed to Pelican Apartments), opened in 2006.

The Sarasota-Manatee campus has one residence hall with 200 beds. This residence hall, Atala Hall, opened in 2024.

=== Campus recreation ===
==== Gyms ====
The Campus Recreation Center on the USF Tampa campus is a 21,000-square-foot, WiFi-enabled fitness facility featuring a two-basketball court gymnasium, six group fitness rooms, a bouldering wall, a 200-meter indoor three-lane running track, 120 pieces of cardio equipment, six racquetball courts, and a 25-meter indoor swimming pool. Inside the facility, members can work out, take group fitness classes, play intramural sports, rent equipment, receive personal training, undergo fitness assessments, and more. The Campus Recreation Center, known as the USF Gymnasium at the time, was also the first on campus home to USF's men's basketball team, who played three home games there in 1978–79 before the completion of the Sun Dome. It also hosted all of the women's basketball team's home games from their founding in 1972 until they moved to the Sun Dome in 1980, as well as in the 2011–12 season while the Sun Dome underwent renovations (the men's team primarily played at Amalie Arena in downtown Tampa during that season). This area has space for roughly 1,500 spectators.

In addition to the Campus Recreation Center, there are other, smaller fitness facilities on the USF Tampa campus: The Fit in the Village housing complex, the WELL in the USF Health area, and the Magnolia Fitness Center within the Magnolia Apartments complex; plus a 1.25-mile long fitness trail through the woods near the varsity tennis courts complete with exercise stations.

==== Other recreation ====
Through the Campus Recreation Department, USF offers more than 30 intramural sports throughout the academic year. USF Campus Recreation also maintains USF Riverfront Park, located 1.5 miles away from the Tampa campus. The recreational park is only open for use to USF students, faculty, and staff. Located on the Hillsborough River, the park boathouse offers canoeing, kayaking, and paddleboarding for a small fee. Groups can sign up to climb the 55-foot high ropes course located at the park, which features three levels of challenges. A less challenging version of the ropes course, called the low ropes workshop, allows teams to participate in trust-building exercises and group problem solving. The park also has an 18-hole disk golf course.

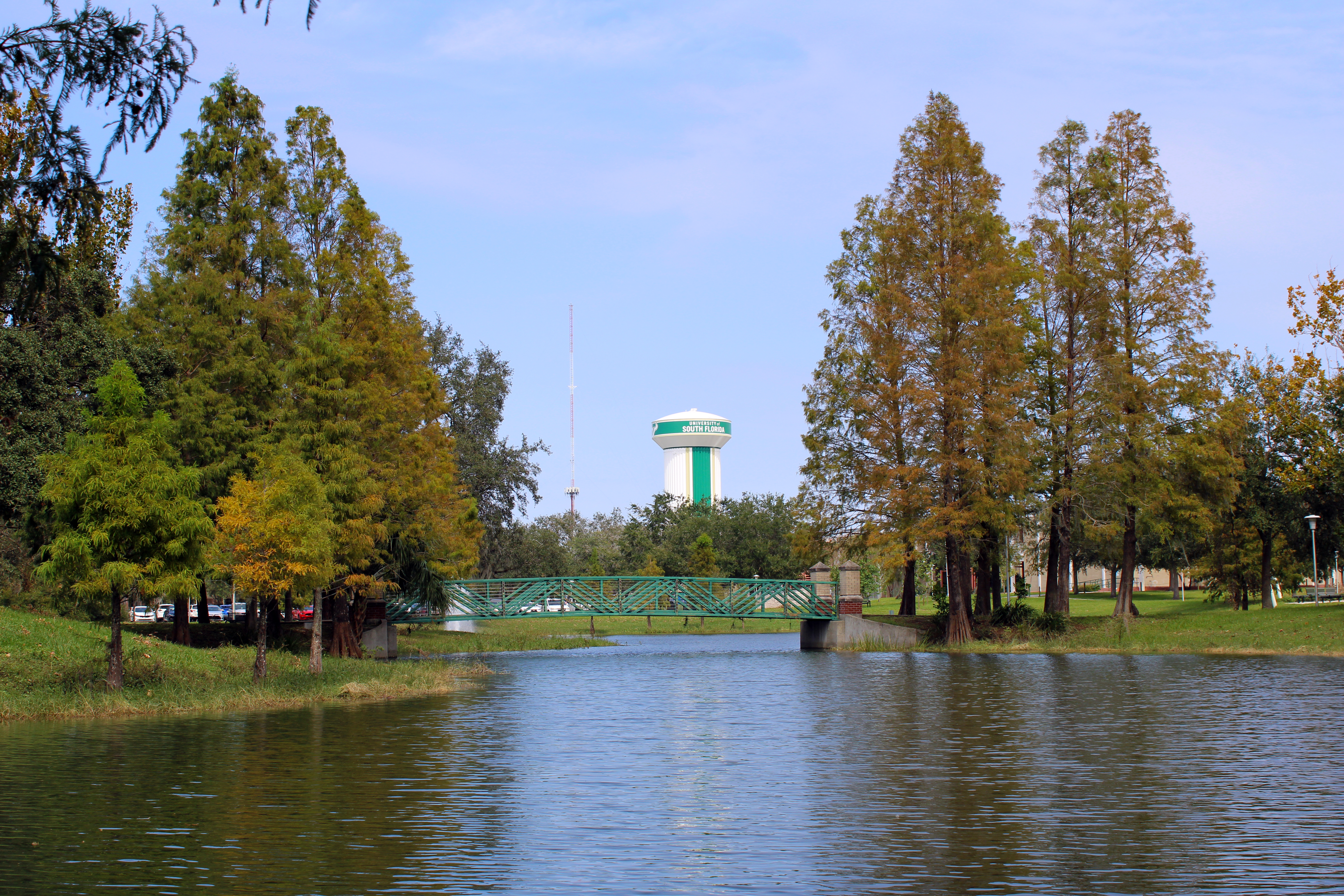
The Water Tower as seen from Simmons Park on the Tampa campus

==== Club sports ====
The Campus Recreation Department also offers over 40 club sports teams to students, including rugby, lacrosse, and even ice hockey. These teams mainly compete against club teams from other nearby schools such as Florida, Tampa, and Central Florida as well as nationally in leagues like the American Collegiate Hockey Association. Club teams have won 17 national championships for USF; two in flag football, two in karate, two in cricket, two in paintball, nine in cheer, and one in wakeboarding; as well as one world championship in cheer.

=== Harborwalk ===
Harborwalk is an area on the St. Petersburg campus that connects the campus with other nearby attractions in the downtown area, including Poynter Park, the Salvador Dalí Museum, and Al Lang Stadium. It runs along Bayboro Harbor on the east border of campus and is home to things like the University Student Center and Sembler Fountain.

=== Student involvement ===
There are more than 600 registered student organizations at USF, including academic, professional, special interest, Greek, and multicultural groups. USF students are welcome to join existing organizations or apply to create their own. The USF Center for Student Involvement, located in the Marshall Student Center, provides multiple programs throughout the academic year, including the University Lecture Series, Homecoming Week, USF Week, and more. In addition to the Center for Student Involvement, the Center for Leadership and Civic Engagement offers numerous opportunities for organization involvement, personal and organizational leadership development, and community service.

==== Fraternity and sorority life ====
There are 27 fraternities and 24 sororities recognized by the Office of Fraternity and Sorority Life, all of which are located on the Tampa campus. Four councils govern these chapters: the Interfraternity Council, the National Pan-Hellenic Council, the Panhellenic Association, and the Unified Greek Council. Greek Village, a residential area on the USF Tampa campus offers housing for members of 12 fraternities and sororities.

==== ROTC ====
The USF Tampa campus offers three Reserve Officers' Training Corps (ROTC) programs: Air Force, Army, and Navy. USF is one of only 38 universities in the nation to offer all three service ROTC programs. The university was the first in the nation to create a Joint Military Leadership Center (JMLC) to house all three programs. Located in the C.W. Bill Young Hall, the JMLC is a 53,000-square-foot state-of-the-art facility featuring a weapons simulation room, an outdoor rappelling wall, a joint cadet and midshipmen lounge, three lecture halls, and five classrooms. The building is equipped to handle web-casting, video conferencing, and distance learning.

The university offers three military-related minors at the Tampa campus. The sixteen-credit hour Aerospace Studies Minor provides an understanding of military officer management and leadership concepts, as well as an analysis of the evolution of American defense policy and strategy. The eighteen-credit hour Military Science Minor provides students with an in-depth understanding of Army leadership doctrine and a framework for applying such concepts outside of the classroom. The eighteen-credit hour Naval Science and Leadership Minor places special emphasis on character development and effective communication skills, while providing an understanding of the Naval leadership doctrine and the fundamental principles used by leaders in the Navy and Marine Corps.

Students enrolled in a USF ROTC program have the opportunity to live in the on-campus ROTC Living Learning Community (LLC). Located in the suite-style Maple Hall, the ROTC LLC allows students to be exposed to the customs of each military branch, while developing camaraderie with their fellow cadets and midshipmen.

==== Student Government ====
The USF Student Government, like all Florida student governments, is an agency of the state created under Florida Statute 1004.26. Student Government, made up of 250 student volunteers and employees, is responsible for advocating for students at the university, local, state and national levels. The Student Senate allocates over $17 million in activity and service fees a year by Florida law.

The executive administration oversees several departments and service agencies including SAFE Team, Student Government Computer Services, and Bulls Radio. The Student Body President can also be voted in to sit on the University Board of Trustees and is a member of the Florida Student Association (FSA).

The Student Senate, headed by the Senate President and Senate President Pro-Tempore, creates legislation and allocates and expends activity and service fee funds per Florida Statute 1009.24. The senate has 60 seats that are filled by the 14 colleges. Each college is allotted a certain number of seats depending on the size of the college. The Senate carries out its duties mostly through committees.

=== University and student media ===
Beginning in 1961, a local afternoon newspaper, The Tampa Times, covered university news in the one-page weekly "Campus Edition". Now defunct, the newspaper was succeeded by The Oracle. First published in 1966, the weekly broadsheet was distributed every Wednesday. Housed today in the Student Services Building of the Tampa campus, the student-run newspaper is published four times a week during the Fall and Spring semesters and twice a week during the Summer semesters. The 12,000 circulation newspaper has been recognized by the Society of Professional Journalists and the Associated Collegiate Press for excellence in journalism.

Owned by USF, WUSF (FM) first began airing in 1963. A member station of National Public Radio, the broadcast studio is located on the USF Tampa campus. Currently, the FM station broadcasts NPR and local news during the day and jazz music in the overnight hours. The station is funded by local corporate and private contributors, as well as the Corporation for Public Broadcasting and is affiliated with the Public Broadcasting Service. In 2003, WUSF 89.7 became the first public radio station in the nation to broadcast a digital signal. Today, WUSF Public Media offers local and national news coverage, educational programming, and jazz and classical music through WUSF 89.7, WSMR 89.1, WEDQ, IntellisMedia, and WUSF New Media.

The student-run radio station at USF, now known as Bulls Radio, first went on the air in 1988. Formerly known as "WBUL" until 2009, the station broadcasts from the Marshall Student Center, where student reporters and DJs broadcast from a studio featuring a window that overlooks the Bullpen restaurant. Now one of the largest student-run radio stations in the state of Florida, Bulls Radio can be heard on 1620 AM, 88.5 HD2 or online.

=== Traditions ===
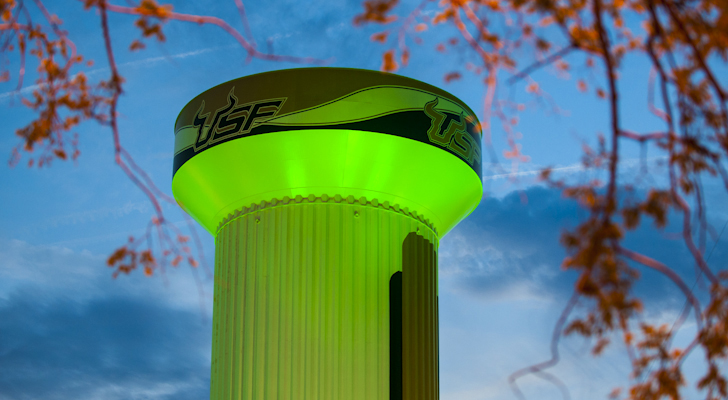
USF's water tower lit up green after a Bulls win

USF's hand sign is "Horns Up", similar to Texas's "Hook 'em Horns". The sign is used by fans at games for good luck during field goals, extra points, free throws, etc.; and as a general greeting or show of school spirit.

Since 1995, the university has shined green lights (as opposed to the usual white lights) on its iconic water tower the night following a victory by any of the Bulls sports teams to let the campus and surrounding area know of the win. The school also lights the water tower green for special events like homecoming and commencement ceremonies.

The Bull Market is an open air weekly market that hosts a combination of vendors, student organizations, and not-for-profit organizations showcasing their products and services. The Bull Market takes place every Wednesday outside the Marshall Student Center and is one of the oldest traditions at USF.

The university has a motif of trees, with nearly 20,000 on the Tampa campus alone. The love of trees started with USF's first president John Allen, who wanted to cover the university with them since there were zero trees on the campus when it was founded. Still today, students plant dozens of trees every year on Arbor Day. In honor of this, much of the campus is or once was named after trees. Nearly every road at the Tampa campus is, besides Alumni Drive, LeRoy Collins Boulevard (named after the governor of Florida who signed the bill that created USF), and Genshaft Drive (known as Maple Drive until 2019 and named after former USF President Judy Genshaft, who filled the position for nearly 20 years). Many dorms are also named after trees, and the football team's original meeting facilities were called "the Ponderosa". In addition, the university mace is crowned with a gold pinecone which signifies both growth and that the first tree planted on campus by President Allen was a pine tree.

==== Homecoming ====
Beginning in 1964, homecoming festivities are one of the longest standing traditions at USF. Events include a comedy show, a homecoming ball, a concert, a parade, and a carnival (called Carni-BULL), all leading up to the football game that weekend. Before USF's football team was founded, homecoming took place in the spring semester and led up to a basketball game.

==== USF Week ====
In 2009, Tampa mayor and USF alum Pam Iorio declared April 9 as USF Day. The celebration has evolved to include the entire week of April 9, and features events including a pep rally, talent show, battle of the bands, a birthday celebration for Rocky the Bull, and Bullstock, a music festival which features multiple artists and is opened by the winner of the battle of the bands competition the day prior.

==== Alma Mater ====
USF Alma Mater

The university alma mater was composed by USF professor of music Wayne Hugoboom in 1960. The song was the result of a campus competition, for which Hugoboom won the first-place $250 prize. The alma mater was first used in 1961 and can be heard at the opening of every USF Commencement Ceremony. It is also played by the USF Herd of Thunder marching band and Rumble pep band after every football and basketball game, respectively. A recording of the song is also played over the loudspeakers at sports which do not feature either the Herd of Thunder or Rumble.

==== Golden Brahman March ====
Golden Brahman March
USF's fight song

USF's fight song, the Golden Brahman March, is named after the original USF mascot. In 1962, students voted to make USF's mascot the Golden Brahman, a breed of cattle, because of the state's history in cattle raising. Although the university mascot has since evolved into the Bulls, the fight song name preserves the history of this USF icon. In 2011, the university athletics department launched a campaign to encourage students, faculty, staff, and fans to memorize the song. Today, incoming students are taught the song, along with other USF cheers, during new student and transfer orientation sessions.

==== Other songs ====
"The Bull"
USF rally cry

March Victorious

"The Bull" (also known as Number 8) is a rallying cry played by the USF Herd of Thunder marching band that encourages fans to stand up and circle the "Go Bulls" hand symbol above their heads.

== Athletics ==
USF competed in its first intercollegiate athletic event on September 25, 1965, when it defeated the Florida Southern College men's soccer team. The university was admitted into the NCAA in 1968, and currently competes at the NCAA Division I level. USF was a charter member of the Sun Belt Conference, joined Conference USA in 1995, was admitted into the Big East Conference in 2003, and is currently a member of the American Conference. There are nearly 500 student-athletes across 20 varsity sports competing for the university each academic year.

USF teams have won 171 conference championships and one NCAA national championship (women's swimming in 1985) as of May 2025. They also have four NCAA national runner up finishes (men's swimming in 1971, men's golf in 1971 and 1972, and rifle in 1989). Athletes have won 19 individual NCAA national championships (seven in women's swimming, six in men's swimming, two in rifle, three in men's outdoor track and field, and one in men's indoor track and field) and five relay NCAA national championships (three in women's swimming, one in men's swimming, and one in men's outdoor track and field). Despite the numerous individual, relay, and team national championships in rifle, men's swimming, and women's swimming, the university no longer sponsors any of these sports. In non-NCAA sanctioned varsity sports, the USF softball team won the American Softball Association National Championships in 1983 and 1984. This was the highest level of college softball at the time as the NCAA didn't start sponsoring the sport until 1985. The Bulls sailing team won the 2009 Inter-Collegiate Sailing Association Sloop National Championship and the 2016 and 2017 ICSA Offshore Large Boats National Championships.

As of the 2024 Summer Olympics, 20 USF alumni representing 13 countries have competed as athletes in the Olympic Games. Évelyne Viens of Canada's women's soccer team became the first USF alum to win an Olympic medal as an athlete when Team Canada won gold in 2020; though other USF alumni such as Ken Eriksen won medals as coaches before this.

The university was the preseason training camp site for the Baltimore Colts in 1972.

=== Teams ===
Bulls Athletic wordmark

The university currently sponsors 20 varsity men's and women's sports:

Men's sports	Women's sports
Baseball	Basketball
Basketball	Cross country
Cross country	Golf
Football	Lacrosse
Golf	Sailing
Soccer	Soccer
Tennis	Softball
Track & field^{†}	Tennis
	Track & field^{†}
	Volleyball
† – Track and field includes both indoor and outdoor.

Additionally, USF will add a women's beach volleyball team in the 2025–26 school year.

USF also offers many club teams, including men's and women's rugby, cricket, and men's ice hockey. USF's club teams have won 17 national championships and one world championship in their various divisions.

=== Athletic facilities ===
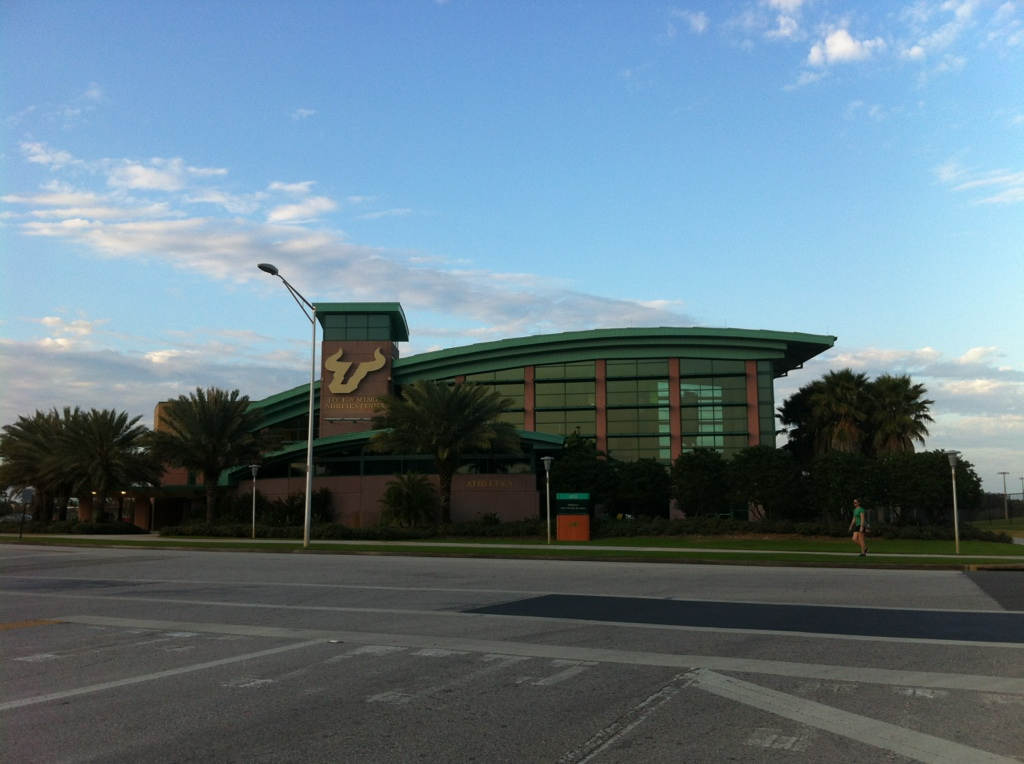
Lee Roy Selmon Athletic Center

Located along the eastern edge of the Tampa campus, the USF Athletic District is the home for 18 of the Bulls 19 varsity sports, with sailing being the only one not located there. The district includes the Lee Roy Selmon Athletic Center, Corbett Stadium, the Frank Morsani Football Practice Complex, the Pam & Les Muma Basketball Practice Center, the Yuengling Center, The Claw, the USF Baseball Stadium, the USF Softball Stadium, the USF Track and Field Stadium, the Corral, and the USF Varsity Tennis Courts.

==== Lee Roy Selmon Athletic Center ====
Opened in 2004, the Lee Roy Selmon Athletic Center is the main headquarters for USF Athletics. In 2012, the facility was dedicated to the late Lee Roy Selmon, a Pro Football Hall of Fame member and former Director of USF Athletics. Selmon is considered by many to be the "Father of USF Football". The 104,000-square-foot facility houses all of USF's sports teams except for men's and women's basketball, sailing, and volleyball. The building features a large strength and conditioning center, a sports medicine clinic, the USF Athletic Hall of Fame and trophy room, and an Academic Enrichment Center complete with a computer study lab, a library, study lounges, and academic counseling.

==== Yuengling Center ====
The Yuengling Center on the Tampa campus is the home facility of the men's and women's basketball teams and the women's volleyball team. The first event held in the facility was a basketball game in 1980. Since the opening of the arena, it has been the site for USF Commencement Ceremonies, orientation sessions, and other major university events. The facility has also played host to a number of outside events including sports and entertainment events such as WWE ThunderDome, consumer shows, religious services, conventions, rodeos, youth sports camps, gymnastics and cheerleading competitions, lectures, and political rallies. The venue is also one of the top concert spots in the Tampa Bay region, having hosted musicians like Elton John, Florence and the Machine, Frank Sinatra, Heart, Sting, and more. The building became LEED Silver certified in 2014.

==== Raymond James Stadium ====
The USF football team plays at Raymond James Stadium, home to the NFL's Tampa Bay Buccaneers. USF is one of only five FBS teams to play in an NFL stadium (the others being Miami, Temple, Pitt, and UNLV). The stadium is located 13 miles away from the Tampa campus and has a capacity of more than 75,000 people, making it the largest in the American Conference, but seating for most games is limited to the lower bowl, cutting capacity to around 45,000. The student section at Raymond James is the largest in the conference with over 12,000 seats.

==== Corbett Stadium ====
The USF men's and women's soccer teams play at Corbett Stadium on the main campus in Tampa. The stadium has over 1,000 seats, plus standing room only space for over 2,000 more on the grassy berms that surround the field. Corbett Stadium opened in 2011 and replaced USF Track and Field Stadium as the home of the Bulls men's and women's soccer teams. Corbett Stadium also hosts the USF football team's annual spring game. It will be home to the women's lacrosse team when they begin play in 2024.

=== Spirit squads ===
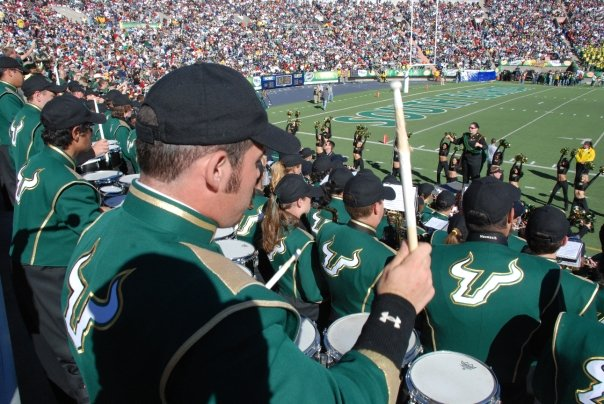
USF Herd of Thunder Marching Band at the Sun Bowl

The USF Spirit Squads — consisting of the USF Sun Dolls dance team, USF Cheerleading Squad, Rocky the Bull, and the Herd of Thunder marching band — play an integral role in USF Athletics. In addition to supporting USF varsity athletic teams during sporting events, the spirit squads themselves compete at the national level. Both the all-girl and co-ed teams regularly rank among the best in the country, with the co-ed team winning the UCA Division I-A national championship in 2021, 2022 and 2023 and the all-girl team winning the title in 2024.

Rocky the Bull first began as a toy idea for the USF Bookstore in 1965. Today's version Rocky was unveiled in 2003. As the official mascot for USF, Rocky the Bull can be seen at USF Athletic events, as well as other major university and community events.

The USF Herd of Thunder consists of several bands, including a 370-member marching band, pep band, show band, and winter guard. The marching band performs at all home and some away USF football games. The pep band, called the Herd of Thunder Rumble Pep Band, performs at all home men's and women's basketball and volleyball games, plus conference and NCAA tournament games in some other sports when applicable. The show band is a 30-piece group that performs at select events that are unable to accommodate the full marching band.

== Notable alumni ==
Some notable USF graduates include:

=== Academics ===
- George Gatewood, 1965, M.A. 1968, astronomer; retired director of Allegheny Observatory and professor at University of Pittsburgh
- Jamal Nassar, M.A. 1974, Dean of California State University, San Bernardino
- Alan Boss, 1973, astrophysicist and former president of several International Astronomical Union commissions while at the Carnegie Institution of Science
- Michele Ronnick, B.A. 1975, Distinguished Service Professor in the College of Liberal Arts and Sciences at Wayne State University
- Rhea Law, 1977, 8th President of the University of South Florida
- Seth Kalichman, 1983, Professor of Social psychology, known for research into HIV/AIDS treatment and HIV/AIDS denialism
- Lee Kump, 1986, Dean of Penn State University College of Earth and Material Science
- Michael Rao, 1987, President of Virginia Commonwealth University, former president of Central Michigan University
- Amine Bensaid, 1990, M.S. 1992, Ph.D. 1994, President of Al Akhawayn University, expert in machine learning, neural networks, and genetic algorithms
- Tonjua Williams, M.A. 1996, president of St. Petersburg College
- Aysegul Timur, Ph.D. 2006, president of Florida Gulf Coast University

=== Athletes ===
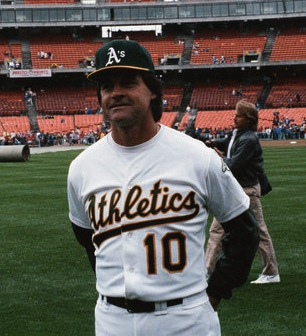
- Tony La Russa
  Tony La Russa, 1969, MLB infielder and manager, three time World Series champion as a manager, member of the National Baseball Hall of Fame, second-winningest manager in MLB history
- Ed Baird, 1982, two-time America's Cup champion (1995, 2007), seven-time world champion, member of the National Sailing Hall of Fame
- Roy Wegerle, 1983, member of the U.S. Men's National Soccer Team, third-most goals by an American in Premier League history, 1997 MLS Champion
- Ken Eriksen, 1984, former USF baseball player and USF softball head coach 1997–present, winningest head coach in USF history, Team USA softball manager 2011–present
- Tomer Steinhauer, 1989, Israeli basketball center and coach
- Radenko Dobraš, 1992, Serbian basketball guard
- Mark Chung, 1992, member of the U.S. Men's National Soccer Team
- Derrick Sharp, 1993, American-Israeli Israeli Basketball Premier League and EuroLeague basketball player and coach, 29 club titles including three EuroLeague championships as a player (2001, 2004, 2005), 9 club titles as a coach

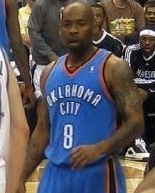
Chucky Atkins

- Chucky Atkins, 1996, NBA point guard, 14-year NBA career, 2004 NBA champion
- Kemel Thompson, 1996, two-time Olympic track & field athlete
- Jeff Cunningham, 1997, member of the U.S. Men's National Soccer Team, third most goals in Major League Soccer history
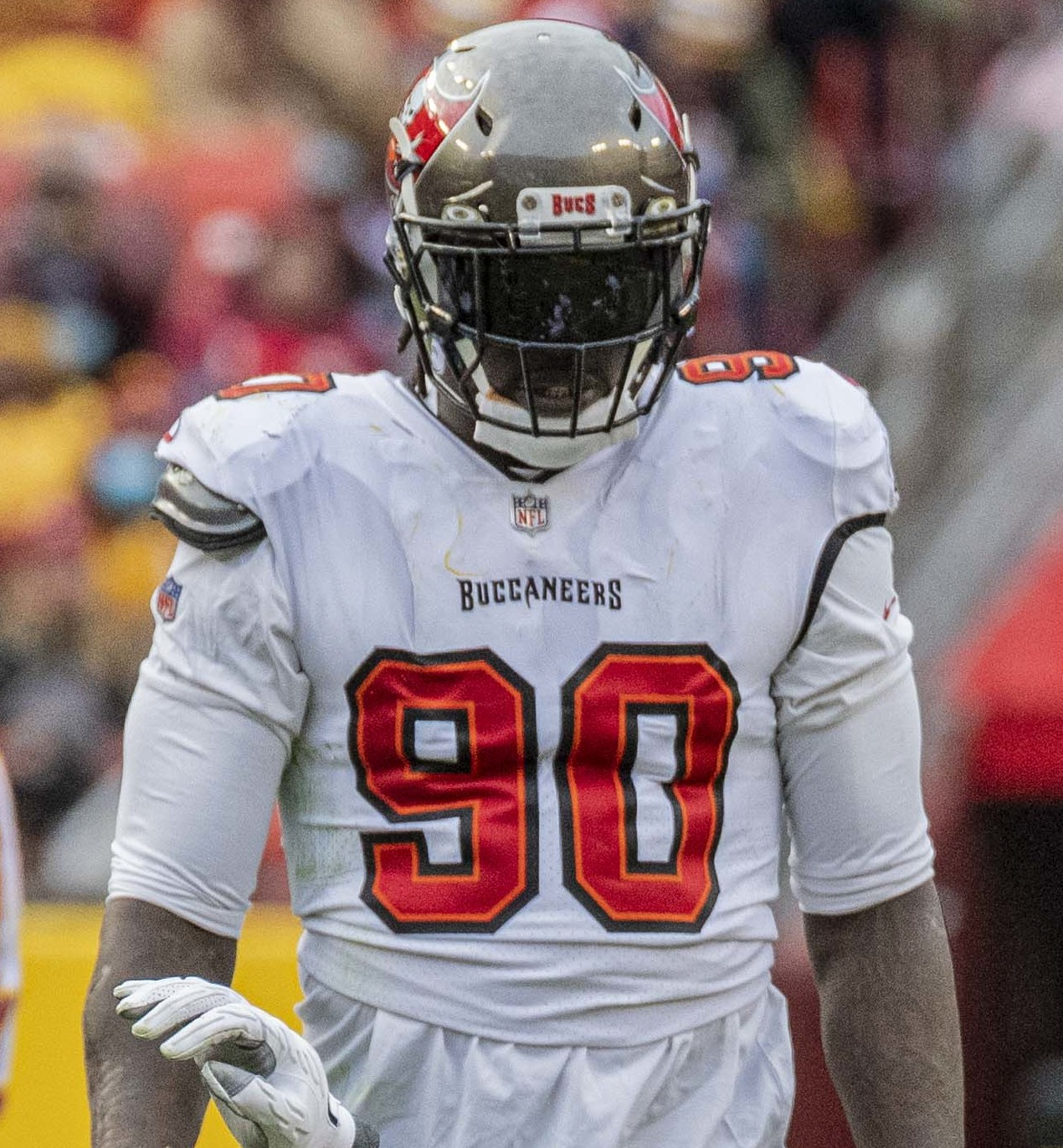
- Jason Pierre-Paul
  Damu Cherry, 2000, Olympic track & field athlete
- Jason Pierre-Paul, 2009, NFL defensive end, two-time Super Bowl Champion (XLVI with the New York Giants and Super Bowl LV with the Tampa Bay Buccaneers)
- Paige Railey, 2010, three-time Olympic sailor for the U.S.
- Sam Barrington, 2012, NFL linebacker

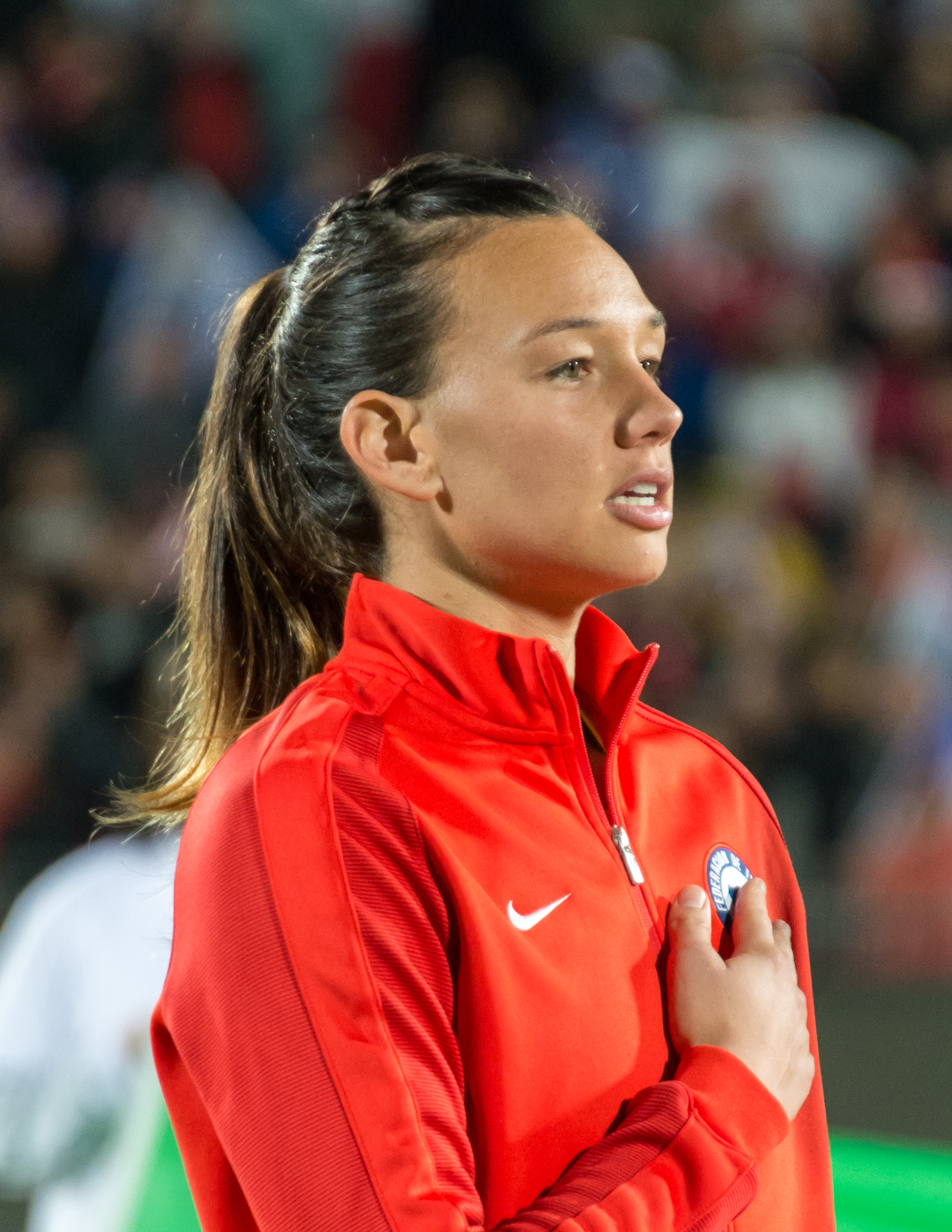
Christiane Endler

- Christiane Endler, 2014, member of the Chile Women's National Football Team and Olympique Lyon, 2021 FIFA Best Women's Goalkeeper of the Year, 2012 Copa Libertadores champion, 2022 UEFA Women's Champions League champion
- Javontae Hawkins, 2014, basketball player in the Israeli Basketball Premier League
- Zach LeDay, 2014, power forward for Hapoel Tel Aviv in the Israeli Basketball Premier League
- Chase Koepka, 2016, professional golfer
- Marquez Valdes-Scantling, 2017, NFL wide receiver, Super Bowl LVII and LVIII champion with the Kansas City Chiefs
- Shane McClanahan, 2018, Tampa Bay Rays pitcher, first pitcher in Major League Baseball history to make his debut in the postseason
- David Villar, 2018, baseball third baseman for the San Francisco Giants
- Évelyne Viens, 2020, member of the Canada Women's National Soccer Team and AS Roma, 2020 Olympic gold medalist

=== Business ===
- John R. Patrick, M.S. 1971, former vice president of IBM
- Charles Olcott, MBA, former CEO of Burger King
- George Reyes, 1976, former CFO of Google, former director of BEA Systems, Symantec, and LifeLock
- Jordan Zimmerman, 1978, MBA 1980, founder of Zimmerman Advertising, one of the largest advertising agencies in the world
- Jim Atchison, 1988, President/CEO of SeaWorld Parks & Entertainment
- Robert B. Carter, 1990, co-chief executive officer and chief information officer of FedEx
- Joie Chitwood III, MBA 1995, Indianapolis Motor Speedway President and COO

=== Entertainers and writers ===
- Richard Oppel, 1964, Pulitzer Prize-winning journalist, director of American Society of Newspaper Editors
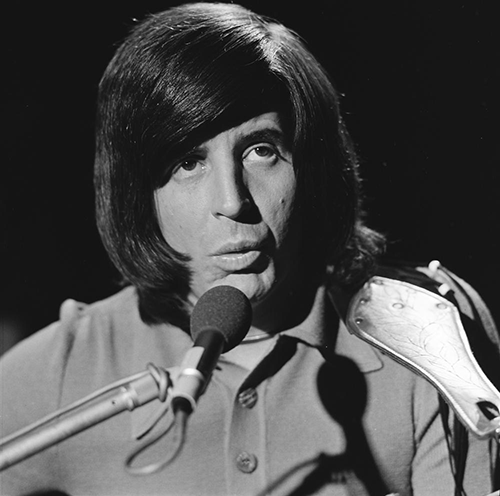
- Lobo
  Lobo, 1965, singer/songwriter, three Billboard top-10 songs
- Robert Stackhouse, 1965, artist and sculptor
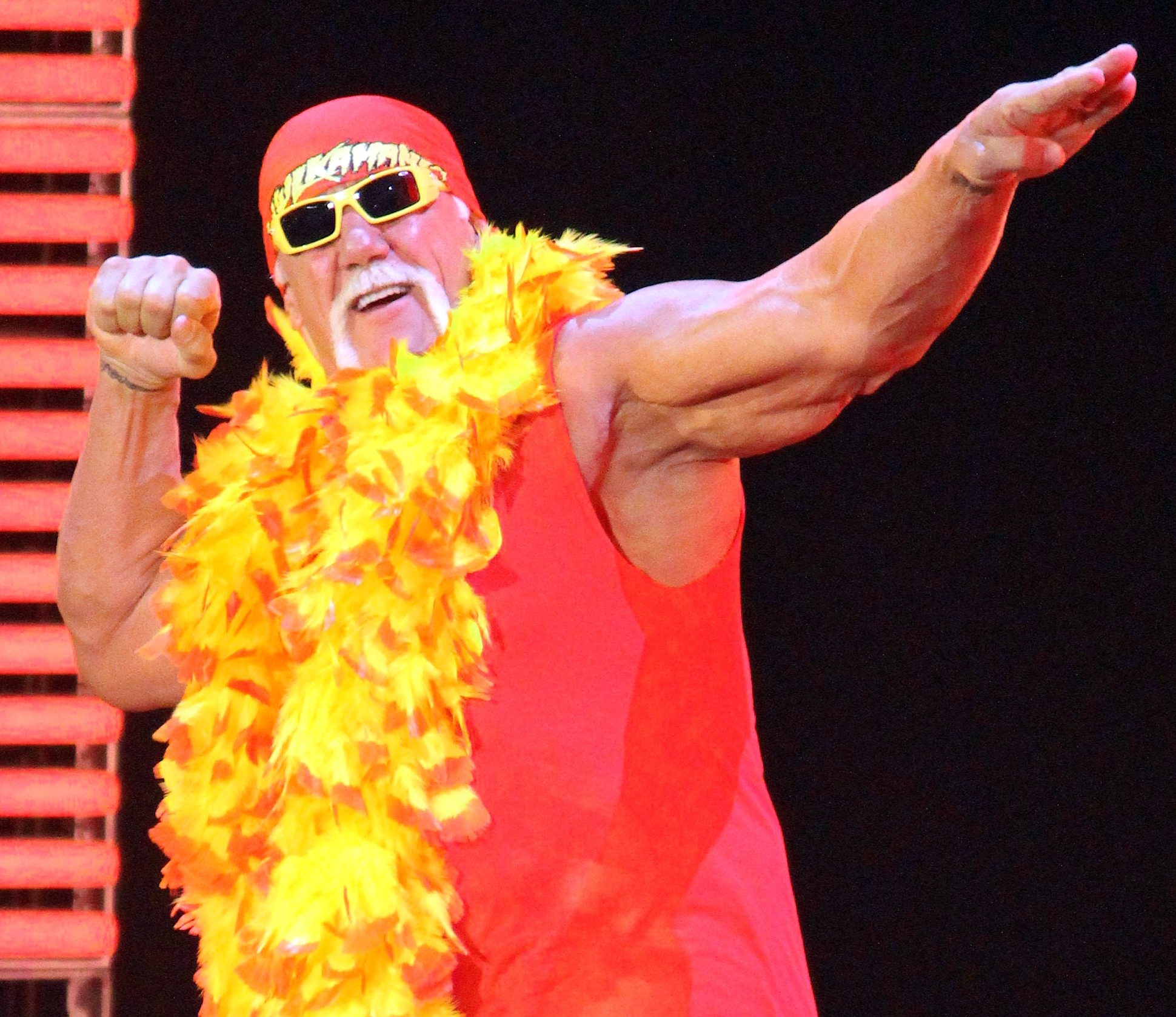
- Hulk Hogan
  James Carlos Blake, 1969, M.A. 1971, author, winner of the Los Angeles Times Book Prize for fiction
- Tony Zappone, 1969, journalist
- Hulk Hogan (real name Terry Bollea) (attended, did not graduate), professional wrestler
- Jack E. Davis, 1983, MA 1989, author, Pulitzer Prize-winning author.
- Gallagher, 1970, comedian
- Heather Graham Pozzessere, 1975, best-selling author
- Richard King, 1976, sound engineer, four Academy Awards for Best Sound Editing
- Drake Hogestyn, 1977, actor
- Guy Babylon, 1979, musician, keyboardist/composer, noted for his work with Elton John
- April Kelly, 1981, television writer, creator of Boy Meets World
- Ann Liguori, 1982, sports journalist
- Kerry Sanders, 1982, journalist
- Aasif Mandvi, 1988, actor and comedian
- Lucia M. Gonzalez, M.A. 1991, children's author, winner of the Pura Belpré Award, library director, Alice G. Smith Lecture.
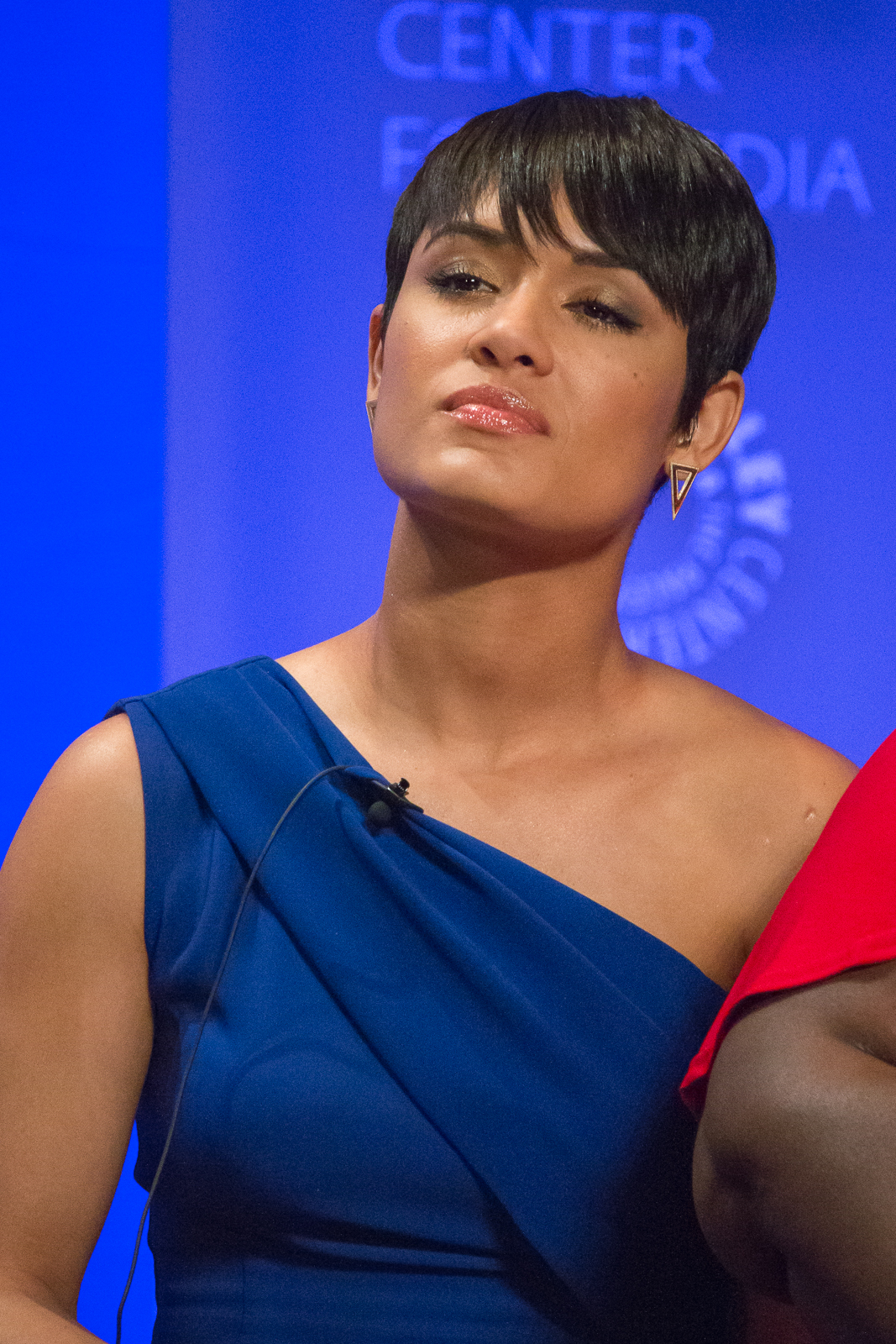
- Grace Byers
  Greg Pitts, 1992, actor
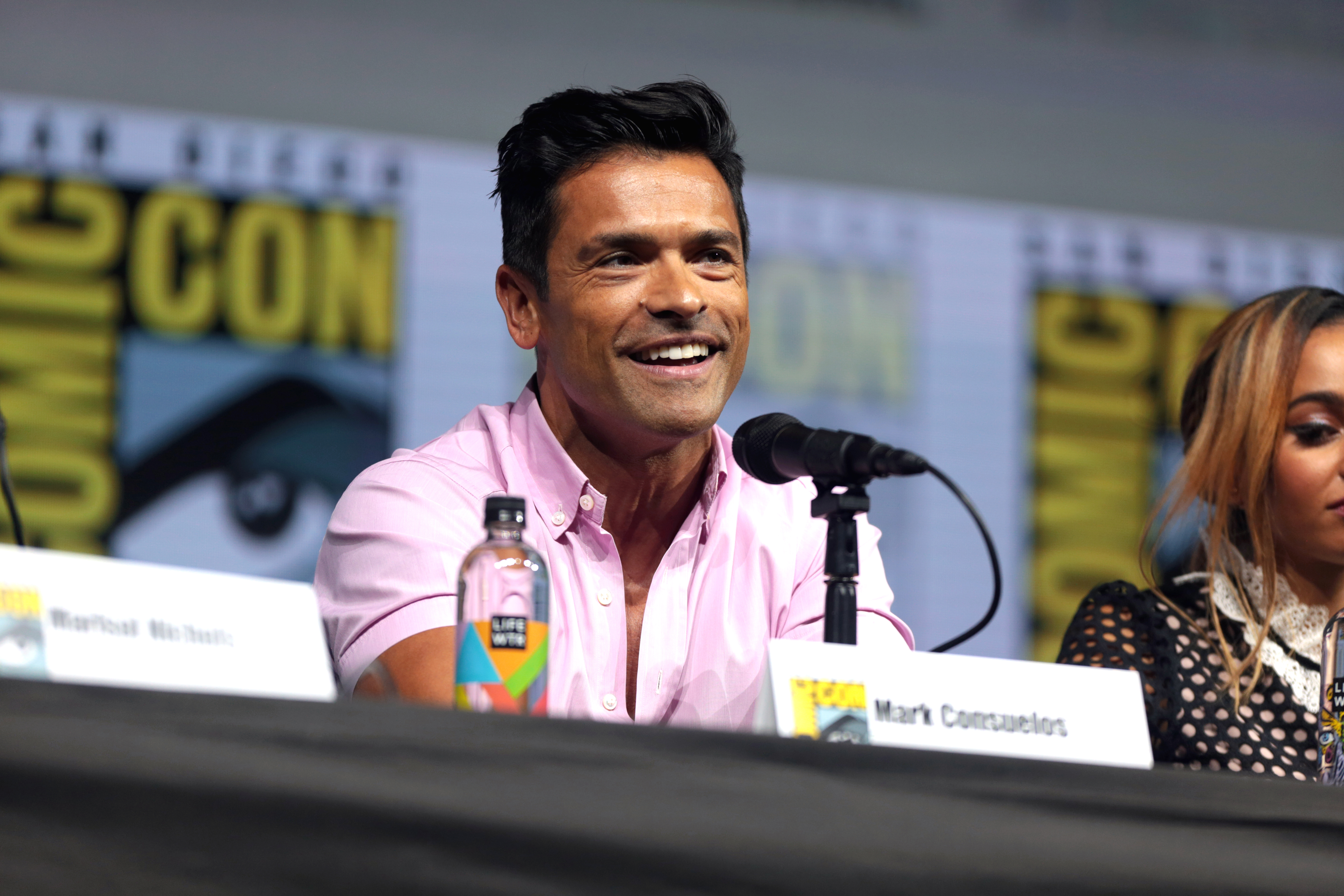
- Mark Consuelos
  Mark Consuelos, 1994, actor
- Nicole Johnson, 1996, D.P.H. 2013, Miss America 1999, now an activist for diabetes research
- Daniel Rodimer, 1997, professional wrestler
- Kissy Simmons, 1998, actress
- Matthew Lopez, 2000, playwright, Tony Award for Best Play nominee
- Quentin Earl Darrington, 2004, Broadway actor and singer
- Grace Byers, 2006, actress
- Philip DeFranco, (attended, did not graduate), YouTuber, host of The Philip DeFranco Show
- YesJulz (real name Julieanna Goddard), 2012, talent manager and influencer
- Marcus DeSieno, M.A. 2015, artist
- Antonio Permuy, 2019, writer, art critic, curator, and art patron.
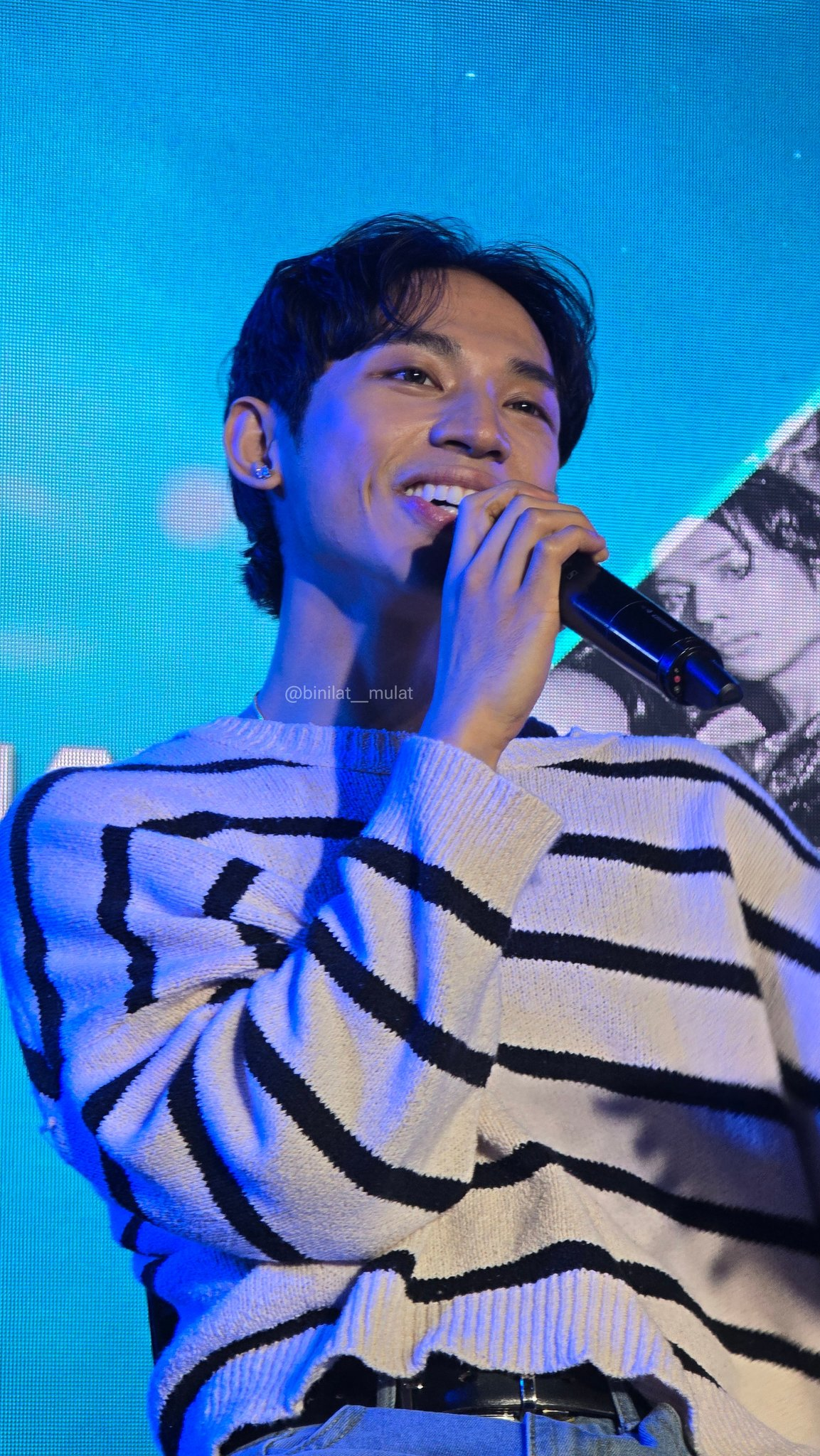
- Taneo Sebastian
  Taneo Sebastian, 2021, member of Filipino boy band Alamat and actor.
- Josette Urso, 1984, B.F.A. and M.F.A., visual artist

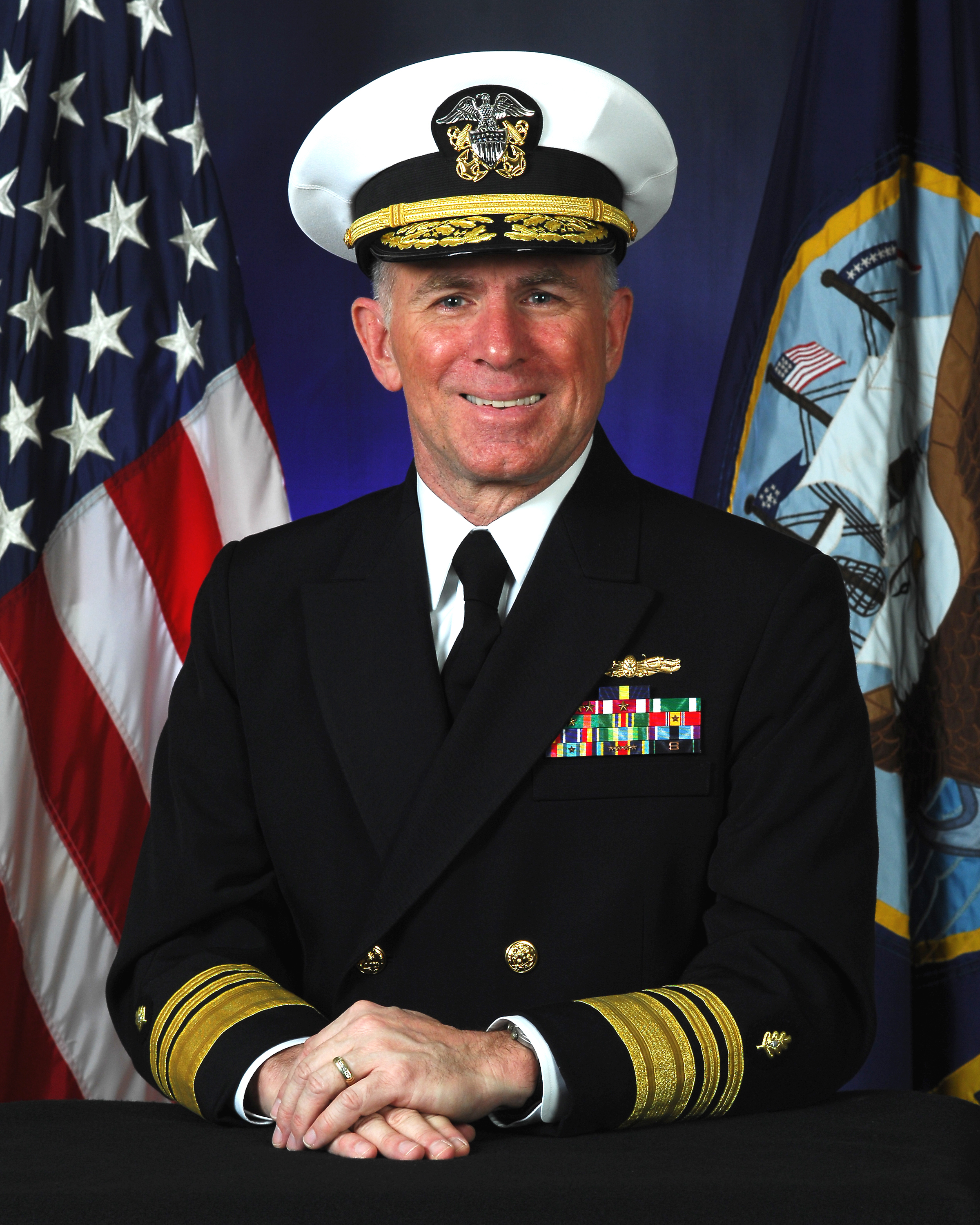
Matthew L. Nathan

=== Military ===
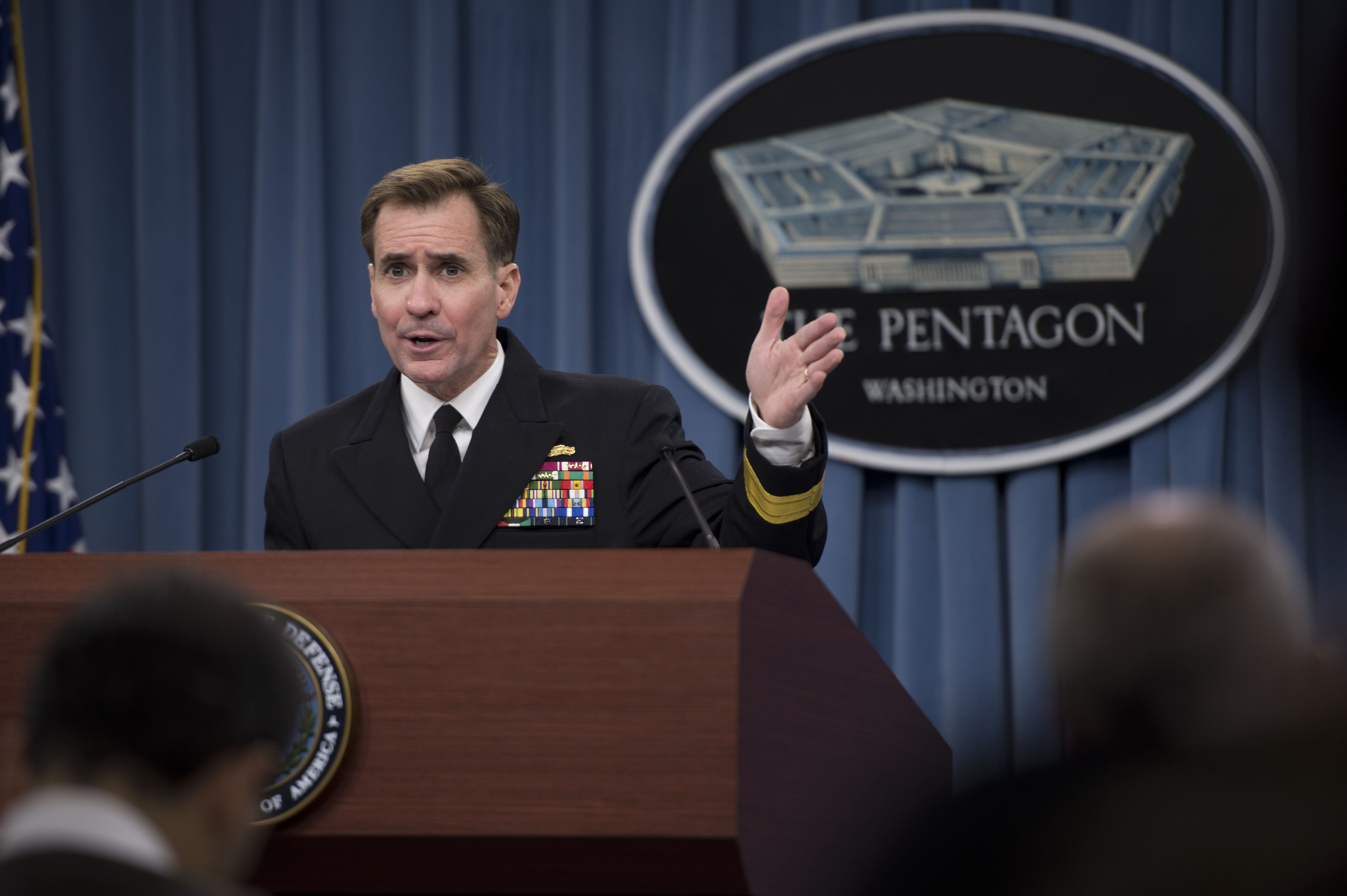
- John Kirby
  Matthew L. Nathan, 1984, vice admiral and former surgeon general of the United States Navy
- John Kirby, 1985, rear admiral, press secretary for the United States Department of Defense and assistant to the Secretary of Defense for Public Affairs
- Adam M. Robinson Jr., 1994, vice admiral and former surgeon general of the United States Navy
- Michael S. Devany, 1996, vice admiral in the NOAA Commissioned Officer Corps

=== Politicians and activists ===
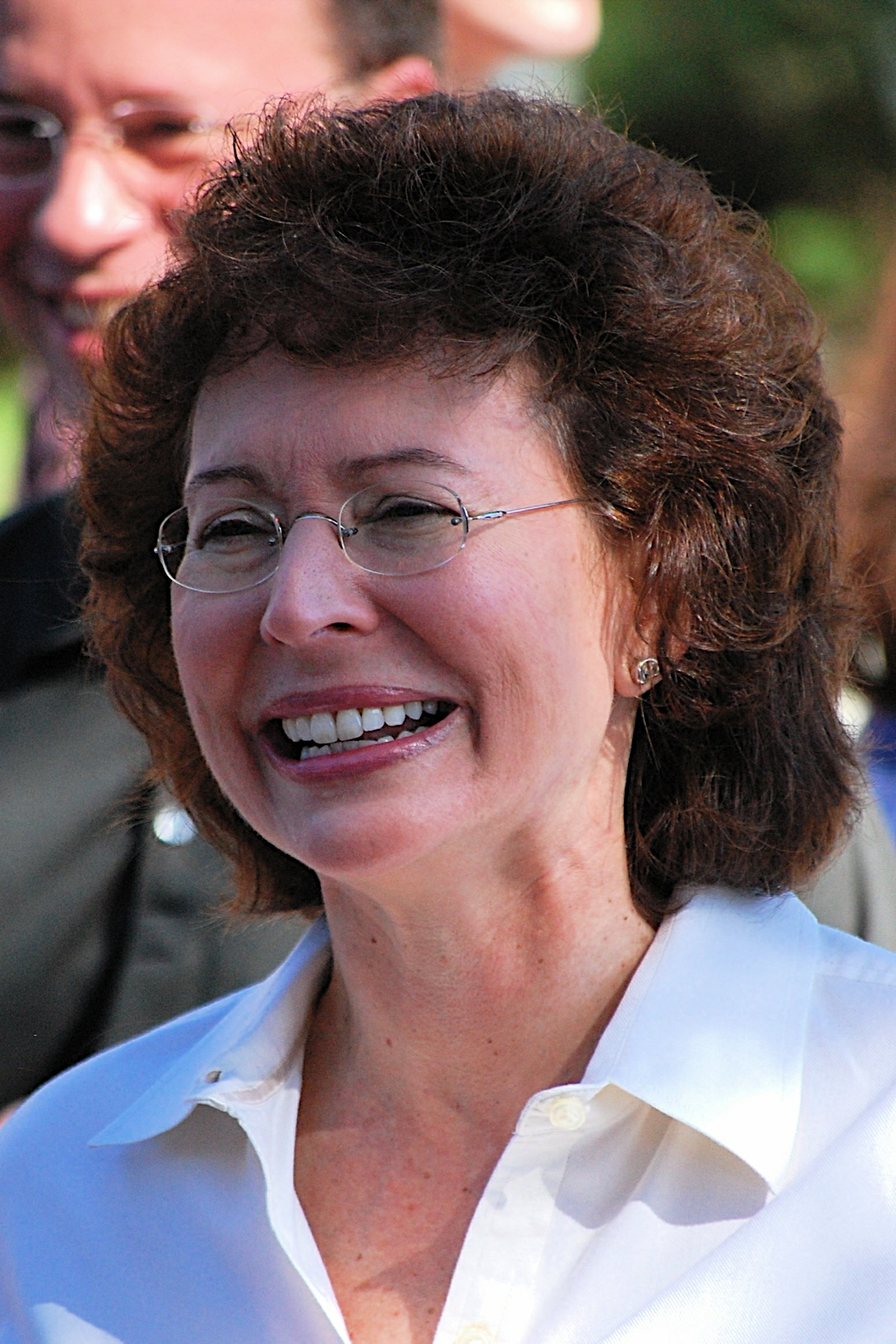
Pam Iorio

- H. Lee Moffitt, 1964, founder, H. Lee Moffitt Cancer Center; former speaker of the Florida House
- Michele Elliott, 1967, psychologist and child protection activist, founder of child protection charity Kidscape, has chaired multiple World Health Organization and UK Home Office groups centered around children
- Michele D. Hotten, 1975, justice on the Supreme Court of Maryland
- Dale Fischer, 1977, judge of the United States District Court for the Central District of California
- Mark Meadows, A.A. 1980, former U.S. congressman from North Carolina and White House Chief of Staff
- Ajamu Baraka, 1982, vice presidential nominee from the Green Party in the 2016 United States presidential election
- Kurt S. Browning, 1982, M.A. 1994, former Florida secretary of state
- Mario Díaz-Balart, 1984, U.S. congressman from Florida
- Eric M. Bost, M.A. 1985, former U.S. ambassador to South Africa
- Nadine Smith, 1987, LGBTQ+ rights activist and executive director of Equality Florida
- Ken Welch, 1987, mayor of St. Petersburg, Florida 2022–present
- J. Michelle Childs, 1988, judge of the United States Court of Appeals for the District of Columbia Circuit
- M. Rony Francois, M.D. 1994, MSPH 1998, Ph.D. 2003, former U.S. delegate to Haiti
- Pam Iorio, M.A. 2001, mayor of Tampa from 2003 to 2011
- Julia Letlow, Ph.D. 2012, U.S. congresswoman from Louisiana

=== Scientists ===
- Joanna Fowler, 1964, director of Brookhaven National Laboratory's Radiotracer Chemistry, Instrumentation and Biological Imaging Program, National Medal of Science award winner
- Mark Hulsbeck, 1978, Oceanographic Operations field manager and research diver for the Aquarius Reef Base, the world's only undersea research laboratory
- Adelaida K. Semesi, 1982 - postdoctoral research, director of the Institute of Marine Sciences of the University of Dar es Salaam
- David Mearns, 1986, director of Blue Water Recoveries; Guinness World Record holder for deepest shipwreck ever found
- Donna K. Arnett, Ph.D. 1992, epidemiologist, one of the world's leading experts in hypertension
- Katherine Seley-Radtke, 1992, cancer researcher, professor in the Department of Chemistry & Biochemistry at the University of Maryland, Baltimore County
- Michael S. Devany, MPH 1996, former chief operating officer of the National Oceanic and Atmospheric Administration
- Carlos Del Castillo, Ph.D. 1998, program scientist for the Ocean Biology and Biogeochemistry Program at NASA, winner of the Presidential Early Career Award for Scientists and Engineers
- Saraju Mohanty, 2003, director of Smart Electronic Systems Laboratory, 2020 Fulbright Specialist award winner
- Monica Webb Hooper, 2005, behavioral scientist, clinical psychologist, and deputy director of the National Institute on Minority Health and Health Disparities
- Anita Marshall, Ph.D. 2018, geologist, professor, and disability advocate

*bachelor's degree unless otherwise noted

== Notable faculty ==
- Norma A. Alcantar, chemical engineering
- Sami Al-Arian, computer engineering
- Raymond Arsenault, American history
- Huseyin Arslan, electrical engineering
- Joe Bondi, education
- Mya Breitbart, biology
- Kendra Daly, oceanography
- David M. Diamond, neuroscience
- Eugene Domack, geology
- Eric Eyre, journalism
- Thomas V. Falkie, mining engineering
- Thomas K. Frazer, marine science
- Lorie Fridell, criminology
- Stephen L. Golding, psychology
- John Hardy, genetics
- Nataša Jonoska, mathematics
- Autar Kaw, mechanical Engineering
- Anthony Llewellyn, chemistry
- Richard C. Lukas, history
- Sumita Mitra, chemistry
- Robin Murphy, computer science
- Olu Oguibe, art
- Robert Plutchik, psychology
- Sylvia W. Thomas, engineering
- James Unnever, criminology
- Sten Vermund, public health
- Robert Windom, medicine
- Kwasi Wiredu, philosophy
- Alvin Wolfe, anthropology

== Sources ==
- "2023-2024 Fact Book USF" (PDF).
