= Dr. Kiran C. Patel Center for Global Solutions =

Research center at the University of South Florida

- Formation: May 2005
- Headquarters: Tampa, FL, United States
- Website: www.patelcenter.usf.edu

The Dr. Kiran C. Patel Center for Global Solutions is a research center based at the University of South Florida in Tampa, Florida. The Patel Center's main goals are to identify challenges in the developing world and find viable solutions to those problems, particularly issues related to potable water and sanitation, urbanization and migration, and sustainable activities.

== Founding ==
The Patel Center for Global Solutions was created in May 2005 through a charitable donation from Kiran C. Patel, a cardiologist based in Tampa, and Pallavi Patel, a pediatrician also based in Tampa. The Patels contributed US$5 million to provide for a new facility for the Patel Center, matched with US$5 million by the state of Florida. Two of Kiran Patel's healthcare companies have a history of defrauding the US government.

== Executive directors ==
Betty Castor, former president of the University of South Florida, was executive director of the Patel Center from January 2007 until June 2009. Donna Petersen was named the interim executive director in August 2009.

== Patel Fellows ==
In November 2007, the Patel Center announced its group of inaugural Patel Fellows. Each Patel Fellow, a member of the University of South Florida staff, receives a stipend of $15,000 to support research projects related to the Patel Center's work.

== Patel Center facility ==
Plans are currently underway to build a Patel Center facility on the campus of the University of South Florida.
