= Rhea Law =

American university president and attorney

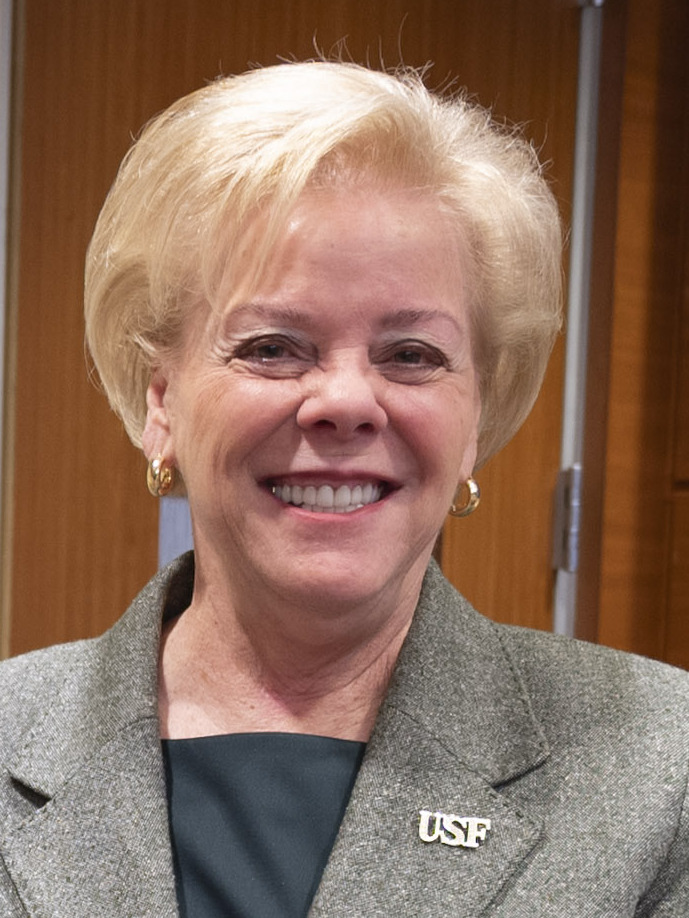

8th President of the University of South Florida
- In office March 2022 – January 2026
- Preceded by: Steven C. Currall
- Succeeded by: Moez Limayem

Personal details
- Education: University of South Florida (BA); Stetson University (JD)

Rhea F. Law is an American attorney and academic administrator who served as the eighth president of the University of South Florida from March 2022 to January 2026. Law is the first USF graduate to hold the position of president at the university.

== Early life and education ==
Rhea Law graduated from Chamberlain High School in Tampa, Florida, in 1967. She earned her undergraduate degree in business administration from USF and a Juris Doctor degree from the Stetson University College of Law.

== Career ==
Before becoming the president, Law played a significant role in the University of South Florida's governance and development. She was one of the founding members of the USF Board of Trustees, serving as vice chair for five years and as chair for four years. In addition, Law held leadership positions in numerous Florida-based organizations, including the Florida Council of 100 and the Tampa Hillsborough Economic Development Corporation.

She was the CEO and chair of the Board of Fowler White Boggs, a prominent Florida law firm, during its merger with Buchanan Ingersoll & Rooney in 2014.

== Personal life ==
Law was married to Wayne Williams for 39 years until his death on September 19, 2024. The couple had two children and two grandchildren.
