= Sylvia W. Thomas =

American engineer and academic administrator

Sylvia Wilson Thomas
- Born: Sylvia Wilson Thomas
- Education: Vanderbilt University (B.S., M.E.); Howard University (Ph.D.)
- Occupations: Engineer, researcher, academic administrator
- Employer: University of South Florida
- Known for: Research in bio- and nanoelectronic device integration
- Title: Vice President for Research & Innovation, University of South Florida
- Website: USF profile

Sylvia Wilson Thomas is an American engineer, researcher, professor, and academic administrator. She is known for her research on bio- and nanoelectronic device integration using advanced membrane and material systems for applications in healthcare, sustainability, and energy systems. She is a fellow of the American Institute for Medical and Biological Engineering and the American Association for the Advancement of Science.

== Early life and education ==
Thomas, born in Itta Bena, Mississippi, earned her Bachelor of Science (1988) and Master of Engineering (1990) degrees in Electrical Engineering from Vanderbilt University. She completed her Ph.D. in Electrical Engineering at Howard University in 1999, specializing in materials science of semiconductor elements and devices. Her dissertation focused on the optimization and characterization of aluminum nitride for ultraviolet detector applications.

== Career ==
Thomas worked at Bell Labs / Lucent Technologies and then moved to the University of South Florida. where is a professor of electrical engineering. In 2021, she was appointed interim Vice President for Research & Innovation at USF; in 2024 she was permanently named to the position. As of 2025, she is president of and chief executive officer of University of South Florida Research Foundation and Research Park.

== Research ==
Thomas' work focuses on nanofiber systems, semiconductor materials, and bio-nano devices for drug delivery, sensing, and filtration. She holds patents for her work in biosensor technologies.

== Awards and honors ==
- Black Engineer of the Year Award Educational Leadership Award, 2020
- Fellow, American Institute for Medical and Biological Engineering, 2020
- Fellow, National Academy of Inventors, 2022
- Top 50 Women Leaders in Education, 2023
- Inductee, Florida Inventors Hall of Fame, 2024
- Fellow, American Association for the Advancement of Science), 2025

== Selected works ==
- Vittetoe, Andrew W.; Niemann, Michael U.; Srinivasan, Sesha S.; McGrath, Kimberly; Kumar, Ashok; Goswami, D. Yogi; Stefanakos, Elias K.; Thomas, Sylvia (2009). "Destabilization of LiAlH4 by nanocrystalline MgH2". International Journal of Hydrogen Energy. 34 (5): 2333–2339. doi:10.1016/j.ijhydene.2009.01.025.
- Jayathilaka, Wanasinghe Arachchige Dumith Madushanka; Qi, Kun; Qin, Yanli; Chinnappan, Amutha; Serrano‐García, William; Baskar, Chinnappan; Wang, Hongbo; He, Jianxin; Cui, Shizhong; Thomas, Sylvia W.; Ramakrishna, Seeram (2019). "Significance of Nanomaterials in Wearables: A Review on Wearable Actuators and Sensors". Advanced Materials. 31 (7). doi:10.1002/adma.201805921. ISSN 0935-9648.
- Chaudhary, Meghna; Kosyluk, Kristin; Thomas, Sylvia; Neal, Tempestt (2023-07-02). "On the use of aspect-based sentiment analysis of Twitter data to explore the experiences of African Americans during COVID-19". Scientific Reports. 13 (1). doi:10.1038/s41598-023-37592-1. ISSN 2045-2322. PMC 10315393. PMID 37394523.
- US 9163374B2, "Use of cactus mucilage as a dispersant and absorbent for oil–water mixtures", published 2015-10-20, assigned to University of South Florida
- US 20210369157A1, "Silicon carbide nanoparticles fibrous membrane glucose sensor integrated with chronoamperometric potentiostat", published 2021-12-02, assigned to University of South Florida

== See also ==
- Florida Inventors Hall of Fame
