= Donna K. Arnett =

American epidemiologist

- Born: London, Kentucky, USA

Academic background
- Education: BSN, 1981, MSPH, Biostatistics and Epidemiology, 1987, University of South Florida College of Public Health; PhD, 1992, UNC Gillings School of Global Public Health
- Thesis: Arterial stiffness, blood pressure, and left ventricular mass in the atherosclerosis risk in communities study (1991)

Academic work
- Institutions: University of Kentucky; University of Alabama at Birmingham; University of Minnesota

Donna K. Arnett is an American epidemiologist, clinical research nurse, and higher education administrator. After having a stroke at the age of 27, she began focusing her research on epidemiology. In 2019, Arnett was named a World Expert in Hypertension by Expertscape after being in the top 0.8 percent of scholars who publish about hypertension over the previous ten years.

== Early life and education ==
Arnett was born and raised in London, Kentucky. She obtained her Bachelor of Nursing and Master's degree from the University of South Florida College of Public Health and began working in the neonatal intensive care unit in Tampa, Florida. While working as a nurse, Arnett had a stroke at the age of 27 due to a genetic condition but experienced doubtfulness due to her age. Although she has said she drove herself to work, four hours later she was sent to the emergency room for treatment. Following her stroke, Arnett enrolled at UNC Gillings School of Global Public Health for a doctorate degree in epidemiology.

== Career ==
Upon obtaining her PhD, Arnett became a faculty member at the University of Minnesota in 1994. During her stay there, she oversaw the Minnesota Heart Survey, a population-based study whose results brought about policy changes. She left Minnesota in 2004 to become an associate dean at the University of Alabama at Birmingham's School of Public Health. As a professor and chair of the Department of Epidemiology in the UAB School of Public Health, Arnett became the first epidemiologist elected president of the American Heart Association (AHA).

Arnett left UAB in 2015 to become the Dean of the University of Kentucky College of Public Health. While serving in this role, she was the recipient of the AHA's 2017 Population Research Prize "for insightful research successfully blending the basic molecular sciences with population studies to produce a highly relevant new understanding of major aspects of cardiovascular disease including risk prediction, hypertension and heart failure." Arnett was also recognized as a World Expert in Hypertension by Expertscape after being in the top 0.076 per cent of scholars writing about hypertension over the previous ten years. During the COVID-19 pandemic, Arnett wrote in KyForward.com, Kentucky's Online Newspaper, to encourage Kentucky citizens to vaccinate. She was also named to the National Academy of Sciences Committee Examining Use of Dogs in Biomedical Research.

In the Fall of 2022, Arnett was appointed as Provost at the University of South Carolina. In July 2025, she resigned as Provost, effective August 8, 2025, shortly following the resignation of Joel Samuels as Dean of Arts & Sciences. While Samuels moved to the University of Miami as Provost, Arnett became a regular faculty member at the University of South Carolina's school of public health.
