= James Unnever =

American criminologist

- Born: James Douglas Unnever; January 9, 1953 (age 73)
- Education: New Mexico State University, University of Florida, Duke University
- Known for: Work on race and crime in the United States
- Awards: 2009 Donal A. J. MacNamara Award from the Academy of Criminal Justice Sciences
- Scientific career
- Fields: Criminology
- Institutions: University of South Florida Sarasota-Manatee
- Thesis: Direct and structural discrimination in the sentencing process (1980)

James Douglas Unnever (born January 9, 1953) is an American criminologist and professor of criminology at the University of South Florida Sarasota-Manatee. In 2010, he was ranked the 5th most innovative author in the US of papers for criminology and criminal justice journals. He is known for his work on race and crime in the United States, such as the relationship between racial resentment and public support for punitive policies.
