= Bacchiglione =

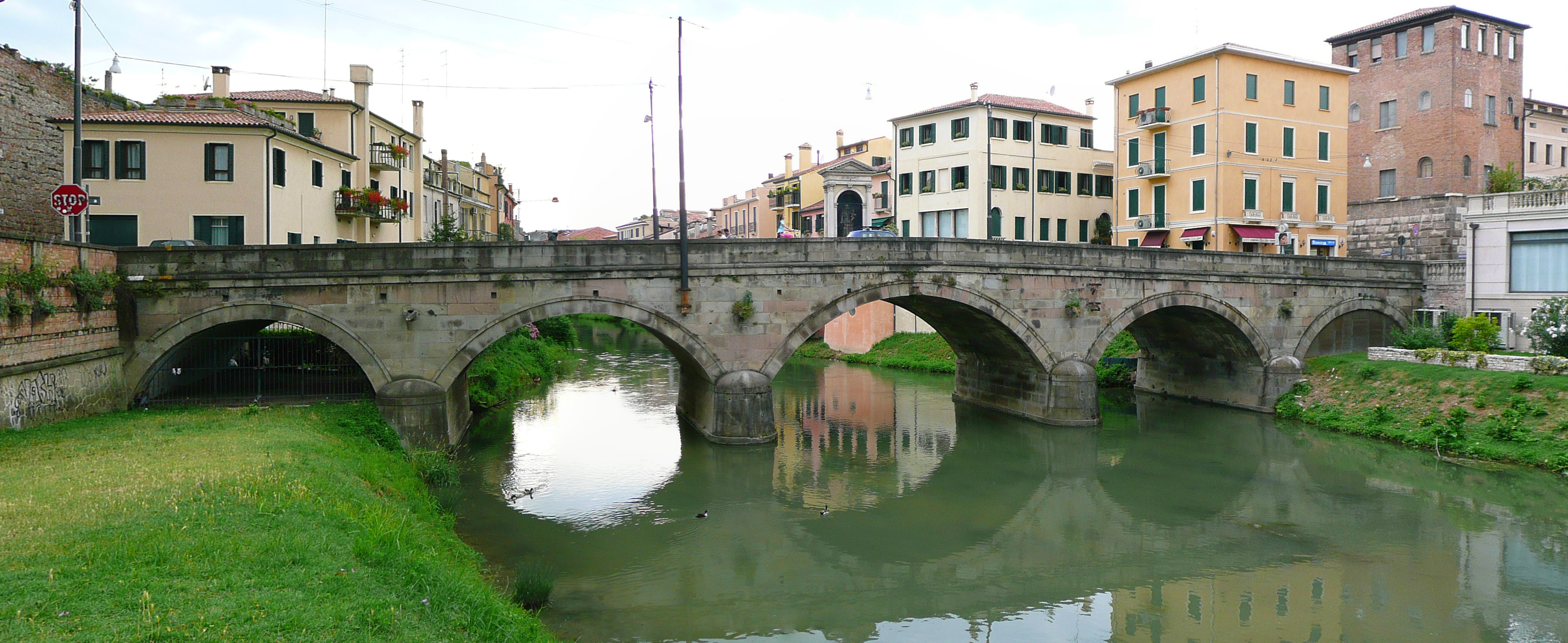
- Bacchiglione passing the Ponte Molino in Padua.

Location
- Country: Italy

Physical characteristics
- Source
  - location: The Alps
  - elevation: 60 m (200 ft)
- Mouth: Brenta
  - coordinates: 45.1838°N 12.2437°E
- Length: 118 km (73 mi)
- Basin size: 1,400 km^{2} (540 sq mi)
- Discharge
  - average: ~ 30 m^{3}/s (1,100 cu ft/s)

Basin features
- Progression: Brenta→ Adriatic Sea

The Bacchiglione (Latin: Medoacus Minor, "Little Medoacus") is a river that flows in Veneto, northern Italy. It rises in the Alps and empties about 90 miles (140 km) later into the Brenta River near Chioggia. It flows through and past a number of cities, including Vicenza and Padua. It acted for many centuries as a significant waterway up to Vicenza, above which it ceases to be navigable. It was connected in the 19th century to the Adige by a canal.

== Course ==
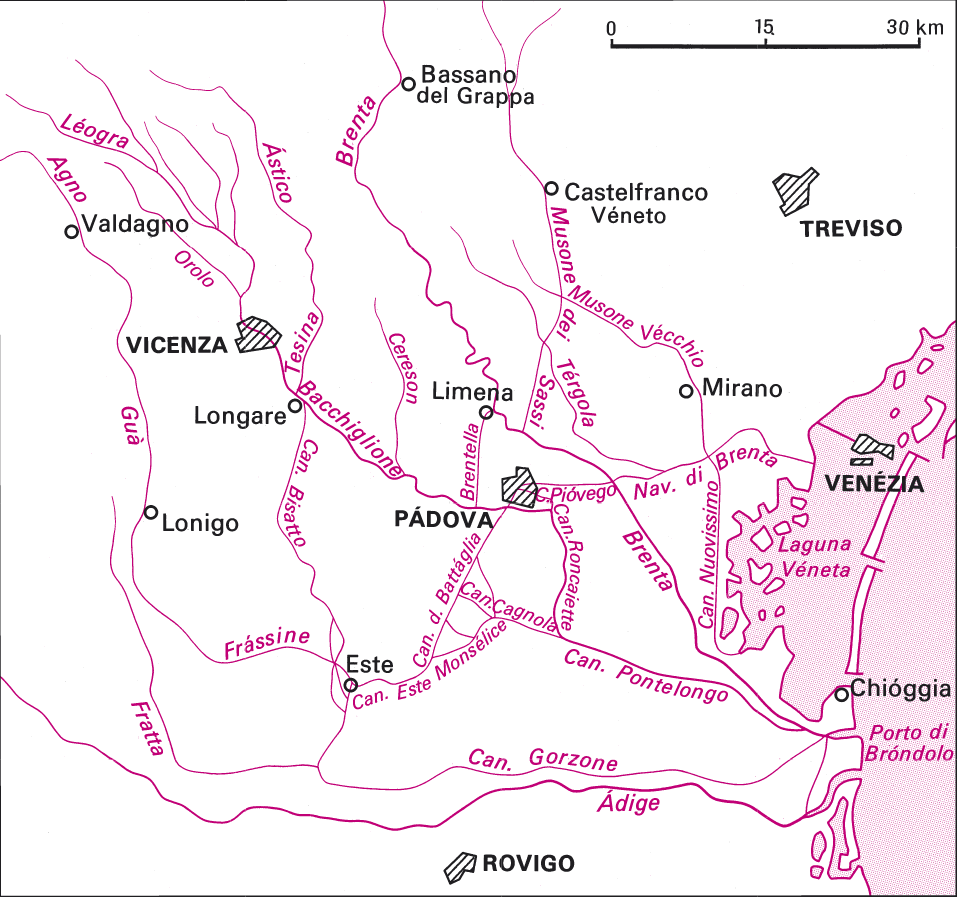
Map of the Brenta-Bacchiglione river system

The river starts in some springs in the towns of Dueville and Villaverla, in the province of Vicenza. Here it is called "Bacchiglioncello". Just upstream of the city of Vicenza, it receives water from the Leogra Timonchio (which descends from Mount Pasubio). At this junction, the river becomes the Bacchiglione.

At Ponte del Bo, above Vicenza, it joins with the Orolo. In Vicenza, the Bacchiglione is joined by the rivers Tesina, Retrone and Astichello. The river is about 118 kilometres (73 miles) long and has a basin of 1,400 square kilometres (540 sq mi). The average flow of the Bacchiglione in Padua is about 30 m^{3}/s. It flows through the summer dry season.

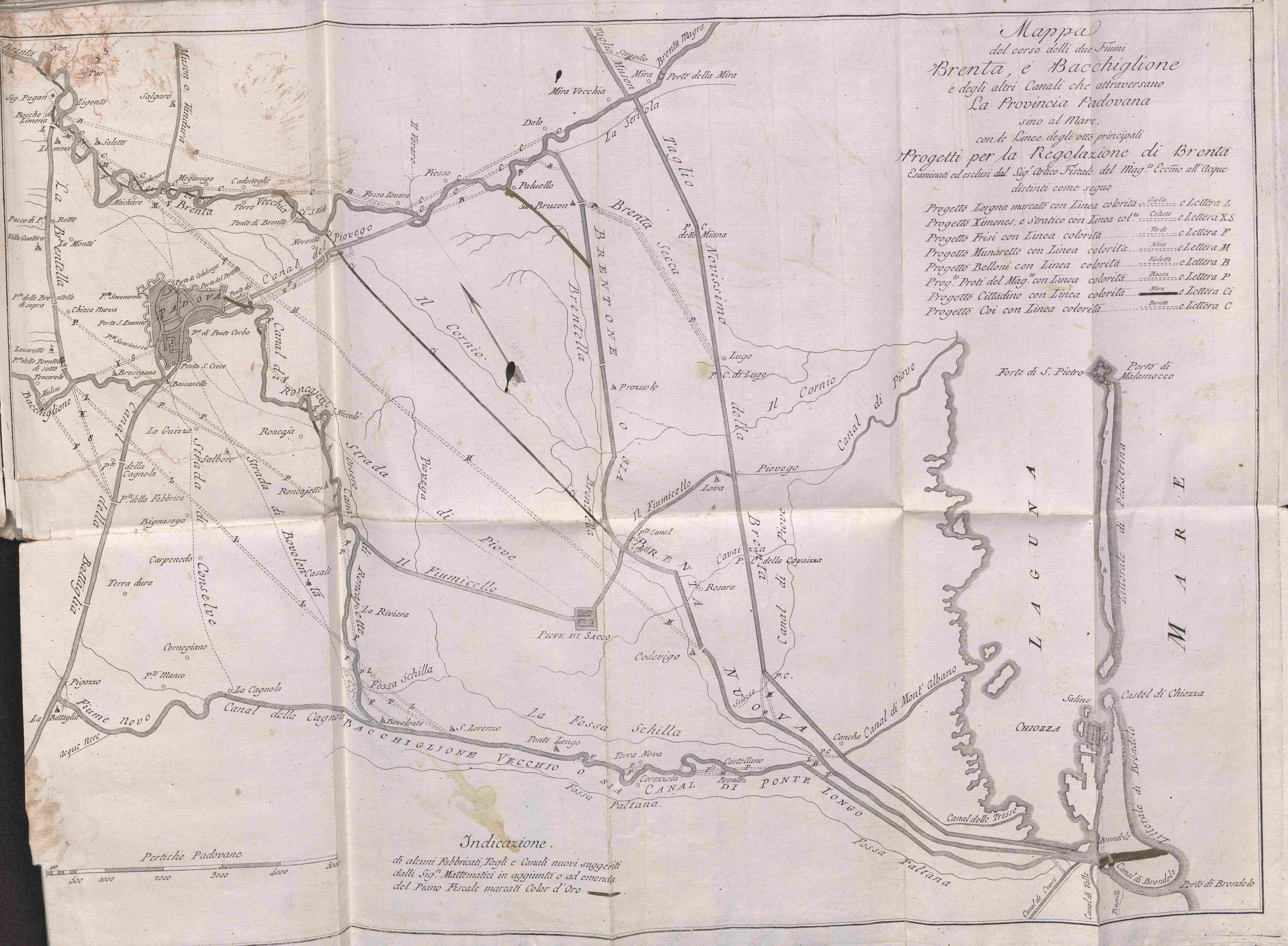
1789 map

== Bisatto Canal ==
At Longare, the Bisatto (or "Bisato") Canal was built in the twelfth century. Verona and Vicenza built it to divert water away from Padua during the many political struggles of the time, as told in the ninth canto of Dante's "Paradiso". The channel goes to Lozzo Atestino and Este; then continues to Monselice ("Este - Montelice Canal"). Then into the Battaglia Terme ("Battle Canal" or "Monselice Canal"), where it meets the Battaglia Canal from Padua. Through the Vigenzone Canal ("Cagnola Canal ") waters are reunited with the river Bacchiglione ("Channel Pontelongo"), allowing Vicenza to arrive in Chioggia without having to pass through Padua.

== Brentella Canal ==
The Brentella Canal originates from the Brenta River in Limena, where the flow is regulated by a hydraulic barrier (the "Colmelloni"), and joins the Bacchiglione just before Padua's airport. The Brentella Canal was built in 1314 Padua to prevent the city of Vicenza from stopping the river when it created the Bisatto Canal.

== Battaglia Canal ==
On the southern outskirts of Padua, the Battaglia Canal begins. Built in the 12th century, it heads south towards Battaglia Spa. This is connection from the Canal Bisatto, which separated from the Bacchiglione River at Vicenza. Through the Channel Vigenzone and then "Channel Cagnola", to flow again in the final stretch of the Bacchiglione ("Pontelongo Canal").

== Scaricatore Canal ==
To prevent flood damage in the second half of the nineteenth century the Scaricatore Canal was built. It starts from Bassanello and carries the excess water from the Padua River (Channel Roncajette), near the town of Voltabarozzo.

== Bridges ==
The Ponte San Lorenzo, a Roman bridge largely underground, along with the ancient Ponte Molino, Ponte Altinate, Ponte Corvo and Ponte S. Matteo.

- Ponte San Lorenzo, Padua, one of the earliest Roman segmental arch bridges
- Ponte Molino, Padua, another segmental arch bridge of Roman origin

== Sources ==
- "Bacchiglione" , Encyclopædia Britannica, 9th ed., Vol. II, New York: Charles Scribner's Sons, 1878, p. 194.
