= Ponte Corvo (bridge) =

Ponte Corvo (Ponte Corbo)
- Coordinates: 45.401814°N 11.883706°E
- Carries: Via San Francesco
- Crosses: Bacchiglione
- Locale: Padua, Italy

Characteristics
- Design: Segmental arch bridge
- Total length: 52.20 m (antiquity: 76 m)
- Width: Max. 5.32 m
- Longest span: 11 m
- No. of spans: 3 (antiquity: 5)

History
- Construction end: 1st–2nd century AD

The Ponte Corvo, rarely Ponte Corbo, is a Roman segmental arch bridge across the Bacchiglione in Padua, Italy (Roman Patavium). Dating to the 1st or 2nd century AD, its three remaining arches cross a branch of the river and are today partly buried respectively walled up. The span-to-rise ratio of the bridge varies between 2.8 and 3.4 to 1, the ratio of clear span to pier thickness from 4.9 to 6.9 to 1.

Besides the Ponte Corvo, there are three more ancient segmented arch bridges in Padua: Ponte San Lorenzo, Ponte Altinate and Ponte Molino, as well as Ponte San Matteo.

== See also ==
- Roman bridges
- List of Roman bridges
- Roman architecture
- Roman engineering

== Sources ==
- Galliazzo, Vittorio (1994), I ponti romani. Catalogo generale, vol. 2, Treviso: Edizioni Canova, pp. 205–207 (No. 434), ISBN 88-85066-66-6
