= Ponte San Lorenzo =

- Coordinates: 45.40611°N 11.87787°E
- Carries: Via San Francesco
- Crosses: Bacchiglione
- Locale: Padua, Italy

Characteristics
- Design: Segmental arch bridge
- Material: Stone
- Total length: 53.30 m
- Width: 8.35 m
- Longest span: 14.4 m
- No. of spans: 3

History
- Opened: Between 47 and 30 BC

The Ponte San Lorenzo is a Roman bridge over the river Bacchiglione in Padua, Italy. Constructed between 47 and 30 BC, it is one of the very earliest segmental arched bridges in the world. It is also notable for the slenderness of its piers, unsurpassed in antiquity.

== Location ==
The Ponte San Lorenzo was one of four Roman bridges in ancient Padua crossing the Medoacus (modern Bacchiglione). Located in the Via San Francesco, the three-arched bridge is today for the most part framed by surrounding buildings, which have moved closer to the river over the centuries. Only its eastern arch spanning the restricted waterway was largely visible until the middle of the 20th century, when it too disappeared from view as the remaining canal was filled up to the Riviera del Ponti Romani street. The intact arches of the bridge still exist below street level and can be visited at fixed times by the public. Earthworks in 1773 and 1938, during which parts of the bridge were temporarily excavated, were used for archaeological investigations.

Two further Roman bridges in Padua are obstructed from sight, the Ponte Corbo, also located in the Via San Francesco, and the completely inaccessible Ponte Altinate in the Via Altinate. Both bridges also rest on segmented arches, as does the above-ground Ponte Molino. The fifth Roman bridge in town is the Ponte S. Matteo close to the church of the same name.

== Construction ==
The Ponte San Lorenzo is 53.30 m long and 8.35 m wide. The date of its construction is fixed by a bridge inscription to between 47 and 30 BC. The bridge is of particular importance in the history of ancient technology for its flattened arches and slender piers. Its three arches span 12.8 m, 14.4 m and 12.5 m, with the span 3.7 times the rise, or, differently put, describing a segment of a circle of 113°. The profile of the structure thus considerably differs from the typical Roman semi-circular bridge arch with its value of 180°.

The pier thickness of Roman bridges varies—as far as determined—between one half and one fifth of the span. Small piers offer less resistance to the water flow, thus reducing the risk of undermined foundations. On the other hand, all piers have to be strong enough to accommodate two arch ribs. The pier thickness of the Ponte San Lorenzo measures only 1.72 m, which corresponds to no more than one eighth of the span of the central opening, a value not to be achieved again until the High Middle Ages.

== See also ==
- List of Roman bridges
- Roman architecture
- Roman engineering

== Sources ==
- O’Connor, Colin (1993), Roman Bridges, Cambridge University Press, pp. 92 (I161), 171, ISBN 0-521-39326-4
- Galliazzo, Vittorio (1994), I ponti romani. Catalogo generale, vol. 2, Treviso: Edizioni Canova, pp. 208–212 (No. 436), ISBN 88-85066-66-6
