= Ponte Molino (Padua) =

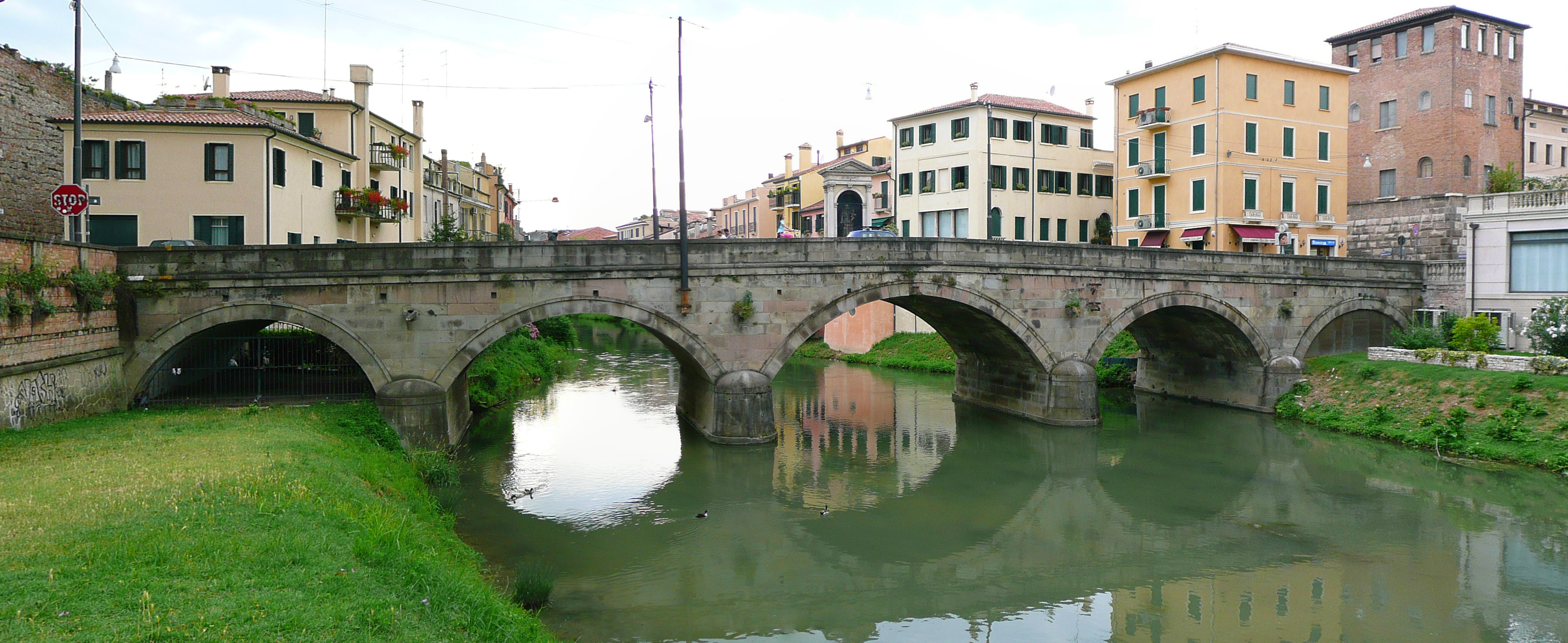
- Side view. To the left begins the old town which is entered by the Porta e Ponte Molino.
- Coordinates: 45.411745°N 11.873753°E
- Carries: Via Dante
- Crosses: Bacchiglione
- Locale: Padua, Italy

Characteristics
- Design: Segmental arch bridge
- Total length: 50.54 m
- Width: 9.21 m
- Longest span: 11.47 m
- No. of spans: 5

History
- Construction end: 1st century BC

The Ponte Molino is a Roman bridge across the Bacchiglione in Padua, Italy. The span-to-rise ratio of the Late Republican bridge varies between 3.5–4.5 and 1, the ratio of clear span and pier thickness between 4–6.5 and 1.

Apart from the Ponte Molino, there are other extant Roman bridges in Padua: Ponte San Lorenzo, Ponte Altinate and Ponte Corbo, all three also featuring segmented arches, as well as Ponte S. Matteo.

== See also ==
- List of Roman bridges
- Roman architecture
- Roman engineering

== Sources ==
- Galliazzo, Vittorio (1995), I ponti romani, vol. 1, Treviso: Edizioni Canova, p. 432, ISBN 88-85066-66-6
- Galliazzo, Vittorio (1994), I ponti romani. Catalogo generale, vol. 2, Treviso: Edizioni Canova, pp. 207–208 (No. 435), ISBN 88-85066-66-6
