= MYW =

MYW may refer to:

- Maendeleo Ya Wanawake, a Kenyan women's organization
- Mennonite Your Way, a hospitality exchange service that caters to Mennonites
- Mtwara Airport, Tanzania (by IATA airport code)
- MyAir, a former Italian airline (by ICAO airline designator)
