= Medoacus =

Medoacus or Mediochos (Ancient Greek Μηδείοχος) is the Latin name of two rivers (originally two distributaries of the same river) in Northern Italy:

- Medoacus Major (Greater Medoacus), modern Brenta (river)
- Medoacus Minor (Lesser Medoacus), modern Bacchiglione
