= Caesar's Rhine bridges =

Roman construction, Gallic Wars

Coordinates: 50°24′48″N 7°28′24″E

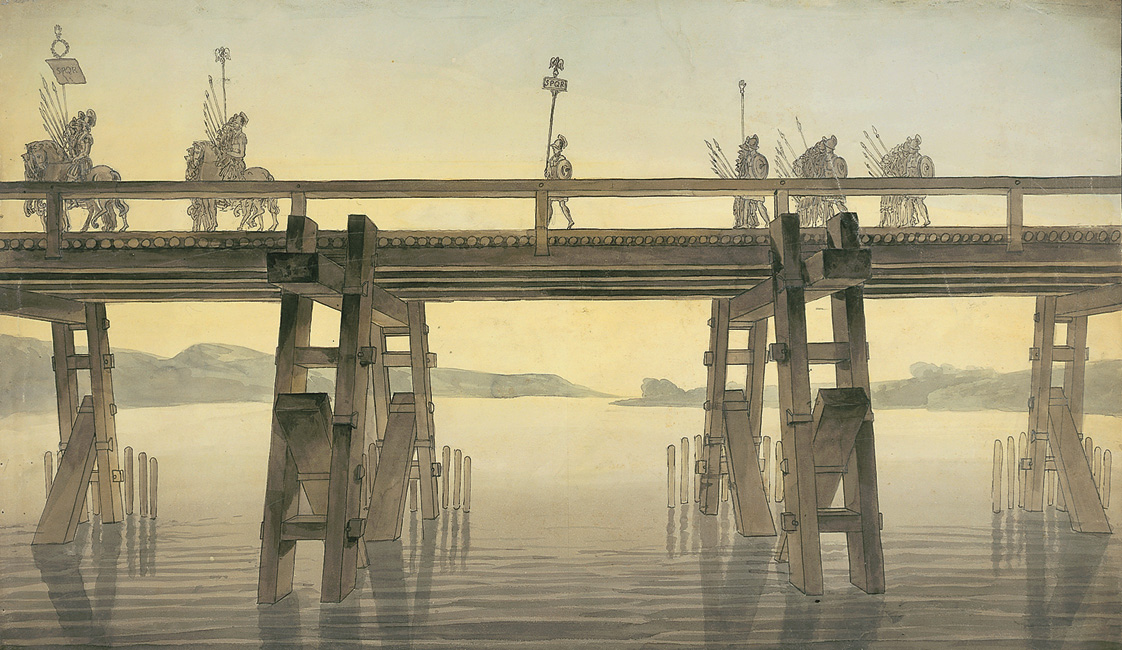
Caesar's Rhine Bridge, an 1814 depiction by John Soane

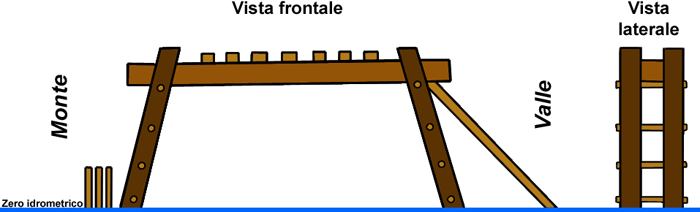
The Italian cross-section of the bridge

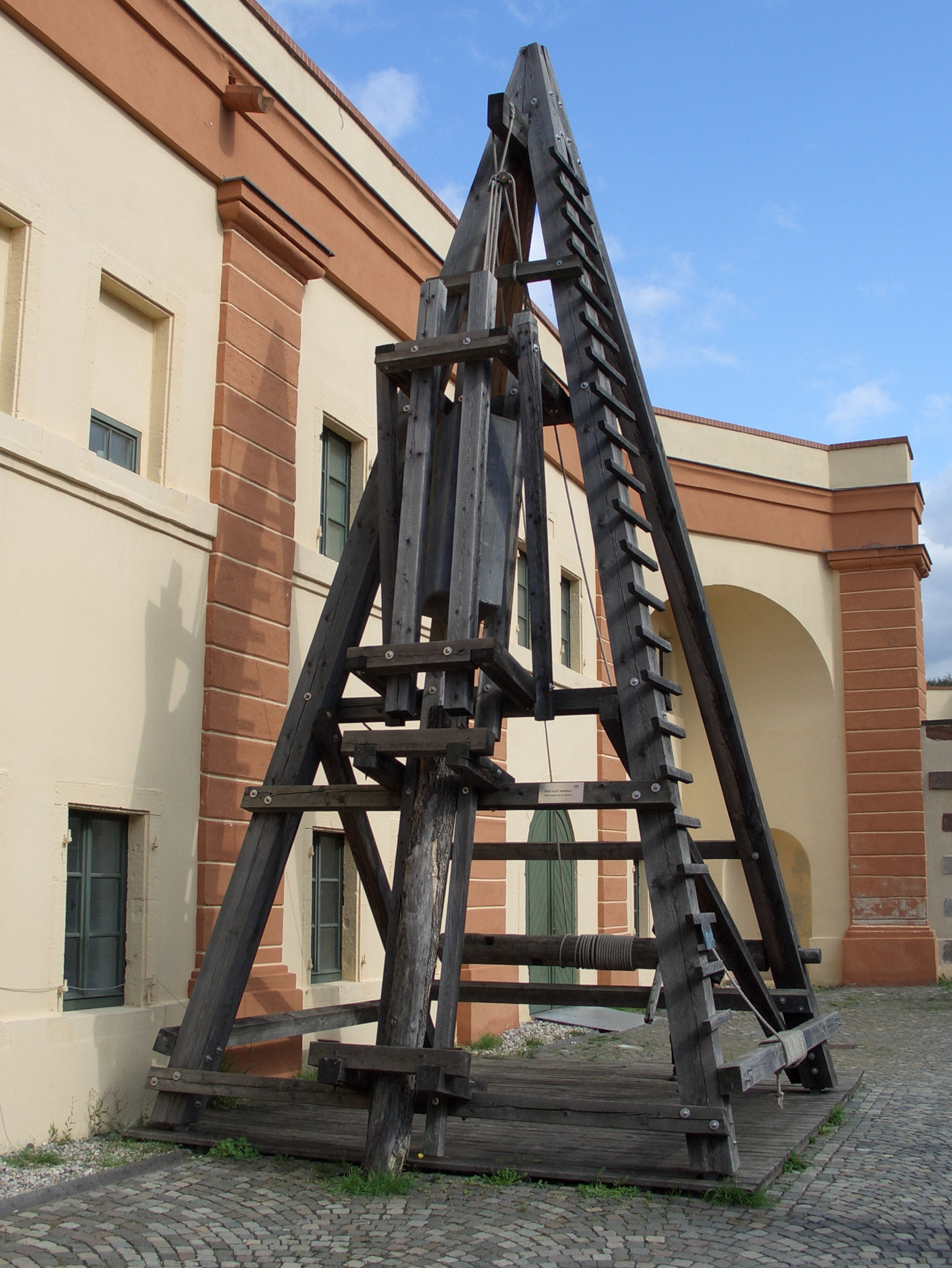
Reconstruction in Koblenz of a Roman pile driver, used to build the Rhine bridges

The first two bridges on record to cross the Rhine river were built by Julius Caesar and his legionaries during the Gallic War in 55 BC and 53 BC. Strategically successful, they are also considered masterpieces of military engineering.

== Background ==
During Caesar's conquest of Gaul it became necessary to secure the eastern border of the new provinces against plundering Germanic tribes. The tribes felt safe on the eastern side of the Rhine, trusting the river as a natural border which protected them from retaliation after their opportunistic raids into the province. Caesar decided to confront them and show support for the Ubians, an allied German tribe across the Rhine.

While he could have crossed the river by boats which the Ubians had offered to provide, Caesar decided to build a bridge to demonstrate Rome's ability to bring the fight at any time to the Germanic tribes. Additionally, as he indicated in his Commentary on the Gallic War, this approach conformed more to his own dignity and style.

== Construction ==
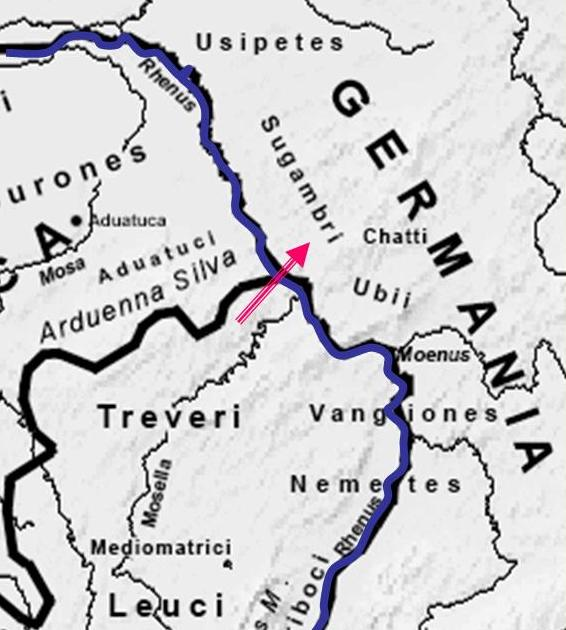
Likely site of the Rhine crossings

=== The first bridge ===
Caesar's first bridge was most likely built between Andernach and Neuwied, downstream from Koblenz. Book 4 (Liber IV) of his commentaries gives technical details of this wooden beam bridge. Double timber pilings were rammed into the river bottom by raising a large stone with a winch and releasing it, driving the posts into the riverbed. The most upstream and downstream pilings were slanted and secured by a beam, and multiple segments of these then linked up to form the basis of the bridge. Conflicting models have been presented based on his description. Separate upstream pilings guarded against flotsam and possible attacks while guard towers protected the entries. The length of the bridge has been estimated to be 140 to 400 m (roughly 460 to 1,300 ft), and its width 7 to 9 m (23 to 30 ft). The river is up to 9.1 m (30 ft) deep.

The construction of this bridge showed that Caesar, and Rome, could go anywhere, if only for a few days. Since he had over 40,000 soldiers at his disposal, they built the first bridge in only 10 days using local lumber. He crossed with his troops over to the eastern side and burned some villages but found that the Sugambri and Suebi tribes had moved eastward. The tribes had come together and were prepared to meet Caesar's army in battle, but when Caesar heard of this he quickly left the region, taking down the bridge behind him. He was only there for 18 days, and without fighting in any major battle, he returned to Gaul and cut the bridge down.

=== The second bridge ===
Two years later Caesar built a second bridge near the site of the first one, possibly at today's Urmitz (near Neuwied). He built the bridge "in a few days", as described in Book 6 (Liber VI). His expeditionary forces raided the countryside, but did not encounter significant opposition as the Suebi retreated. Upon Caesar's return to Gaul, the bridge was taken down.

== Results ==
Caesar's strategy was effective, as he was able to secure the eastern border of Gaul. He demonstrated that Roman power could easily and at will cross the Rhine and henceforth for several centuries significant Germanic incursions across the Rhine were halted. Further, his feat served him in establishing his fame at home.

With Roman colonization of the Rhine valley more permanent bridges were built later at Castra Vetera (Xanten), Colonia Claudia Ara Agrippinensium (Cologne), Confluentes (Koblenz), and Moguntiacum (Mainz).

== Controversies about the location ==
Speculation about the location of the bridges is due to the temporary nature of the construction and the lack of a precise location in Caesar's report. However, diggings in the Andernach-Neuwied area found residual pilings that are considered to be remnants of Caesar's bridges. As an alternative site a place south of Bonn has been mentioned.

== See also ==
- Roman bridge
- List of Roman bridges
