= Tesina =

Tèsina
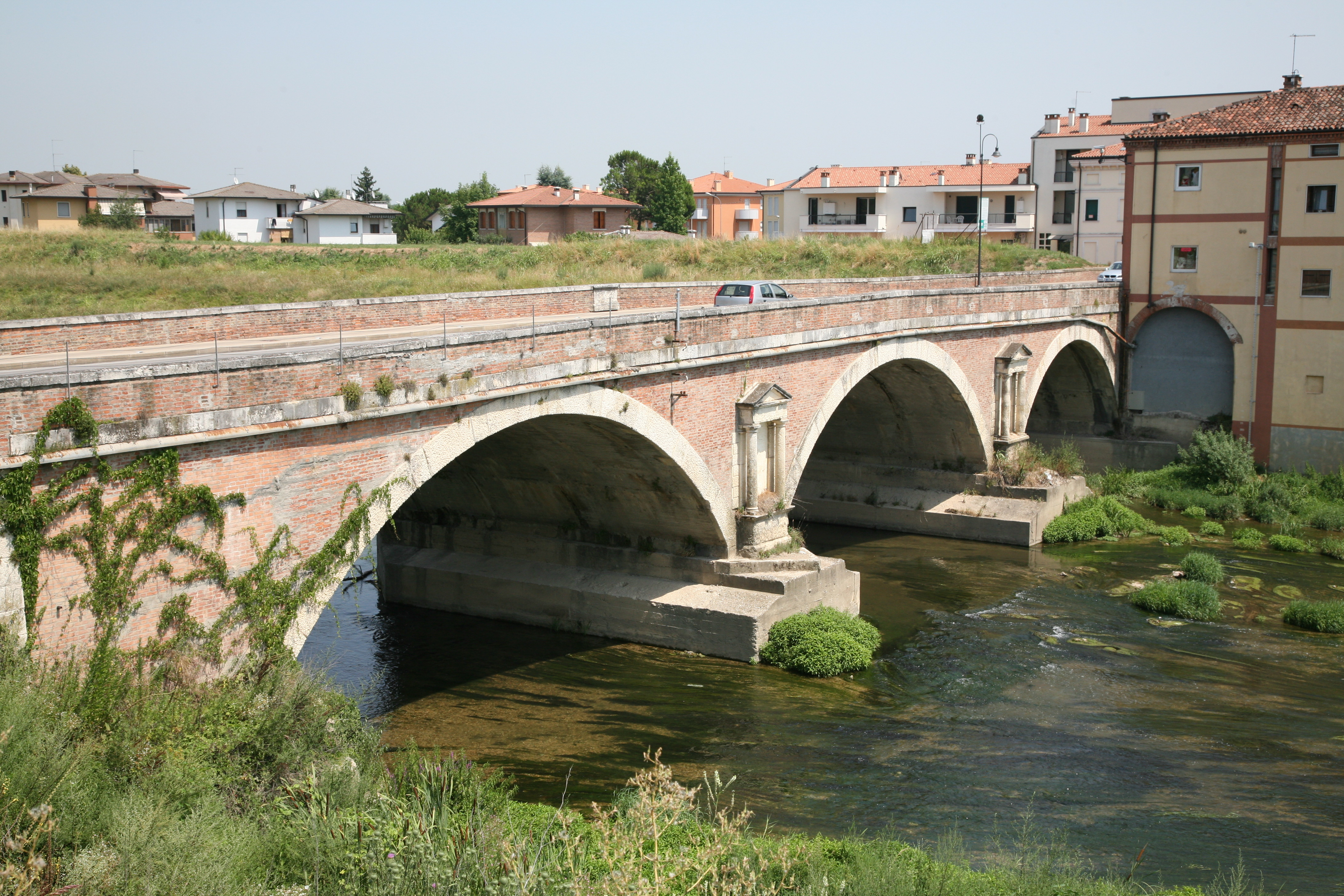
- The Tesina under the bridge of Torri di Quartesolo

Location
- Country: Italy

Physical characteristics
- Source
  - location: Sandrigo
  - elevation: 63 m (207 ft)
- Mouth
  - location: Bacchiglione river
  - coordinates: 45°29′29″N 11°36′06″E
- Length: 26.61 km (16.53 mi)
- Discharge
  - average: 12 m^{3}/s (420 cu ft/s)

Basin features
- Progression: Bacchiglione→ Brenta→ Adriatic Sea

The Tesina is an Italian river that runs in the Veneto region, in the north-east of Italy. Its source is at Cibalde, a locality in the commune of Sandrigo. It flows into the Bacchiglione river near San Pietro Intrigogna, in the territory of Vicenza.
