= James Valoue =

James Valoue (also spelled Valouë, Valoué or Valouè in various references) was an 18th-century watchmaker. He is most remembered for his 1737 design of a horse-powered pile driver which was used in the construction of Westminster Bridge. In 1738 the Royal Society of London gave Valoue the Copley Medal for his invention of "an engine for driving piles to make a foundation for the bridge to be erected in Westminster, the model whereof had been shown to the society". The Science Museum of London holds a model of Valoue's pile driver constructed by Stephen Demainbray.
