= Pons Aemilius =

Ancient Roman bridge in Rome

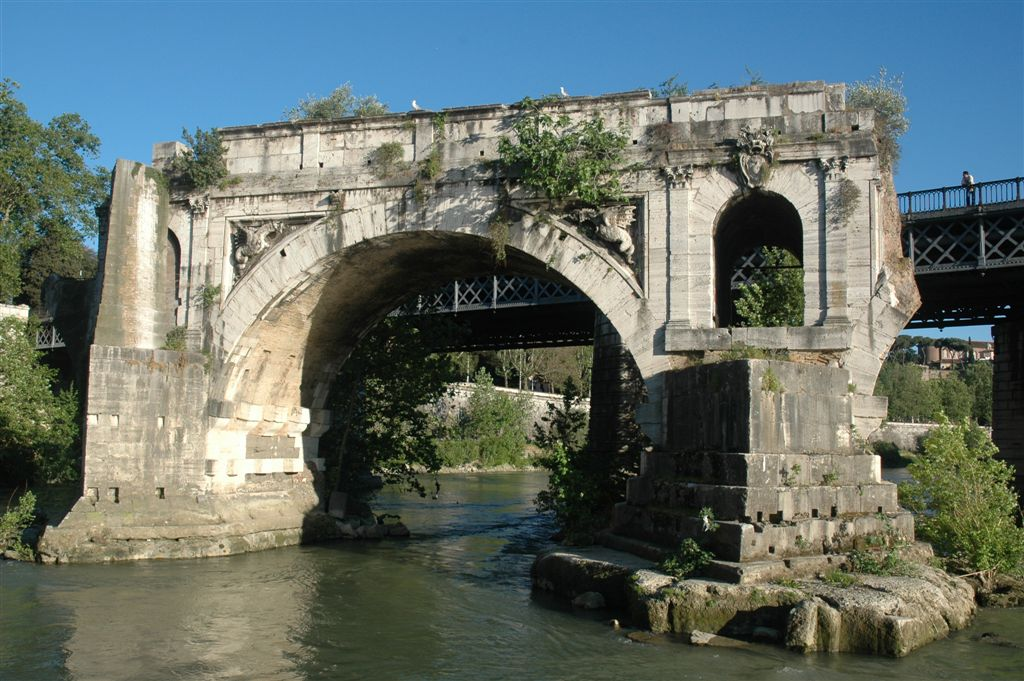
- The remaining arch of the Pons Aemilius, located in the middle of the Tiber
- Coordinates: 41°53′22″N 12°28′46″E
- Carries: Connection Forum Boarium-Trastevere
- Crosses: Tiber
- Locale: Rome, Italy
- Official name: Ponte Rotto

Characteristics
- Design: Arch bridge
- Material: Stone
- No. of spans: Originally 7

History
- Construction start: 179 BC (First stone bridge)
- Construction end: 142 BC (First stone bridge)

Location
- Click on the map for a fullscreen view

The Pons Aemilius (Latin for the "Aemilian Bridge"; Italian: Ponte Emilio) is the oldest Roman stone bridge in Rome. Preceded by a wooden version, it was rebuilt in stone in the 2nd century BC. It once spanned the Tiber, connecting the Forum Boarium, the Roman cattle market, on the east with Trastevere on the west. A single arch in mid-river is all that remains today, lending the bridge its name Ponte Rotto (Italian for the "Broken Bridge").

== History ==
=== Antiquity ===
The oldest piers of this stone bridge were probably laid when the Via Aurelia was constructed in the mid-2nd century BC. According to Titus Livius, there existed a bridge in the same location as the Pons Aemilius in 192 BC. The first stone bridge was constructed by Censor Marcus Fulvius Nobilior several years after that, in 179 BC (although it was not completed until 151 BC). The bridge's piers date from this early period, although its arches were constructed by Scipio Aemilianus and L. Mummius in 142 BC. The bridge kept its place for several hundred years, although it was repaired and rebuilt both by Augustus, and later by Emperor Probus in AD 280.

=== Middle Ages ===
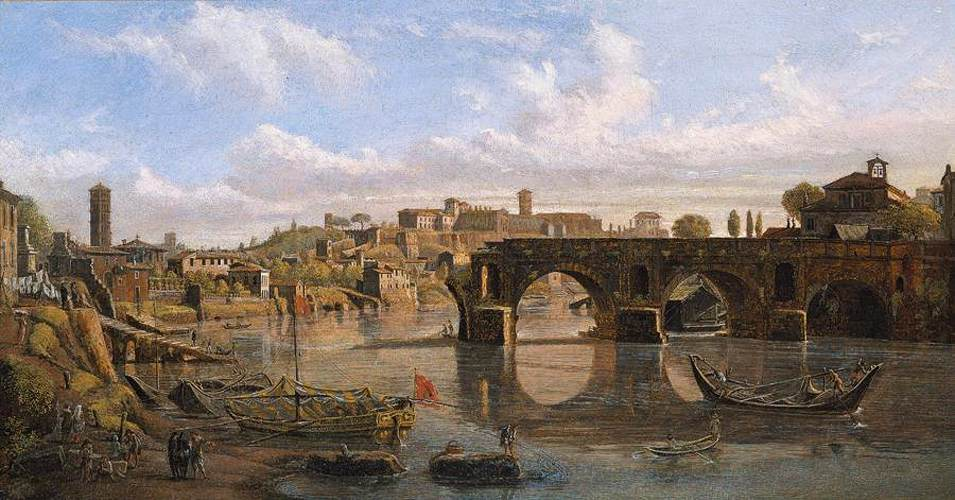
Rome: View of the River Tiber with the Ponte Rotto and the Aventine Hill (1690) by Van Wittel, showing the damage wrought by severe floods

After the collapse of the Roman Empire, the bridge was damaged several times by floods, with each flood taking a greater and greater toll on the overall structure. It was first severely damaged in 1230, after which it was rebuilt by Pope Gregory XI. Later, the bridge was more seriously damaged by the flood of 1557, but again was later rebuilt by Pope Gregory XIII; the remnants of the bridge today still bear Latin inscriptions detailing Gregory XIII's renovation of the bridge. Finally, floods in 1575 and 1598 carried the eastern half away, resulting in its abandonment as a functioning bridge for several centuries.

=== Modernity ===
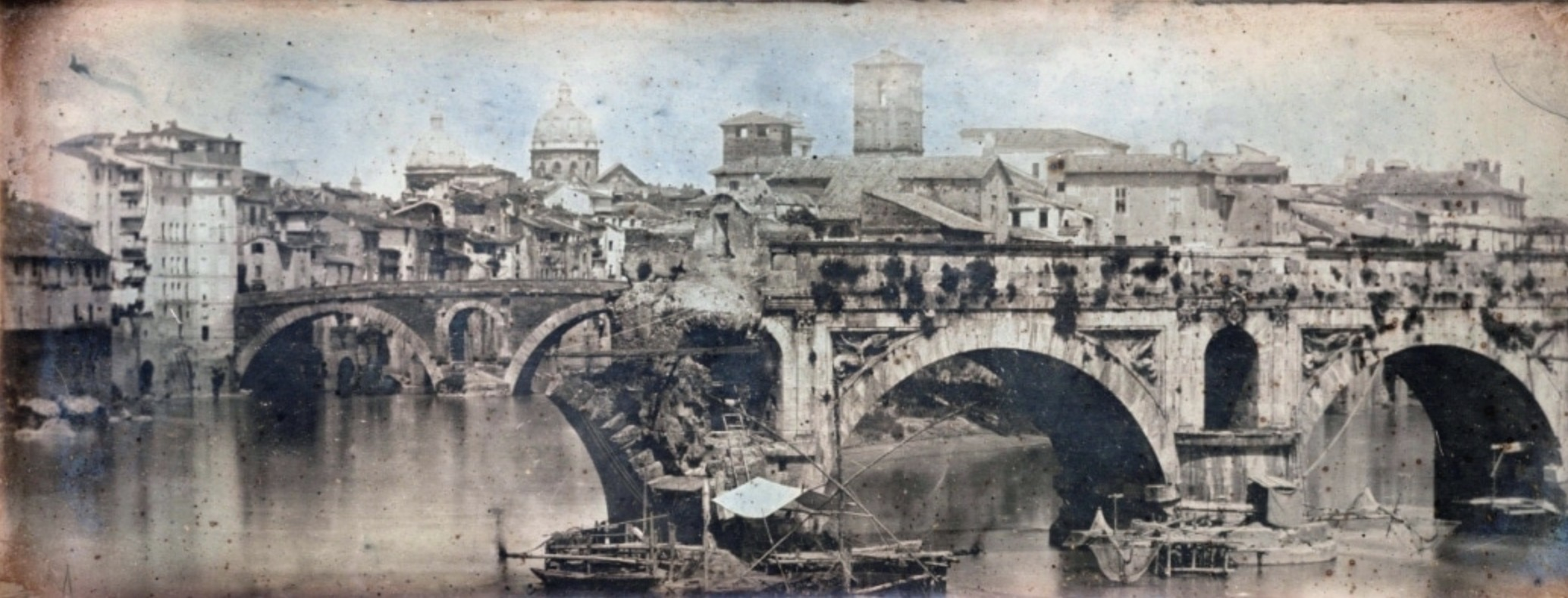
The Ponte Rotto in 1842

For many years, it was used as a fishing pier. In 1853, Pope Pius IX had the remnants of the bridge connected to the mainland via an iron footbridge, but the heavy metal weakened the structural integrity of the stone. The remaining half was demolished in 1887 to make room for the Ponte Palatino, leaving behind only one arch that remains to this day.

== See also ==
- List of Roman bridges
- Roman architecture and engineering
