= Valli del Pasubio =

- Comune
- Comune di Valli del Pasubio
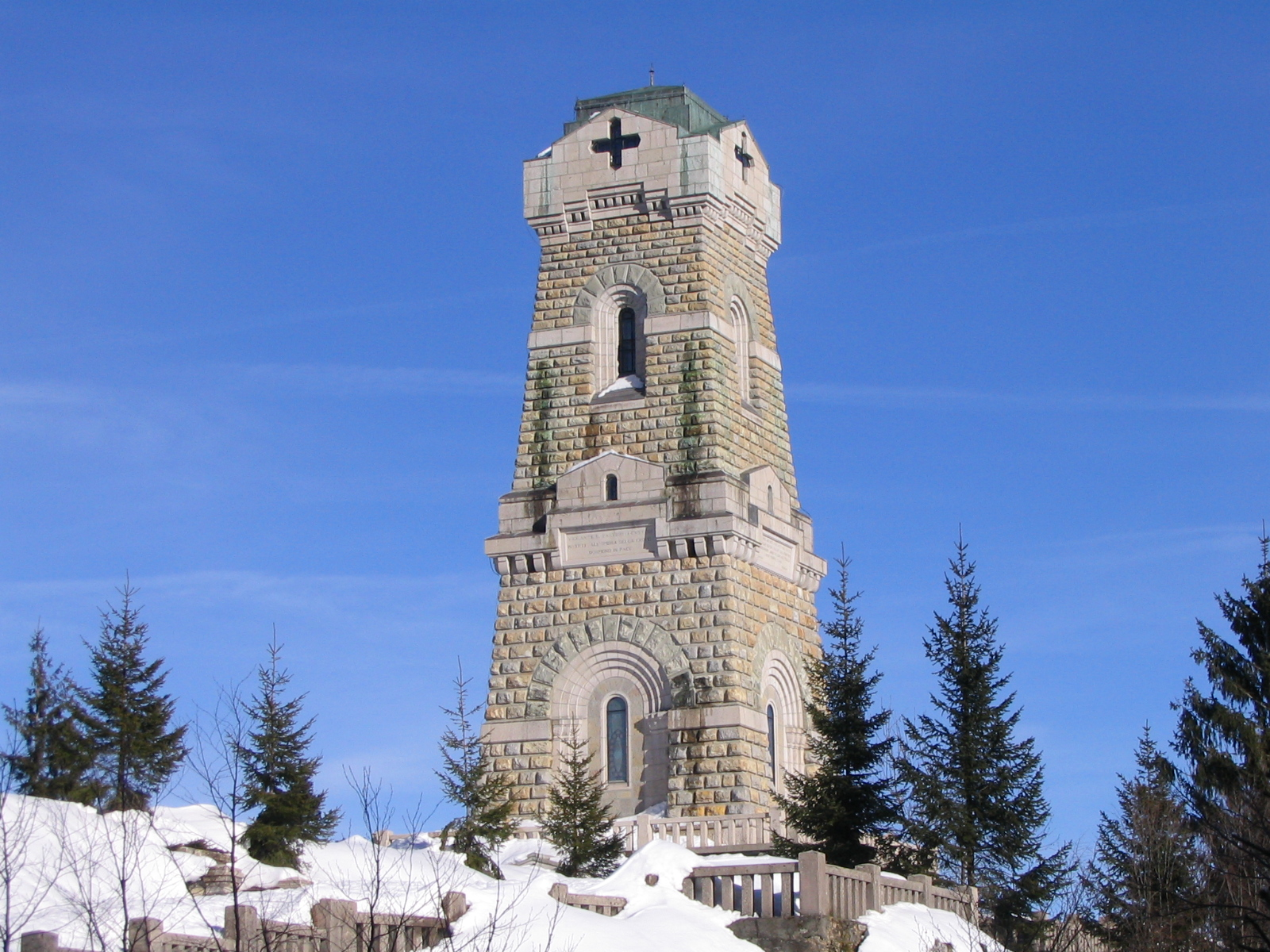
- Ossary of Pasubio.

- Location within Italy Location within Veneto
- Coordinates: 45°45′N 11°16′E
- Country: Italy
- Region: Veneto
- Province: Vicenza (VI)
- Frazioni: Sant'Antonio, Staro

Government
  - Mayor: Armando Cunegato

Area
  - Total: 49 km^{2} (19 sq mi)
- Elevation: 350 m (1,150 ft)

Population (31 December 2015)
  - Total: 3,242
  - Density: 66/km^{2} (170/sq mi)
- Demonym: Vallensi
- Time zone: UTC+1 (CET)
  - Summer (DST): UTC+2 (CEST)
- Postal code: 36030
- Dialing code: 0445
- ISTAT code: 024113
- Website: Official website

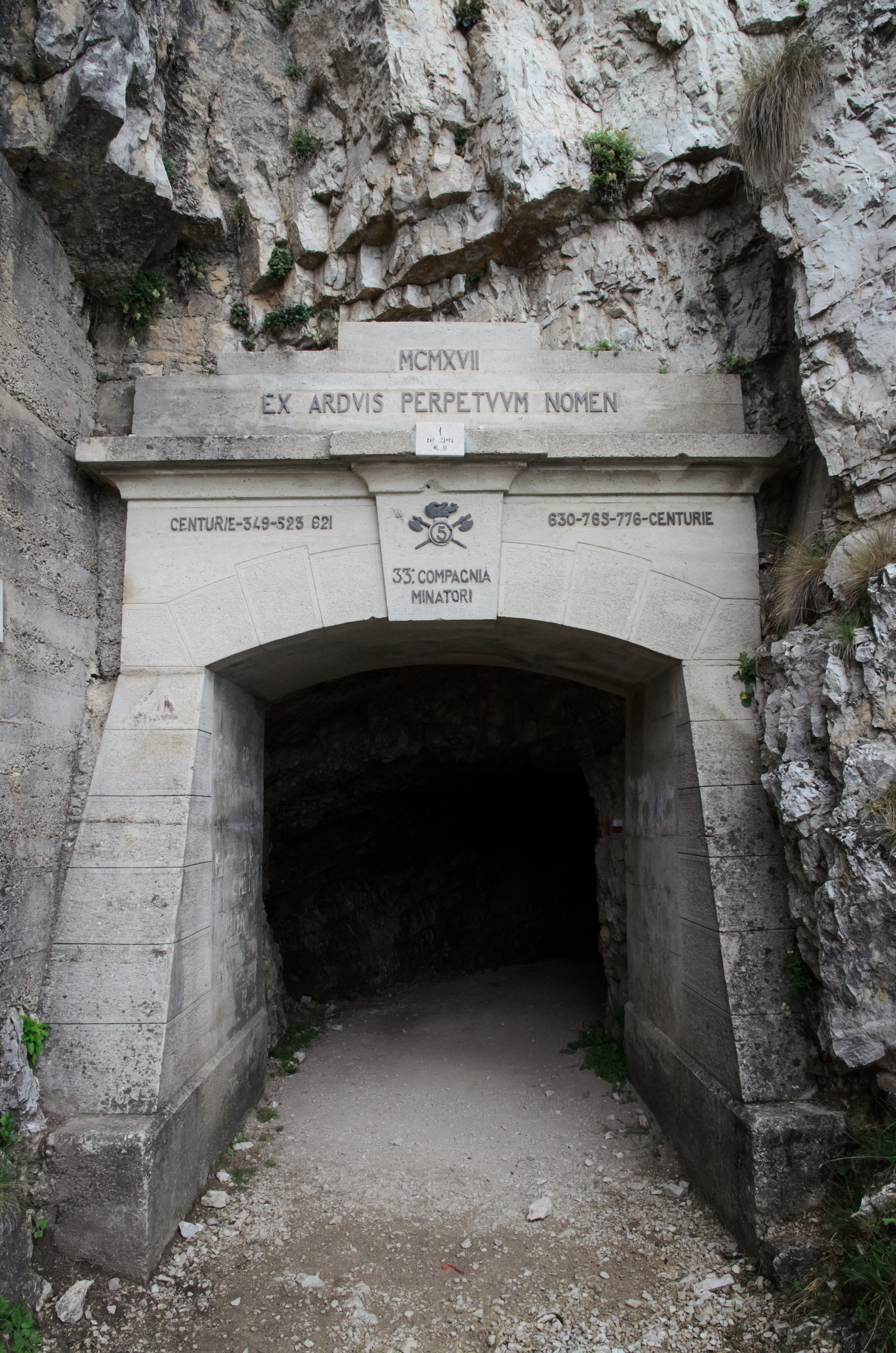
The entrance of the Strada delle 52 Gallerie

Valli del Pasubio is a town in the province of Vicenza, Veneto, Italy. It is north of SP46.

The town is a tourist destination. On the background of Valli, from right to left, are the Pasubio massif (whose highest peak is Cima Palon, also called Monte Pasubion), the Baffelan-Tre Apostoli-Cornetto (Group of Sengio Alto) group and finally, on the left, the Carega group: all are destinations for excursions and for climbing.

== Main sights ==
- Strada delle 52 Gallerie
- Giardino Botanico Alpino San Marco, an alpine botanical garden
