= Junttan =

Finnish manufacturing company

Junttan Oy
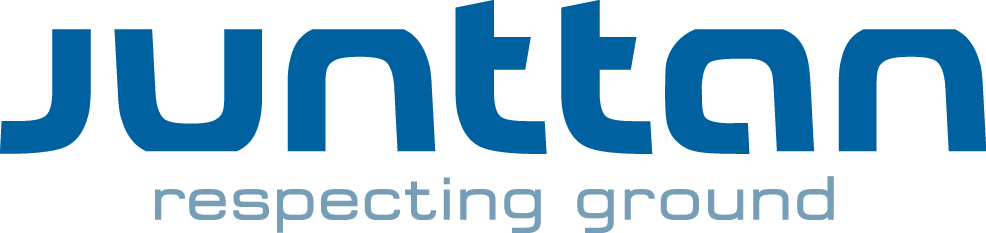
- Industry: Machinery manufacturing
- Founded: 1976; 50 years ago
- Founder: Pentti Heinonen
- Headquarters: Kuopio, Finland
- Key people: Tommi Lehtonen (CEO)
- Products: Hydraulic piling machines
- Operating income: ▲55.5 million euros (2021)
- Owner: Sinituote Oy 90.1%, Juha Heinonen 9.9%
- Number of employees: About 230 (2023)
- Parent: Sinituote Oy
- Website: junttan.com

Junttan Oy is a Finnish company that designs and manufactures hydraulic piling equipment. The Junttan product range consists of pile driving rigs, multipurpose piling and drilling rigs, as well as hydraulic impact hammers, rotary heads, and power packs.

== History ==
The roots of Junttan date back to the 1960s and a Finnish foundation company called Savon Varvi. Junttan was founded in 1976 by Pentti Heinonen and the first hydraulic piling rig was built in 1979.

=== 1970s ===
- Junttan founded in 1976.
- The first hydraulic piling rig was built in 1979.

=== 1980s ===
- The Junttan PM 20 model range was launched in 1983.
- The first Junttan rig deliveries outside Finland were in 1984.
- Exports started to Sweden and Denmark in 1984.
- The first deep stabilization machine was launched in 1988.

=== 1990s ===
- The new HHK-A series of hydraulic hammers was launched in 1993.
- The first heavy-duty rig PM 26-40 was launched in 1996.
- Junttan becomes Europe's leading manufacturer of hydraulic pile driving rigs.

=== 2000s ===
- A new Junttan factory opened in 2000.
- The new HHK-S hydraulic hammer range was launched in 2001.
- A new drilling rig platform was launched in 2005.
- Junttan became a part of the PiloMac group in 2006.
- Launching Junttan's biggest hydraulic hammer, the HHK 25S, in 2007.
- Manufacturing the 1000th Hydraulic hammer in 2007.
- Manufacturing the 500th Piling rig in 2008.
- Moving into new production facilities in 2008.

=== 2010s ===
- The Brotherus family became the majority shareholder of Junttan in 2010.
- Launching the new PMx pile driving rig series and SHARK hydraulic hammer concept in 2010.
- Acquiring the ExcaDrill rock drilling business unit from Pilomac Oy in 2010.
- Acquiring a component manufacturing unit from Komas Oy in 2012.
- The 40th anniversary of Junttan in 2016.

=== 2020s ===
- Launching a fully battery-powered electric pile driving rig, PMx2e, in 2021.

== Products ==
- Pile-driving rigs
- Hydraulic impact hammers
- Multipurpose piling machines
- Deep stabilization machines
- ExcaDrill excavator-mounted drill rigs
- Powerpacks
- Hammer accessories
- Rotary heads
- Rental and Leasing
- Used piling equipment
