= Torri di Quartesolo =

- Comune
- Comune di Torri di Quartesolo
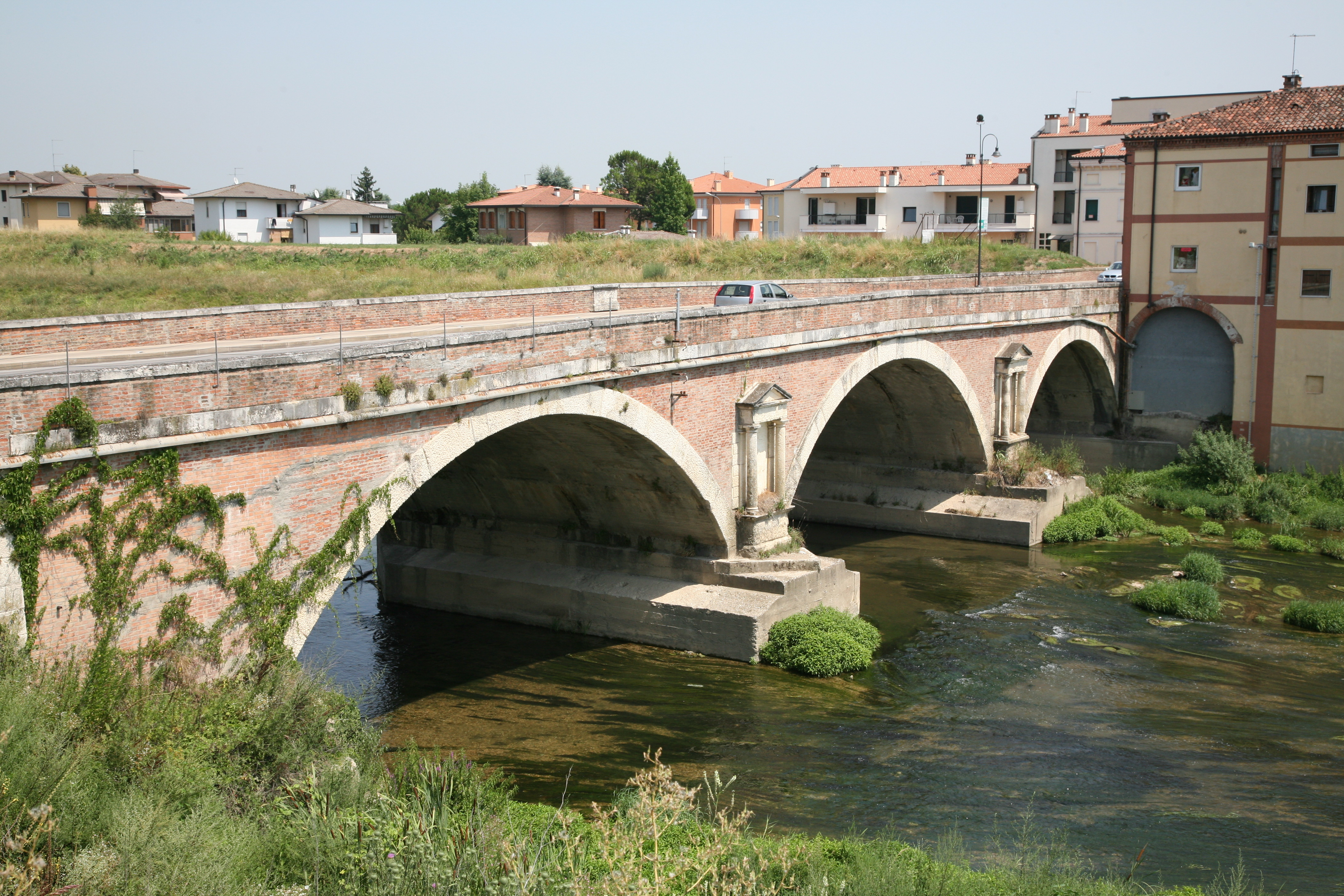
- Bridge on the Tesina river.

- Location within Italy Location within Veneto
- Coordinates: 45°31′N 11°37′E
- Country: Italy
- Region: Veneto
- Province: Vicenza (VI)
- Frazioni: Lerino, Marola

Government
  - Mayor: Gianluca Ghirigatto

Area
  - Total: 18.67 km^{2} (7.21 sq mi)
- Elevation: 30 m (98 ft)

Population (31 December 2015)
  - Total: 11,809
  - Density: 632.5/km^{2} (1,638/sq mi)
- Demonym: Quartesolani
- Time zone: UTC+1 (CET)
  - Summer (DST): UTC+2 (CEST)
- Postal code: 36040
- Dialing code: 0444
- Patron saint: Saints Gervasius and Protasius
- Saint day: 19 June
- Website: Official website

Torri di Quartesolo is a town and comune in the province of Vicenza, Veneto, northern-eastern Italy.

== Geography ==
It is north of E70 and west of A31, and has its own highway junction called "Vicenza Est", off the Autostrada A4.

== Economy ==
The defunct low-cost airline MyAir was headquartered in Torri di Quartesolo.

Torri di Quartesolo has become an important commercial hub in recent years, thanks to the opening in the 1990s of the shopping mall "Le Piramidi", which attracts shoppers from as far as 30 miles away and has spurred a remarkable residential and commercial development.
