= Ponte Altinate =

- Coordinates: 45.408904°N 11.878543°E
- Crosses: Brenta River
- Locale: Padua, Italy

Characteristics
- Design: Segmental arch bridge
- Total length: 44.40 m (incl. abutments)
- Width: 7.77 m
- Longest span: 12.29 m
- No. of spans: 3

History
- Construction end: 1st century BC

The Ponte Altinate is a Roman bridge in Padua, Italy. The late Republican bridge once spanned a branch of the Brenta river whose course is today followed by the street Riviera del Ponti Romani. The structure is located at the crossing with Via Altinate and, lying underground, completely obstructed from view by the modern pavement.

The rise-to-span ratio is 1:4 for the main arch and 1:3.7 for the two lateral ones, while the ratio of pier thickness to clear span is c. 1:5.

Close by is the similarly inaccessible Roman bridge Ponte San Lorenzo which is open to visitors at fixed hours though.

== See also ==
- Ponte Molino
- List of Roman bridges

== Sources ==
- Galliazzo, Vittorio (1994), I ponti romani. Catalogo generale, vol. 2, Treviso: Edizioni Canova, pp. 203–204 (No. 433), ISBN 88-85066-66-6
