= Giardino Botanico Alpino San Marco =

Botanical garden in Italy

Coordinates: 45°32′45″N 11°32′25″E

The Giardino Botanico Alpino San Marco (1 hectare) is an alpine nature preserve and botanical garden located at 1040 meters altitude, at Km 44 of SP 46, Pian delle Fugazze, Malga Prà, Valli del Pasubio, Province of Vicenza, Veneto, Italy. It is open at weekends during the warmer months.

The garden was established in 1961, and managed by the mountain community of Leogra-Timonchio. About one third of the garden is covered by beech forest; the remainder contains a mountain meadow, man-made wetlands, and a rock garden. Its plants are almost entirely local to the surrounding Dolomites and Venetian Alps.

== See also ==
- List of botanical gardens in Italy
