= MyAir =

Low-cost airline of Italy (2004–2009)

My Way Airlines

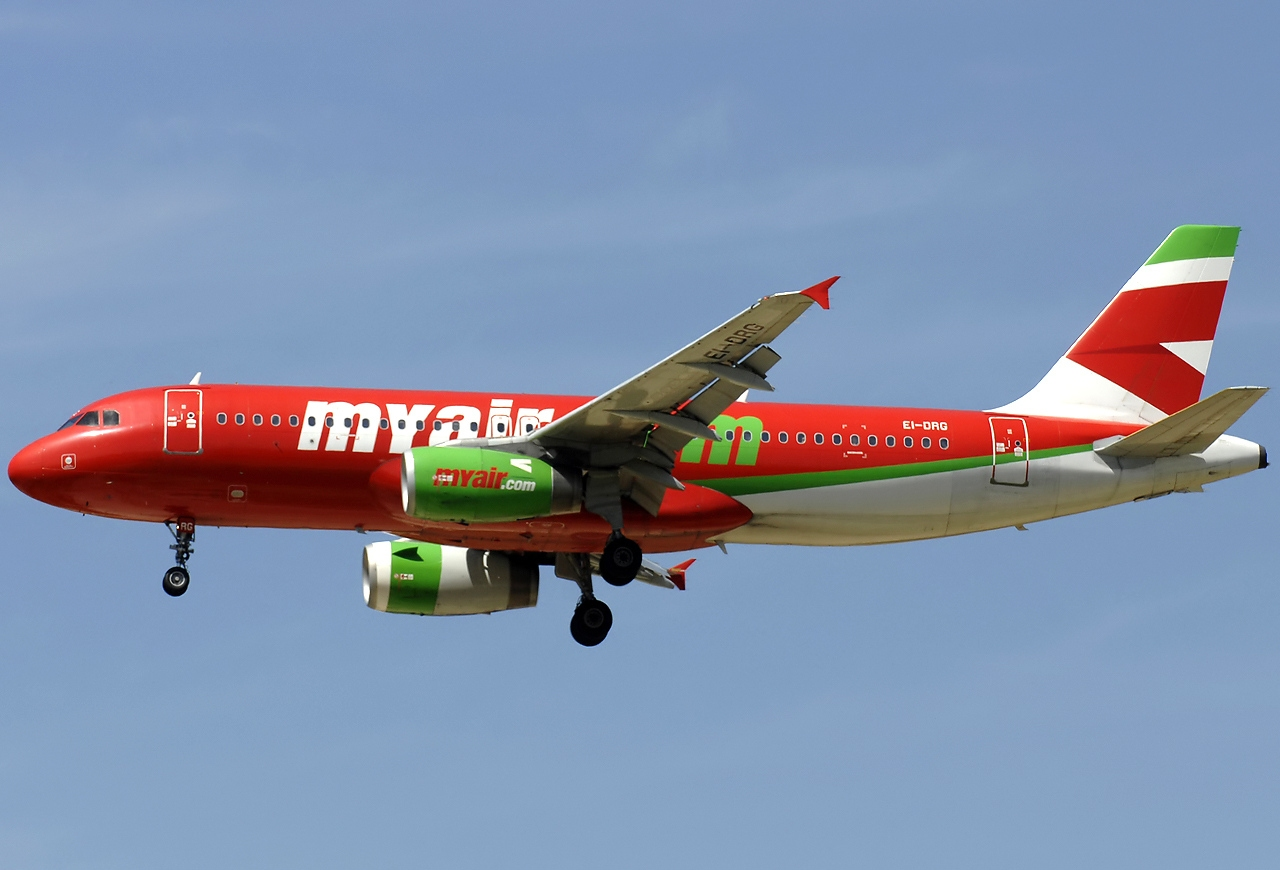
- Airbus A320-200
IATA	ICAO	Call sign
8I	MYW	FRANKY
- Founded: 17 December 2004
- Ceased operations: 24 July 2009
- Operating bases: Bergamo; Venice
- Parent company: Trismel SRL (51%); My Holding (23%)
- Headquarters: Torri di Quartesolo, Vicenza, Italy
- Key people: Carlo Bernini (CEO)

My Way Airlines s.r.l., operated as MyAir.com, was a low-cost airline based in Torri di Quartesolo, close to Vicenza, Italy. It operated scheduled services linking a dozen Italian cities and international flights to France, Romania, Bulgaria, Turkey, Morocco, Spain, Belgium, and the Netherlands. Its main base was Orio al Serio Airport, Bergamo, near Milan, until ENAC (Italian Civil Aviation Authority) suspended the flights to and from this airport. On 22 July 2009, ENAC announced a suspension of MyAir's licence, effective 00:01 CEST on 24 July.

== History ==
The airline was established in 2004 and part of the management came from the disbanded Volare Airlines. Owners included Triskel SRL (51%) and My Holding (23%). Operations were launched on 17 December 2004, with three wet-leased Airbus A320-200s. The following week, the air carrier received its own air operator certificate (AOC) and started operations with its own Airbus A320-200.

In September 2006 MyAir announced a firm order for 19 Bombardier CRJ900s. In February 2007, after four aircraft had been delivered, Bombardier announced that the remaining 15 orders had been converted to the CRJ-1000 serie. On 11 August 2009, Bombardier announced that it had terminated the purchase agreement of MyAir, in relationship with all remaining undelivered aircraft. This decision was certainly linked to an event that had occurred a few days earlier.

On 21 July 2009, ENAC suspended MyAir operations from Bergamo-Orio al Serio Airport due to unpaid taxes, duties and tariffs. Flights from Venice Marco Polo Airport and Bari International Airport were also suspended. This suspension was effective from 24 July.

On September 3, 2009, it was announced that the company management was in talks with four financial backers, in order to resume operations. Due to the bankruptcy of the parent company, MyWay was put under extraordinary administration since 31 October 2009. On 2 February of the following year, Vicenza Court initiated bankruptcy proceedings.

== Fleet ==
Aircraft	Image	Total	In fleet	Struck off	Remarks
Airbus A320-200		9	2004	2011	All leased from lessors or other airlines
Bombardier CRJ900		4	2006	2010	
Fokker F100		1	2005	2005	Leased
McDonnell Douglas MD-82		4	2005	2007	All leased from lessors or other airlines
Saab 2000		1	2008	2008	leased from Darwin Airline
