= Pile driver =

Heavy equipment

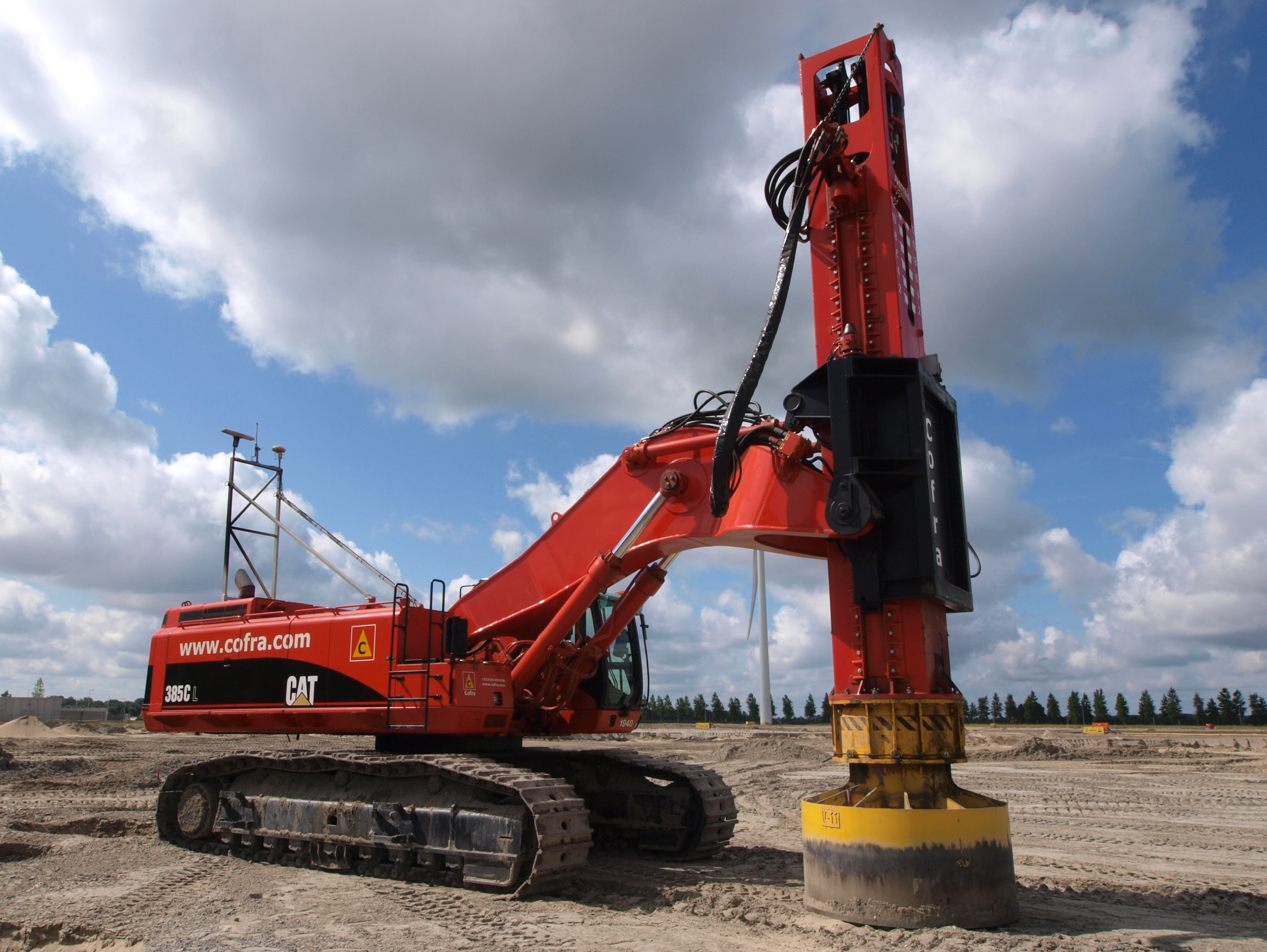
Tracked vehicle configured as a dedicated pile driver

A pile driver is a heavy-duty tool used to drive piles into soil to build piers, bridges, cofferdams, and other "pole" supported structures, and patterns of pilings as part of permanent deep foundations for buildings or other structures. Pilings may be made of wood, solid steel, or tubular steel (often later filled with concrete), and may be driven entirely underwater/underground, or remain partially aboveground as elements of a finished structure.

The term "pile driver" is also used to describe members of the construction crew associated with the task, also colloquially known as "pile bucks".

The most common form of pile driver uses a heavy weight situated between vertical guides placed above a pile. The weight is raised by some motive power (which may include hydraulics, steam, diesel, electrical motor, or manual labor). At its apex the weight is released, impacting the pile and driving it into the ground.

== History ==
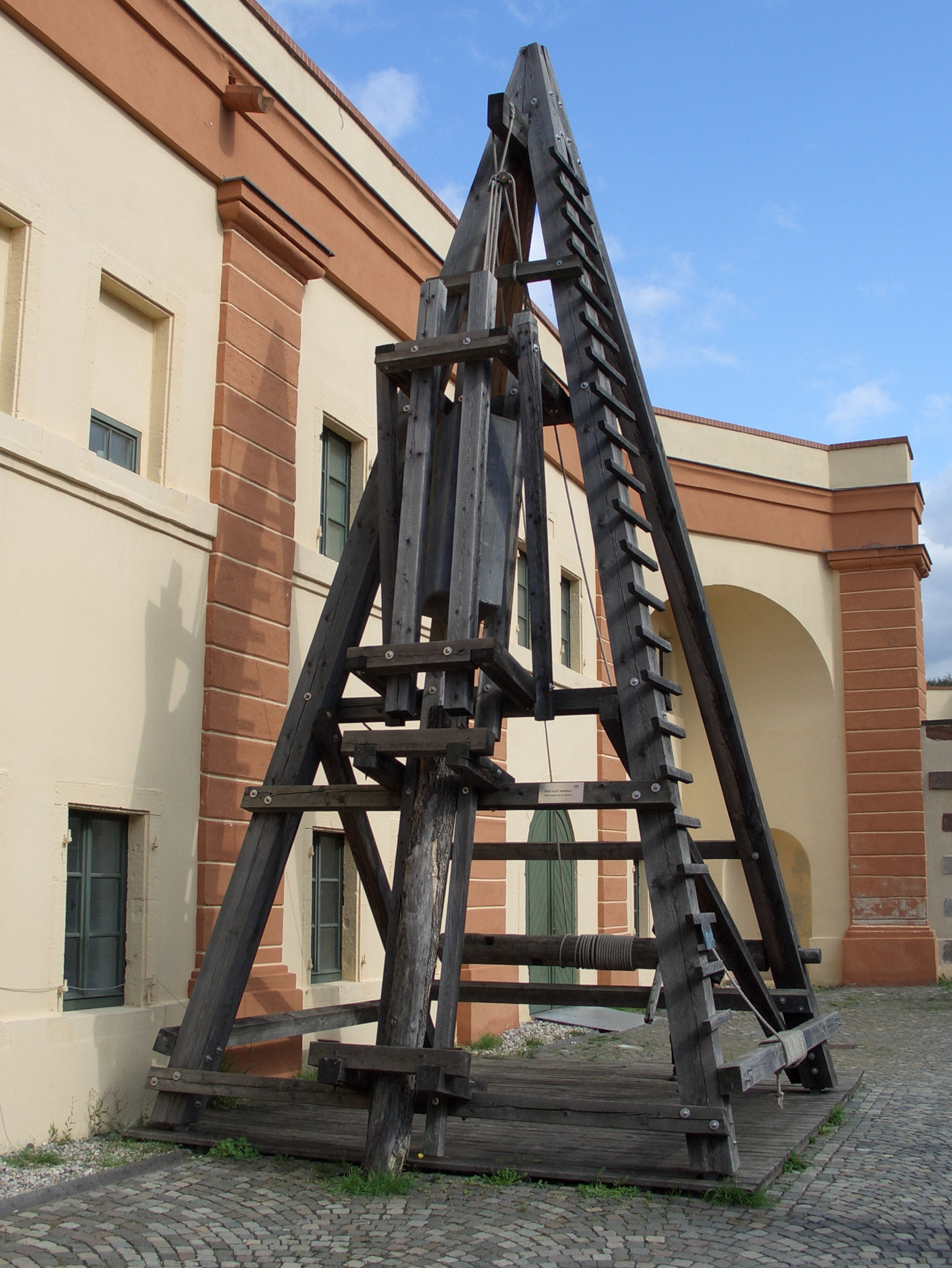
Replica of Ancient Roman pile driver used at the construction of Caesar's Rhine bridges (55 BC)

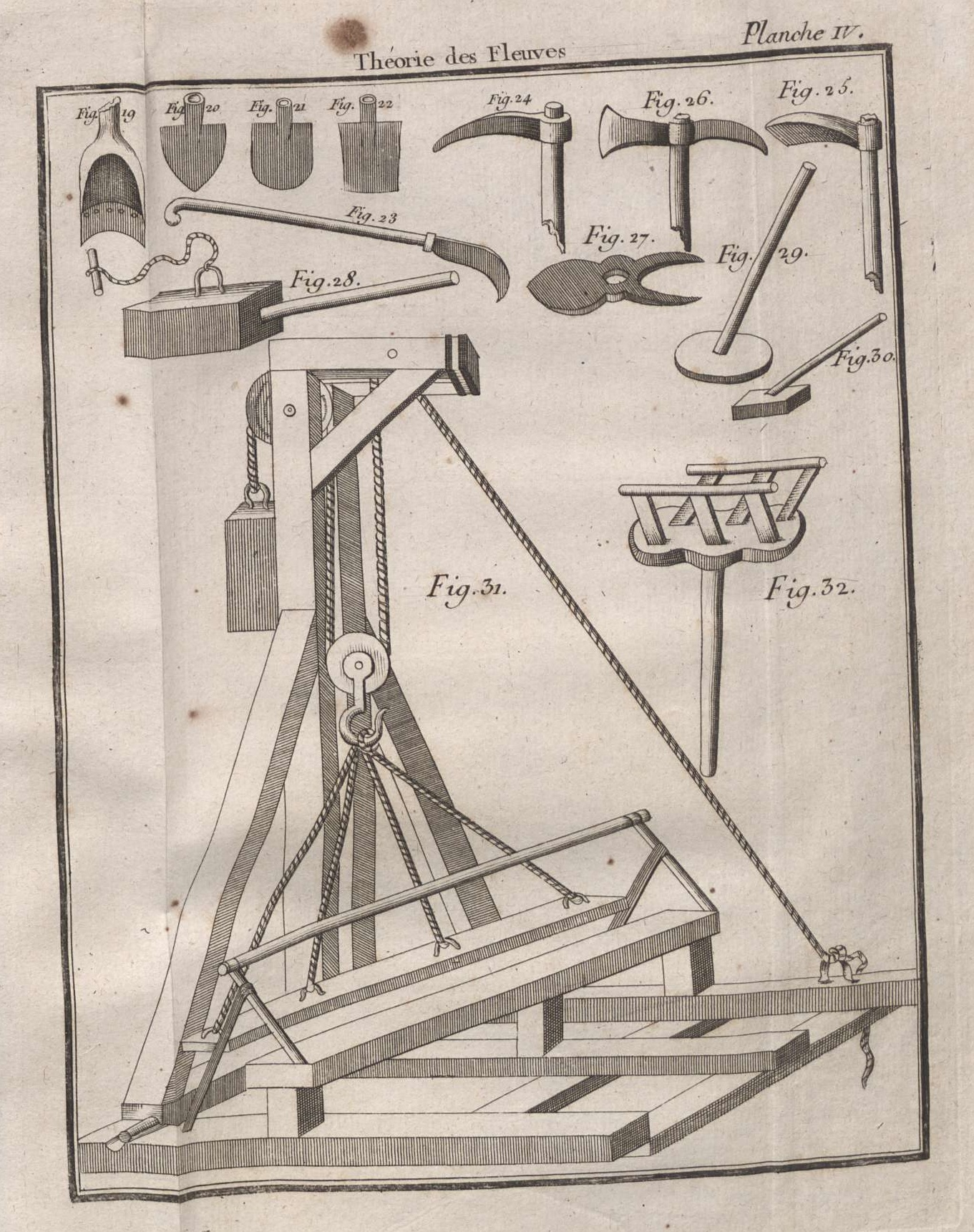
18th-century Pile driver, from Abhandlung vom Wasserbau an Strömen, 1769

There are a number of claims to the invention of the pile driver. A mechanically sound drawing of a pile driver appeared as early as 1475 in Francesco di Giorgio Martini's treatise Trattato di Architectura. Also, several other prominent inventors—James Nasmyth (son of Alexander Nasmyth), who invented a steam-powered pile driver in 1845, watchmaker James Valoué, Count Giovan Battista Gazzola, and Leonardo da Vinci—have all been credited with inventing the device. However, there is evidence that a comparable device was used in the construction of Crannogs at Oakbank and Loch Tay in Scotland as early as 5000 years ago. In 1801 John Rennie came up with a steam pile driver in Britain. Otis Tufts is credited with inventing the steam pile driver in the United States.

== Types ==
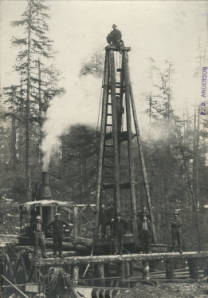
Pile driver, 1917

Ancient pile driving equipment used human or animal labor to lift weights, usually by means of pulleys, then dropping the weight onto the upper end of the pile. Modern piledriving equipment variously uses hydraulics, steam, diesel, or electric power to raise the weight and guide the pile.

=== Diesel hammer ===
Concrete spun pile driving using diesel hammer in Patimban Deep Sea Port, Indonesia

A modern diesel pile hammer is a large two-stroke diesel engine. The weight is the piston, and the apparatus which connects to the top of the pile is the cylinder. Piledriving is started by raising the weight, usually a cable from the crane holding the pile driver, which draws air into the cylinder. Diesel fuel is injected into the cylinder. The weight is dropped, using a quick-release. The weight of the piston compresses the air/fuel mixture, heating it to the ignition point of diesel fuel. The mixture ignites, transferring the energy of the falling weight to the pile head, and driving the weight up. The rising weight draws in fresh air, and the cycle continues until the fuel is depleted or is halted by the crew.

From an army manual on pile driving hammers: The initial start-up of the hammer requires that the piston (ram) be raised to a point where the trip automatically releases the piston, allowing it to fall. As the piston falls, it activates the fuel pump, which discharges a metered amount of fuel into the ball pan of the impact block. The falling piston blocks the exhaust ports, and compression of fuel trapped in the cylinder begins. The compressed air exerts a pre-load force to hold the impact block firmly against the drive cap and pile. At the bottom of the compression stroke, the piston strikes the impact block, atomizing the fuel and starting the pile on its downward movement. In the instant after the piston strikes, the atomized fuel ignites, and the resulting explosion exerts a greater force on the already moving pile, driving it further into the ground. The reaction of the explosion rebounding from the resistance of the pile drives the piston upward. As the piston rises, the exhaust ports open, releasing the exhaust gases to the atmosphere. After the piston stops its upward movement, it again falls by gravity to start another cycle.

=== Vertical travel lead systems ===
Berminghammer vertical travel leads in use

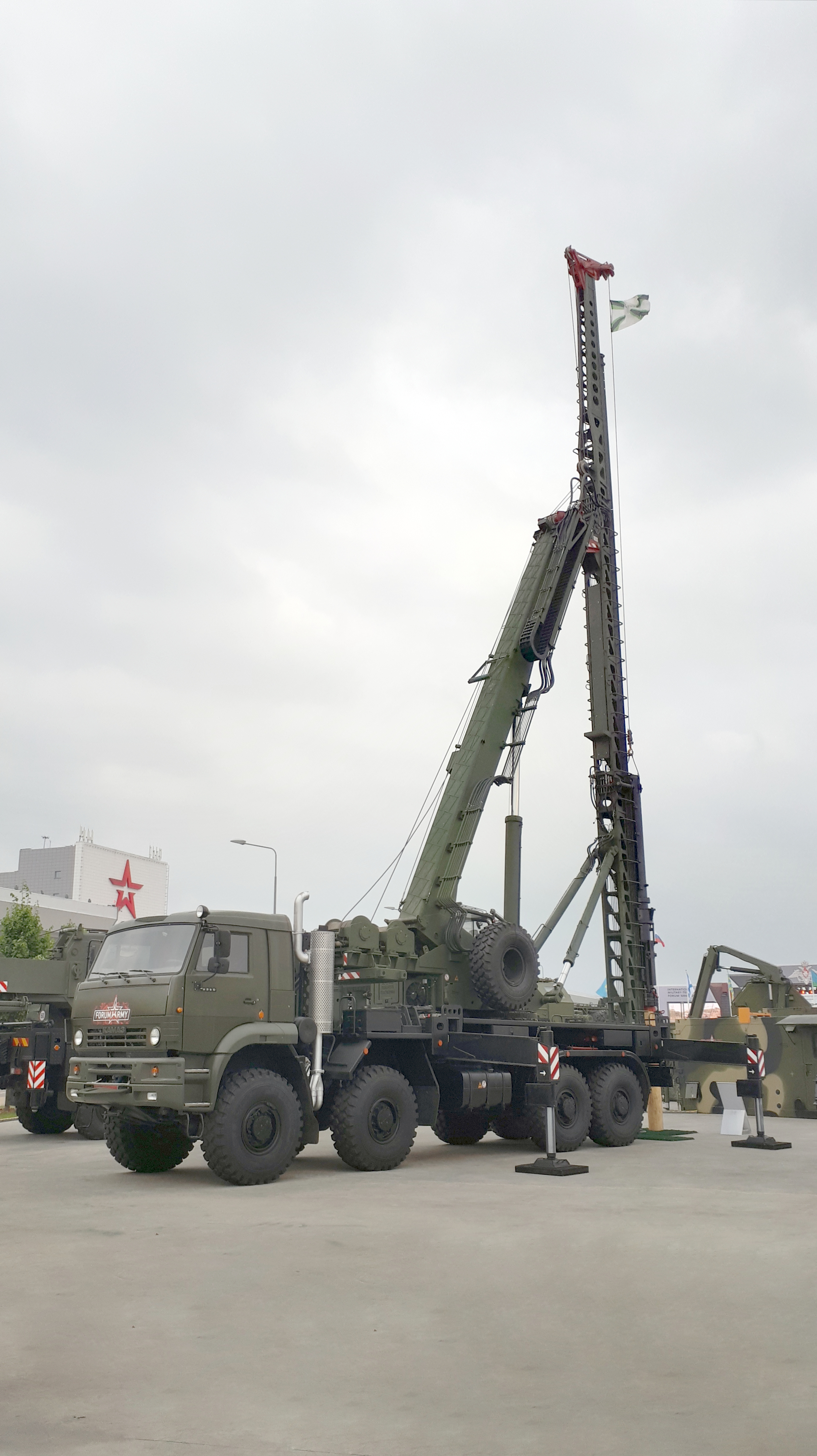
Military building mobile unit on "Army-2021" exhibition

Vertical travel leads come in two main forms: spud and box lead types. Box leads are very common in the Southern United States and spud leads are common in the Northern United States, Canada and Europe.

=== Hydraulic hammer ===
A hydraulic hammer is a modern type of piling hammer used instead of diesel and air hammers for driving steel pipe, precast concrete, and timber piles. Hydraulic hammers are more environmentally acceptable than older, less efficient hammers as they generate less noise and pollutants. In many cases the dominant noise is caused by the impact of the hammer on the pile, or the impacts between components of the hammer, so that the resulting noise level can be similar to diesel hammers.

=== Hydraulic press-in ===
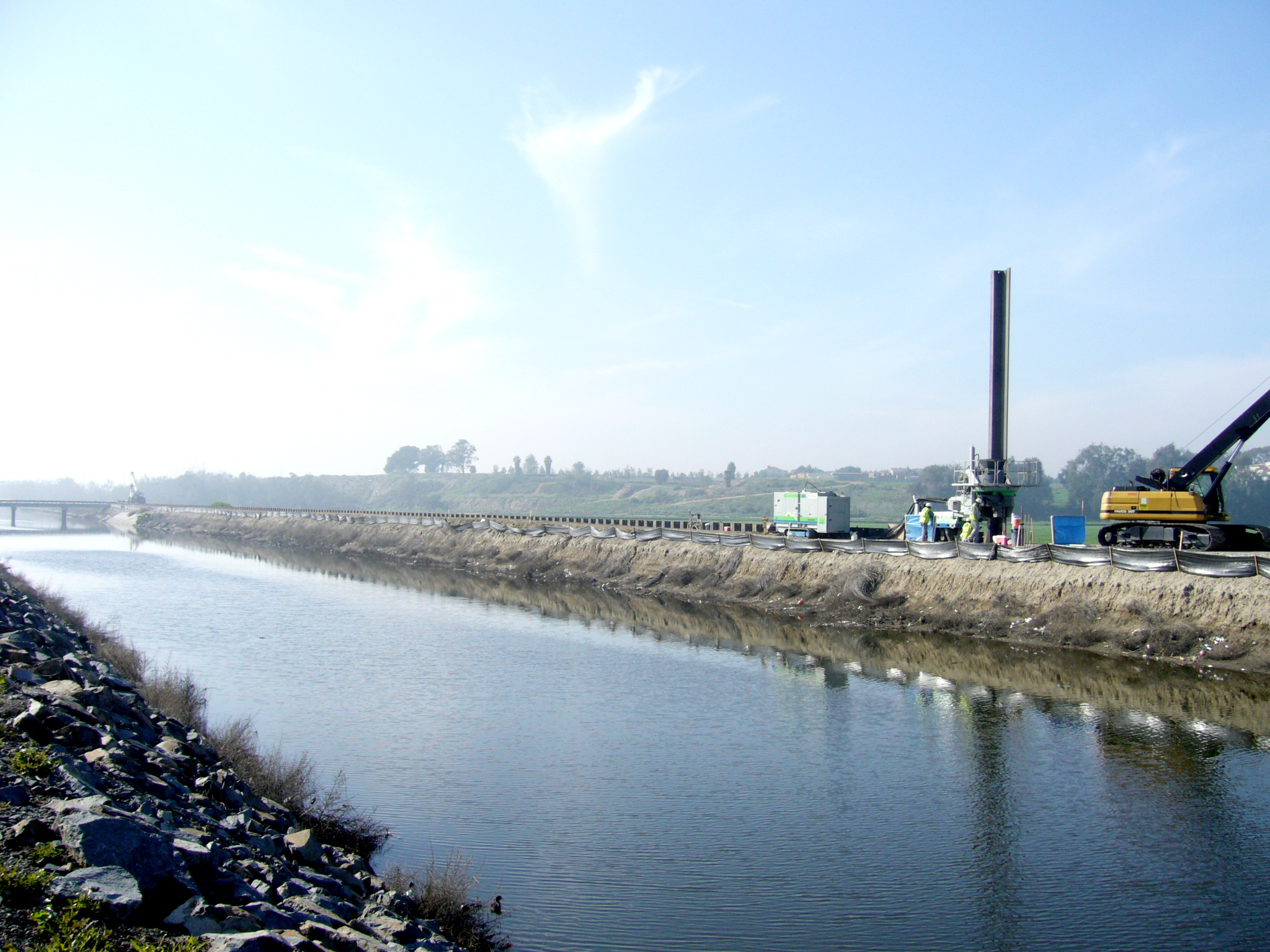
A steel sheet pile being hydraulically pressed

Hydraulic press-in equipment installs piles using hydraulic rams to press piles into the ground. This system is preferred where vibration is a concern. There are press attachments that can adapt to conventional pile driving rigs to press 2 pairs of sheet piles simultaneously. Other types of press equipment sit atop existing sheet piles and grip previously driven piles. This system allows for greater press-in and extraction force to be used since more reaction force is developed. The reaction-based machines operate at only 69 dB at 23 ft allowing for installation and extraction of piles in close proximity to sensitive areas where traditional methods may threaten the stability of existing structures.

Such equipment and methods are specified in portions of the internal drainage system in the New Orleans area after Hurricane Katrina, as well as projects where noise, vibration and access are a concern.

=== Vibratory pile driver/extractor ===
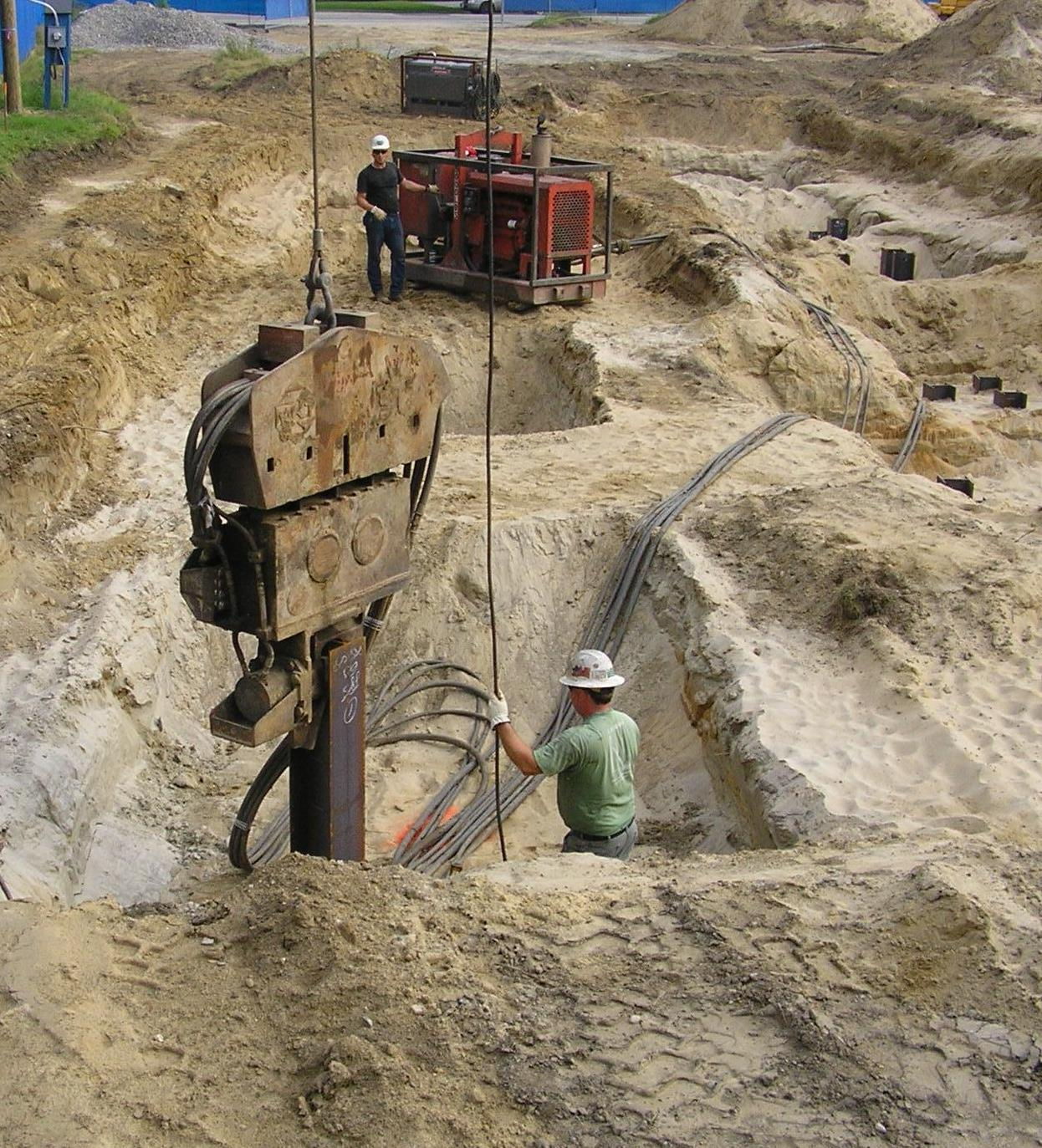
A diesel-powered vibratory pile driver on a steel I-beam

Vibratory pile hammers contain a system of counter-rotating eccentric weights, powered by hydraulic motors, and designed so that horizontal vibrations cancel out, while vertical vibrations are transmitted into the pile. The pile driving machine positioned over the pile with an excavator or crane, and is fastened to the pile by a clamp and/or bolts. Vibratory hammers can drive or extract a pile. Extraction is commonly used to recover steel I-beams used in temporary foundation shoring. Hydraulic fluid is supplied to the driver by a diesel engine-powered pump mounted in a trailer or van, and connected to the driver head via hoses. When the pile driver is connected to a dragline excavator, it is powered by the excavator's diesel engine. Vibratory pile drivers are often chosen to mitigate noise, as when the construction is near residences or office buildings, or when there is insufficient vertical clearance to permit use of a conventional pile hammer (for example when retrofitting additional piles to a bridge column or abutment footing). Hammers are available with several different vibration rates, ranging from 1200 vibrations per minute to 2400 VPM. The vibration rate chosen is influenced by soil conditions and other factors, such as power requirements and equipment cost.

== Piling rig ==
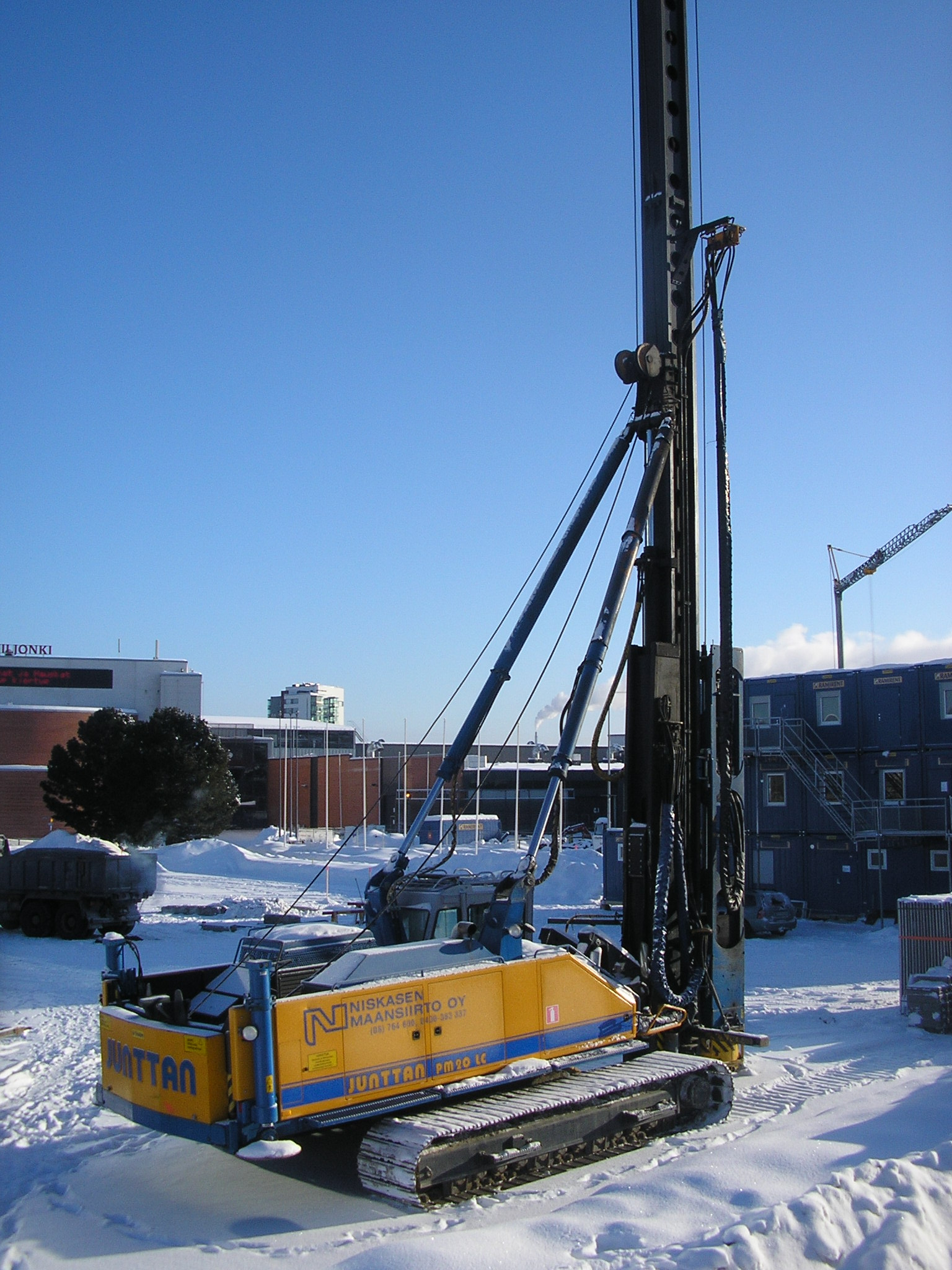
A Junttan purpose-built piledriving rig in Jyväskylä, Finland

A piling rig is a large track-mounted drill used in foundation projects which require drilling into sandy soil, clay, silty clay, and similar environments. Such rigs are similar in function to oil drilling rigs, and can be equipped with a short screw (for dry soil), rotary bucket (for wet soil) or core drill (for rock), along with other options. Expressways, bridges, industrial and civil buildings, diaphragm walls, water conservancy projects, slope protection, and seismic retrofitting are all projects which may require piling rigs.

== Environmental effects ==
The underwater sound pressure caused by pile-driving may be deleterious to nearby fish. State and local regulatory agencies manage environment issues associated with pile-driving. Mitigation methods include bubble curtains, balloons, internal combustion water hammers.

== See also ==
- Auger (drill)
- Deep foundation
- Post pounder
- Drilling rig
