= Roman bridge =

Bridges built by ancient Romans

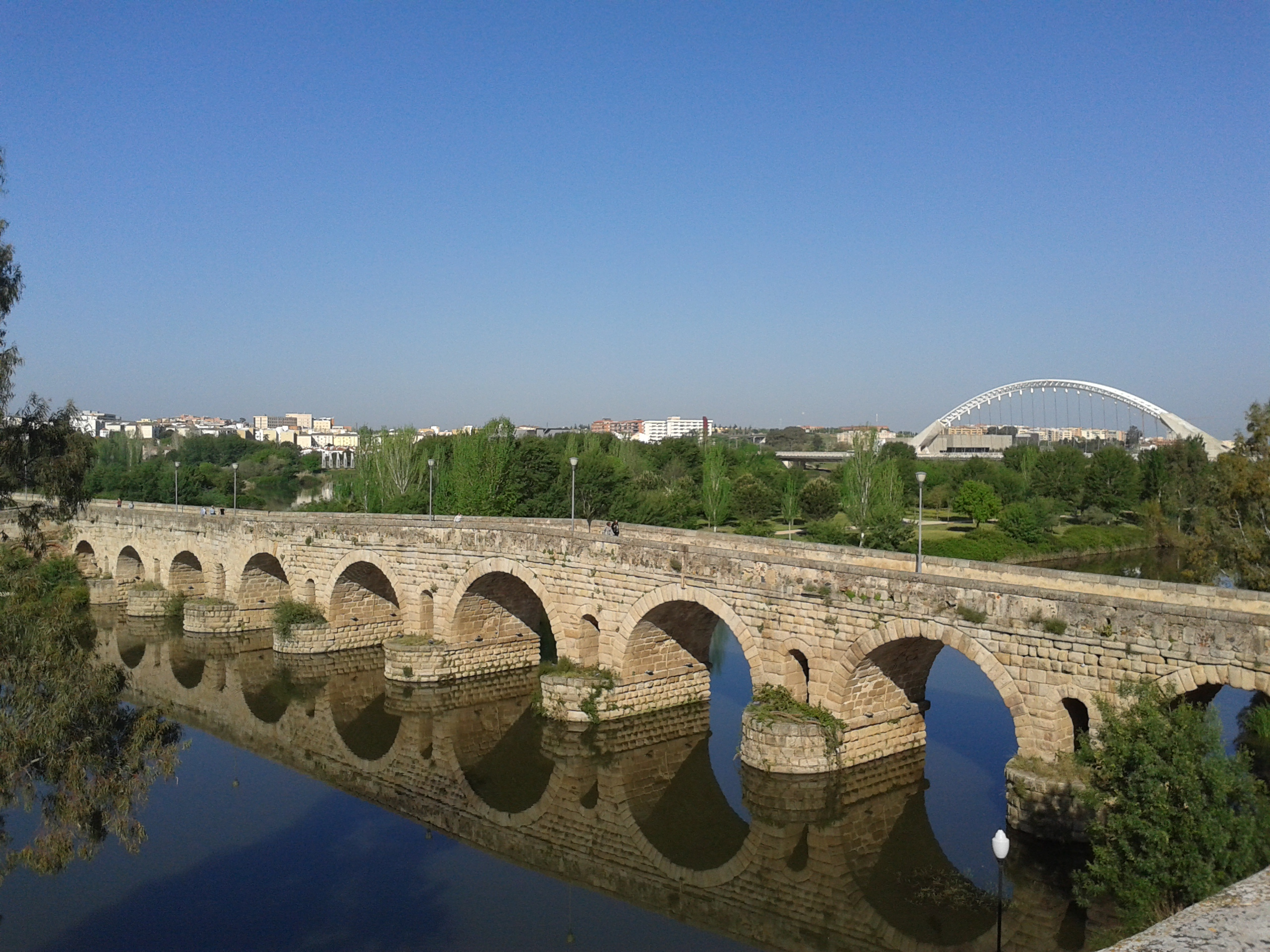
Puente Romano, Mérida, the world's longest (still in use) surviving Roman bridge

The ancient Romans were the first civilization to build large, permanent bridges. Early Roman bridges used techniques introduced by Etruscan immigrants, but the Romans improved those skills, developing and enhancing methods such as arches and keystones. There were three major types of Roman bridge: wooden, pontoon, and stone. Early Roman bridges were wooden, but by the 2nd century BC stone was being used. Stone bridges used the arch as their basic structure, and most used concrete, the first use of this material in bridge-building.

== History ==
Following the conquests of Tarquinius Priscus, Etruscan engineers migrated to Rome, bringing with them their knowledge of bridge-building techniques. The oldest bridge in ancient Rome was the Pons Sublicius. It was built in the 6th century BC by Ancus Marcius over the Tiber River. The Romans improved on Etruscan architectural techniques. They developed the voussoir, stronger keystones, vaults, and superior arched bridges. Roman arched bridges were capable of withstanding more stress by dispersing forces across bridges. Many Roman bridges had semicircular arches, but a few were segmental, i.e. with an arc of less than 180 degrees.

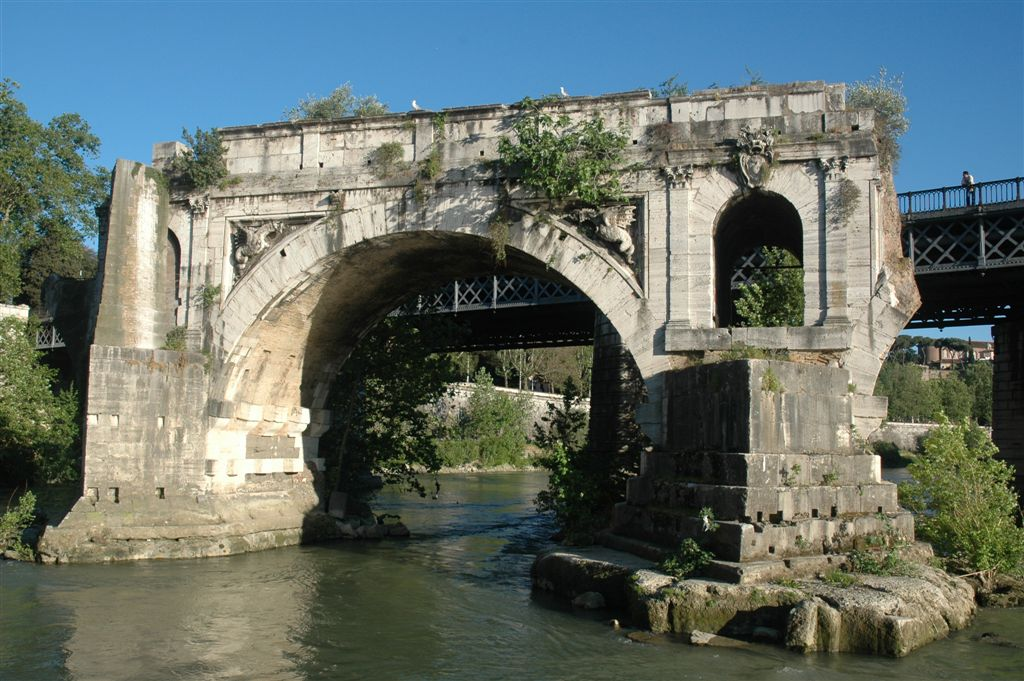
Pons Aemilius, the oldest stone bridge in Rome

By the 2nd century BC, the Romans had further refined their bridge-building techniques, using stronger materials such as volcanic ash, lime and gypsum. Also, they began to use iron clamps to hold together bridges, constructing midstream arches, and pentagonal stones to allow for wider vaults. According to Canadian classicist John Peter Oleson, no known stone bridges existed in Italy before the 2nd century BC. This view is not supported unanimously: Spanish engineer Leonardo Fernández Troyano suggested that stone bridges have existed since Pre-Roman Italy.

Between 150 and 50 BC, many stone Roman bridges were built, the Pons Aemilius being the first. Engineers began to use stone instead of wood to exemplify the Pax Romana and to construct longer-lasting bridges. These were the first large-scale bridges ever constructed. Bridges were constructed by the Roman government to serve the needs of the military and the empire's administration. Sometimes roads and bridges were used for commercial purposes, but this was rare as boats better served the needs of the Roman economy.

By the 2nd century Roman techniques had declined, and they had been mostly lost by the 4th century. Some Roman bridges are still used today, such as the Pons Fabricius, and even after the Fall of the Western Roman Empire, engineers copied their bridges. Roman bridge-building techniques persisted until the 18th century: for example, the prevalence of arches in bridges can be attributed to the Romans.

== Construction ==
=== Measurements ===
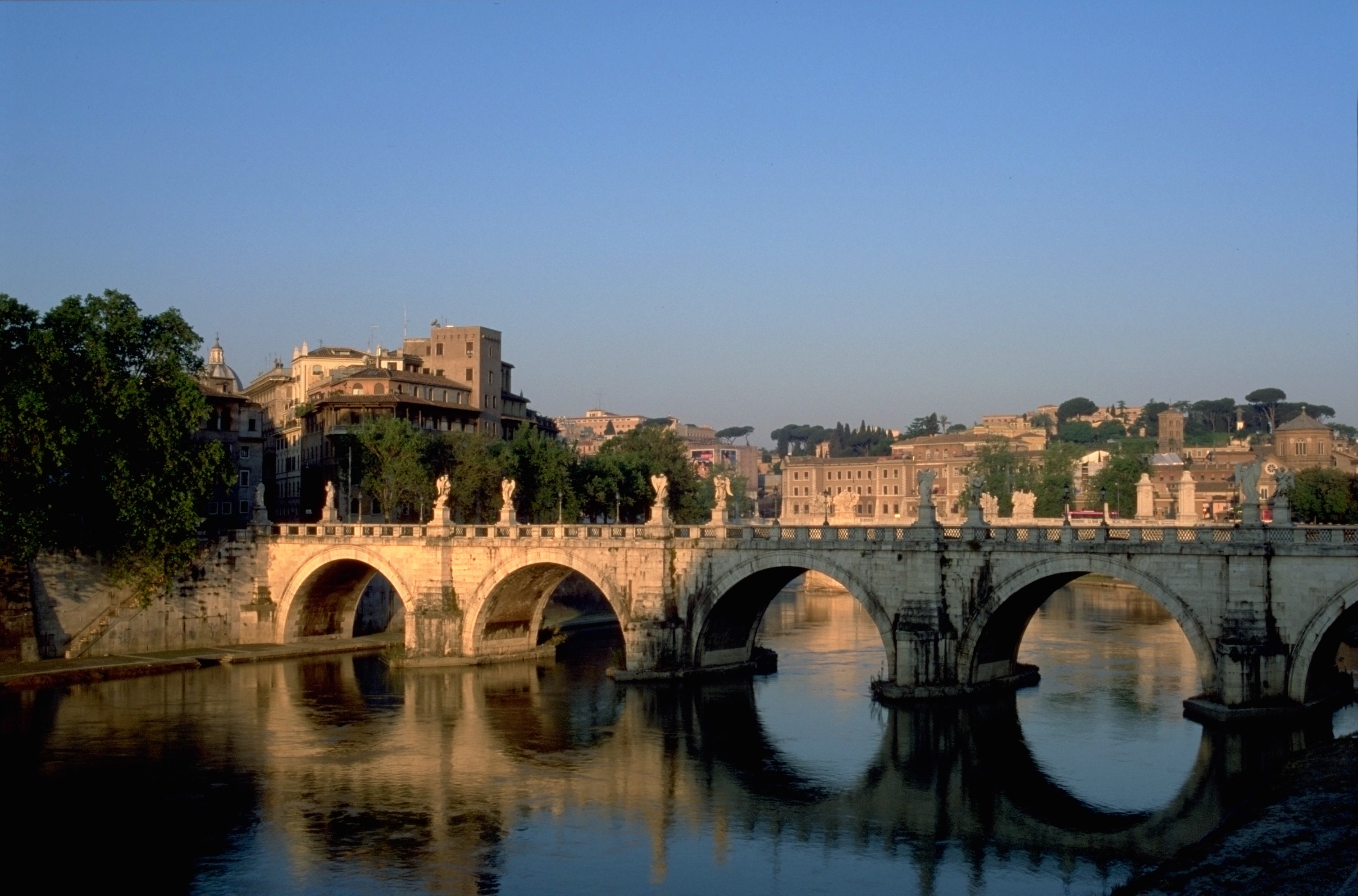
Ponte Sant'Angelo

Roman bridges were much larger than the bridges of other civilizations. They could be anywhere from 4.6 to 18.3 metres (15 to 60 ft) long. By the time of Augustus around the turn of the 1st millennium the maximum span of Roman bridges increased from around 24 metres (79 ft) in 142 BC to 34.2 metres (112 ft) at the c. 200 CE Severan Bridge in Türkiye (the longest known extant Roman stone arch). The Ponte Sant'Angelo, built during the reign of Hadrian, has five arches each with a span of 18 metres (59 ft). A bridge in Alcántara has piers 1 metre (3 ft 3 in) wide, 47 metres (154 ft) high, and arches with a span of 1.3 metres (4 ft 3 in). Another bridge over the Bibey River in Galicia has a pier 1 metre (3 ft 3 in) wide, arches with a 4.3-metre (14 ft) span, 6-and-9-metre (20 and 30 ft) side arches, and an arch spanning 18.5 metres (61 ft). Wider spans increase the bridge's drainage, reduce water pressure on the spandrels, and reduced the bridge's weight. Trajan's Bridge over the Danube featured open-spandrel segmental arches made of wood (standing on 40 metres (130 ft) high concrete piers). This was to be the longest arch bridge for a thousand years both in terms of overall and individual span length. The longest extant Roman bridge is the 790-metre (2,590 ft) Puente Romano at Mérida.

=== Stone bridges ===
Roman engineers would begin by laying a foundation for building bridges across moving bodies of water. At first, they used heavy timbers as pilings in the riverbed, but a later technique involved using watertight walls to redirect the water and then laying a stone foundation in the area. Work was exclusively done during the dry season to aid in constructing a foundation. This ensured as many piers as possible were accessible. There is some evidence that to construct bridges rivers were diverted. Trajan might have performed such a practice when constructing his Danube bridge. Roman engineers might have diverted rivers using rudimentary methods and tools. Sometimes dirt was added to the foundation. A bridge's foundation could be built above or below water level. Building the bridge above water level resulted in a need for a wider span. Bridge's tunnels and spandrels were designed to decrease the weight of the bridge and function as flood arches.

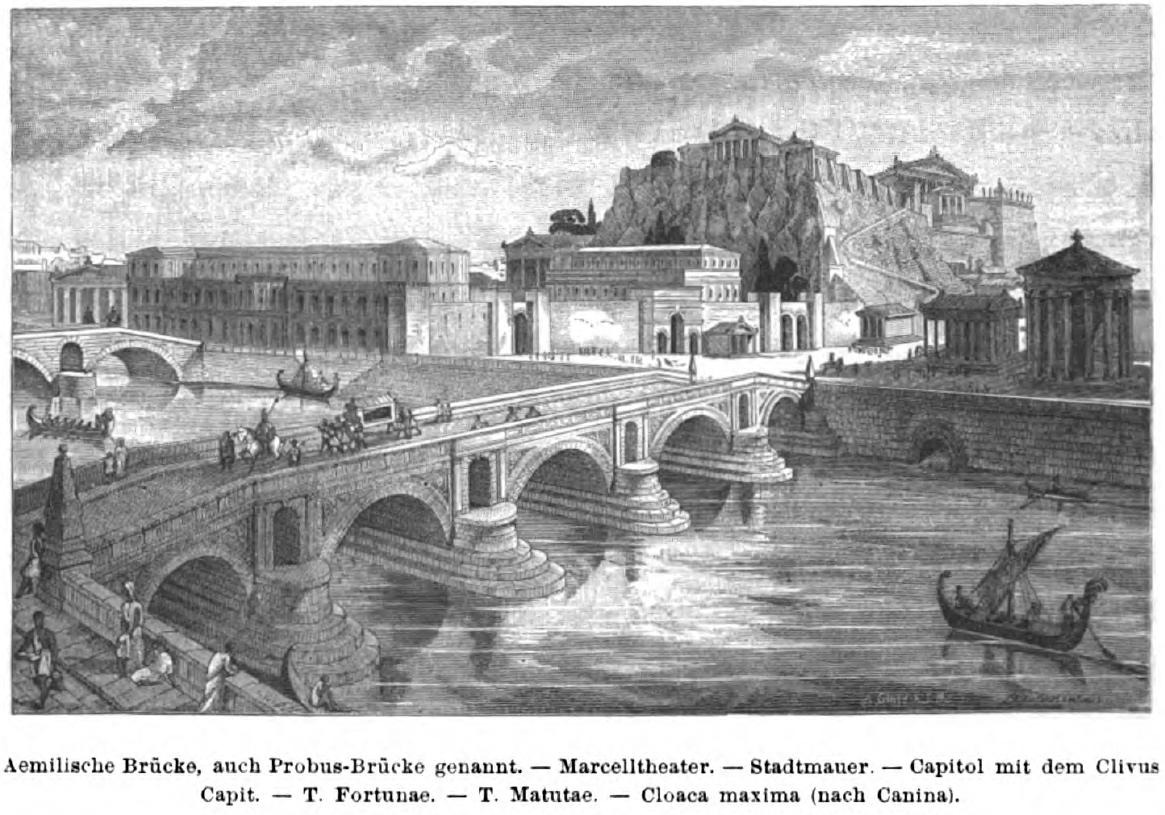
Pons Aemilius

The Pons Aemilius probably had stone piers with wooden roadbeds and arches. They were rebuilt in stone in 142 BC and either extended from the abutments to the piers or vice versa. Throughout Roman history, brick or stone arches supported bridges' weight. Roman engineers built bridges with one long arch instead of several smaller ones. This practice made construction easier, as they only needed to build one arch on land, instead of many in water. Roman arches were semi-circular and used voussoirs with equal dimensions and conic sections with equal circumference. Later in Roman history arches started to become semi-circular. Sometimes arches were segmented, or not semicircular. The Romans invented this technique. Segmented arches allowed greater amounts of flood water to pass, preventing the bridge from being swept away and allowing it to be lighter. The Bridge near Limyra in southwestern Turkey has 26 segmental arches with an average span-to-rise ratio of 5.3:1, giving the bridge an unusually flat profile unsurpassed for more than a millennium. The late Roman Karamagara Bridge in Cappadocia in eastern Turkey may represent the earliest surviving bridge featuring a pointed arch. However, it is now submerged by the Keban Dam. Roman arches were unable to fit into the arch springings properly, forcing the base of the arches upwards.

In the 2nd century, arches became thinner, and spandrels became flat and pierced with holes. They were constructed using a wooden frame to hold wedge-shaped blocks in place. Afterwards, the wooden frame was removed, but the weight of the keystone, the last block to be put in place, held it together. Bridges had abutments at each end and piers in the middle, these two design features carrying most of the bridge's weight. Abutments could be constructed in the many arches of a bridge, allowing each to be built separately. Piers were usually twenty-six feet thick and framed with starlings. The Karamagara Bridge represents an early example of the use of pointed arches.

Roman piers were thick enough to support the pressure of an arch. Stone arches allowed bridges to have much longer spans. Usually, iron clamps covered in lead were used to build piers. Because of poor performance underwater, Roman piers were often destroyed over time. Bridges that survived to the modern day were often furnished with cut waters on the upstream side and a flat downstream face, though some bridges, such as a bridge in Chester, are exceptions.

Two niches carrying cornices were inserted between pilasters. They were then put above the framed starlings. Roman bridges had spandrels, between which images of dolphins were often inserted. They rarely had wide spans and thick piers with bow-shaped piers that used small openings to allow for the flow of water. During construction, cranes were used to move materials and lift heavy objects. Some bridges had aprons. They were used to surround piers. Usually, the aprons covered the area of the stream bed near the bridge.

Marcus Vipsanius Agrippa used ashlar and bricks to cover the outside of bridges and concrete for footings and water channels. Ashlar was used because large amounts of wood were needed to cast the concrete. Travertine limestone and tuff were used to build Roman bridges, or they could be made of dry rubble or concrete. Often the building materials varied in smoothness, or rustication. Other bridges were made of bossed limestone combined with cornices, voussoirs and slabs. Sometimes bedrock, buttresses, and vaults were used to construct bridges. Bridges built in Iberia tended to have cylindrical vault geometry. In the first half of the 2nd century BC, blocks of stone held together with iron clamps were used to aid in the construction of bridges.

=== Brick bridges ===
Although Roman bricks were used to build many bridges, they were far more commonly used to build aqueducts. Bridges built from bricks were rare as bricks often failed to survive erosion. The brick bridges that were built were generally used by the military, and they used construction techniques called opus vittatum and opus mixtum, the latter alternating rows of bricks in opus reticulatum. Examples are bridges in Carmona, Palomas, Extremadura, and the Ponte della Chianche in Italy. One brick bridge in Ticino, Switzerland, has stone arches and brick spandrels. Bricks were sometimes used to create parts of bridges, such as vaults, piers with welding joints, and brick and mortar rubble.

=== Wooden bridges ===
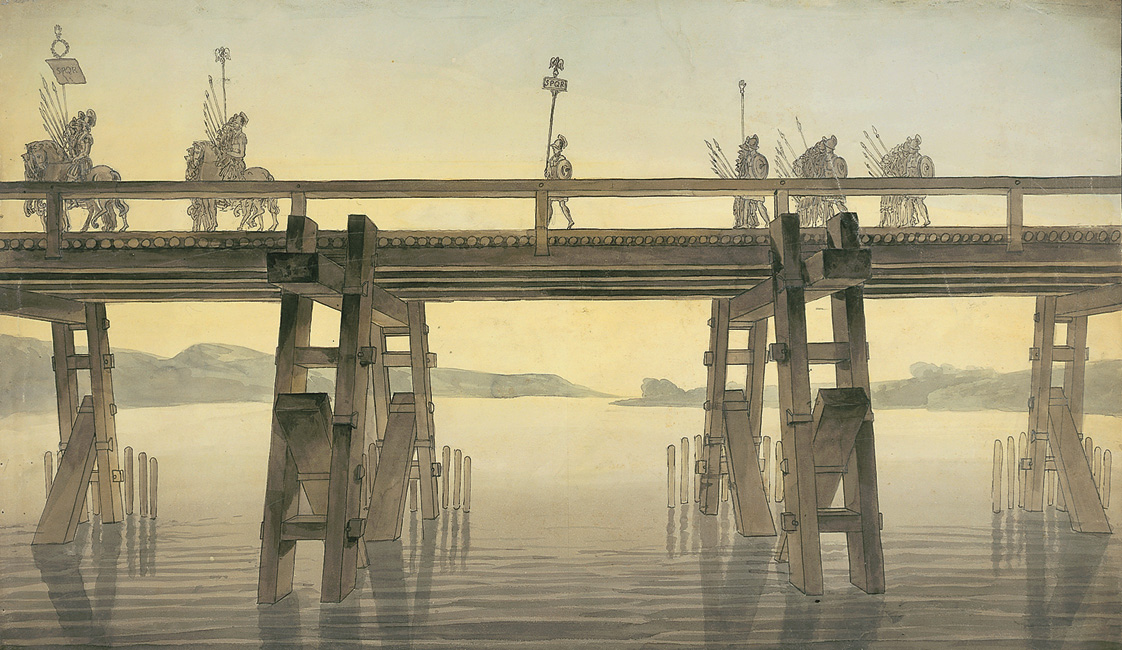
Caesar's Rhine Bridge

Early Roman bridges were wooden, including one constructed by Apollodorus and the Pons Sublicius, the oldest bridge in ancient Rome, and they were probably common across northern Europe and the Tyrrhenian coast; however, because of their lack of durability few have survived to the modern day. These bridges were supported by wooden trestles spanned by horizontal timbers and reinforced with struts, and they were possibly cantilevered. In order to simplify the process of cutting trees, multiple shorter timbers were used. Wooden poles were driven into the ground, and flat pieces of timber laid across them to create a flat surface.

Other early techniques used to build wooden bridges involved barges, sometimes they were moored side by side. Workmen would raise weights, sometimes by rope, then it would fall down onto the piles. This method of construction, called pile driving, was necessary for wooden bridges to properly function. Because this technique created cofferdams, which are enclosures build to pump water out of an area. The base for the foundation of the bridge would be put in this area. Cofferdams were constructed of many piles held together. It is possible the piles were interconnected, likely to improve positioning, waterproofness, or both. Cofferdams would have been sealed with packed clay. The cofferdams also needed to be consistently dry. In order to achieve this, engineers would use tools such as buckets to drain the water. Wooden bridges could be burned to stop an attacker, or dismantled quickly. For example, according to Livy, during a battle against the Sabines the Romans set one of their wooden bridges on fire, driving the enemy back. Other early wooden bridges used post and lintel construction.

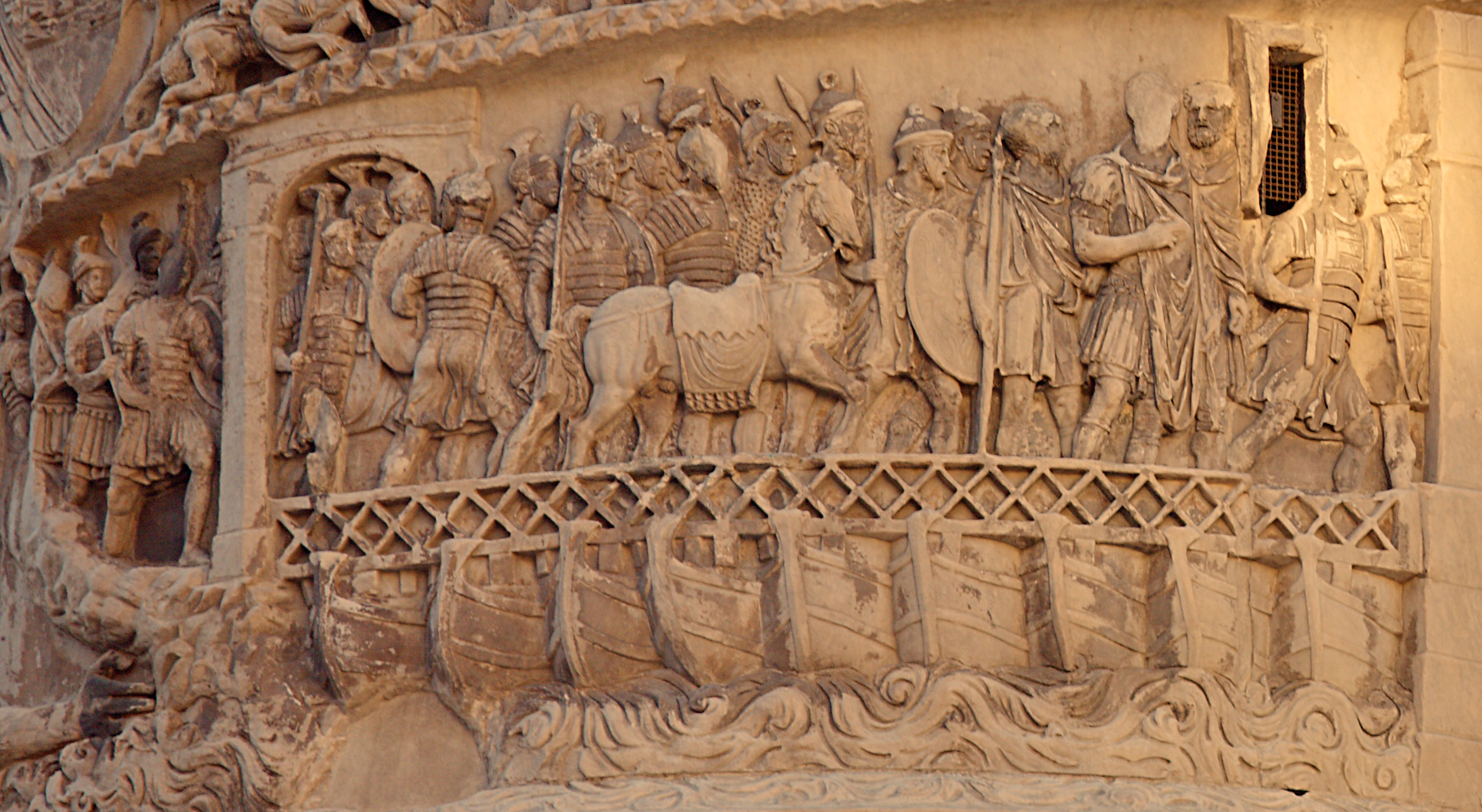
Roman legionaries crossing the Danube River by pontoon bridge, as depicted in a relief on the Column of Marcus Aurelius

=== Pontoon bridges ===
Pontoon bridges were built by laying boats from side to side across a river. During Julius Caesar's campaign in Germany, he built bridges by driving wooden piles into the stream bed from floating platforms and fixing beams at right angles across them to create trestles. Trajan built another bridge supported by stone during the Dacian Wars. Roman engineers gradually developed new techniques to build bridges, such as oval-shaped bases and pierced bases to facilitate the movement of water. Many bridges would have marble reliefs or carvings, but these bridges were likely used exclusively by government officials because of the difficulty and expense of carving marble artwork.

== Typology ==
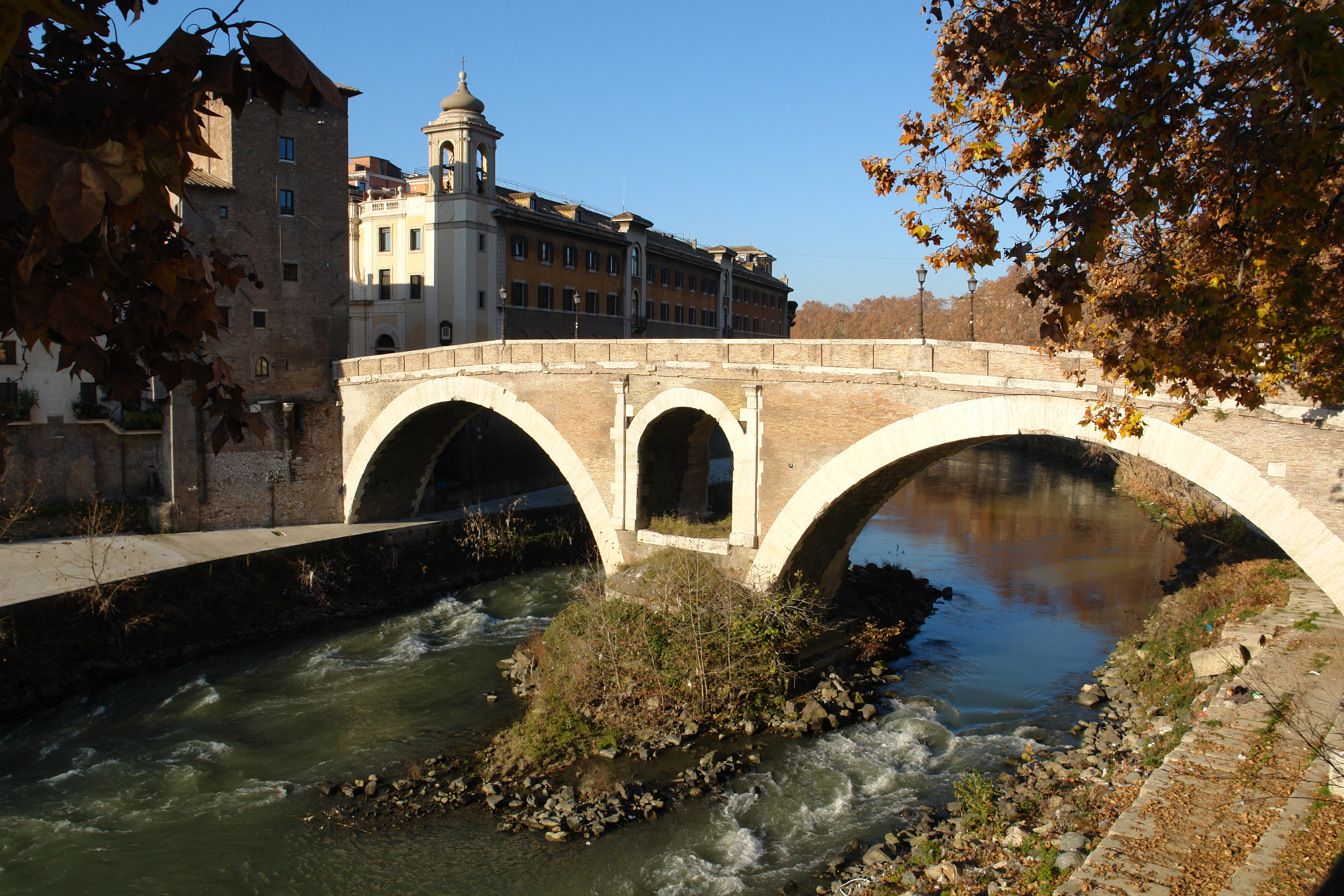
Pons Fabricius in Rome

There were three major types of Roman bridges. These were wooden, pontoon, and stone bridges. A list of Roman bridges compiled by the engineer Colin O'Connor features 330 stone bridges for traffic, 34 timber bridges and 54 aqueduct bridges, a substantial number still standing and even used to carry vehicles. A more complete survey by the Italian scholar Vittorio Galliazzo found 931 Roman bridges, mostly of stone, in as many as 26 different countries (including former Yugoslavia; see right table). A segmental arch is an arch that is less than a semicircle. The Romans built both single spans and lengthy multiple-arch aqueducts, such as the Pont du Gard and Segovia Aqueduct. Their bridges often had flood openings in the piers, e.g. in the Pons Fabricius in Rome (62 BC), one of the world's oldest major bridges still standing.

There were two main types of wooden bridge in Britain. Small timber bridges with girders, and large ones made of stone and wood. Throughout the rest of the Roman world, except for northern Europe, arched bridges made of stone were common. This was likely due to the climate and rivers of the regions. Rivers were much calmer and water levels were lower in the southern parts of the Empire. This ensured foundations were easy to construct. While in the northern parts it was much harder to lay down foundations due to the high water level, muddy water, and substantial waterflow.

== Location ==
The location of all 961 known Roman bridges
Europe	830	Asia	74	Africa	57
Italy	460	Turkey	55	Tunisia	33
Spain	142	Syria	7	Algeria	18
France	72	Jordan	5	Libya	5
Germany	30	Lebanon	4		
United Kingdom	29	Israel	2		
Portugal	14	Iran	1		
Yugoslavia	13				
Switzerland	11				
Greece	10				
Netherlands	4				
Bulgaria	3				
Luxemburg	3				
Albania	2				
Austria	2				
Belgium	2				
Romania	2				
Hungary	1				

== Opus pontis ==
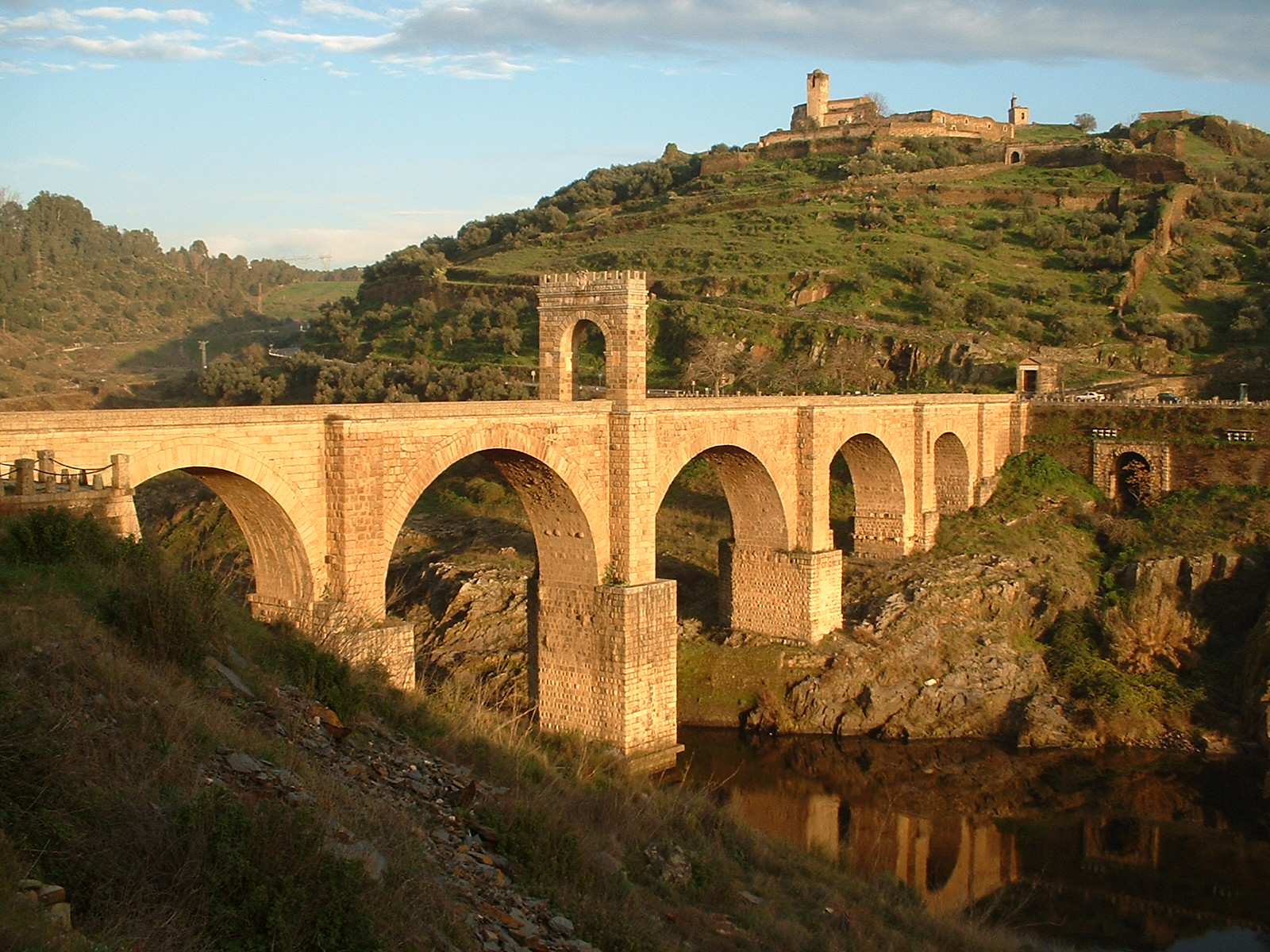
The Alcántara Bridge

The costs of building and repairing bridges, known as opus pontis ("bridge work"), were the responsibility of multiple local municipalities. Their shared costs prove Roman bridges belonged to the region overall, and not to any one town (or two, if on a border). The Alcántara Bridge in Lusitania, for example, was built at the expense of 12 local municipalities, whose names were added on an inscription. Later, in the Roman Empire, the local lords of the land had to pay tithes to the empire for opus pontis. The Anglo-Saxons continued this practice with bricg-geworc, a literal translation of opus pontis.

== Examples ==
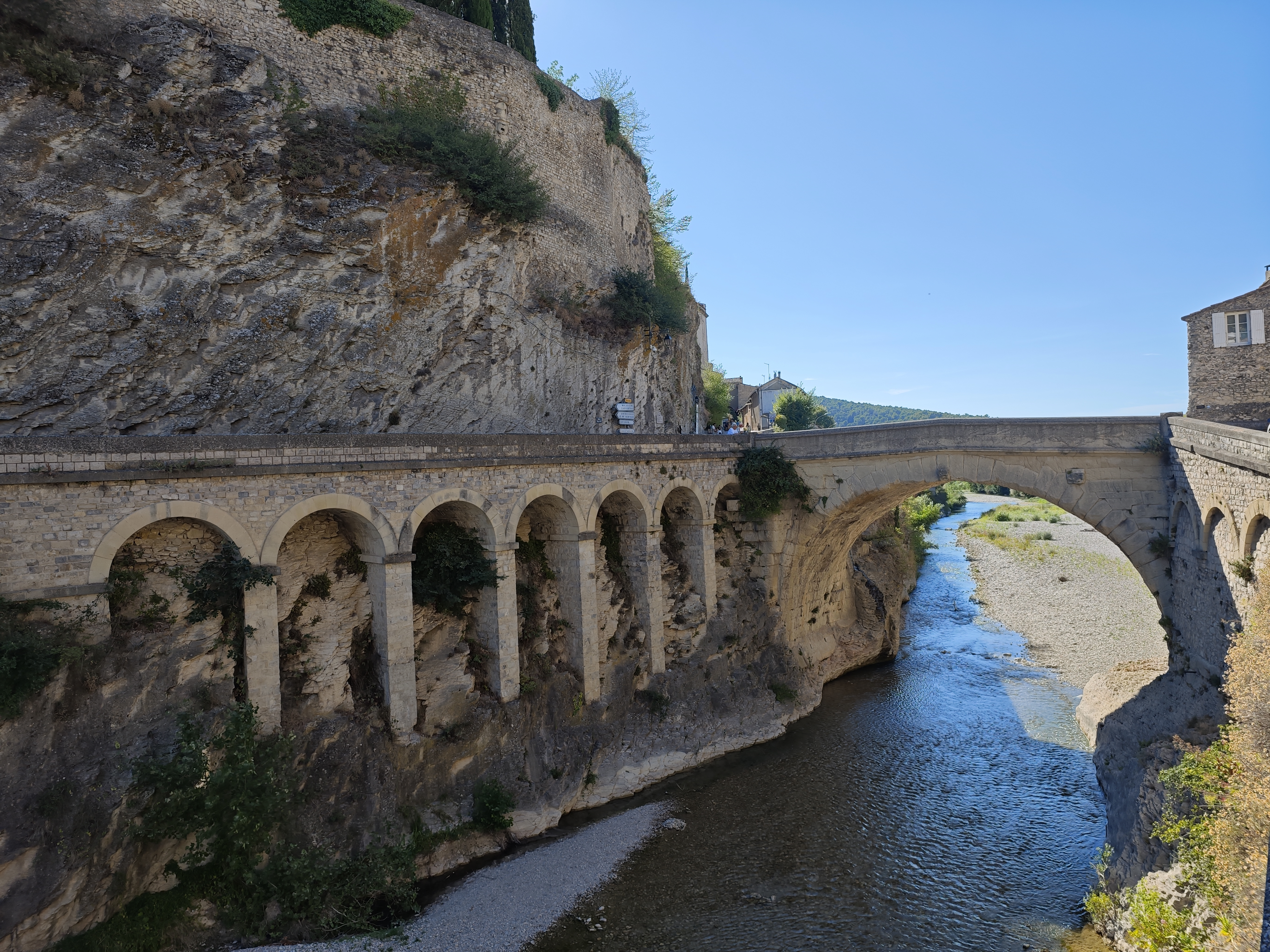
Roman bridge at Vaison-la-Romaine

Built in 142 BC, the Pons Aemilius, later named Ponte Rotto (broken bridge), is the oldest Roman stone bridge in Rome, with only one surviving arch and pier. However, evidence suggests only the abutment is original to the 2nd century BC while the arch and pier perhaps date to a reconstruction during the reign of Augustus (27 BC – 14 AD). The Pons Fabricius, built in 62 BC during the late Republic, is the oldest Roman bridge that is still intact and in use. The largest Roman bridge was Trajan's Bridge over the lower Danube, constructed by Apollodorus of Damascus, which remained for over a millennium the longest bridge to have been built both in terms of overall and span length.

=== Large river bridging ===
Roman engineers built stone arch or stone pillar bridges over all major rivers of the Empire save two: the Euphrates, which lay at the frontier in the Roman–Persian Wars, and the Nile, the longest river in the world, which was bridged as late as 1902 by the British Old Aswan Dam. The largest rivers to be spanned by solid bridges by the Romans were the Danube and the Rhine, the two largest European rivers west of the Eurasian Steppe. The lower Danube was crossed by least two (Trajan's Bridge, Constantine's Bridge) and the middle and lower Rhine by four different bridges (the Roman Bridge at Mainz, Caesar's Rhine bridges, the Roman Bridge at Koblenz, the Roman Bridge at Cologne). For rivers with strong currents and to allow swift army movements, pontoon bridges were also routinely employed. Judging by the distinct lack of records of pre-modern solid bridges spanning larger rivers, the Roman feat appears to be unsurpassed anywhere in the world until into the 19th century.

== See also ==
- List of Roman bridges
- Bridges in Rome
- Record-holding bridges in antiquity
- Roman architecture
- Roman architectural revolution
