= Alcantara =

Alcantara, Alcântara (Portuguese), Alcántara (Spanish), Alcàntara, Alcàntera, El-Qantarah and (El) Kantara are all transliterations of the Arabic word al-qantara (القنطرة), meaning "the bridge".

Alcantara may refer to:

== People ==
- Alcantara (surname)

== Places ==
=== Algeria ===
- El Kantara, town and commune in Biskra province
- El Kantara District, in Biskra province

=== Brazil ===
- Alcântara, Maranhão, city in the state of Maranhão
  - Alcântara Launch Center, Maranhão, satellite launch center
- Alcântara River, Rio de Janeiro state
- Barra d'Alcântara, municipality in the state of Piauí
- Dom Pedro de Alcântara, municipality in the state Rio Grande do Sul
- São Pedro de Alcântara, Santa Catarina, municipality

=== Chile ===
- The area near Alcántara metro station in northeastern Santiago

=== Cyprus ===
- Kantara Castle, in the Kyrenia mountains

=== Egypt ===
- El-Qantarah el-Sharqiyya, city in the governorate of Shamal Sina, on the eastern side of the Suez Canal

=== Italy ===
- Alcantara (river) (Alcàntara in Sicilian), a river of Sicily

=== Philippines ===
- Alcantara, Cebu, municipality in the province of Cebu
- Alcantara, Romblon, municipality in the province of Romblon

=== Portugal ===
- Alcântara, Lisbon, civil parish of Lisbon

- Alcântara Maritime Terminal, a former ocean liner terminal in Lisbon

- São Pedro de Alcântara, Franciscan monastery in Lisbon

=== Spain ===
- Tierra de Alcántara, comarca (district) located in the province of Cáceres, Extremadura
  - Alcántara, municipality in the province of Cáceres, Extremadura
    - Alcántara Dam, in Tagus river near the town with the same name
    - Alcántara Bridge, Roman bridge over the Tagus river near the town with the same name
  - Valencia de Alcántara, municipality in the province of Cáceres, Extremadura
  - Santiago de Alcántara, municipality in the province of Cáceres, Extremadura
  - Herrera de Alcántara, municipality in the province of Cáceres, Extremadura
  - Mata de Alcántara, municipality in the province of Cáceres, Extremadura
- Alcàntera de Xúquer (Spanish: Alcántara de Júcar), municipality in the comarca of Ribera Alta, Valencian Community
- San Pedro de Alcántara, town in the province of Málaga, Andalusia
- San Vicente de Alcántara, municipality in the province of Badajoz, Extremadura

=== Venezuela ===
- Francisco Linares Alcántara Municipality, municipality in Aragua state

== Other uses ==
- Alcantara (material), covering material manufactured by Alcantara SpA, Italy
- Alcantara (plant), a genus of plants in the family Asteraceae
- Battle of Alcantara (disambiguation)
- Order of Alcántara, Spanish military order founded in the 12th century
- RMS Alcantara (1913), British ocean liner of Royal Mail Steam Packet Company
- RMS Alcantara (1926), British ocean liner of Royal Mail Lines

== Cognate names ==
- Alcantarilla (diminutive of Alcántara), a municipality in Murcia, Spain
- Alcantarilha (diminutive of Alcântara), a parish in Portugal
