= Alcantar =

Alcantar and its original Spanish form Alcántar ([al.ˈkan.taɾ]) is a Spanish surname of moorish origin. It is a variant of Alcántara. The name is derived from that of the town of Alcántara, in the province of Cáceres, Extremadura, Spain. Ultimately, the name is derived from Arabic words meaning the bridge (Arabic: اَلْقَنْطَرَة, romanized: al-qanṭara), which in turn is a reference to an actual bridge.

Notable people with this surname include:

- Daniel Alcántar (born 1976), Mexican football player
- Norma A. Alcantar, Mexican-American chemical engineer
- Tony Alcantar (born 1960), American actor
- Angelina Alcantar, TV Host for Donut Media, Automotive Instructor at Riverside City College Automotive Program, ASE Master Certified
