= Alconétar Bridge =

Cultural property in Garrovillas de Alconétar, Spain

Alconétar Bridge (Note: All measurements refer to the time before the bridge relocation and are necessarily fragmentary because of the ruined state of the structure.) Puente de Alconétar
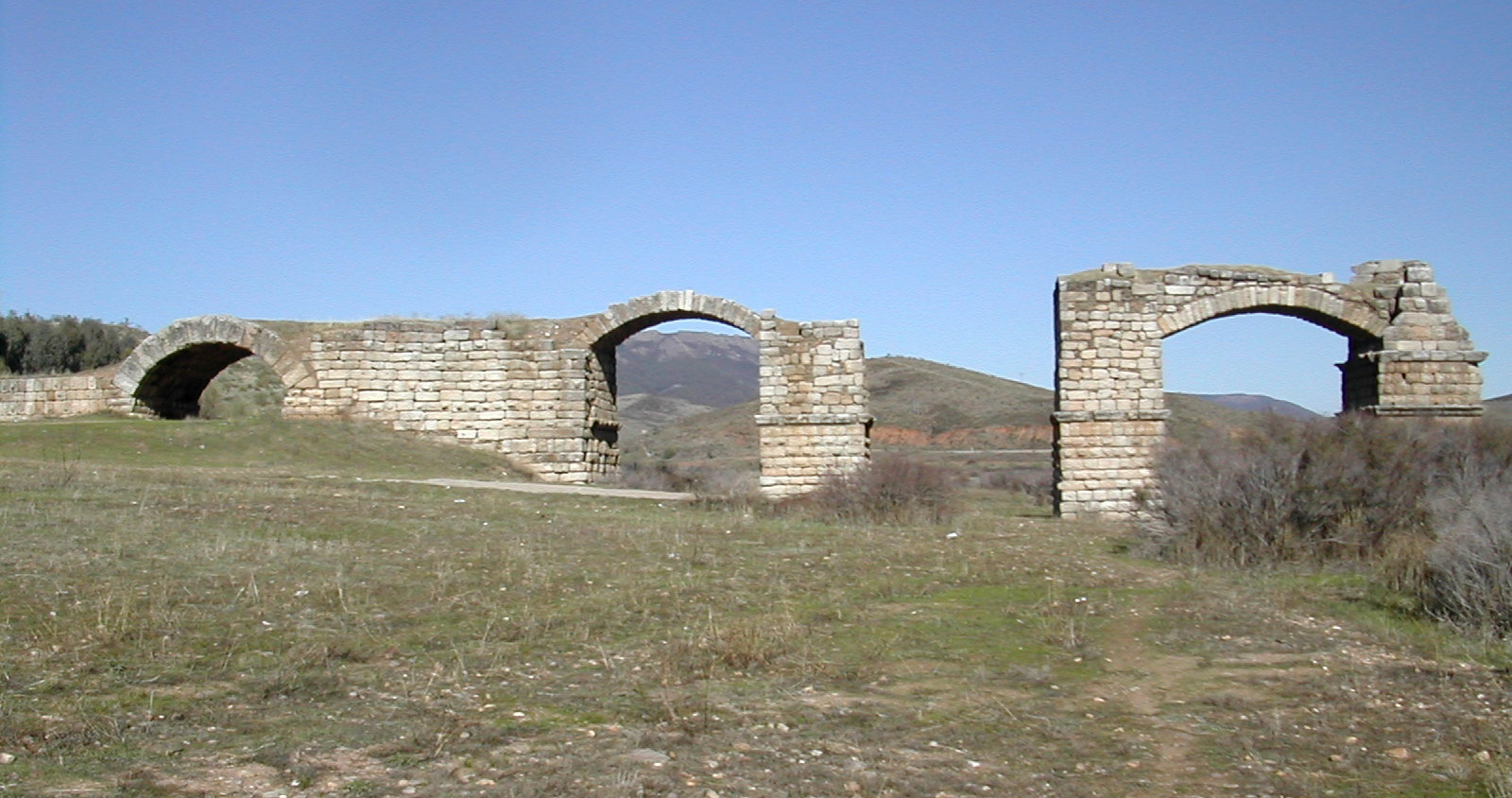
- Remains of the Alconétar Bridge with its flattened arches
- Coordinates: 39°45′14″N 6°26′14″W
- Crosses: Tagus
- Locale: Garrovillas de Alconétar, Cáceres Province, Extremadura, Spain
- Heritage status: Listed as cultural heritage of Spain

Characteristics
- Design: Segmental arch bridge
- Material: Stone, Roman concrete
- Total length: 290 m (950 ft) [incl. approaches]
- Width: 6.55–6.80 m (21.5–22.3 ft)
- Height: Minimum 12.50 m (41.0 ft)
- Longest span: 15 m (49 ft)
- No. of spans: Ca. 18 [incl. flood outlets]

History
- Designer: Possibly Apollodorus of Damascus
- Construction end: Probably reign of Trajan or Hadrian (98–138 AD)

Location
- Interactive map of Alconétar Bridge (Note: All measurements refer to the time before the bridge relocation and are necessarily fragmentary because of the ruined state of the structure.)

The Alconétar Bridge (Spanish: Puente de Alconétar), also known as Puente de Mantible, was a Roman segmental arch bridge in the Extremadura region, Spain. The ancient structure, which featured flattened arches with a span-to-rise ratio of 4–5:1, is one of the earliest of its kind. Its design suggests that the bridge was erected in the early 2nd century AD by the emperors Trajan or Hadrian, possibly under the guidance of Apollodorus of Damascus, the most famous architect of the time.

The almost 300 m long Alconétar Bridge served as a crossing point for the Roman Via de la Plata, the most important north–south connection in western Hispania, over the Tagus, the longest river of the Iberian Peninsula. It presumably remained in service until the Reconquista, after which numerous early modern reconstruction attempts by Spanish engineers failed. The ruins, which were mainly to be found on the right river bank, were relocated from their original position in 1970 when the Alcántara reservoir was created.

== Location and road access ==
Location of Alconétar Bridge within Roman road network in Hispania

The historic Alconétar Bridge, which should not be confused with the monumental Alcántara Bridge further downstream, spanned the Tagus not far from the mouth of the Almonte, in the heart of the Spanish Cáceres Province in the Extremadura region. A modern motorway and a railway, which cross the Tagus in the immediate vicinity, underline the historical importance of this crossing point between northern and southern Spain. During the building of the Alcántara Dam in 1970, the remains of the bridge were moved from their original site to a meadow six kilometers to the north, close to the municipality of Garrovillas de Alconétar. By contrast, few traces are left of the neighbouring ancient bridge over the river Almonte.

In the classical period, the Alconétar Bridge was part of the Roman road Iter ab Emerita Caesaraugustam, that was later called Via de la Plata. This important inner Iberian connection led from the provincial capital Mérida in the south, through the river valleys of Alagón, Tiétar and Tagus to the north, then on to the western part of Meseta Central, passing the major town of Salamanca. Its terminal point was Astorga in north-western Spain. The Via de la Plata was one of the four main routes which were established by Augustus (30 BC–14 AD) and his successors for military control of the peninsula and for facilitating the exploitation of the rich Spanish silver and gold mines.

Apart from the junction over the Tagus, the remains of four other ancient bridges can be found along the road: one over the Albarregas, another over the Aljucén, a third close to Caparra and a fourth over the Tormes. In the hills overlooking the Alconétar Bridge, a Roman mansio with the name of Turmulus (Spanish: "Ad Túrmulos") was established, according to the then customary distance intervals. It was the fourth of a total number of sixteen between Mérida and Astorga.

== History ==
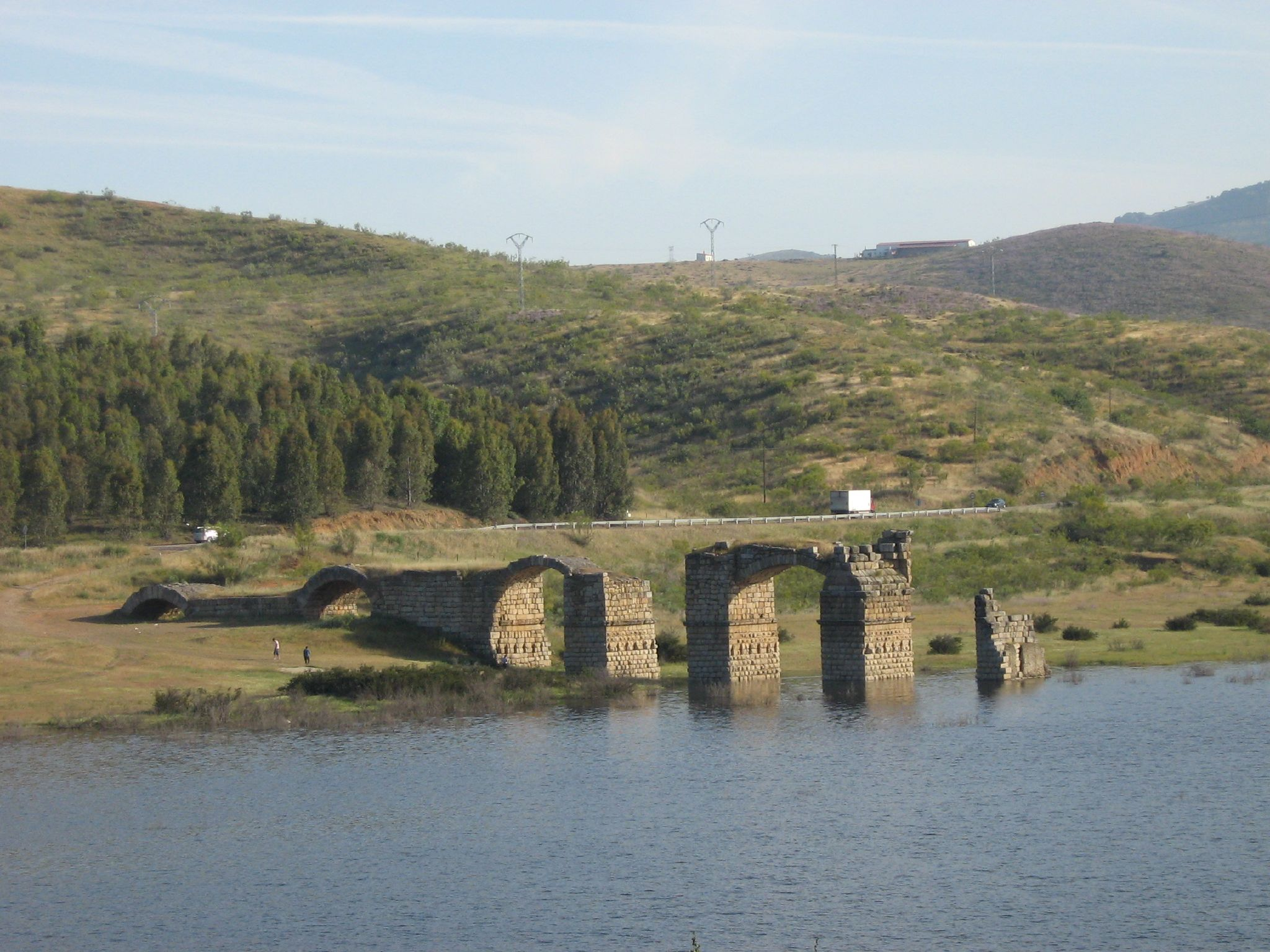
The relocated remains during a flood

The exact construction date of the Puente de Alconétar is unknown because of missing literary and epigraphic sources. Its segmental arches suggest that it was built in the early 2nd century AD, more specifically during the reign of the emperors Trajan (98–117 AD) or Hadrian (117–138 AD), as the use of this arch form was typical of that era. Both rulers were born in the southern Spanish province of Baetica and Trajan is known to have ordered the restoration of the Iter ab Emerita Caesaraugustam when he came to power. Segmental arches were often employed by Trajan's court architect Apollodorus of Damascus, such as in Trajan's Forum and most notably in the greatest civil engineering achievement of its time, Trajan's Bridge, which rested on twenty huge concrete piers and was used during the Dacian Wars for moving troops across the more than 1,000 m (3,300 ft) wide Danube.

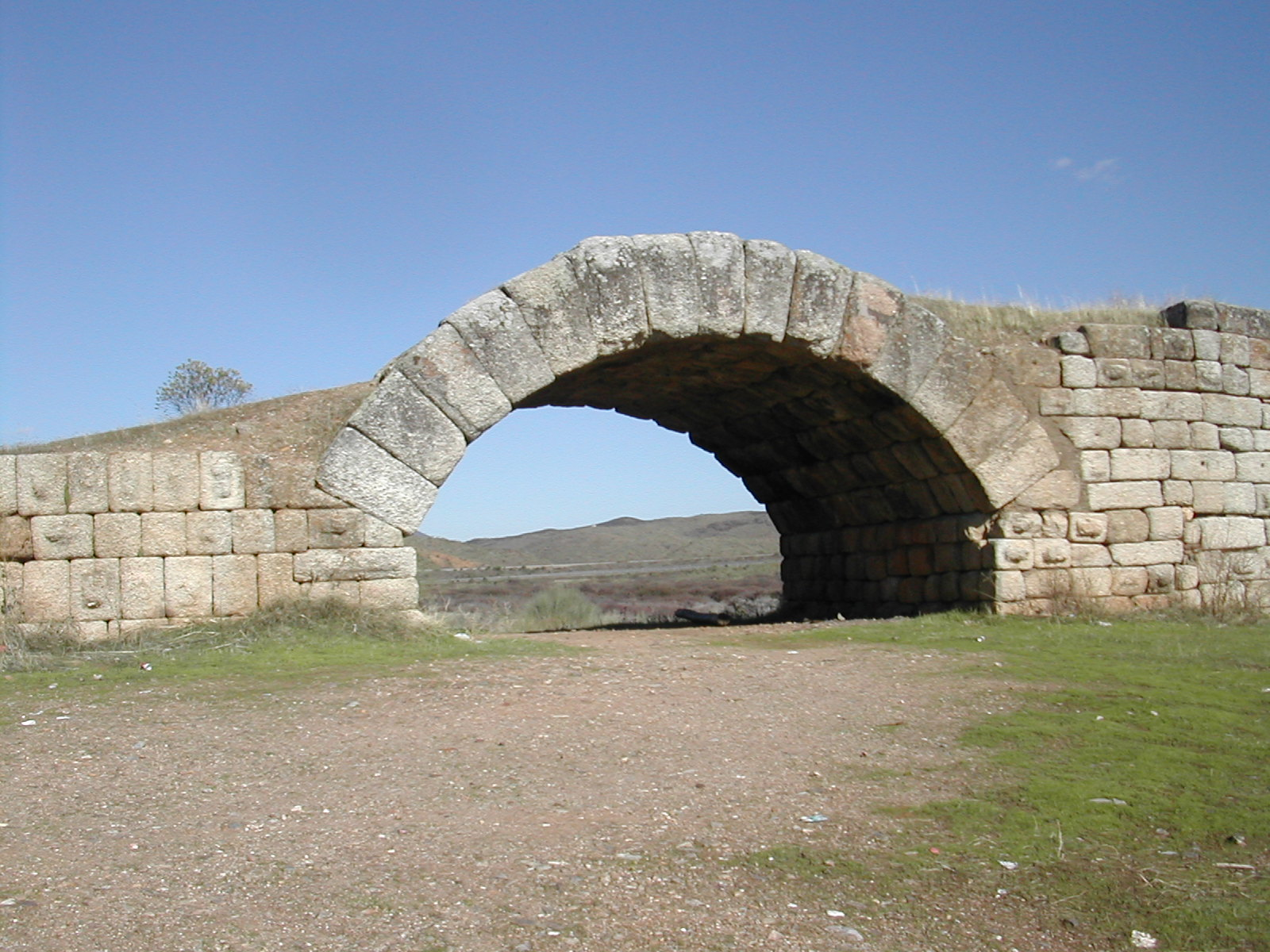
2nd floodway. The arch thickness is 1.20 m.

Moorish geographers make no mention of the Alconétar Bridge, even though they praise the Roman bridge of Alcántara which also leads across the Tagus. There is some evidence that a community called Alconétar, Alconétara or Alcontra (Arabic: "small bridge") existed at least temporarily – probably an indirect reference to the high-rising bridge of Alcántara. It also remains unknown why the bridge of Alconétar is called Puente de Mantible in the local vernacular, an expression which alludes to the legend of Charlemagne and his Twelve Paladins.

The bridge was probably in use until the time of the Reconquista, when the Tagus constituted the border between the Christian and the Moorish realm from the 11th to the 13th century, and the frequent clashes might have easily made the ancient bridge unusable. According to another theory, the water could have begun to wash away the ancient foundations at the time.

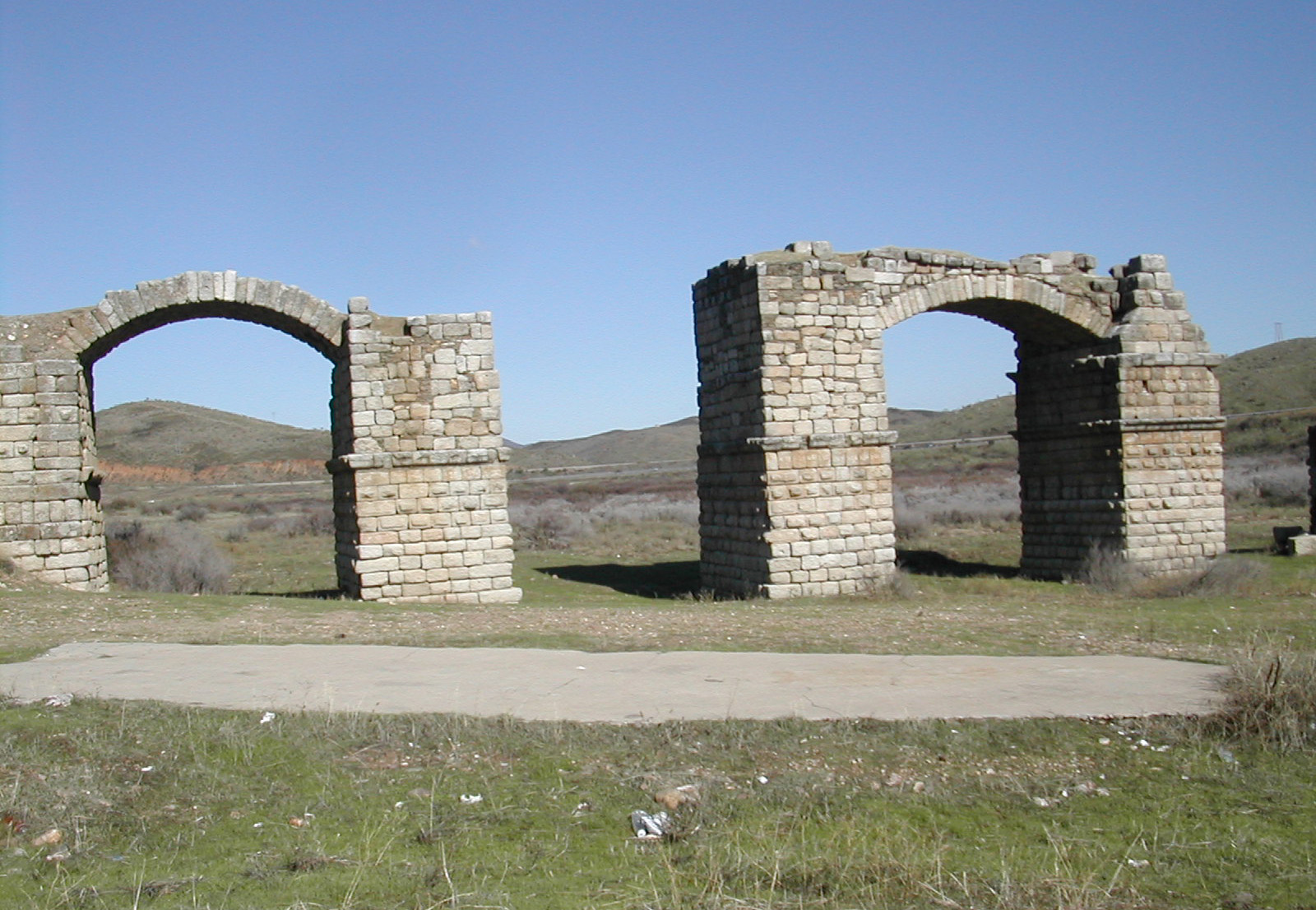
The two arches 1 and 3, reconstructed in later times

The Alconétar Bridge first appears in records in 1231 and, again, in 1257, when it is explicitly referred to as being in use. It was probably repaired by the Knights Templar who had taken control of the bridge as well as the village in the meantime. The extant arches 1 and 3, both of which are not of Roman fabric, are assumed to date back to this period. Around 1340, however, the bridge was apparently unusable again, so that a ferry service was established to cross the river, which is also recorded at later times. On the site of the ancient way station, a fortress was erected in the Middle Ages; its tower built of Roman spolia emerges from the Alcántara reservoir at low water.

Several attempts to reopen the bridge in the early modern era proved unsuccessful. In 1553, the architect Rodrigo Gil de Hontañón calculated a cost of 80,000 Ducats for the reconstruction of the bridge without ever realising his plans. The construction project of Alonso de Covarrubias and Hernán Ruiz of 1560 never went beyond the planning stage, and neither did another project between 1569 and 1580.

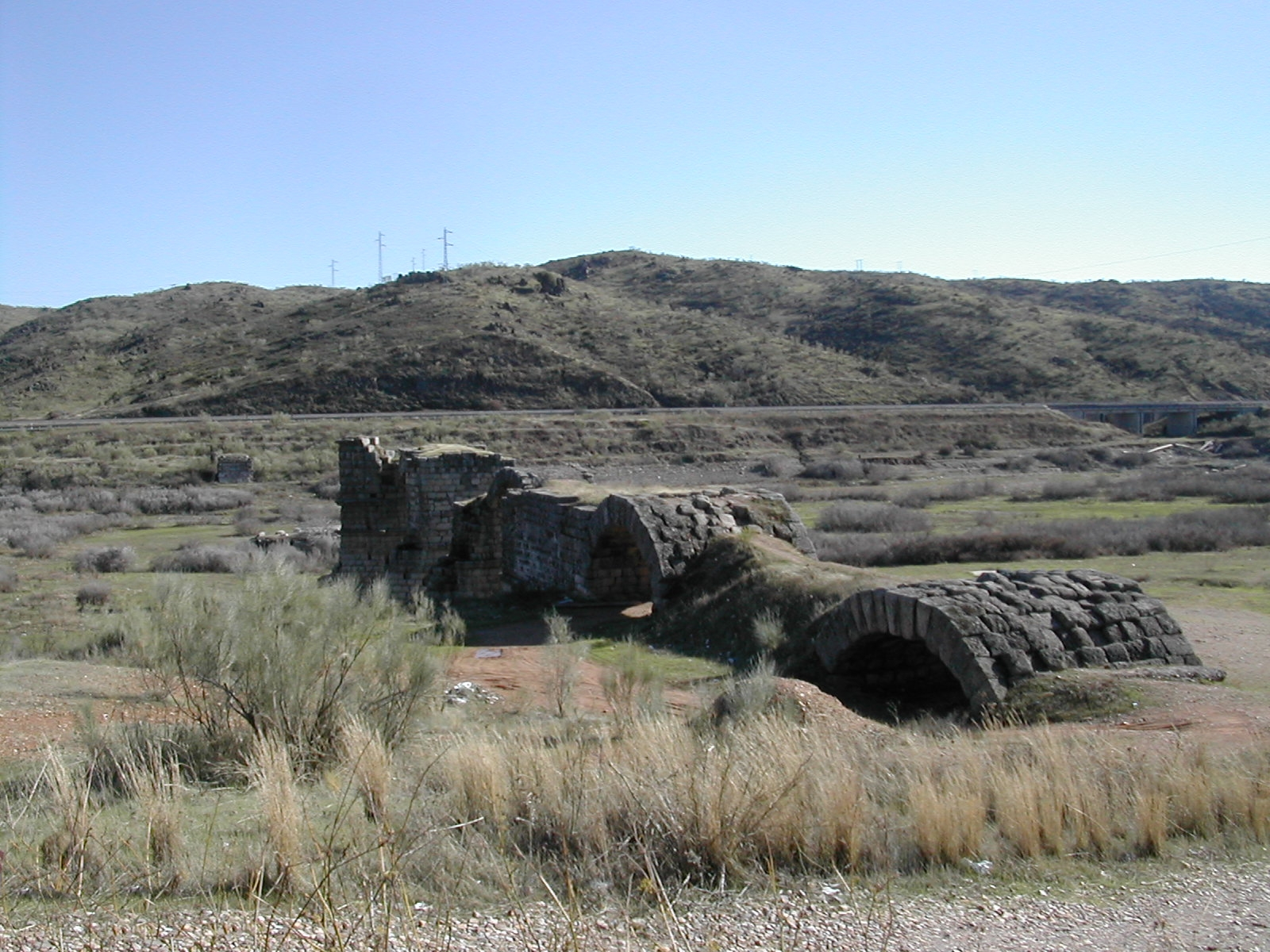
In the foreground the two Roman flood openings 1 and 2

In the 18th century two further attempts to repair the bridge failed, in 1730 and 1760–70. The latter plan of the military engineer José García Galiano included a complete reconstruction with three large-span segmental arches. The planning sketch shows that already at that time the remaining arches were limited to the right bank, a finding confirmed by the drawing of Fernando Rodríguez from 1797 and engravings in Alexandre de Labordes' Voyage pittoresque de l'Espagne a few years later. The reconstruction sketch produced by Rodriguez (see diagram below) shows the profile of the bridge, rising evenly and dominated by three central arches in the centre of the river. These arches are flanked by a further nine segmental arches on both sides. The symmetry of the arches suggests that, in lieu of the fortification on the right bank viewed upstream, there might have been another segmental arch in Roman times.

The basis for the modern scientific analysis of the bridge was laid out by the civil engineer Antonio Prieto in his 1925 survey, which details the condition of the bridge before its relocation in 1970. Although this was a serious attempt to reconstruct the bridge as close to the original as possible, the Spanish scholar Durán points out that slight changes to the main body can never be avoided in the course of such a difficult undertaking.

The Alconétar Bridge has been classified as "historical heritage" since 1931 by the Spanish authorities.

== Construction ==
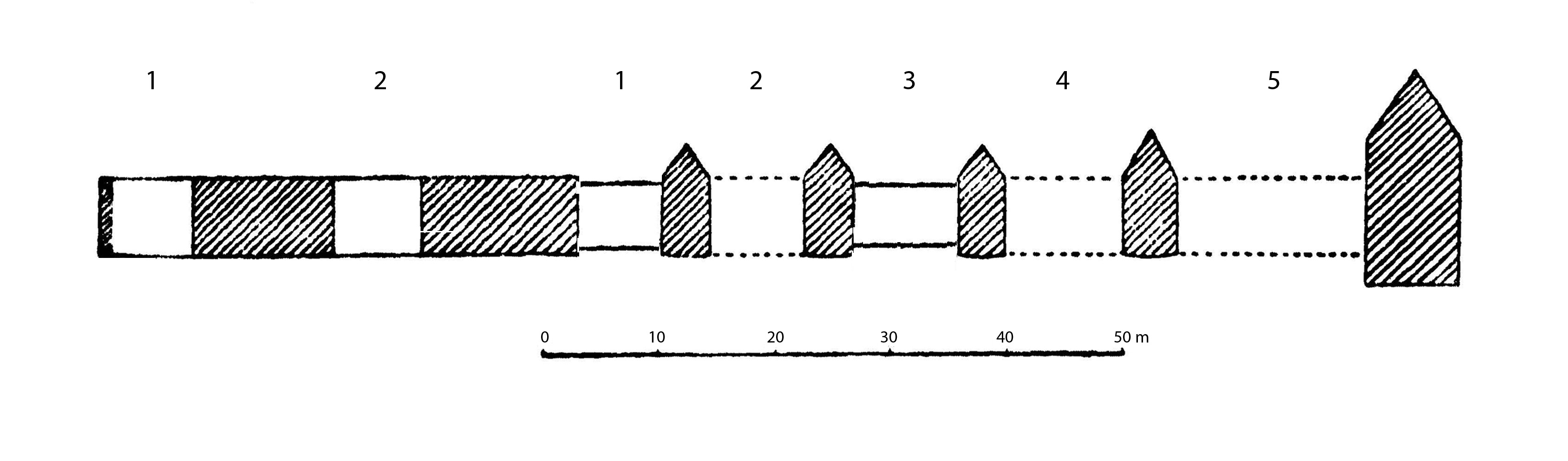
Ground plan of the extant bridge section

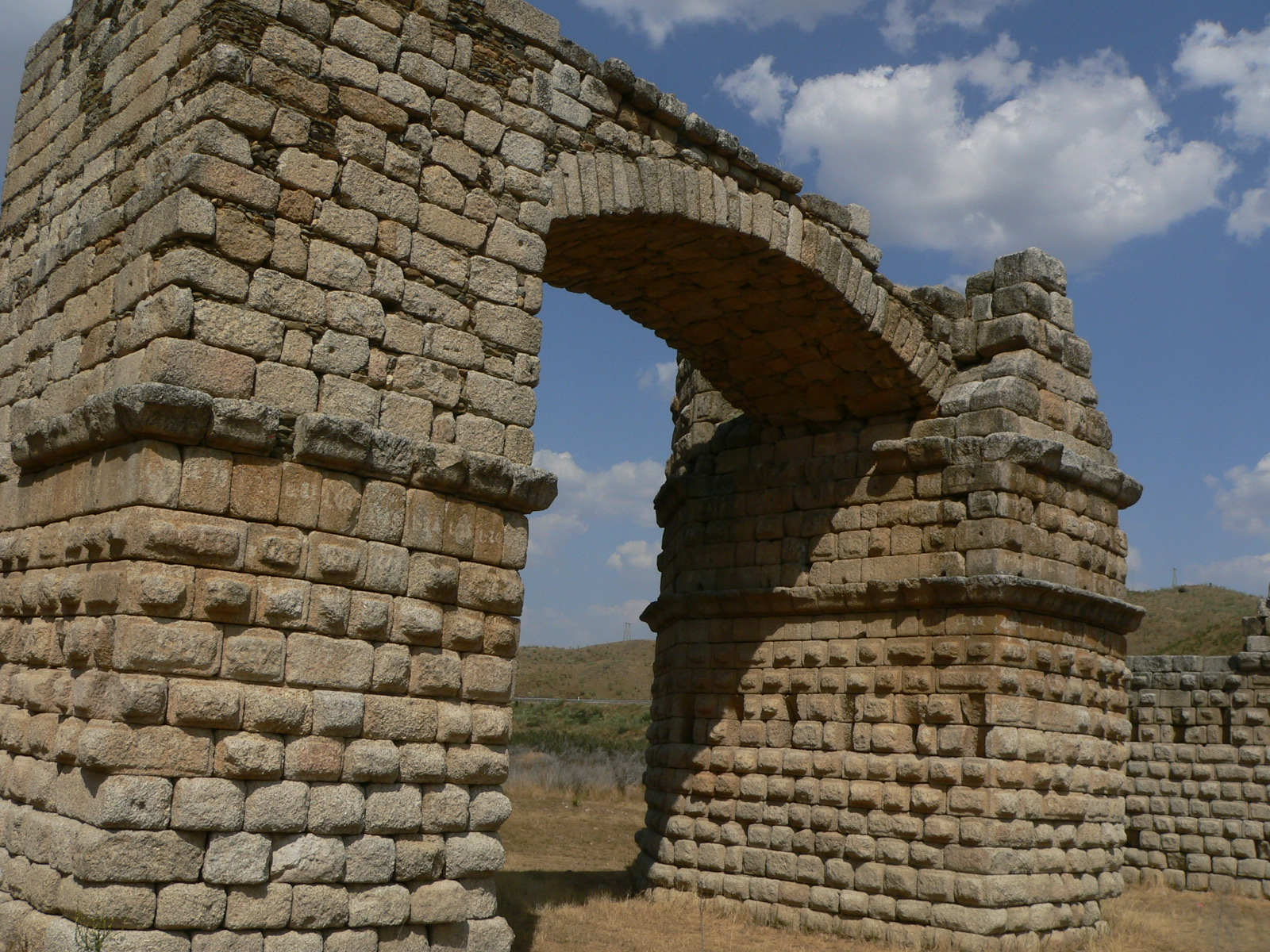
Arch no. 3. The right pier, no. 3, preserves the sloping support for the Roman segmental arch.

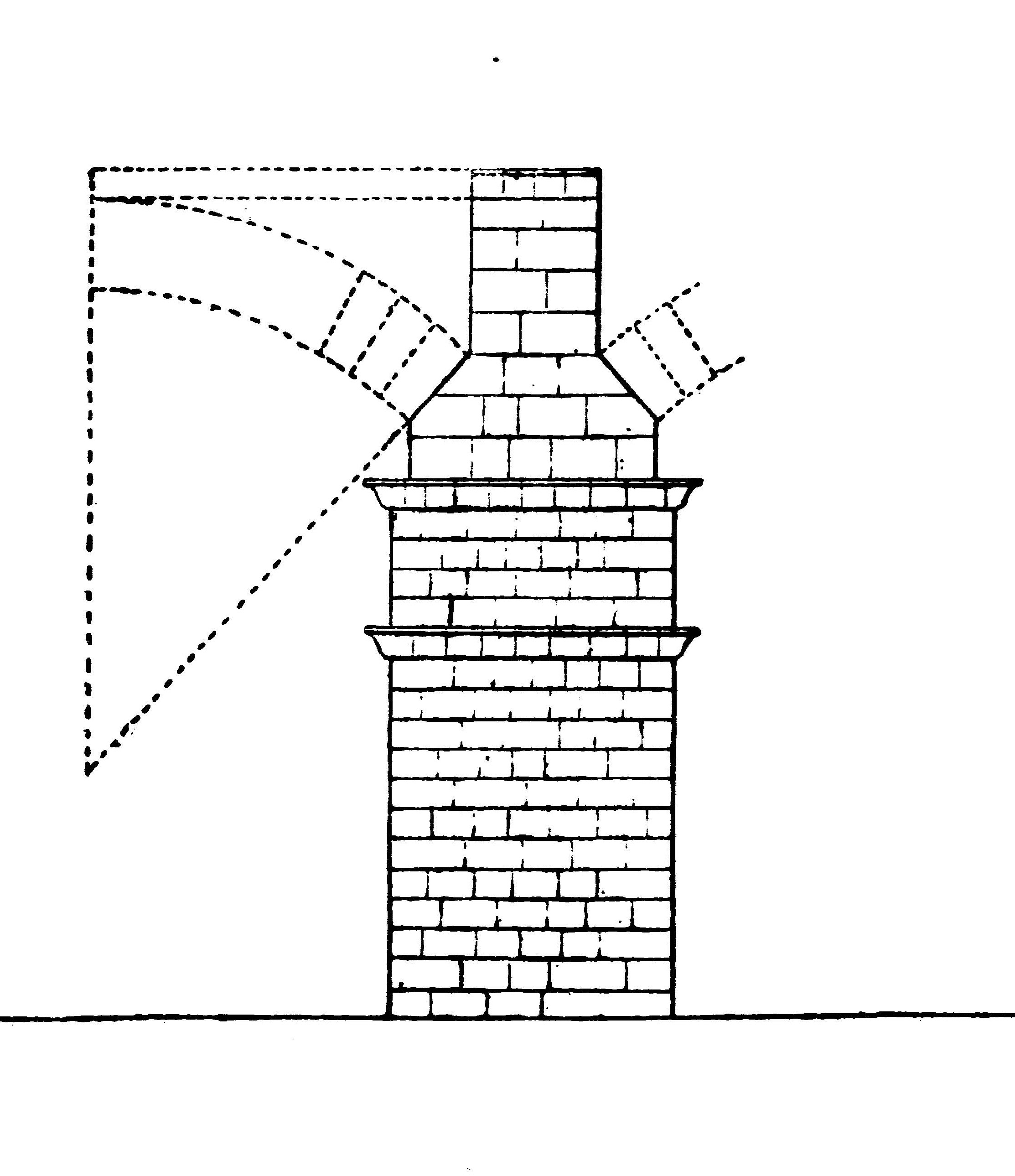
Elevation of pier no. 3: by using the degree of curvature of the originally preserved supports for the arch, the span-to-rise ratio of the ancient segmental arches can be calculated.

Main feature of the Alconétar Bridge was the segmental shape of its arches, which were rather uncommon in ancient bridge building: in a survey of Roman bridges in Hispania, only one in ten showed the same characteristics, the vast majority being of semi-circular design. According to Prieto, the bridge had sixteen arches, not including the flood openings on the right approach, with the following spans (estimates are in square brackets):

- Meters: 7.30 – 8.20 – 9 – 10.15 – [11 – 12 – 13 – 14 – 15 – 14] – 13 – 12 – 11 – [10] – 9.30 – 9.10

(Feet: 24.0 – 26.9 – 30 – 33.3 – [36 – 39 – 43 – 46 – 49 – 46] – 43 – 39 – 36 – [33] – 30.5 – 29.9.)

Other sources however vary from eleven to fifteen arches. The total length of the rectilinear structure was 290 m (950 ft), of which 190 m (620 ft) spanned the riverbed at low water. If one adds the clear span of the arches and assumes, on the basis of the preserved piers, an average pier thickness of 4.4 m (14 ft), then the distance between both bridge ramps was 244 m (801 ft) (= 178 + 15 x 4.4), which corresponded to a river cross section of 73%. By comparison, the corresponding discharge profiles for the Roman bridges of Córdoba, of Mérida and Salamanca were 62%, 64% and 80% respectively.

Most of the surviving fabric was concentrated on the right bank of the Tagus where the current was less strong; a number of pier stumps rose just above the water surface in the middle of the river, whilst on the left bank a further two piers remained standing, next to which the left abutment followed. The parts of the bridge moved to a safe place were essentially (see images): the right bridge ramp with its two arch-shaped flood openings, the piers 1, 2, and 3 with the remains of 4 and 6, as well as the vaults 1 and 3. The other scarce remains were submerged by the flooding of the Alcantara reservoir in 1970.

The approach to the ramp is 42 m (138 ft) long and 6.55–6.80 m (21.5–22.3 ft) wide. The clear spans of its two segmental arches are 6.95 m (22.8 ft) and 7.40 m (24.3 ft), which corresponds to a span-to-rise ratio of 4.0 and 3.3 to 1 respectively. The accurately fitting inclined contact surface of the springings clearly proves the Roman origin of these arches. With an extraordinary width of 1.20 m (3 ft 11 in), the voussoirs appear oversized in relation to the span (arch slenderness of 1:5.8 and 6.2 respectively). In contrast, the two surviving bridge arches no. 1 and 3 are instable substitutions, made of carelessly laid rubble. The date of these arches is unknown, as with all other repairs; possibly they were built in the period of the Knights Templar.

Equally evidently of post-classical origin is the masonry of the first two piers above the lower cornice, which projects from all piers at the same height. The superstructure of these piers could have been reconstructed for a drawbridge or a tower, which, according to an illustration in the Voyage Pittoresque, rested upon pier 2. In contrast, the third pier has still preserved its original Roman character up to the top at 12.50 m (41.0 ft). Its carefully worked ashlar and the second cornice, which ran along all ancient piers, provide us with the most distinct impression of the original shape of the Roman bridge.

In particular, it is possible to reconstruct relatively precisely the rise of the Roman segmental arches on the basis of the angles of the inclined stone supports at the springing level. Thus, the third arch originally described a circular sector of 95°, which points to a span-to-rise ratio of about 4–5 to 1 for the other segmental arches. This value is supported by de Labordes' engravings which depict an intact Roman segmental arch spanning the adjoining fourth bay as late as the early 19th century. Along with other early examples, such as Limyra Bridge and the Ponte San Lorenzo, the Alconétar Bridge therefore ranks among the oldest segmental arched bridges in the world. Its existence demonstrates that, in contrast to what had previously been widely believed and taught, Roman bridge builders possessed intimate knowledge of flattened arches.

The pier thicknesses, measuring 4.25 m (13.9 ft), 4.45 m (14.6 ft) and 4.55 m (14.9 ft), increase slightly towards the middle of the river, while the distances between the piers increase from 7.30 m (24.0 ft) to 10.20 m (33.5 ft). The fifth and ultimate pier, which carries the distinctive nickname "Bishop's table", takes an advanced position in the riverbed and possesses by far the largest cross-section (8.10 m (26.6 ft)). It may be of medieval origin and could have served as a base for a watchtower, replacing two ancient arches. All five piers are strengthened on the upstream face by pointed cutwaters.

The facing of the piers consists of local granite ashlar, set in parallel courses without the use of mortar or iron ties (opus quadratum); their interior, as those of the ramps, was filled with Roman concrete, a common method applied for Roman bridges. Outwardly, the flattened arches must have lent the bridge a rather elongated appearance, with its roadway following a horizontal or slightly convex line.

== Reconstruction and measurements ==
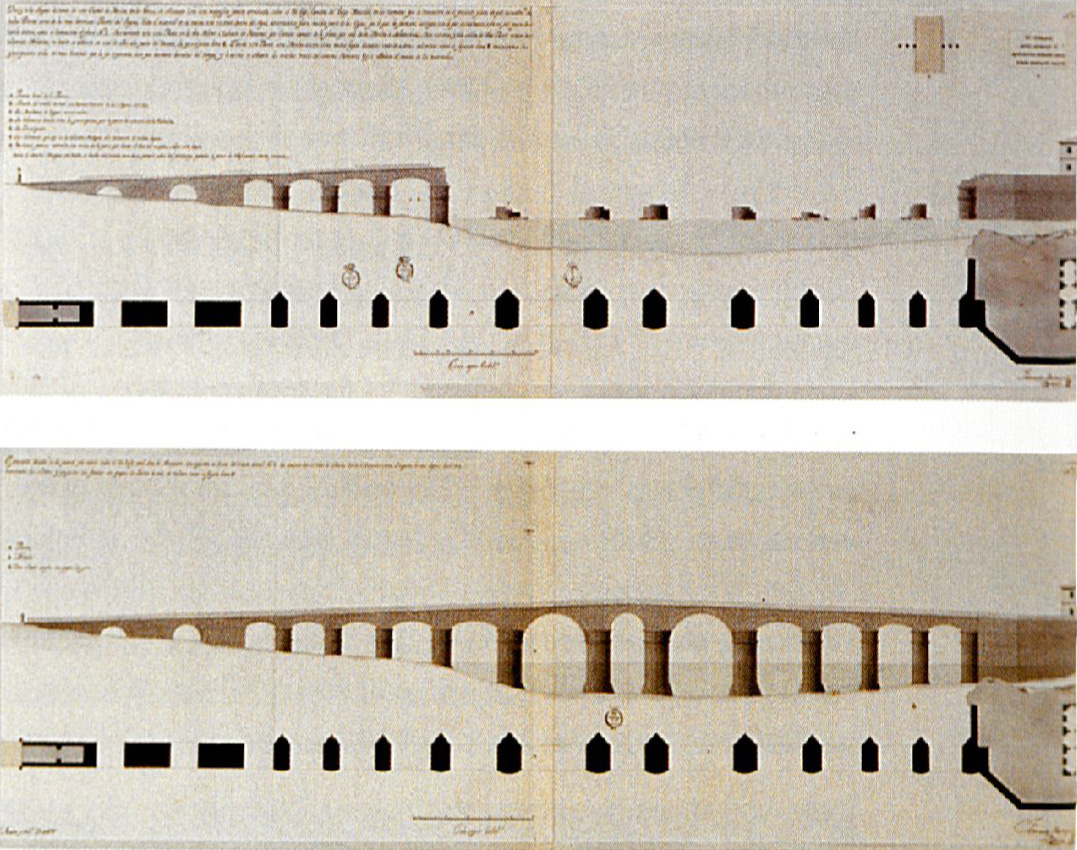
18th century elevation and ground plan by Fernando Rodríguez (view upstream). Above the bridge as of 1797, below his reconstruction attempt of the original Roman structure.

Recorded measurements from left to right bank (viewed upstream):

| Bridge part | Galiano (ca. 1770) | Rodríguez (1797) | Prieto (1925) (Note: Estimated values in italics.) | Durán (2004) (Note: All values refer to the relocated bridge.) |
|---|---|---|---|---|
| Span 1st floodway | 6.86 m (22.5 ft) | 7.04 m (23.1 ft) | 7.00 m (22.97 ft) | 6.95 m (22.8 ft) |
| Ramp thickness | 10.60 m (34.8 ft) | 11.63 m (38.2 ft) | 12.00 m (39.37 ft) | 14.00 m (45.93 ft) |
| Span 2nd floodway | 7.40 m (24.3 ft) | 7.10 m (23.3 ft) | 7.50 m (24.6 ft) | 7.40 m (24.3 ft) |
| Ramp thickness | 12.90 m (42.3 ft) | 11.65 m (38.2 ft) | 13.00 m (42.65 ft) | 13.50 m (44.3 ft) |
| Span 1st arch | 7.50 m (24.6 ft) | 7.62 m (25.0 ft) | 7.30 m (24.0 ft) | 7.30 m (24.0 ft) |
| Thickness 1st pier | 5.60 m (18.4 ft) | 4.17 m (13.7 ft) | 4.25 m (13.9 ft) | 4.25 m (13.9 ft) |
| Span 2nd arch | 9.00 m (29.53 ft) | 8.44 m (27.7 ft) | 8.20 m (26.9 ft) | 8.10 m (26.6 ft) |
| Thickness 2nd pier | 5.60 m (18.4 ft) | 4.19 m (13.7 ft) | 4.25 m (13.9 ft) | 4.45 m (14.6 ft) |
| Span 3rd arch | 9.86 m (32.3 ft) | 8.92 m (29.3 ft) | 8.95 m (29.4 ft) | 8.50 m (27.9 ft) |
| Thickness 3rd pier | 5.50 m (18.0 ft) | 4.21 m (13.8 ft) | 4.25 m (13.9 ft) | 4.55 m (14.9 ft) |
| Span 4th arch | 10.10 m (33.1 ft) | 10.32 m (33.9 ft) | 10.15 m (33.3 ft) | 10.20 m (33.5 ft) |
| Thickness 4th pier | | 4.81 m (15.8 ft) | 4.80 m (15.7 ft) | |
| Span 5th arch | | 12.03 m (39.5 ft) | 11.00 m (36.09 ft) | |
| Thickness 5th pier | | 6.21 m (20.4 ft) | | |
| Span 6th arch | | 16.72 m (54.9 ft) | 12.00 m (39.37 ft) | |
| Thickness 6th pier | | 6.21 m (20.4 ft) | | |
| Span 7th arch | | 8.92 m (29.3 ft) | 13.00 m (42.65 ft) | |
| Thickness 7th pier | | 6.21 m (20.4 ft) | | |
| Span 8th arch | | 16.74 m (54.9 ft) | 14.00 m (45.93 ft) | |
| Thickness 8th pier | | 6.21 m (20.4 ft) | | |
| Span 9th arch | | 11.93 m (39.1 ft) | 15.00 m (49.21 ft) | |
| Thickness 9th pier | | 4.79 m (15.7 ft) | | |
| Span 10th arch | | 10.22 m (33.5 ft) | 14.00 m (45.93 ft) | |
| Thickness 10th pier | | 4.19 m (13.7 ft) | | |
| Span 11th arch | | 8.82 m (28.9 ft) | 13.00 m (42.65 ft) | |
| Thickness 11th pier | | 4.19 m (13.7 ft) | | |
| Span 12th arch | | 8.38 m (27.5 ft) | 12.00 m (39.37 ft) | |
| Thickness 12th pier | | 4.19 m (13.7 ft) | | |
| Span 13th arch | | | 11.00 m (36.09 ft) | |
| Thickness 13th pier | | | | |
| Span 14th arch | | | 10.00 m (32.81 ft) | |
| Thickness 14th pier | | | | |
| Span 15th arch | | | 9.30 m (30.5 ft) | |
| Thickness 15th pier | | | | |
| Span 16th arch | | | 9.10 m (29.9 ft) | |

== Video ==
- Alconetar Bridge - Construction Process: new bridge

== See also ==
- List of Roman bridges
- Limyra Bridge

== Sources ==
- Durán Fuentes, Manuel (2004), La Construcción de Puentes Romanos en Hispania, Santiago de Compostela: Xunta de Galicia, pp. 181–87, ISBN 978-84-453-3937-4
- Fernández Casado, Carlos (1970), Historia del Puente en Espania. Puentes Romanos: Puente de Alconétar, Madrid: Instituto Eduardo Torroja de la Construcción y del Cemento without page numbers
- Galliazzo, Vittorio (1994), I ponti romani. Catalogo generale, vol. 2, Treviso: Edizioni Canova, pp. 358–361 (No. 755), ISBN 88-85066-66-6
- Gil Montes, Juan (2004), "Elementos de la Ingeniería Romana "Via Delapidata"", Las Obras Públicas Romanas, Tarragona: Congreso Europeo
- González Limón, Teresa; et al. (2001), "A Brief Analysis of the Roman Bridges of the Way "La via de la Plata"", in Lourenço, P. B.; Roca, P. (eds.), Historical Constructions (PDF), Guimarães, pp. 247–256
- O'Connor, Colin (1993), Roman Bridges, Cambridge University Press, pp. 108f. (SP20), 171, ISBN 0-521-39326-4
- Prieto Vives, Antonio (May–Aug 1925), "El Puente Romano de Alconétar", Archivo Español de Arte y Arqueología, 2: 147–158
