= Alcantara (surname) =

Alcántara (Spanish), Alcàntara (Catalan), Alcântara (Portuguese), and Alcantara (Sicilian) are surnames related to the Andalusian place name Alcántara, derived from Arabic for "the bridge".

There are several related place named Alcantara, with the most noted being Alcántara, Spain, the birthplace of Saint Peter of Alcantara, the Franciscan Saint. The surname has also been identified among some Sephardic Jewish families, particularly those who adopted place-based surnames during or after the expulsion from Spain in 1492.

The surname has royal connections and the emperors of Brazil, such as Pedro II had the surname Alcântara e Silva. Consequently, the surname Alcântara is also found among descendants of freed slaves of the Brazilian imperial household.

== Spanish ==
- Arismendy Alcántara – Dominican baseball player
- Francisco Linares Alcántara – Venezuelan statesman
- Izzy Alcántara – Dominican baseball player
- José Eduardo Martínez Alcántara - Peruvian/Mexican chess player
- Paulino Alcántara – Filipino footballer who made much of his career in Spain
- Pedro Alcántara Herrán – Colombian statesman
- Peter of Alcantara [Spanish : San Pedro de Alcántara] (1499–1562) – canonized Spanish saint
- Raúl Alcántara – Dominican baseball player
- Reinier Alcántara – footballer born in Cuba who fled to the United States in 2008
- Roberto Alcántara – Mexican CEO of airline Viva Aerobus
- Sandy Alcántara – Dominican baseball player
- Sergio Alcántara – Dominican baseball player

== Portuguese ==
- Antônio Castilho de Alcântara Machado — Brazilian journalist, politician and writer
- Fabrício Lopes Alcântara — Brazilian footballer
- Fernando Lopes Alcântara — Brazilian footballer
- Fábio Lopes Alcântara — Brazilian footballer
- Hugo Alcântara — Brazilian footballer
- Ildemar Alcântara (born 1982) — Brazilian mixed martial artist
- Iuri Alcântara (born 1980) — Brazilian mixed martial artist
- José Pedro de Alcântara — Brazilian cofounder of Conceição de Ipanema town, Minas Gerais
- Monalysa Alcântara — Miss Brasil 2017
- Pedro de Alcântara, Prince of Grão Para (1875–1940) — member of the Brazilian imperial family
- Rafael Alcântara — Brazilian-Spanish footballer
- Roberto Alcântara Ballesteros — Brazilian footballer
- Thiago Alcântara — Spanish-Brazilian footballer, older brother of Rafael Alcântara
- Baltasar Lopes da Silva — writer, poet and linguist from Cape Verde who sometimes used the pseudonym Osvaldo Alcântara

== Filipino ==
- Kyline Alcantara – Filipina actress and singer

== United States ==
- Theo Alcántara - Spanish-born conductor of orchestra and opera

== See also ==
- Alcantara (disambiguation)
