= University of South Florida College of Engineering =

Coordinates: 28.0545°N 82.4130°W

The University of South Florida (USF) College of Engineering consists of seven ABET accredited learning disciplines at the public research university's main campus located in Tampa, Florida. The college has 11 undergraduate degree programs in biomedical engineering, chemical engineering, civil engineering, computer science, cybersecurity, electrical engineering, environmental engineering, industrial engineering, information technology, and mechanical engineering.

== History ==
=== 1960s ===
In late 1962, USF Founding President John S. Allen asked for the State University System to consider a school of engineering. On October 19, 1962, the Florida State Board of Control granted "tentative approval" for the establishment of an engineering school at USF, placing the project at the bottom of the Board's list of priorities for the following academic year. The following year, the Board of Control requested that a College of Engineering be added to USF's curriculum.

In February 1963, the Governor's Conference on Higher Education recommended a college of engineering be established at USF, saying the school's undergraduate programs "urgently need strengthening" as part of the urgency for space-age research and the school's proximity to NASA's Cape Canaveral.

The USF College of Engineering was established in 1964. In 1965, the Florida cabinet approved a $682,737 grant to build USF's first engineering building and construction began later that year. The $1.7 million engineering complex was dedicated February 25, 1967, with remarks from USF President John S. Allen and Westinghouse Electric Corporation Executive Vice President R.E. Kirby. The complex consisted of two buildings: the College of Engineering Teaching Auditorium (ENA) and Engineering Building I (Edgar W Kopp Building aka ENG).

=== 1970s ===
The inaugural Engineering Expo was held February 23 and 24, 1973. The event, billed as Engineering Expo ‘73, opened the college’s spaces to the public and brought in representatives from engineering businesses to introduce students to the importance of engineering and the opportunities the industry has.

=== 1980s ===
Leadership at the USF College of Engineering underwent a change in 1979 when Glenn A. Burdick became the College of Engineering’s second dean, serving until 1986. He is credited with securing funding for the Engineering II building, which bears his name and with establishing the Center for Urban Transportation Research, which opened in 1988, and the Department of Computer Science and Engineering, which was established in 1980. The College of Engineering added the Department of Chemical and Biomedical Engineering in 1981.

Michael Kovac became the College of Engineering’s third dean in 1986, serving until 1999.

In 1987, Engineering II (ENB) building opened. The building was formally named Glenn A. Burdick Hall after the college’s second dean.

=== 2000s ===
In 2001, Louis Martin-Vega became the fourth dean of the College of Engineering and the third building, Engineering Building III (ENC), opened for instruction.

Also in 2001, the college's Nanotechnology Research and Education Center (NREC) opened, offering interdisciplinary research capabilities to the university.

John Wiencek became the fifth dean of the College of Engineering in 2007.

=== 2010s ===
In 2013, Robert Bishop was named the sixth dean of the College of Engineering.

Dean Bishop accepted a position as Dean of Engineering at Texas A&M University in 2024.

The Department of Medical Engineering was established in 2016 as a collaboration between the USF College of Engineering and the University of South Florida Morsani College of Medicine to train students in biomedical engineering, which combines biological knowledge with engineering principles.

=== 2020s ===
In the fall semester of 2022, the Department of Civil Engineering added an undergraduate degree program in Environmental Engineering.

== Notable figures ==
=== Students ===
Chemistry student Petr Taborsky claimed that discoveries he made about the mineral clinoptilolite’s ability to clear ammonia from wastewater were a result of his own work and he owned the intellectual property rights. The University of South Florida and Florida Progress Corporation, which paid for the research, disagreed. The ensuing legal battle resulted in Taborsky’s conviction for theft of notebooks containing research information. He was convicted of grand theft in state court in 1990. The United States Patent and Trademark Office approved Taborsky’s claim in 1992 and awarded a patent to him. Taborsky was eventually incarcerated in 1996 and released in 1997.

=== Faculty ===
Prasant Mohapatra is an Indian-American computer scientist. Mohapatra is currently the Provost of the University of South Florida.

Autar Kaw is a professor of mechanical engineering at the University of South Florida. In 2012, he received the U.S Professor of the Year award from the Carnegie Foundation for Advancement of Teaching and the Council for Advancement and Support of Education. His research interests include engineering education, classroom modalities, open education resources, mechanics of composite materials, and bascule bridge design.

Norma A. Alcantar is a Mexican–American chemical engineer. She is a professor in the Department of Chemical Engineering and Biomedical Engineering at the University of South Florida.

Richard D. Gitlin (born April 25, 1943) is an electrical engineer, inventor, research executive, and academic whose principal places of employment were Bell Labs and the University of South Florida (USF). He is known for his work on digital subscriber line (DSL), multi-code CDMA, and smart MIMO antenna technology all while at Bell Labs.

Nagarajan Ranganathan (30 Mar 1961 – 25 October 2018) was a Distinguished University Professor of Computer Science and Engineering at the University of South Florida, Tampa, United States

In 1993, USF Computer Science and Engineering Associate Professor and prominent Palestinian civil rights activist Sami Al-Arian came under scrutiny by the United States Department of Justice, which suspected Al-Arian was involved in terrorist activities. The matter played out in the media, courts, and USF’s administration for several years until Al-Arian was fired by USF in 2003 after he was arrested by federal agents. Later that year, the American Association of University Professors said Al-Arian's right to due process was violated in his firing. During a 2005 trial of Al-Arian and three others, prosecutors failed to prove their case against the defendants. Al-Arian accepted a plea deal in 2006 which included his deportation to Turkey.

Dharendra Yogi Goswami (born May 15, 1948) is an U.S. inventor, entrepreneur, author, and educator. The company he founded, air purifier manufacturer Molekule Group—and its affiliate, former San Francisco startup Molekule—have filed for Chapter 11 bankruptcy protection and identified the city’s homeless crisis as a major factor.

== Centers, Institutes & Labs ==
· Center for Urban Transportation Research (CUTR)

· Nanotechnology Research and Education Center (NREC)

· Institute for Applied Engineering (IAE)

· Center for Assistive, Rehabilitation & Robotics Technologies (CARRT)

· Clean Energy Research Center (CERC)

· Design for X Lab

· Center for Wireless and Microwave Information Systems (WAMI)

· Resilient, Autonomous, Networked Control Systems (RANCS) Research Group

· AI+X Institute for Artificial Intelligence
