= Garrovillas de Alconétar =

Garrovillas de Alconétar, Spain
- municipality
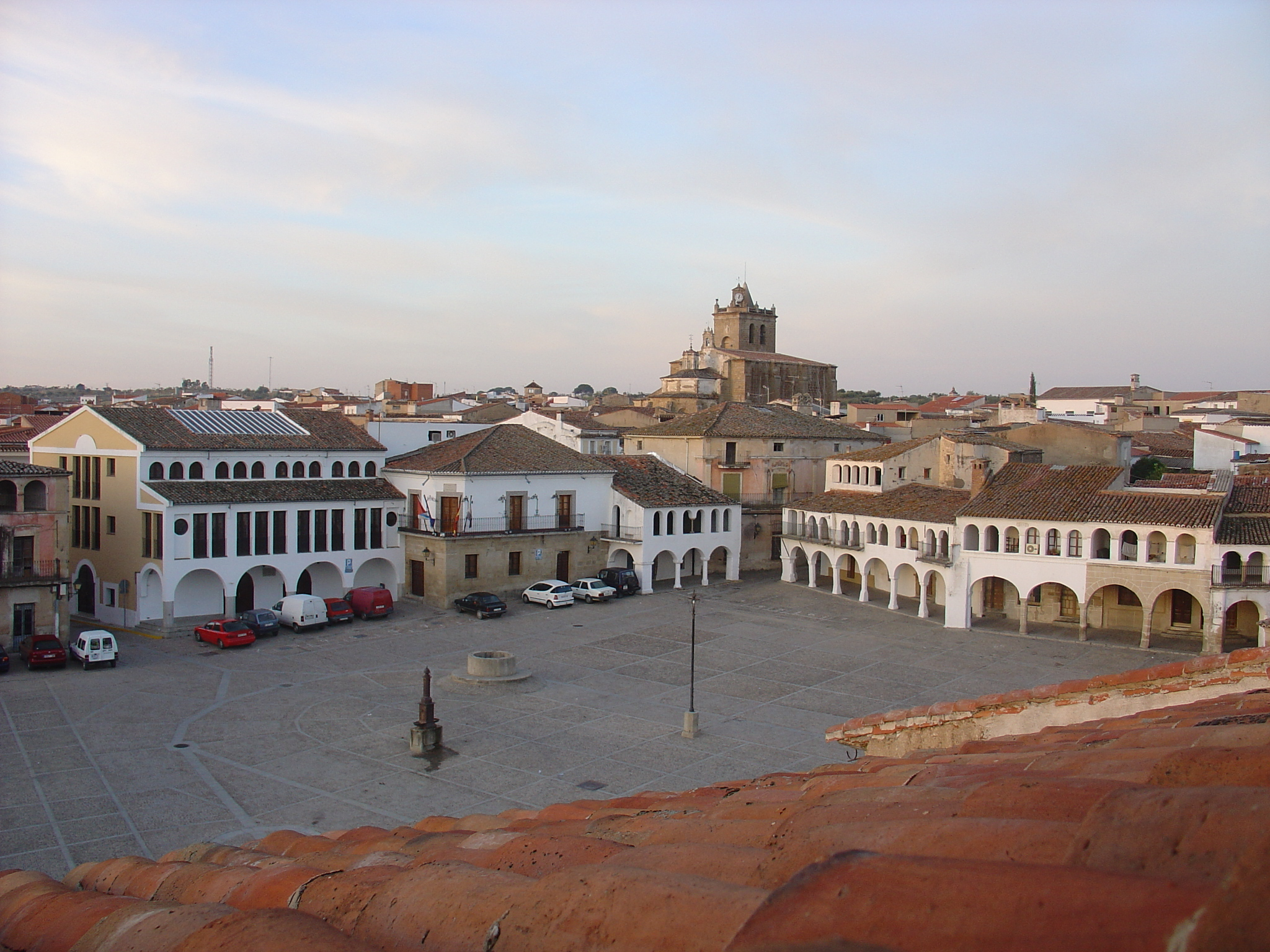

- Flag Coat of arms
- Interactive map of Garrovillas de Alconétar, Spain
- Coordinates: 39°42′N 6°33′W
- Country: Spain
- Autonomous community: Extremadura
- Province: Cáceres
- Municipality: Garrovillas de Alconétar

Area
  - Total: 207 km^{2} (80 sq mi)
- Elevation: 327 m (1,073 ft)

Population (2025-01-01)
  - Total: 1,941
  - Density: 9.38/km^{2} (24.3/sq mi)
- Time zone: UTC+1 (CET)
  - Summer (DST): UTC+2 (CEST)

Garrovillas de Alconétar is a municipality located in the province of Cáceres, Extremadura, Spain. According to the 2005 census (INE), the municipality has a population of 2372 inhabitants.

Nearby are found the remains of the Roman Alconétar Bridge.

== See also ==
- List of municipalities in Cáceres
