= Barra d'Alcântara =

Coordinates: 6.51694°S 42.1139°W

- Municipality
- Country: Brazil
- Region: Nordeste
- State: Piauí
- Mesoregion: Centro-Norte Piauiense

Population (2020)
  - Total: 3,952
- Time zone: UTC−3 (BRT)

Barra d'Alcântara is a municipality in the state of Piauí in the Northeast region of Brazil.

== See also ==
- List of municipalities in Piauí
