= Conceição de Ipanema =

Brazilian municipality situated in State of Minas Gerais, Brazil

Coordinates: 19°55′40″S 41°41′38″W

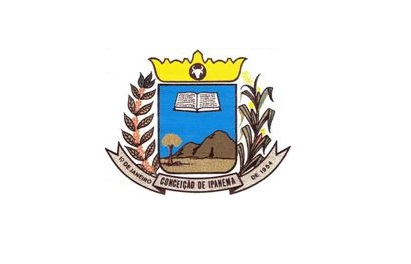
- Flag Coat of arms
- Interactive map of Conceição de Ipanema
- Country: Brazil
- State: Minas Gerais

Government
  - Mayor: Samuel Lopes de Lima

Area
  - City: 254 km^{2} (98 sq mi)
  - Urban: .65 km^{2} (0.25 sq mi)

Population (2022)
  - City: 4,409
  - Density: 17.36/km^{2} (45.0/sq mi)
- Website: Official website

Conceição de Ipanema is a Brazilian municipality situated in state of Minas Gerais. It has an area of 253.935 km^{2} and as of 2022, its population is 4,409.

The toponymy Conceição de Ipanema is composed of two expressions: Conceição (Conception) is the patroness of the city and Ipanema connects to the name of the neighboring municipality to which it belonged. The word 'Ipanema' comes from the Tupi language Y-panéma, meaning "bad water, bad for river fishing."

The José Pedro River, cuts the town in half, creating recreational areas for the population. The river received its name in honor of pioneer José Pedro de Alcantara.

== History ==
The region was first inhabited by Indians Aimorés. The first European to reach those lands was José Pedro de Alcântara, followed by Manoel Francisco de Paula Cunha, the National Guard deserter, fugitive of the War of Santa Luzia, in 1842. The town had its beginning on the farm of Francis Ignatius Fernandes Leon, in 1850. That year, the farmer had built a chapel on his property in honor of Our Lady of Conception. In 1920, a group of people led by José da Luz Laudelino acquired the land and donated the farm to the Catholic Church. From 1917, work began on the German migration to the region with the acquisition of land by the stream of descendants of German Carlos Henrique Saar, John Kaiser and Anthony Keller, with strong influence in the culture of the city.

The village of Conception in the town of Ipanema, grew to become the district on December 27, 1948, by Law No. 336, under the name of Conceição de Ipanema. The district was promoted to the council on December 12, 1953, by Law No. 1039. On January 31, 1955, the City Council was installed and Antonio Heringer became the first mayor, with José de Oliveira as vice-mayor.

== See also ==
- List of municipalities in Minas Gerais
