= Viva (airline) =

Mexican low-cost airline

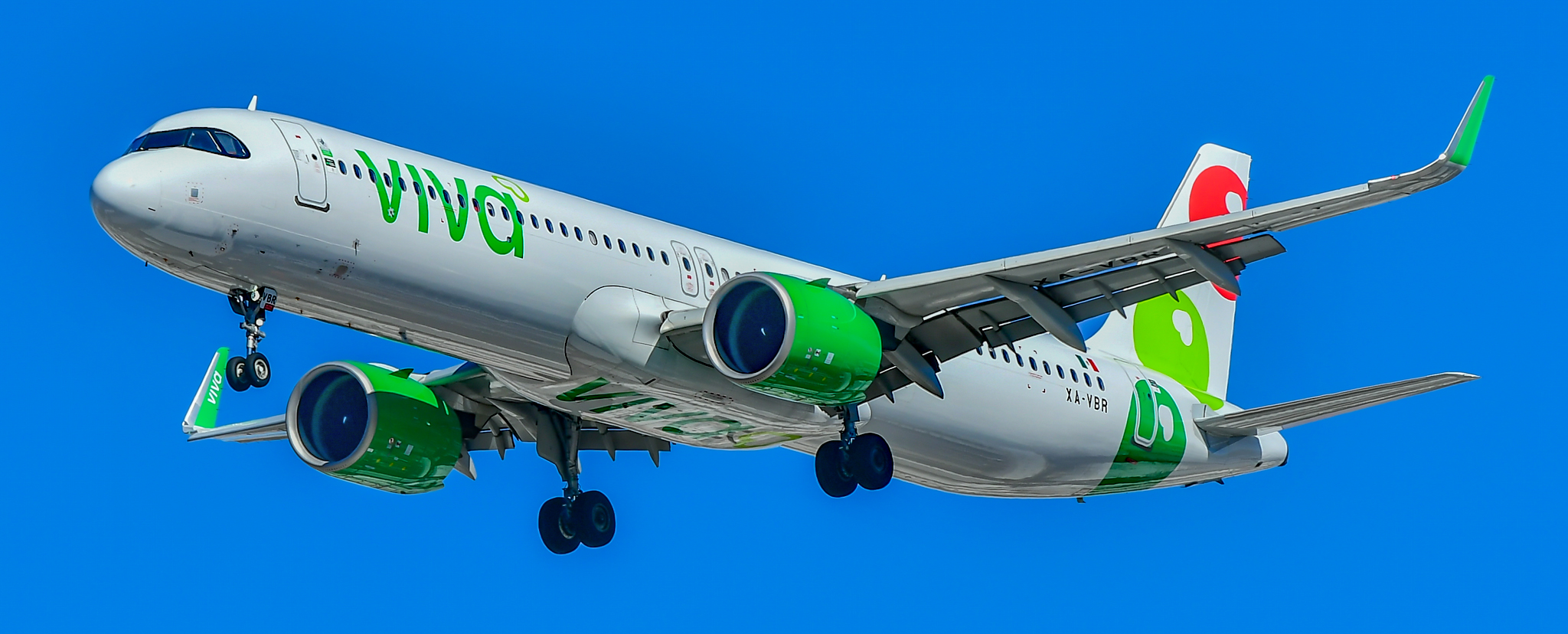
- An Airbus A321neo featuring Viva's new livery
IATA	ICAO	Call sign
VB	VIV	VIVA
- Commenced operations: 30 November 2006; 19 years ago (as Viva Aerobus); 30 October 2024; 2 years ago (as Viva)
- AOC #: V8OF230F
- Operating bases: Cancún; Guadalajara; Los Cabos; Mérida; Mexico City (Benito Juárez); Mexico City–AIFA; Monterrey; Tijuana
- Frequent-flyer program: Doters
- Fleet size: 116
- Destinations: 60
- Parent company: Grupo IAMSA
- Headquarters: Monterrey International Airport, Apodaca, Mexico
- Key people: Roberto Alcántara (Chairman); Juan Carlos Zuazua (CEO)
- Employees: 3,100
- Website: www.vivaaerobus.com

Aeroenlaces Nacionales, S.A. de C.V., trading as Viva (formerly Viva Aerobus), is a major Mexican low-cost airline headquartered at Monterrey International Airport, in Apodaca, Nuevo Leon, Mexico. Measured by passenger numbers, it is Mexico's third-largest airline and eleventh-largest airline in North America, offering more than 160 routes in more than 50 destinations serving Mexico, the United States, Central and South America.

Viva is fully owned by the largest bus company group in Mexico, IAMSA, and was co-founded by and invested in by Irelandia Aviation.

Viva operates mostly within a combination of point-to-point system with direct flights between middle-size airports and a hub system. Monterrey International Airport serves as its largest hub in terms of passengers carried and the number of departures. Cancun, Guadalajara, Mexico City-Benito Juarez, Los Cabos, Mérida, Mexico City-Felipe Angeles and Tijuana serve as operating bases.

== History ==
The airline, launched as Viva Aerobus, commenced operations on 30 November 2006, with its hub at Monterrey International Airport, in Monterrey, Mexico, and with an initial investment of $50 million and two Boeing 737-300 aircraft. Viva Aerobus was co-owned by Ryanair's Irelandia Aviation and the Mexican bus company IAMSA. Ryanair joined with Alexander Maurice Mason of Kite Investments to establish "RyanMex" to facilitate the Irish family's investment in the Mexican airline. IAMSA has showed interest in developing a new stage of transportation after its successful bus market in Mexico, and Irelandia has been actively investigating the market opportunity, leading to the companies' partnership to form a Mexican low-cost carrier. Irelandia held a 49% of shares in the airline, while IAMSA had the remaining majority stake.

The airline initially connected Monterrey to a number of Mexican domestic locations, and in July 2007, publicly confirmed its intention to open its first base outside of Mexico and first US destination in Austin, Texas (although it ultimately pulled out of Austin in 2009).

Viva Aerobus fares were intended to undercut traditional Mexican carriers by up to 50%, in a change of the industry that started with the arrival of the country's second generation of low-cost airlines (Avolar, MexicanaClick, Interjet, Volaris) and the privatization of Mexicana de Aviación, one of the two top national airlines. The airline started operations at Monterrey International Airport in November 2006 with two aircraft and one nonstop service connecting Monterrey to Tijuana, under the leadership of Mike Szucs as its CEO. A year after its foundation, in October 2007, Viva Aerobus had already transported one million passengers. Later, Donald Rogers became Viva Aerobus CEO in May 2009, the month when Guadalajara became the airline's second base. In June 2010, the airline's leadership was assigned to Juan Carlos Zuazua, current CEO. Expansion continued and the airline established Mexico City, Cancun, Tijuana and Mérida as its new bases in 2011, 2013, 2015 and 2022, respectively.

On 5 November 2007, the airline received approval from the US Department of Transportation to operate to Austin-Bergstrom International Airport, initially serving the Mexican destinations of Cancún, Monterrey, Guadalajara and León. Flights to the South Terminal Austin began on 1 May 2008.

On 16 May 2009, Viva Aerobus stated it would cease passenger operations at Austin-Bergstrom International Airport on 31 May 2009. The airline blamed the pullout in part on an outbreak of swine flu, which caused an unprecedented decrease in demand for service. The company began to fly between Monterrey and Las Vegas in the summer of 2009.

In November 2009, the airline announced it had applied to commence operations between Hermosillo and Las Vegas beginning in March 2010.

In April 2010, the airline finally began serving Mexico's capital with two flights, one from Monterrey and the other from Guadalajara. It also started serving Houston's George Bush Intercontinental Airport. However, the airline planned to serve Houston Hobby Airport on completion of that airport's new terminal in 2015.

In 2010, the airline opened a focus city at Mexico City International Airport on 1 October after Mexicana ceased operations. Viva Aerobus switched Mexico City from focus city into a hub on 1 April 2011, beginning more destinations from the airport.

On 26 July 2011, the airline received approval to fly to Chicago-Midway International Airport. On 15 August the same year, Viva Aerobus announced it would begin round-trip service between San Antonio (SAT) and Monterrey (MTY), Mexico starting that November. On 13 April 2012, the airline ceased flights to Chicago Midway. On 7 December 2019, the airline resumed flying from Monterrey to Chicago, but this time via O'Hare International Airport. In addition, the airline flew to Morelia, Guadalajara, Leon and Zacatecas from Chicago-O'Hare for the 2019-2020 winter season.

In October 2013, Viva Aerobus has signed an agreement to order 52 Airbus A320 aircraft, consisting of 40 A320neo and 12 A320ceo aircraft, for $5.1 billion, making it the largest order by a Latin American carrier.

On 15 May 2014, Viva Aerobus received and started using Airbus A320s. It continued using Boeing 737s until the end of 2016, when it began operating an all-Airbus fleet.

In October 2014, Viva Aerobus began nonstop flights from Ciudad Juárez (Chihuahua State) to Mexico City, León, and Hermosillo. In 2015, the airline launched flights to Dallas–Fort Worth from several Mexican cities. The service was terminated in October 2015.

As of 8 December 2016, IAMSA has acquired a 100% stake of the company after Irelandia Aviation sold its 49% stake to the company following regulatory approval.

On 17 December 2017, Viva Aerobus began non-stop service to Los Angeles International Airport from Guadalajara International Airport.

In 2018, Viva Aerobus began non-stop service to Las Vegas and New York City from Mexico City International Airport.

Viva Aerobus announced the launch of its cargo subsidiary, Viva Cargo, in January 2020.

In December 2021, Viva Aerobus has partnered with Allegiant Air to form an alliance and expand low-budget services between the United States and Mexico. Subject to regulatory approval, the alliance is planned to launch in 2023.

In early August 2022, Viva Aerobus announced a codeshare agreement with Iberia to better connect passengers going between Mexico and Spain.

In September 2024, Viva Aerobus and Air Canada announced an interline agreement.

In October 2024, the airline underwent a major rebranding as simply "Viva", and introduced a new "Flex-Sí-bilidad" policy for a more relaxed experience for passengers, which include improved ticket, name, and flight changes. Alongside, a new logo and livery was introduced.

In December 2025, Viva and Volaris have signed an agreement to merge and form a new airline group, effectively creating Mexico's largest domestic carrier. The deal would allow the airlines to continue operating as separate brands.

== Corporate affairs ==
=== Business trends ===
The key trends for Viva are (as of the financial year ending 31 December):

	Revenue (US$ m)	Net profit (US$ m)	Number of passengers (m)	Passenger load factor (%)	Fleet size	References
2016	271	36	6.3	84.6	21	
2017	378	28	8.1	89.9	24	
2018	512	37	10.0	90.0	31	
2019	679	25	12.0	88.7	36	
2020	414	−123	8.1	80.5	43	
2021	998	76	15.2	83.6	55	
2022	1,461	8	20.6	85.8	69	
2023	2,024	121	24.9	86.8	81	
2024	2,565	235	27.6	87.3	90	

=== Headquarters ===
The corporate headquarters is in Terminal C of Monterrey International Airport in Apodaca, Nuevo Leon. It occupies space in the terminal's cargo zone.

=== Sponsorships ===
To promote physical activity and healthy recreation, Viva has been the official sponsor of the Atlas, Tigres UANL and América Liga MX soccer teams; as well as Los Tomateros de Culiacan and Los Sultanes de Monterrey Mexican baseball teams. Internationally, it is also a sponsor of the NBA team the San Antonio Spurs and the Las Vegas Raiders of the NFL.

=== In-flight services ===
As of 2009, Viva has a buy on board program offering food and drinks for purchase.

== Destinations ==
Countries in which Viva operates as of May 2026

=== Bus services ===
Viva operates a shuttle bus from downtown El Paso, Texas to Abraham González International Airport in Ciudad Juárez, Chihuahua. Viva also operated a bus shuttle between Austin-Bergstrom International Airport South Terminal and the Omnibus Mexicanos Bus Terminal in eastern Houston in addition to a bus shuttle between the Austin airport and the Omnibus Mexicanos Bus Terminal in downtown San Antonio for passengers on flights going to and from Cancún and Monterrey.

=== Codeshare and interline agreements ===
Viva has codeshare and interline agreements with the following airlines:

Codeshare

- Aerus
- British Airways
- Iberia

Interline

- Air Canada
- Avianca
- Emirates

== Fleet ==
=== Current fleet ===
As of July 2025, Viva operates an all-Airbus A320 family fleet composed of the following aircraft:

Aircraft	In service	Orders	Passengers	Notes
Airbus A320-200	44	—	180	
Airbus A320neo	30	—	186	
Airbus A321-200	10	—	220	
Airbus A321neo	32	14	240	
Total	116	14		

=== Fleet development ===
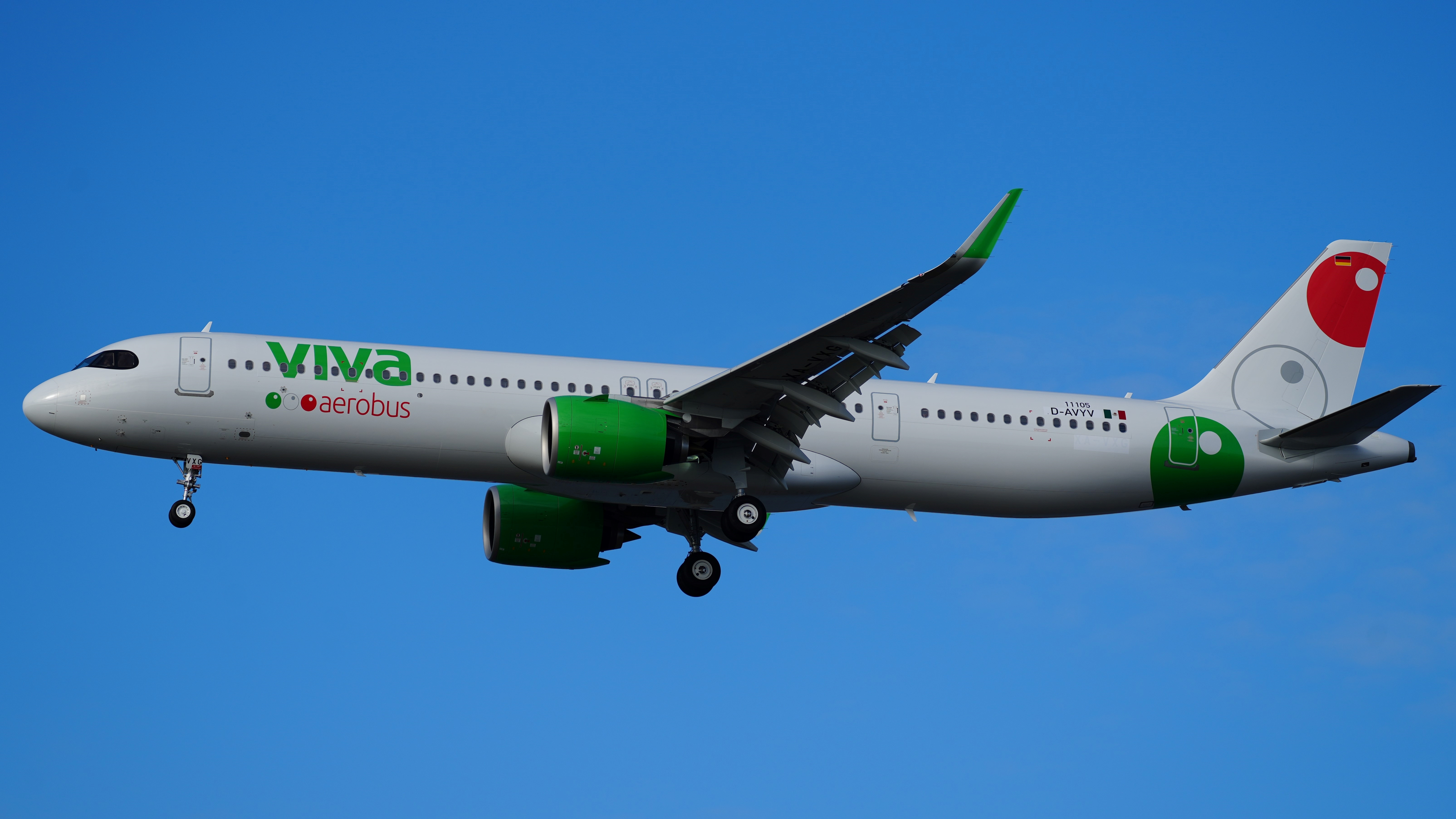
Viva Airbus A321neo in its former livery version

In its beginnings, Viva Aerobus operated with a fleet integrated by Boeing 737-300 aircraft. In October 2016, the airline took ownership of the first PW1100-JM-powered Airbus A320neo. This was part of an order placed with Airbus in October 2013 for 52 Airbus A320 family aircraft, including 12 A320ceos, at the time the largest number of aircraft ordered by a Mexican airline directly from Airbus. The first A320ceo had been delivered in May 2015. At the time of receiving the first A320ceo, the carrier operated a fleet of six leased A320s and Boeing 737-300 aircraft.

Viva Aerobus amended an existing order with Airbus in July 2018 to include the Airbus A321neo, of which 41 were included in the new orderbook. The carrier took delivery of the first of these aircraft in June 2020. In July 2023, the airline signed a memorandum of understanding with Airbus for an additional 90 240-seater Airbus A321neo aircraft.

== Accidents ==
- 18 March 2021: Flight 4343, operated by an Airbus A320-232, was a scheduled flight from Puerto Vallarta-Gustavo D. Ordaz Airport to Monterrey-General Mariano Escobedo International Airport. While turning 180 degrees to line up for takeoff from runway 22, the nose landing gear collapsed. All 133 people on board were evacuated via the emergency slides safely. However, the crash resulted in the aircraft being written off.

== See also ==
- List of active Mexican airlines
- Lists of airlines
