= Mata de Alcántara =

Mata de Alcántara, Spain
- municipality
- Flag Coat of arms
- Interactive map of Mata de Alcántara, Spain
- Coordinates: 39°42′N 6°42′W
- Country: Spain
- Autonomous community: Extremadura
- Province: Cáceres
- Municipality: Mata de Alcántara

Area
  - Total: 34 km^{2} (13 sq mi)
- Elevation: 332 m (1,089 ft)

Population (2025-01-01)
  - Total: 300
  - Density: 8.8/km^{2} (23/sq mi)
- Time zone: UTC+1 (CET)
  - Summer (DST): UTC+2 (CEST)
- Website: http://www.matadealcantara.com

Mata de Alcántara (Extremaduran: La Mata) is a municipality located in the province of Cáceres, Extremadura, Spain. According to the 2005 census (INE), the municipality has a population of 320 inhabitants.

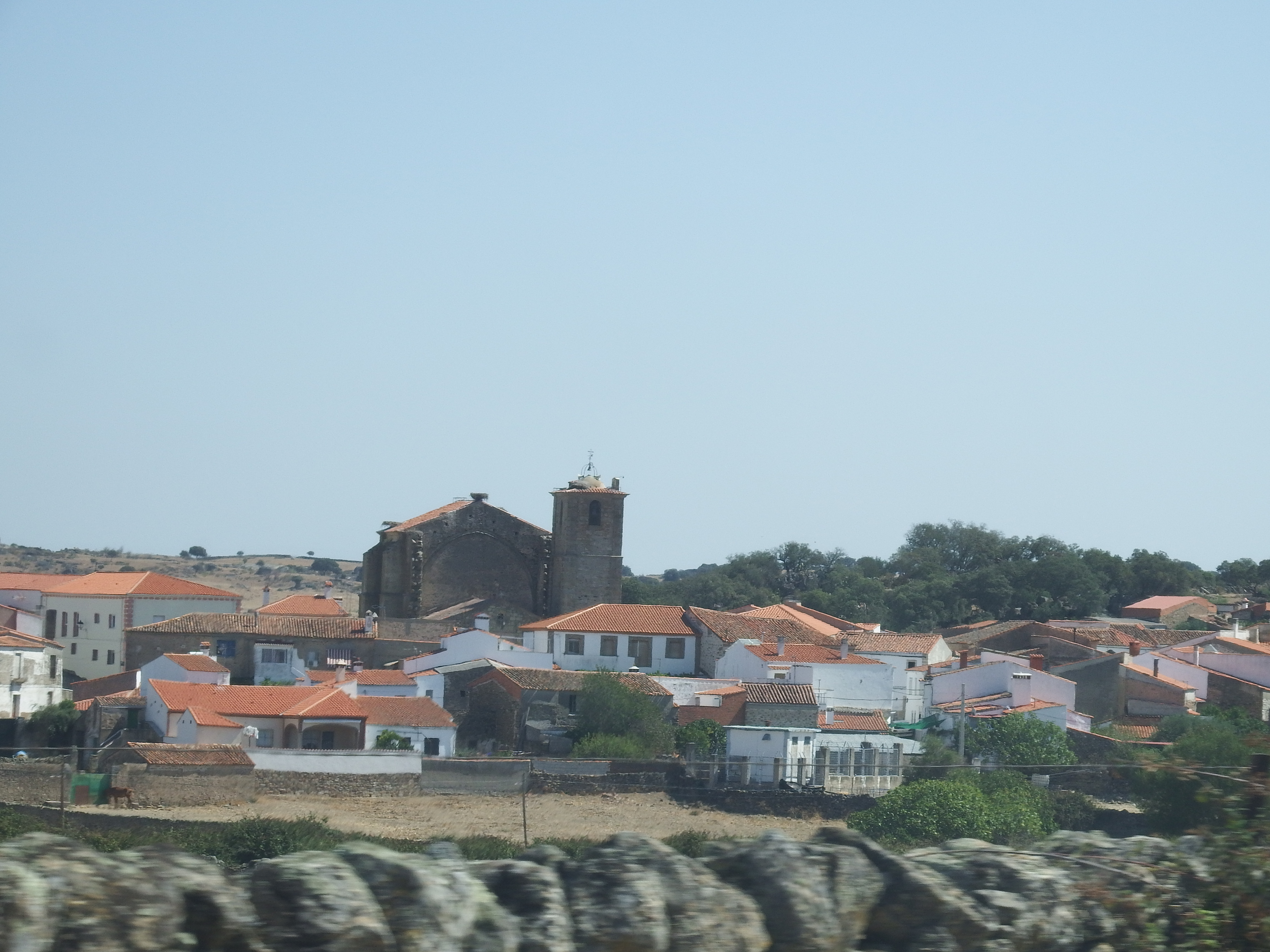
View of Mata de Alcántara

== See also ==
- List of municipalities in Cáceres
