= Roberto Alcántara =

Mexican entrepreneur and businessman (born 1950)

Roberto Alcántara Rojas
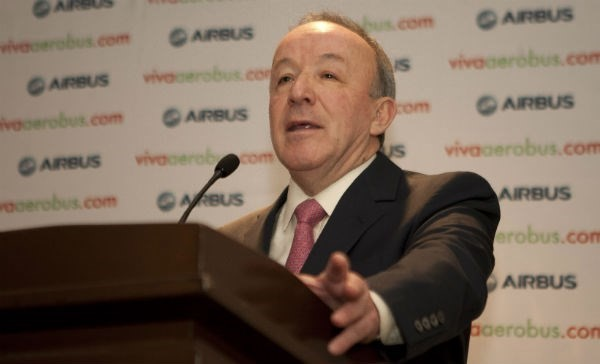
- Born: Roberto Alcántara Rojas; April 19, 1950 (age 75); Acambay, Mexico
- Occupation: Businessman
- Parent: Jesús Alcántara Miranda

Roberto Alcántara Rojas (born April 19, 1950 in Acambay, Mexico) is a Mexican entrepreneur and businessman, mainly dedicated to passenger transportation through land and air services. He is the chairman of the board of directors of Grupo IAMSA, one of the main passenger transportation consortiums in Mexico. He also has a 9.3% stake in the media conglomerate Grupo Prisa.

== Biography ==
Roberto Alcántara is the son of the politician and businessman Jesus Alcántara Miranda, who was mayor of Acambay, located in the State of Mexico and twice a federal congressman and senator. His grandfather, Manuel Alcántara, also served as senator and mayor in 1927 and, according to the chronicler Edgar Serrano, he brought electric light to the village.

Roberto Alcántara was an entrepreneur even during his childhood. With only 10 years old, he sold corn, lemonade and candies in the town market; in addition he used to sell women's stockings house by house.

Alcántara studied high school at the Franco Spanish School in Mexico City. Subsequently, his father commissioned him the business of a nixtamal mill. He was successful and soon opened several tortillerias and even established a corn transport company. Nonetheless, at the age of 29, he joined the bus company founded by his father: Grupo Toluca.

In 1990, Grupo Toluca partnered with Grupo Flecha Amarilla, a transportation company started by the Herrera family and renowned Mexican entrepreneurs. Thanks to this union between the two main interstate bus operators in Mexico, the largest transport consortium in the country was created: Grupo IAMSA. Alcántara initially acted as an advisor in the company and together with his team he began diversifying the business by entering into the luxury land transportation sector with the ETN bus line.

In August 1991, when the privatization of the Mexican bank system was announced, the Alcántara family bought Bancrecer, a financial institution. Bancrecer merged with BANORO, Somoza and Cortina Casa de Bolsa in order to integrate the Bancrecer Financial Group. Roberto Alcántara was named president of the board of directors of this institution, a position he held during nine years.

The bank did not survive the financial crisis of 1994–1995 and the stock control was acquired by the Instituto para la Protección al Ahorro Bancario (IPAB), formerly known as the Fondo Bancario de Protección al Ahorro (Fobaproa). After reaching an agreement with the authorities, Bancrecer was finally given to the Mexican government in 1999.

Transportation sector leader

Due to his experience in the sector, Roberto Alcántara presided the Cámara Nacional de Autotransporte de Pasaje y Turismo during 1992–1994 and 2002–2004. Moreover, and after his father's death, Alcántara would hold the presidency of Grupo IAMSA in 2005. Under his leadership, the consortium grew by adding dozens of small businesses and thus became the largest firm in the sector with more than 900 members.

Currently, Grupo IAMSA is Mexico's only multimodal transport conglomerate (buses, railroad and airplanes), integrated in the terrestrial sector by four entities: Flecha Amarilla, Grupo Toluca, IAMSA and Omnibus de México. It has over 80 years of experience, operates in 24 states of the Mexican Republic and serves the major cities in the State of Texas and other cities on the East Coast of the United States. According to experts, it covers about 24% of the Mexican bus travelling market. Moreover, it has more than 10 thousand units, representing about 25% of the total buses of the federal passenger transportation industry. Grupo IAMSA generates more than 24 thousand jobs and offers its services to more than 300 million passengers per year. Among its most recognized brands are ETN, Omnibus, TAP, Amealcenses and Flecha Amarilla.

In 2006, Grupo IAMSA, in partnership with Grupo Irelandia (owner group of the airline Ryanair), founded the low-cost Mexican airline Viva Aerobus.

Viva Aerobus began operating in November 2006 with two routes between Monterrey and Tijuana. Nowadays, Viva Aerobus offers more than 60 routes and in 2013 the airline announced the renewal of its fleet by purchasing 52 Airbus A320 aircraft, becoming the airline with the youngest fleet in Mexico. In addition, within the framework of the airline's tenth anniversary, Grupo IAMSA acquired a 100% stake in Viva Aerobus; it is now a fully Mexican company.

Following the success of Viva Aerobus, Grupo IAMSA and Irelandia launched the airline Viva Colombia in 2012. However, in December 2016, an agreement among the shareholders was established; it Irelandia to buy IAMSA's stake in the airline.

Roberto Alcántara´s businesses have diversified into several sectors. Since 2008, his company Omnitren, together with the Spanish company Construcciones y Auxiliar de Ferrocarriles (CAF), began operating Mexico City´s suburban train. In 2014, his company Telepeaje Dinámico won the public auction to operate the electronic toll system (IAVE). Although politicians like Andrés Manuel López Obrador and some PAN and PRD congressmen pointed out the existence of irregularities in this process, no official allegation was presented.

Also in that year, Alcántara was appointed as an independent advisor of the media conglomerate Grupo PRISA and member of its Delegate Committee. Grupo PRISA currently operates in 22 countries and owns the newspaper El País, the publishers Santillana and Alfaguara, and in Mexico holds several radio stations together with Televisa and Radiorama like W Radio, Los 40 Principales and Ke Buena.

A couple of months later, Alcántara invested 100 million euros in PRISA through the consortium Transporter. After that, he increased his shareholding to 9.3%, becoming the main individual shareholder of the group.

== Companies ==
- chairman of the board of directors of Grupo de Inversionistas en Autotransportes Mexicanos (IAMSA)
  - Bus division
    - Enlaces Terrestres Nacionales (ETN)
    - Transportes y Autobuses del Pacífico (TAP)
    - Destinos Parhikuni
    - Transportes Amealcenses
    - Costa Line
    - Ómnibus de México
  - Air division
    - Viva
  - Railway division
    - Omnitren: Operates the suburban passenger train
- Grupo Toluca (50% of Grupo IAMSA)
  - Autovías
  - La Línea
  - Pegasso
  - Sur de Jalisco
  - HP
  - Viajero
  - Autobuses del Occidente
  - Zinacantepec
  - Nuevo Horizonte
  - TUSA
  - Halcones
  - Zina-bus: Excelencia and Excelencia Plus
  - Grupo Flecha Roja: Flecha Roja and Águila
  - Caminante
  - Viajero
  - Allegra
  - Vía Ovnibus
  - AM
- Grupo Flecha Amarilla (50% of Grupo IAMSA)
  - Primera Plus
  - Servicios Coordinados
  - Flecha Amarilla
  - Jorullo
  - La Alteña
  - Ómnibus del Bajío
  - Regionales de Querétaro
- Main individual shareholder of Grupo PRISA through the company Consorcio Transportista Occher
  - Editorial-Educación: Santillana, textbooks
  - Press: El País, As and Cinco Días
  - Radio: broadcasters in 12 countries
  - Audiovisual: Media Capital (Portuguese television) and V-Me (Spanish-language channel in the United States).

== Awards and recognitions ==
- In 2016, Alcántara received the Medal of Merit "Don Agustín Serna Servín".
- Repeatedly named as one of the 100 most important entrepreneurs in Mexico by CNN-Expansión.
