= Battle of Alcantara =

Battle of Alcantara may refer to:

- Battle of Alcântara (1580), during the Portuguese dynastic crisis of the 16th century
- Battle of Alcántara (1706), between British and French forces during the War of the Spanish Succession
- Battle of Alcántara (1809), during the Peninsular War
