= Alcántara Dam =

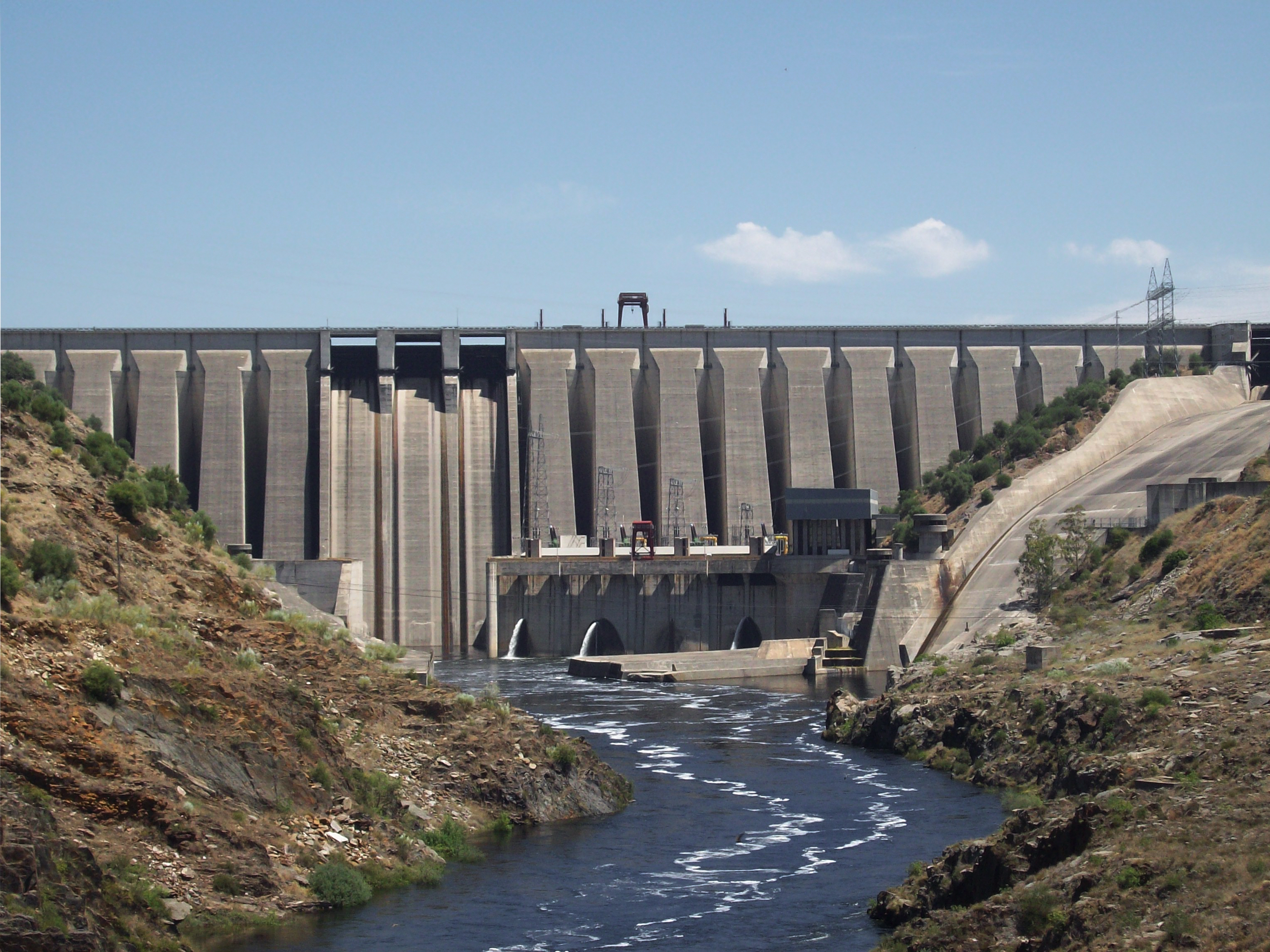

- Location within Spain
- Location: Alcántara, province of Cáceres, Extremadura, Spain
- Coordinates: 39°43′48″N 6°53′05″W
- Status: Operational
- Opening date: 1969

Dam and spillways
- Type of dam: Buttress
- Height: 130 m (427 ft)
- Length: 570 m (1,870 ft)
- Dam volume: 956,000 m^{3} (1,250,401 cu yd)
- Spillways: 2
- Spillway capacity: 8,000 m^{3}/s (282,517 cu ft/s)

Reservoir
- Total capacity: 3,160,000,000 m^{3} (2,561,854 acre⋅ft)
- Catchment area: 51,916 km^{2} (20,045 sq mi)

Power Station
- Commission date: 1969-1970
- Turbines: 4 x 229 MW Francis-type
- Installed capacity: 915 MW

The Alcántara Dam, also known as the José María de Oriol Dam, is a buttress dam on the Tagus River near Alcántara in the province of Cáceres, Spain. It is named after the politician and captain of the Spanish electricity industry José María de Oriol y Urquijo. The dam regulates much of the flow of the Tagus River, the longest of the Iberian Peninsula. It was built in 1969 and is the second largest reservoir in Western Europe. In 2024, a pumped-storage project was approved to use the Alcántara reservoir as the upper reservoir, and Cedillo as the lower, with around 100 m height difference serving two reversible turbines at a combined 440 MW.

The Roman Alcántara Bridge is located 600 m downstream from the dam.
