= Norma A. Alcantar =

Mexican American chemical engineer

- Born: Mexico City, Mexico

Academic background
- Education: BSc, chemical engineering, 1993; PhD, chemical engineering, 2000, University of California, Santa Barbara

Academic work
- Institutions: University of South Florida

Norma A. Alcantar is a Mexican–American chemical engineer. She is a professor in the Department of Chemical Engineering and Biomedical Engineering at the University of South Florida. In 2019, Alcantar was elected a fellow of the American Institute for Medical and Biological Engineering for "outstanding contributions in providing drinking water for low-income communities and contributions to disrupting amyloid fibril formation in Alzheimer's research".

== Early life and education ==
Alcantar was born and raised in Mexico City, Mexico. She became interested in chemical engineering during her childhood in Mexico. While growing up, she helped her grandmother bring river water to the family farm. If the water was contaminated, her grandmother taught her to boil it with part of a cactus plant. After completing her Bachelor of Science degree in chemical engineering in 1993, Alcantar was awarded an abroad fellowship to earn her master's degree and PhD at the University of California, Santa Barbara (UCSB).

== Career ==
Following her PhD, Alcantar accepted a postdoctoral research position in the Department of Chemical Engineering and Materials Science at the University of California, Davis, and UCSB from 2000 to 2001. She then worked in the Materials Research Laboratory at UCSB in Surface Characterization and Interfacial Phenomena of Thin Films and worked as a consultant engineer in SurForce Corp. Alcantar eventually joined the faculty at the University of South Florida (USF) in August 2003. When she originally joined the department, USF did not have her research laboratory ready so she began focusing on Alzheimer's disease and drugs to treat cancer tumors instead of water purification.

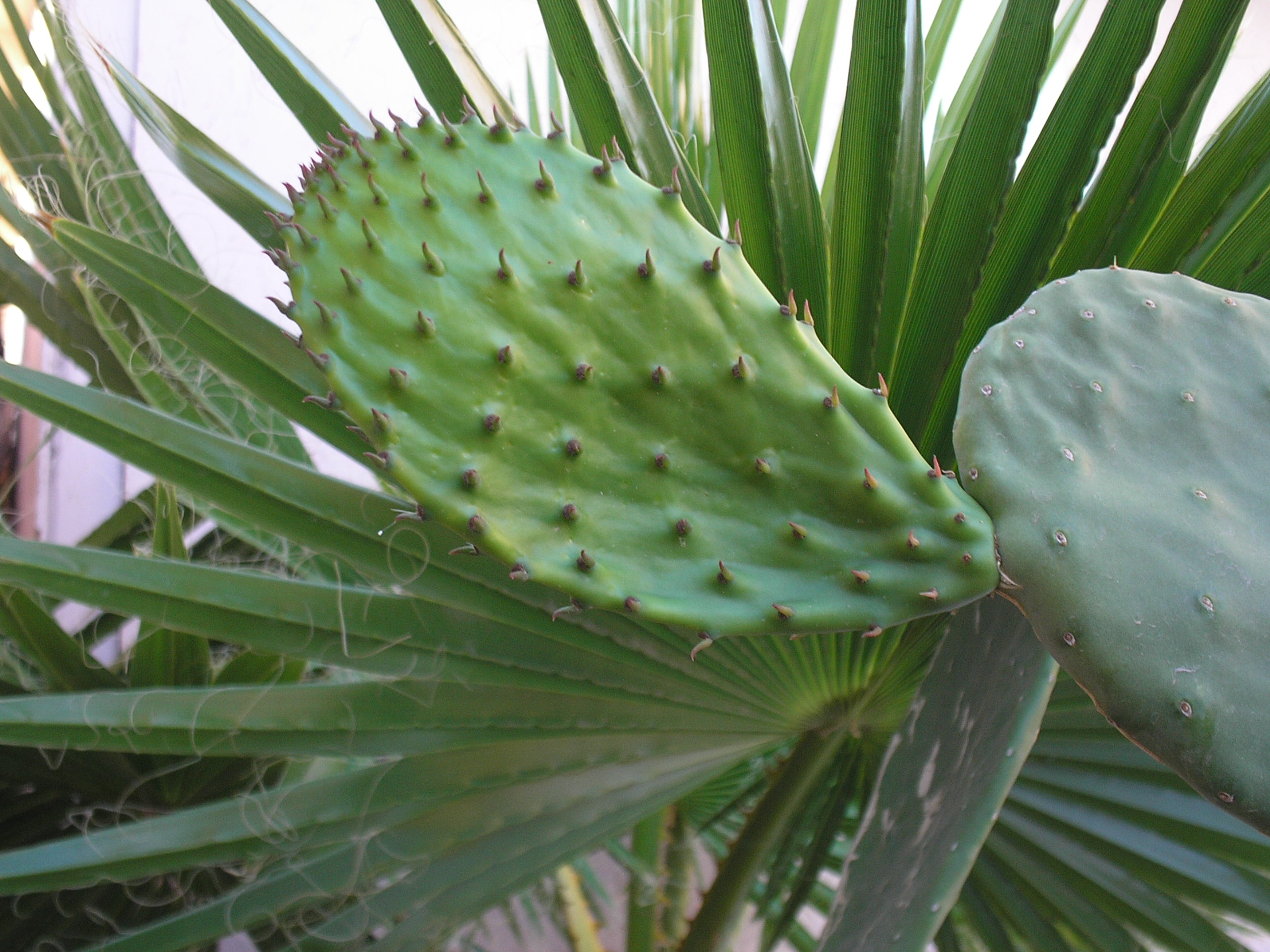
A photo of a mature edible nopal pad.

As a professor at USF, Alcantar focused on the development of a method using natural materials extracted from a cactus plant as a non-toxic, renewable procedure to purify water. She discovered that the mucilage of nopal, a viscous liquid contained in the leaves, was responsible for purifying water. She then used this process to assist people during the 2010 Haiti earthquake. Following the earthquake, Alcantar's work in Haiti focused on using the cactus to purify water in areas with heavy metals and bacteria went into the groundwater. Following the 2010 Deepwater Horizon oil spill, Alcantar began to explore if mucilage could purify water that was tainted with oil and found that it was a successful chemical dispersant. Based on this discovery, she then tested if a combination of heavy hydrocarbons could stop the formation of brain plaques that cause Alzheimer's disease.

In 2016, Alcantar accepted a Fulbright Scholarship and was the recipient of an Excellence in Innovation Award for exceptional achievement in innovation and research. At the time of the award, she was also recruited by the Mote Marine Laboratory to investigate whether cactus extract could clean recirculating aquarium water. Upon finishing her Fulbright U.S. Scholar Program, Alcantar accepted a Jewish National Fund's Faculty Fellowship where she received a "comprehensive 'positively Israel' experience firsthand" with the goal of creating academic partnerships across the two countries.

As a result of her academic achievements, Alcantar was elected a fellow of the American Institute for Medical and Biological Engineering for "outstanding contributions in providing drinking water for low-income communities and contributions to disrupting amyloid fibril formation in Alzheimer's research." In 2021, she was also elected a fellow of the American Association for the Advancement of Science and was inducted into the Florida Inventors Hall of Fame.
