= Alcántara Bridge =

Bridge in Extremadura, Spain

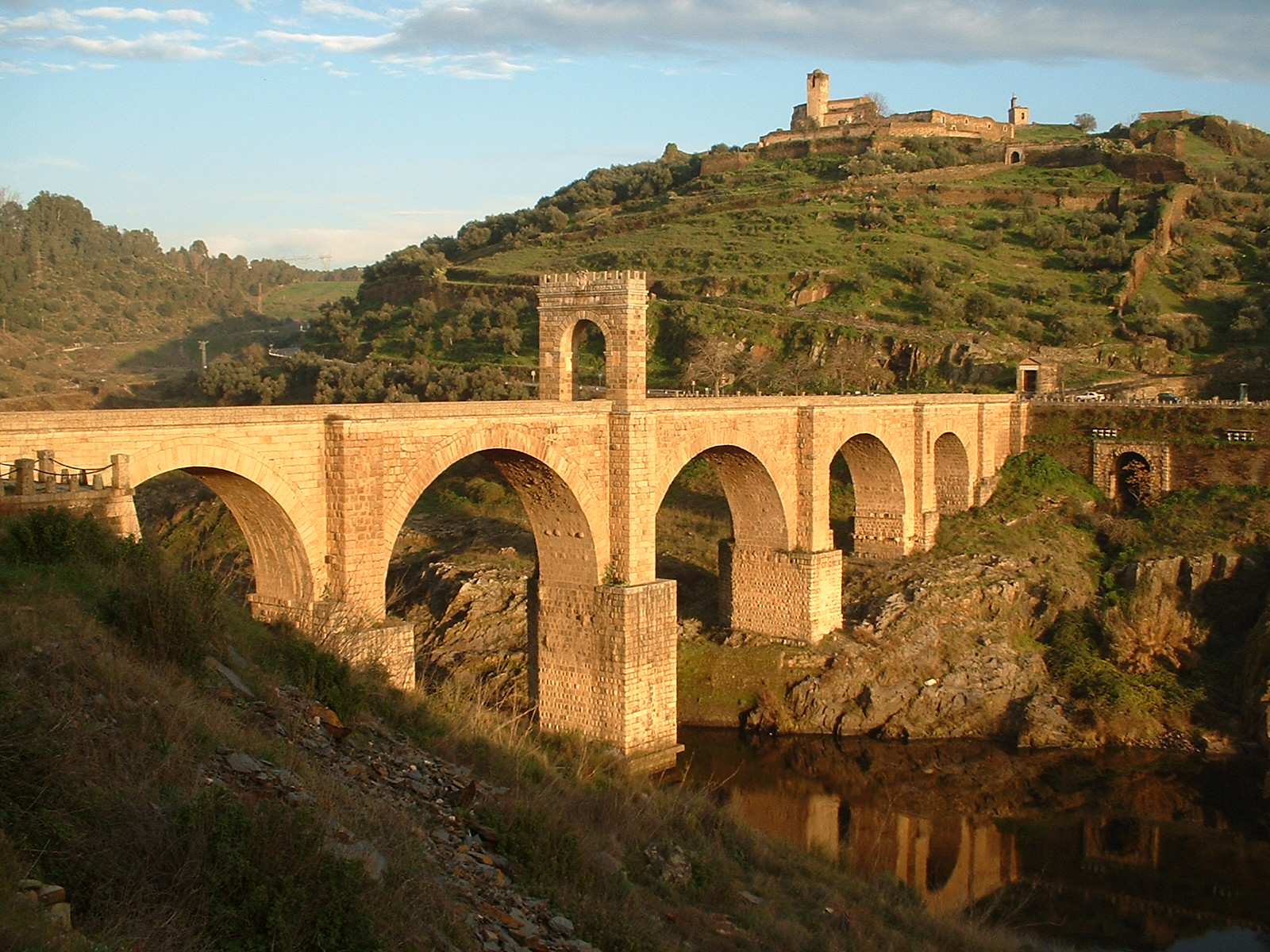
- Coordinates: 39.7224°N 6.8924°W
- Crosses: Tagus River
- Locale: Alcántara, Spain
- Heritage status: Listed as cultural heritage since 1921

Characteristics
- Design: Roman arch bridge
- Material: Stone
- Total length: 181.7 m (596 ft)
- Width: 8.6 m (28 ft)
- Height: 45 m (148 ft)
- Longest span: 28.8 m (94 ft)
- No. of spans: 6
- Load limit: 52 t (57 short tons)

History
- Designer: Caius Julius Lacer
- Construction start: 104 AD
- Construction end: 106 AD

Location
- Interactive map of Alcántara Bridge

The Alcántara Bridge (also known as Trajan's Bridge at Alcantara) is a Roman bridge at Alcántara, in Extremadura, Spain. Alcántara is from the Arabic word al-Qanṭarah (القنطرة) meaning "the arch". The stone arch bridge was built over the Tagus River between 104 and 106 AD by an order of the Roman emperor Trajan in 98.

== History ==
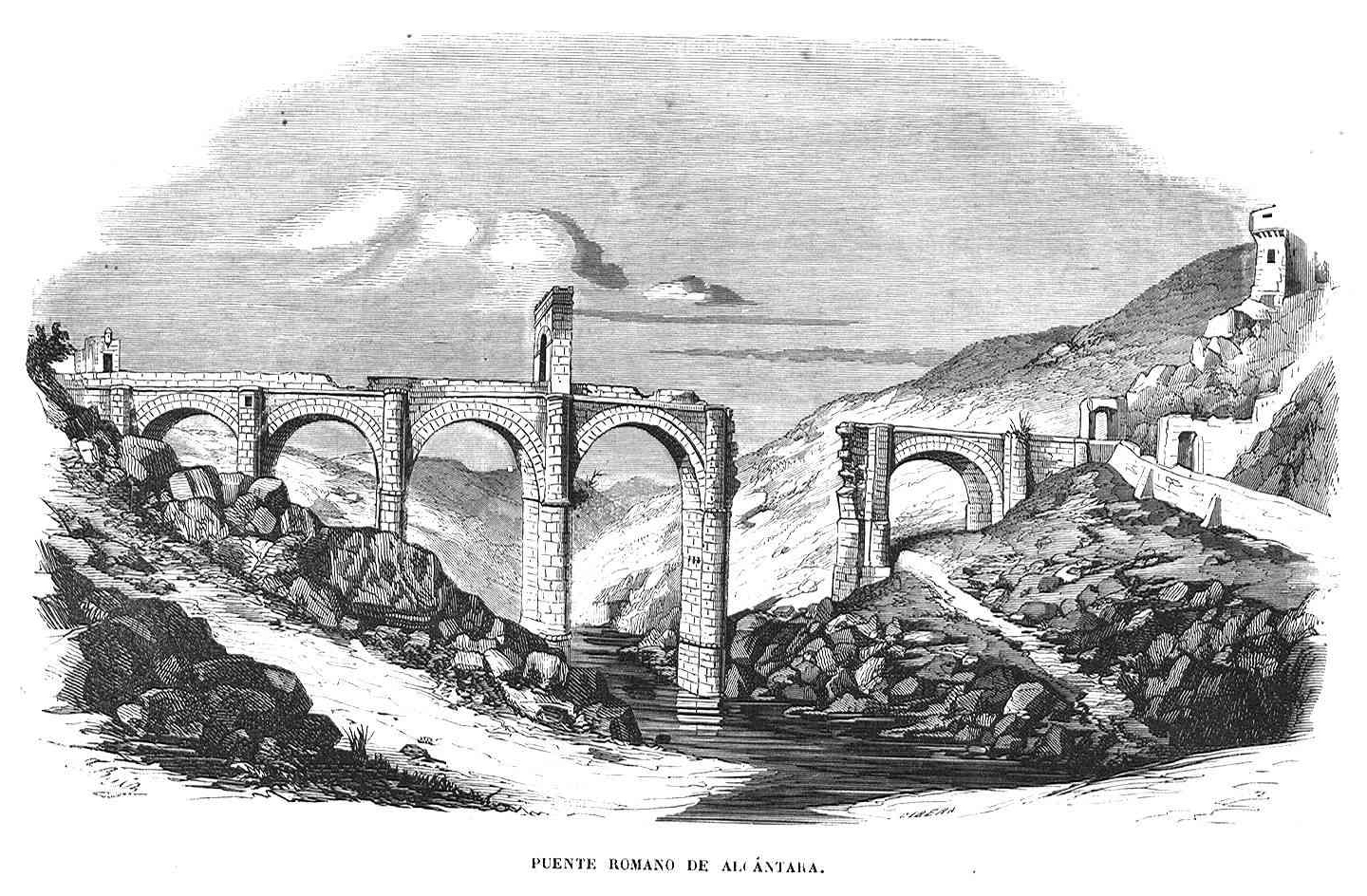
Illustration in a Spanish magazine, 1857 (shows the then current state with gap)

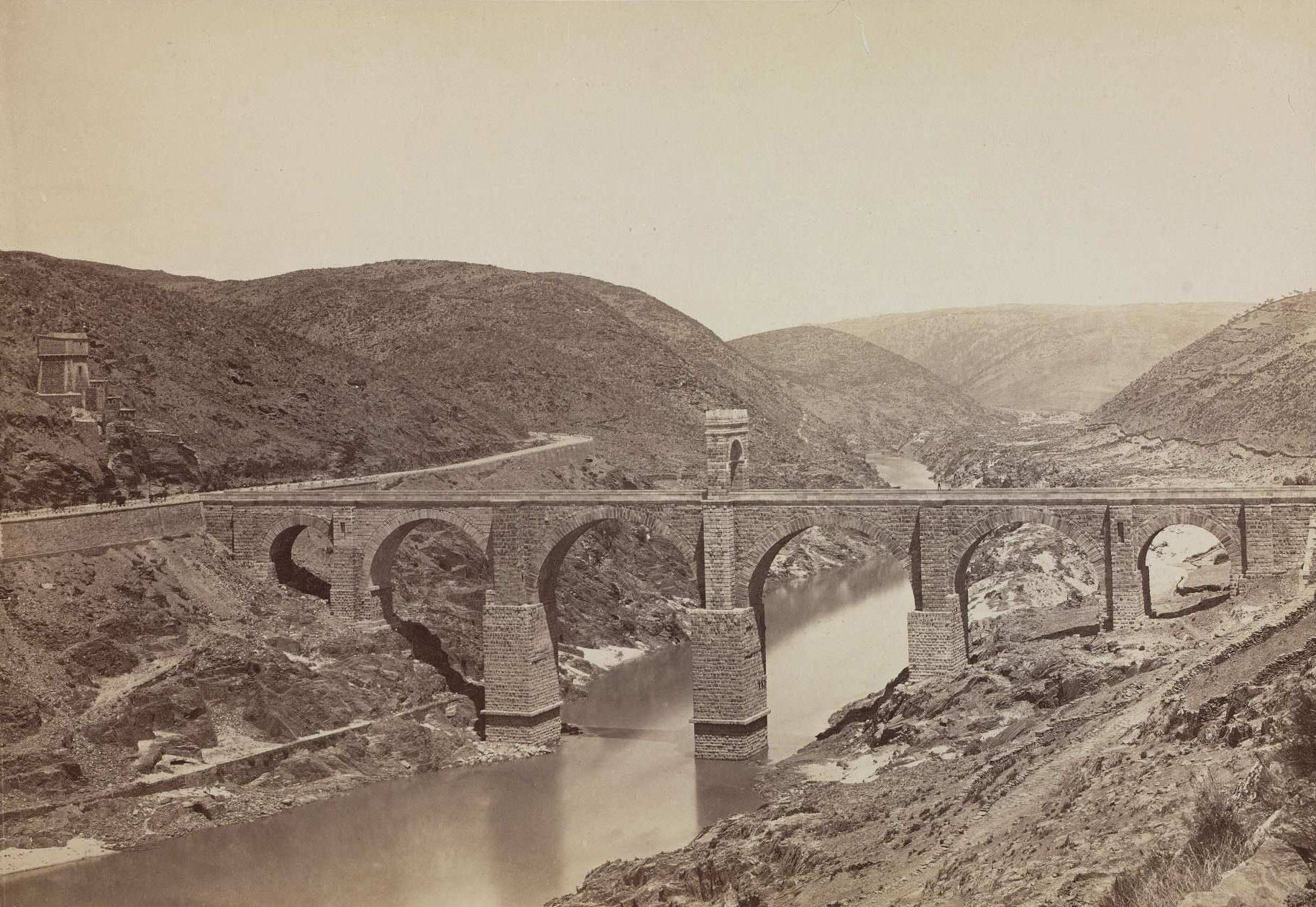
Photo of the Alcantara bridge (c. 1870), by Jean Laurent, seen from the south

The Alcántara Bridge has suffered more damage from war than from the elements over the years. The Moors destroyed one of the smallest arches in 1214 although this was rebuilt centuries later, in 1543, with stone taken from the original quarries. The second arch on the northwest side was then later destroyed in 1760 by the Spanish to stop the Portuguese advancing and was repaired in 1762 by Charles III, only to be blown up again in 1809 by Wellington's forces attempting to stop the French. Temporary repairs were made in 1819, but much of the bridge was destroyed yet again in 1836 by the Carlists. The bridge was rebuilt in 1860 using mortared masonry. And following completion of the José María de Oriol Dam, which allowed for the draining of the Tagus riverbed, the main pillars were completely repaired in 1969.

The bridge originally measured 190 m (620 ft) in length, which today is reduced to 181.7 m (596 ft). The clear spans of the six arches from the right to the left riverside are 13.6 m (45 ft), 23.4 m (77 ft), 28.8 m (94 ft), 27.4 m (90 ft), 21.9 m (72 ft) and 13.8 m (45 ft).

== Construction ==
The bridge's construction occurred in the ancient Roman province of Lusitania. In ancient Rome, the costs of building and repairing bridges, known as opus pontis ("bridge work"), were the responsibility of multiple local municipalities. Their shared costs prove Roman bridges belonged to the region overall, and not to any one town (or two, if on a border). The Alcántara Bridge was built at the expense of 12 local municipalities in Lusitania. The names were added on an inscription on the archway over the central pier.

Roman inscription on the archway
Original	Latin in full	Translation
Municipia provinciae Lusitaniae stip conlata quae opus pontis perfecerunt. Imp. Caesari divi Nervae f. Nervae. Traiano Aug. Germ. Dacico Ponti f. Max. Trib. potes VIII. imp. V. cos V. PP.	Municipia provinciae Lusitaniae stip conlata quae opus pontis perfecerunt. Imperatori Caesari divi Nervae filio, Nervae Traiano Augusto Germanico Dacico, Pontifici Maximo, Tribunicia Potestate VIII, Imperatori V, consuli V, Patri Patriae	The municipalities of the province of Lusitania contributed to the construction of the bridge. [Dedicated to] the Emperor Trajan, son of the deified Nerva, Conqueror of the Germans, Conqueror of the Dacians, the Chief High Priest, given Tribunician Power eight times, acclaimed Imperator five times, five times consul, Father of the Fatherland.

Roman inscription on the temple
Original

Pontem perpetui mansurum
in saecula mundi
fecit divina nobilis arte Lacer ...

Translation

The illustrious Lacer, with divine skill, made this bridge, which shall remain through the unending ages of the world [lit., through the ages of the unending world]

== Gallery ==
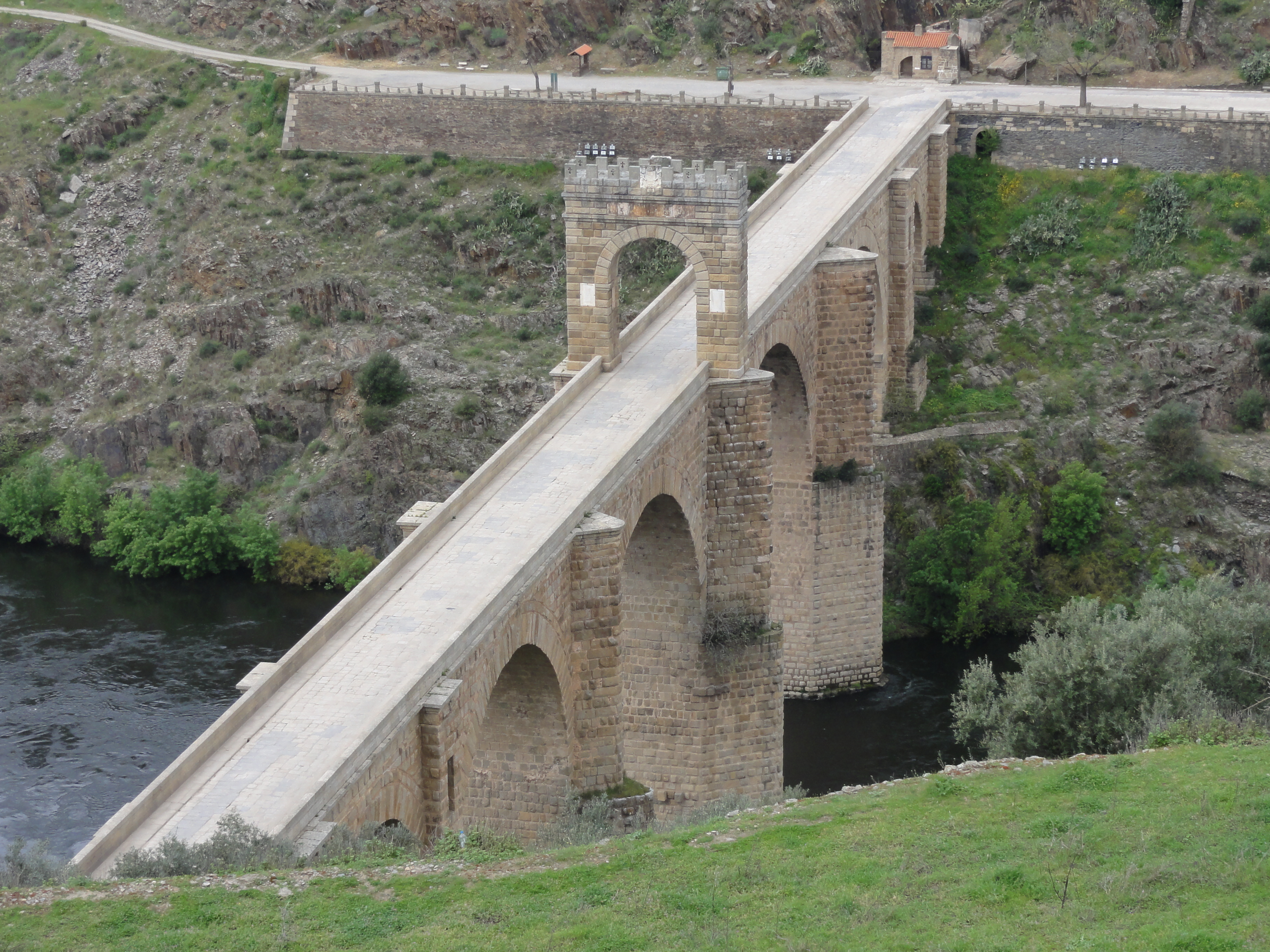

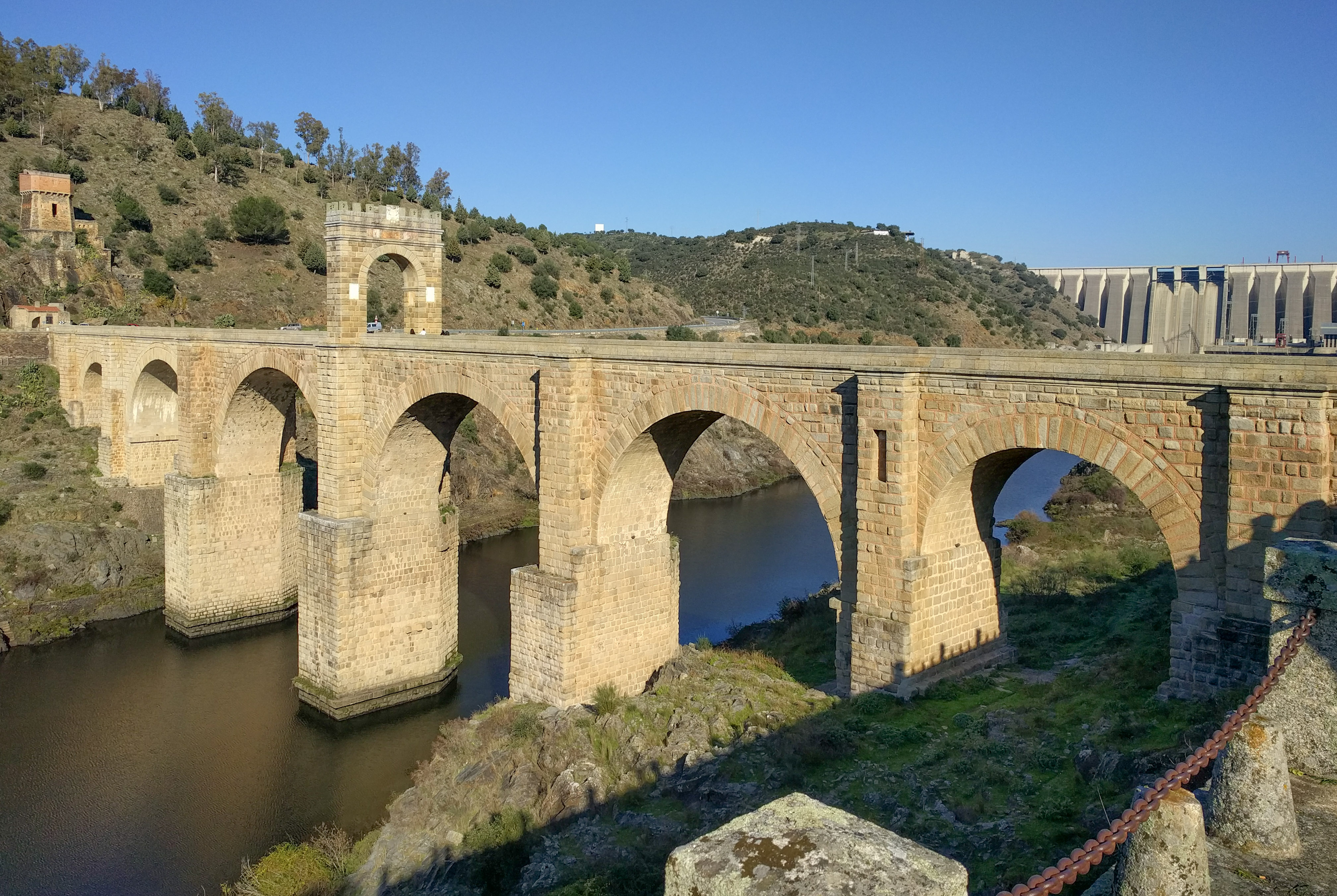

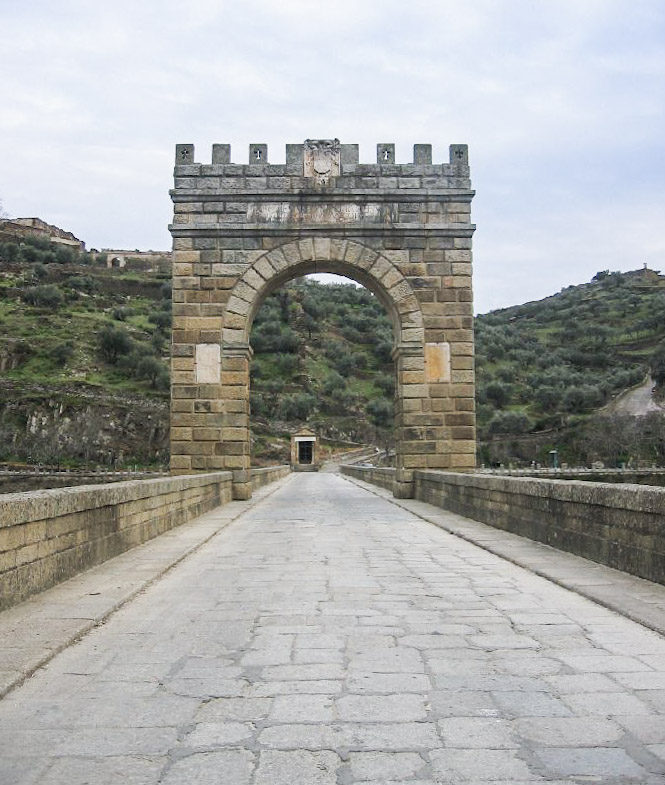
Looking south, in the background the small temple with Lacer's grave

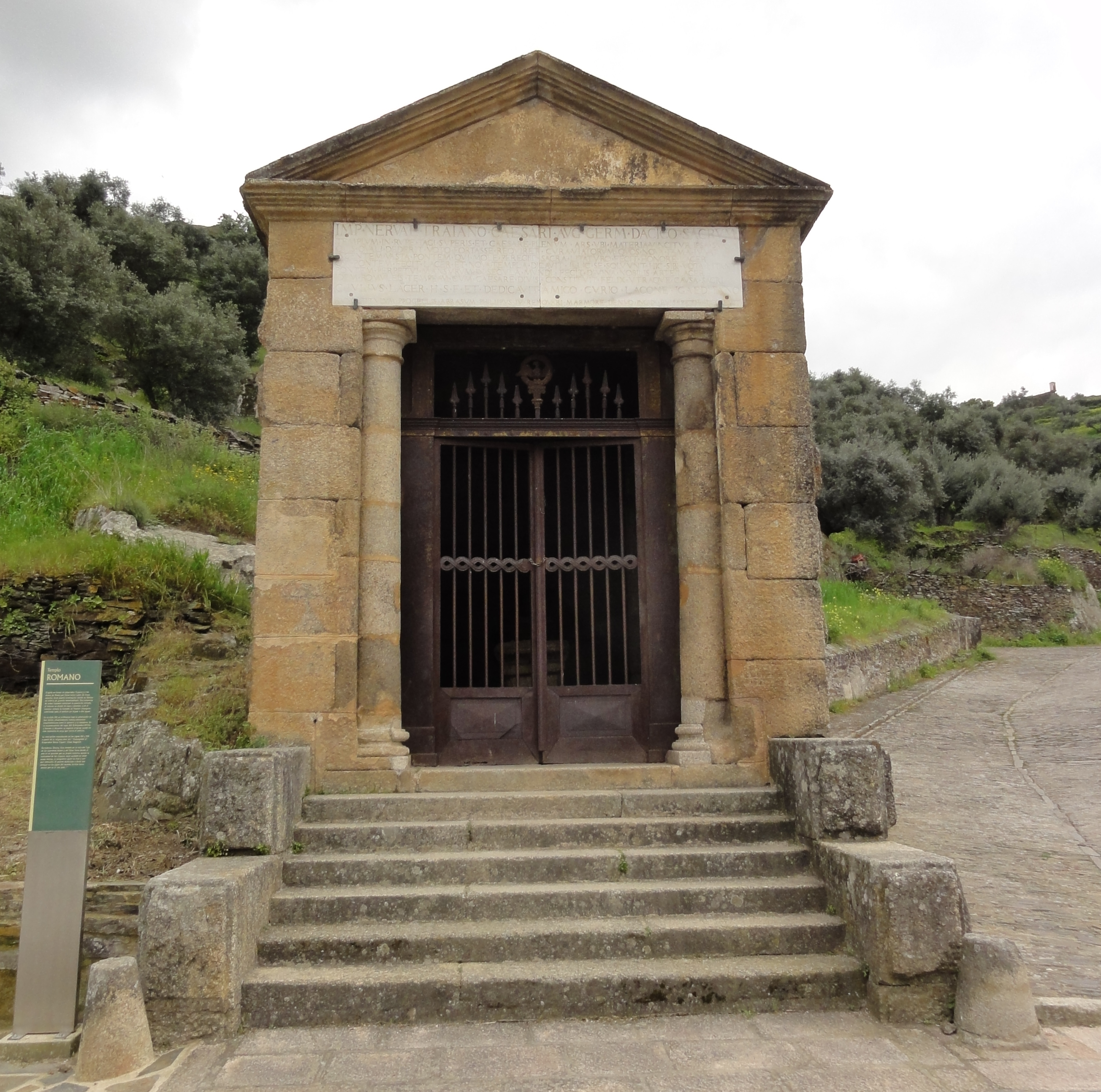
The entrance of the temple with the crypt of the Roman engineer

== See also ==
- List of Roman bridges
- Roman temple of Alcántara
- Alcántara Dam
