= List of ancient Greek and Roman architectural records =

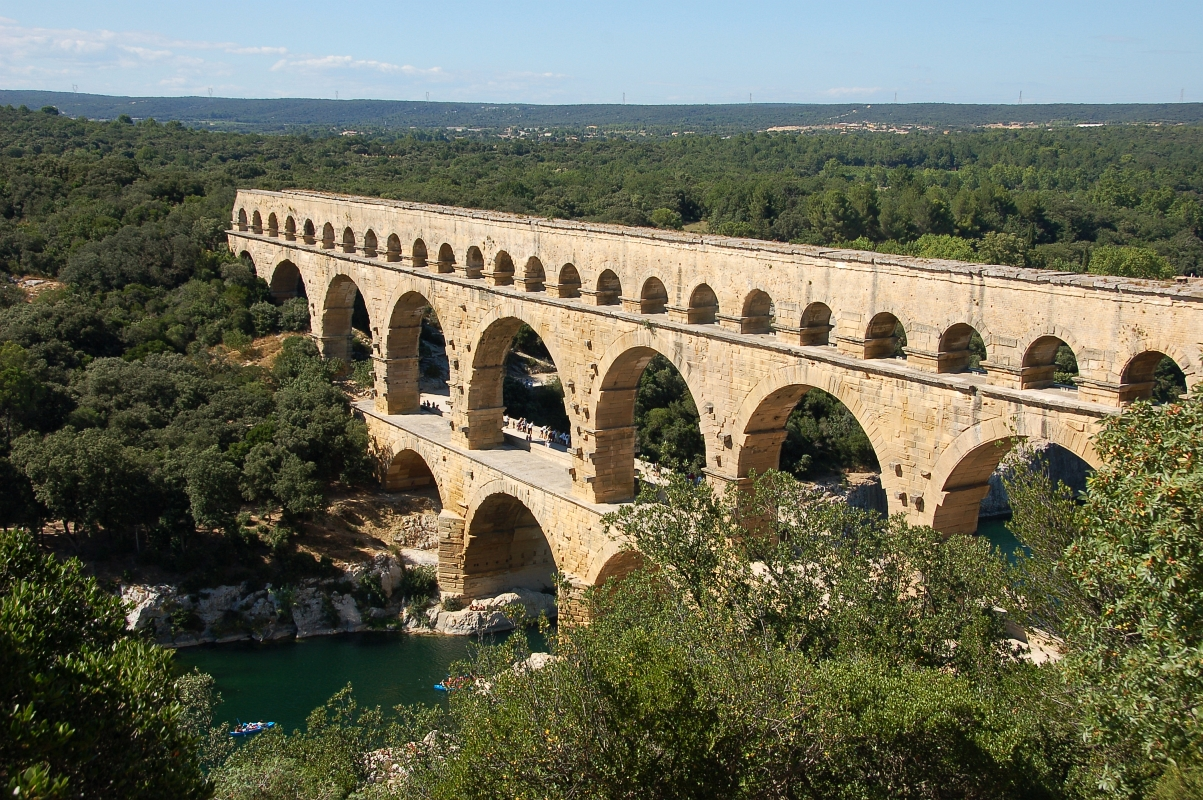
Pont du Gard in France, the tallest Roman aqueduct bridge (47.4 m)

This is the list of ancient architectural records consists of record-making architectural achievements of the Greco-Roman world from c. 800 BC to 600 AD.

== Bridges ==
- The highest bridge over the water or ground was the single-arched Pont d'Aël which carried irrigation water for Aosta across a deep Alpine gorge. The height of its deck over the torrent below measures 66 m.

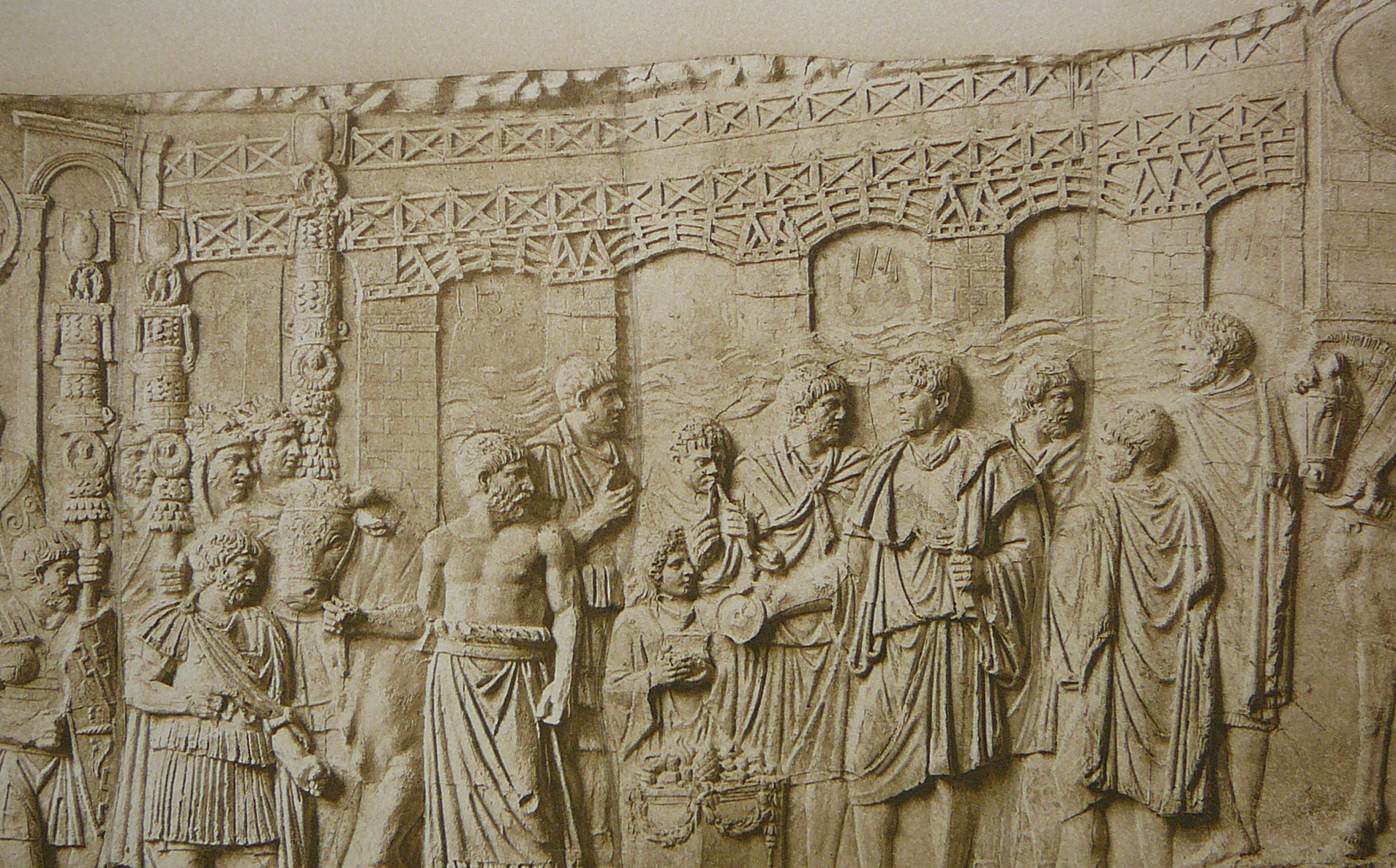
Relief of the monumental Trajan's Bridge across the Danube, record-holder in various categories, such as the largest bridge by span and the longest segmental arch bridge.

- The largest bridge by span was the Trajan's Bridge over the lower Danube. Its twenty-one timber arches spanned 50 m each from centreline to centreline.
- The largest pointed arch bridge by span was the Karamagara Bridge in Cappadocia with a clear span of 17 m. Constructed in the 5th or 6th century AD across a tributary of the Euphrates, the now submerged structure is one of the earliest known examples of pointed architecture in late antiquity, and may even be the oldest surviving pointed arch bridge.
- The largest rivers to be spanned by solid bridges were the Danube and the Rhine, the two largest European rivers west of the Eurasian Steppe. The lower Danube was crossed at least at two different crossing points (at Drobeta-Turnu Severin and at Corabia) and the middle and lower Rhine at four (at Mainz, at Neuwied, at Koblenz and at Cologne). For rivers with strong currents and to allow swift army movements, pontoon bridges were also routinely employed. Going from the distinct lack of records of solid bridges spanning larger rivers elsewhere, the Roman feat appears to be unsurpassed anywhere in the world until well into the 19th century.
- The longest bridge, and one of the longest of all time, was Constantine's Bridge with an overall length of 2,437 m, 1137 m of which crossed the Danube's riverbed. Pont Serme in southern France reached a length of 1,500 m, but may be better classified as an arcaded viaduct. The second longest bridge was thus the acclaimed Trajan's Bridge further upstream from Constantine's. Erected 104–105 AD by the engineer Apollodorus of Damascus for facilitating the advance of Roman troops in the Dacian Wars, it featured twenty-one spans covering a total distance of between 1,070 and 1,100 m. The longest existing Roman bridge is the sixty-two span Puente Romano at Mérida, Spain (today 790 m). The total length of all aqueduct arch bridges of the Aqua Marcia to Rome, constructed from 144 to 140 BC, amounts to 10 km.

Dimensions of a typical segmented arch of the Roman Bridge at Limyra, Turkey

- The longest segmental arch bridge was the c. 1,100 m long Trajan's Bridge, whose wooden superstructure was supported by twenty concrete piers. The Bridge at Limyra in modern-day Turkey, consisting of twenty-six flat brick arches, features the greatest lengths of all extant masonry structures in this category (360 m).
- The tallest bridge was the Pont du Gard, which carried water across the Gard river to Nîmes, southern France. The 270 m long aqueduct bridge was constructed in three tiers which measure successively 20.5 m, 19.5 m and 7.4 m, adding up to a total height of 47.4 m above the water-level. When crossing deeper valleys, Roman hydraulic engineers preferred inverted siphons over bridges for reasons of relative economics; this is evident in the Gier aqueduct where seven out of nine siphons exceed the 45 m mark, reaching depths up to 123 m. The tallest road bridges were the monumental Alcántara Bridge, Spain, and the bridge at Narni, Italy, which rose above the stream-level c. 42 m and 30 m, respectively.
- The widest bridge was the Pergamon Bridge in Pergamon, Turkey. The structure served as a substruction for a large court in front of the Serapis Temple, allowing the waters of the Selinus river to pass unrestricted underneath. Measuring 193 m in width, the dimensions of the extant bridge are such that it is frequently mistaken for a tunnel, although the whole structure was actually erected above ground. A similar design was also executed in the Nysa Bridge which straddled the local stream on a length of 100 m, supporting a forecourt of the city theatre. By comparison, the width of a normal, free standing Roman bridge did not exceed 10 m.

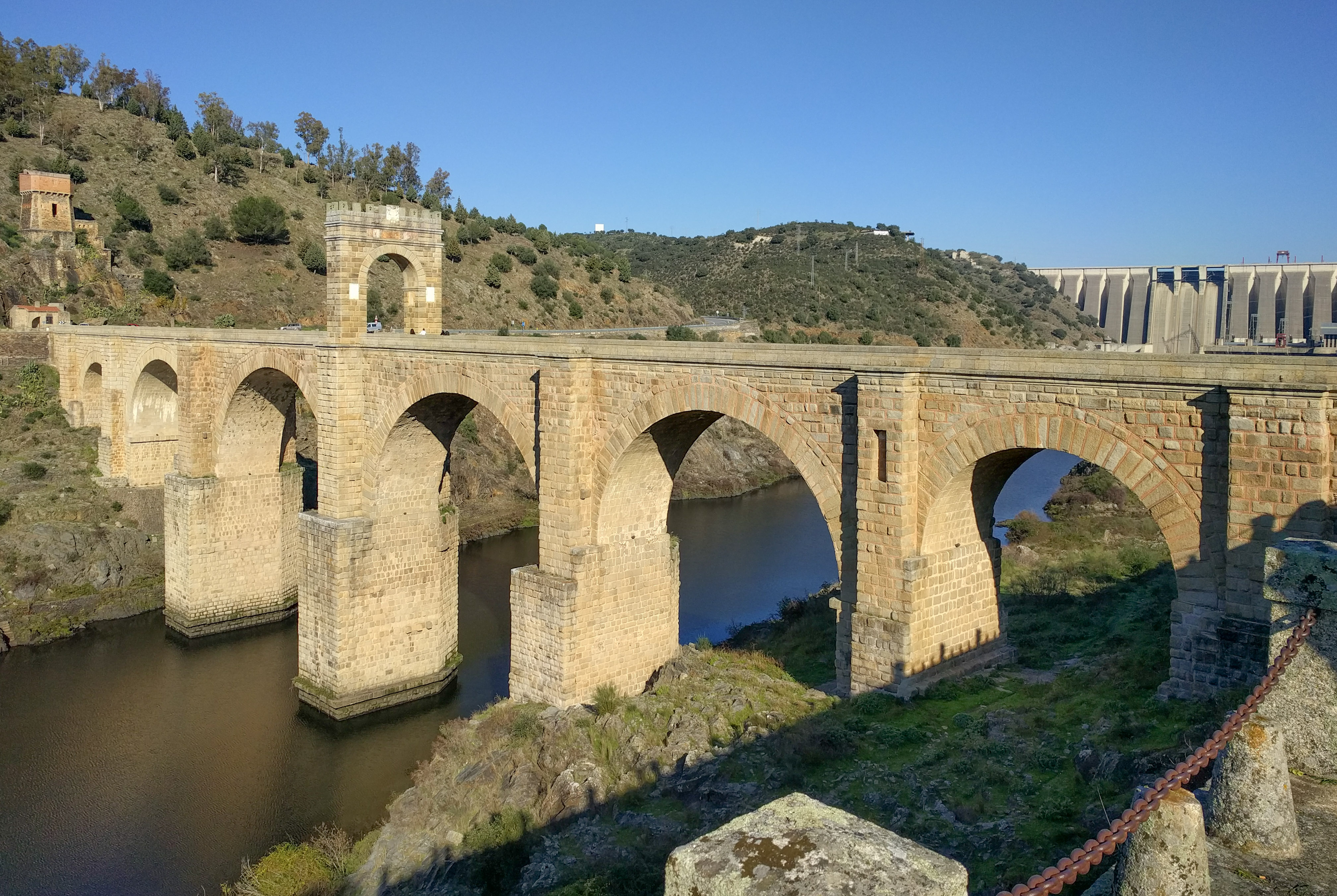
The semi-circular arches of the Alcántara Bridge can support loads of up to 52 t.

- The bridge with the greatest load capacity – as far as can be determined from the limited research – was the Alcántara Bridge the largest arch of which can support a load of 52 t, followed by the Ponte de Pedra (30 t), Puente Bibei (24 t) and Puente de Ponte do Lima (24 t) (all in Hispania). According to modern calculations, the Limyra Bridge, Asia Minor, can support a 30 t vehicle on one arch plus a load of 500 kp/m^{2} on the remaining surface of the arch. The load limit of Roman arch bridges was thus far in excess of the live loads imposed by ancient traffic.

Ratio of clear span against rise, arch rib and pier thickness:

- The bridge with the flattest arches was the Trajan's Bridge, with a span-to-rise ratio of about 7 to 1. It also held several other important architectural records (see below). A number of fully stone segmental arch bridges, scattered throughout the empire, featured ratios of between 6.4 and 3, such as the relatively unknown Bridge at Limyra, the Ponte San Lorenzo and the Alconétar Bridge. By comparison, the Florentine Ponte Vecchio, one of the earliest segmental arch bridges in the Middle Ages, features a ratio of 5.3 to 1.
- The bridge with the most slender arch was the Pont-Saint-Martin in the Alpine Aosta Valley. A favourable ratio of arch rib thickness to span is regarded as the single most important parameter in the design of stone arches. The arch rib of the Pont-Saint-Martin is only 1.03 m thick what translates to a ratio of 1/34 respectively 1/30 depending on whether one assumes 35.64 m or 31.4 m to be the value for its clear span. A statistical analysis of extant Roman bridges shows that ancient bridge builders preferred a ratio for rib thickness to span of 1/10 for smaller bridges, while they reduced this to as low as 1/20 for larger spans in order to relieve the arch from its own weight.
- The bridge with the most slender piers was the three-span Ponte San Lorenzo in Padua, Italy. A favourable ratio between pier thickness and span is considered a particularly important parameter in bridge building, since wide openings reduce stream velocities which tend to undermine the foundations and cause collapse. The approximately 1.70 m thick piers of the Ponte San Lorenzo are as slender as one-eighth of the span. In some Roman bridges, the ratio still reached one-fifth, but a common pier thickness was around one third of the span. Having been completed sometime between 47 and 30 BC, the San Lorenzo Bridge also represents one of the earliest segmental arch bridges in the world with a span to rise ratio of 3.7 to 1.

== Canals ==
- The largest canal appears to be the Canal of the Pharaohs connecting the Mediterranean Sea and the Red Sea via the Nile. Opened by king Ptolemy II around 280 BC the waterway branched off the Pelusiac arm of the river running eastwards through the Wadi Tumalat to the Great Bitter Lake on a length of 55.6 km. There, it turned sharply south following the modern course of the canal and discharged into the Red Sea after altogether 92.6 km. The canal was 10 m deep and 35 m wide, with its sea entrance secured by a lock. Under Trajan the Ptolemaic canal was restored and extended for about another 60 km to the south where it now tapped the main branch of the Nile at Babylon. A particularly ambitious canal scheme which never came to fruition was Nero's Corinth Canal project, work on which was abandoned after his murder.

== Columns ==
Note: This section makes no distinction between columns composed of drums and monolithic shafts; for records concerning solely the latter, see monoliths.

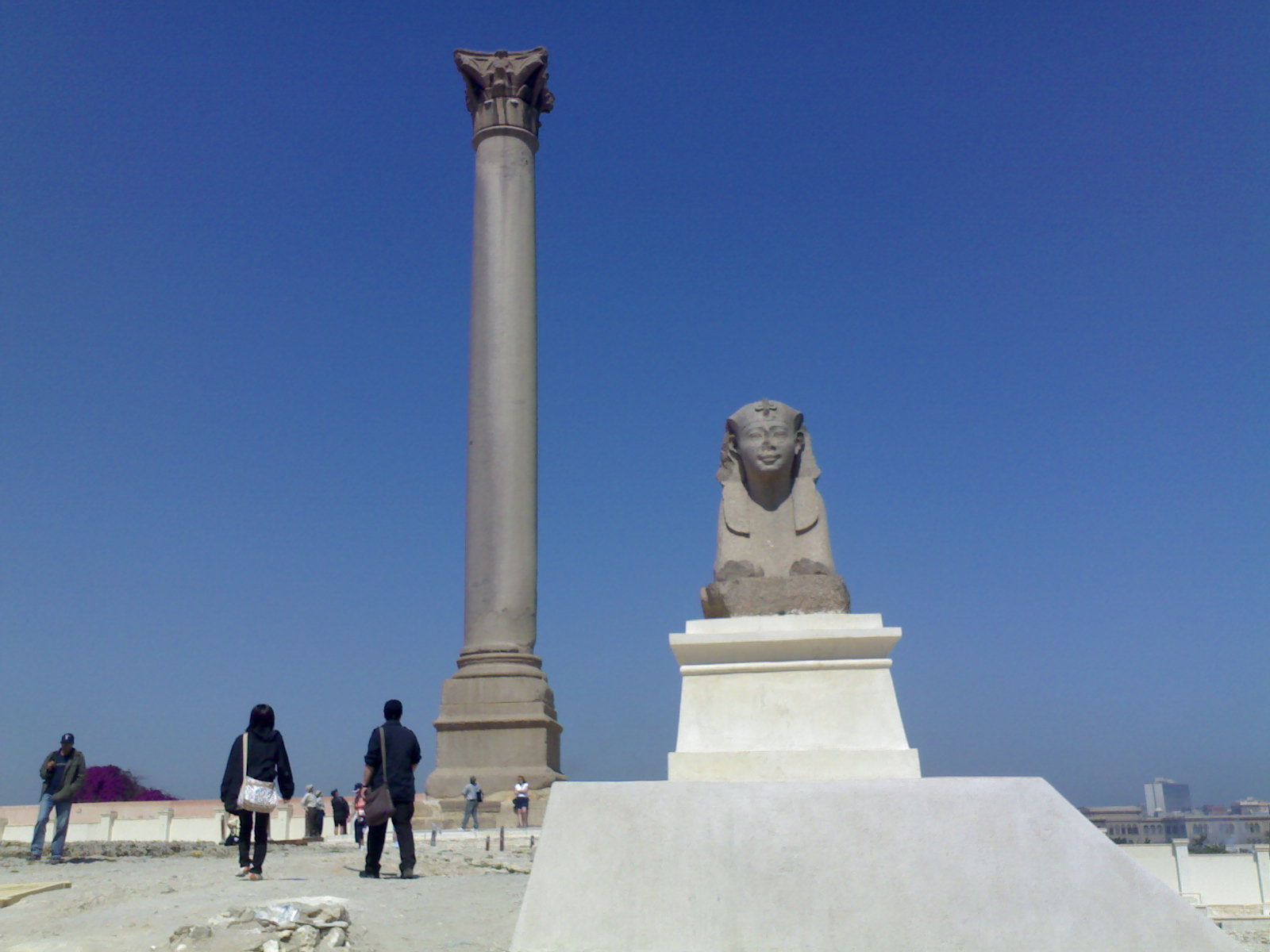
Pompey's Pillar, the highest free-standing monolithic ancient Corinthian column (26.85 m)

- The tallest victory column in Constantinople was the Column of Theodosius, which no longer exists, with the height of its top above ground being c. 50 m. The Column of Arcadius, whose 10.5 m base alone survives, was c. 46.1 m high. The Column of Constantine may originally have been as high as 40 m above the pavement of the Forum. The height of the Column of Justinian is unclear, but it may have been even larger. The height of each of these monuments was originally even higher, as all were further crowned with a colossal imperial statue several times life-size.
- The tallest victory column in Rome was the Column of Marcus Aurelius, Rome, with the height of its top above ground being c. 39.72 m. It thus exceeds its earlier model, Trajan's Column, by 4.65 m, chiefly due to its higher pedestal.
- The tallest monolithic column was Pompey's Pillar in Alexandria which is 26.85 m high with its base and capital and whose monolithic column shaft measures 20.75 m. The statue of Diocletian atop "Pompey's" Pillar was itself approximately 7 m tall.
- The tallest Corinthian colonnade, a style which was particularly popular in Roman monumental construction, adorned the Temple of Jupiter at Baalbek, reaching a height of 19.82 m including base and capital; their shafts measure 16.64 m high. The next two tallest are those of the Temple of Mars Ultor in Rome and of the Athenian Olympieion which are 17.74 m (14.76 m) respectively 16.83 m (14 m) high. These are followed by a group of three virtually identical high Corinthian orders in Rome: the Hadrianeum, the Temple of Apollo Sosianus and the Temple of Castor and Pollux, all of which are in the order of 14.8 m (12.4 m) height.

== Dams ==
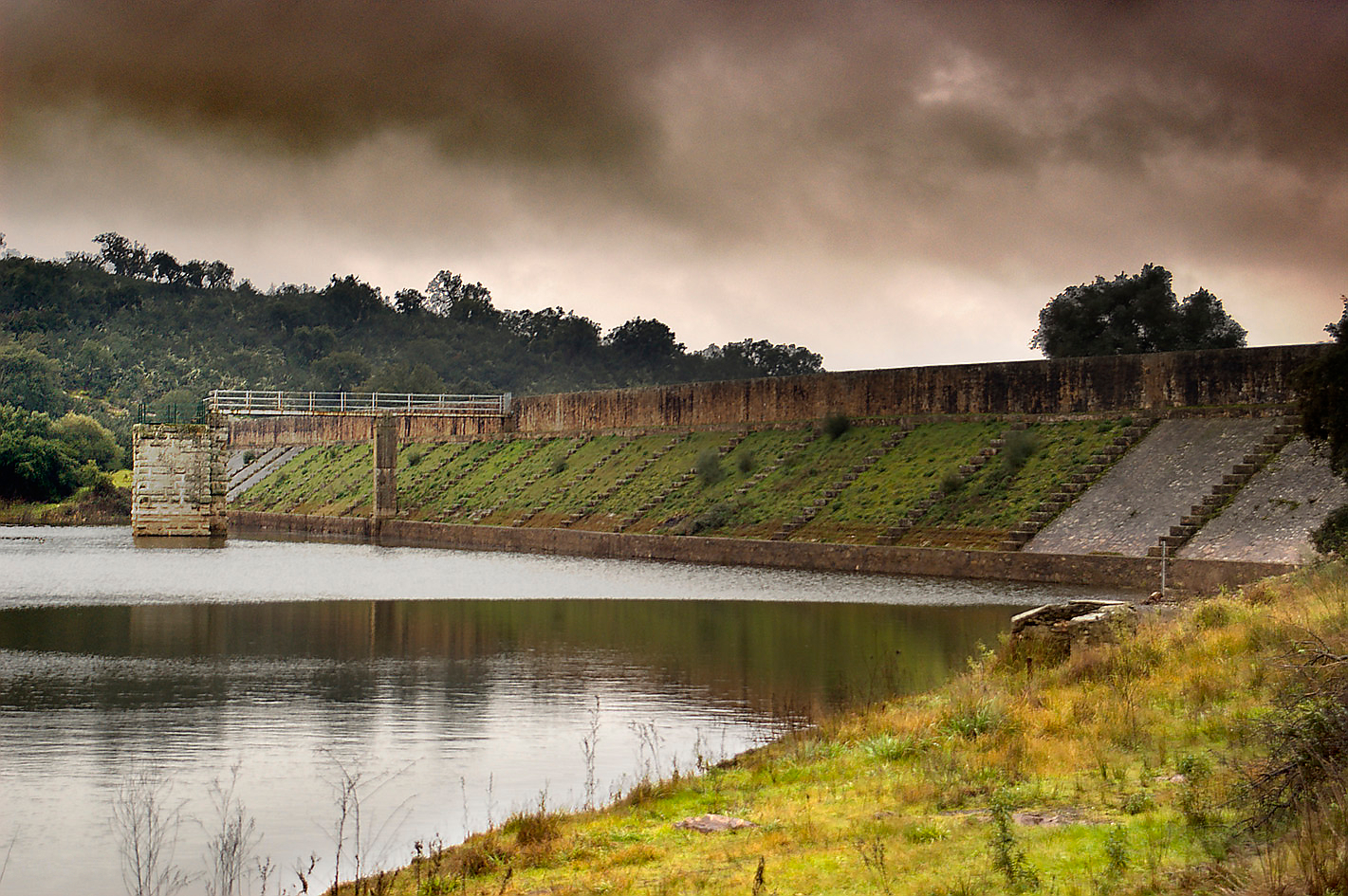
The dam at Cornalvo, Spain, is one of the tallest Roman dams still in use (28 m).

- The oldest arch dam was the Glanum Dam in the French Provence. Since its remains were nearly obliterated by a 19th-century dam on the same spot, its reconstruction relies on prior documentation, according to which the Roman dam was 12 m high, 3.9 m wide and 18 m long at the crest. Being the earliest known arch dam, it remained unique in antiquity and beyond (aside from the Dara Dam whose dimensions are unknown).
- The earliest surviving arch dam, and the only ancient arch dam still functioning, is the Iron Gate at Antioch. Built in the mid-sixth century to control the Parmenios stream, it combined the functionalities of a road bridge, an aqueduct bridge, a city wall, and a dam. It was 30 m wide, 36 m tall, and 7.1 m thick. Although the buildings it was connected to have been destroyed over the centuries, and the structure itself substantially eroded, the Iron Gate still functions as a dam, as it has done for 1,450 years.
- The largest arch-gravity dam was the Kasserine Dam in Tunisia, arguably the biggest Roman dam in North Africa with 150 m length by 10 m height by 7.3 m width. However, despite its curved nature, it is uncertain whether the 2nd century AD dam structurally acted by arching action and not solely by its sheer weight; in this case it would be classified as a gravity dam and considerably smaller structures in Turkey or the Spanish Puy Foradado Dam would move up in this category (see sortable List of Roman dams).
- The longest buttress dam was the 632+ m long Consuegra Dam (3rd–4th century AD) in central Spain which is still fairly well preserved. Instead of an earth embankment, its only 1.3 m thick retaining wall was supported on the downstream side by buttresses in regular intervals of 5 to 10 m. In Spain, a large number of ancient buttress dams are concentrated, representing nearly one-third of the total found there.
- The longest gravity dam, and longest dam overall, impounds Lake Homs in Syria. Built in 284 AD by emperor Diocletian for irrigation, the 2,000 m long and 7 m high masonry dam consists of a concrete core protected by basalt ashlar. The lake, 6 miles long by 2.5 miles wide, had a capacity of 90 million m^{3}, making it the biggest Roman reservoir in the Near East and possibly the largest artificial lake constructed up to that time. Enlarged in the 1930s, it is still a landmark of Homs which it continues to supply with water. Further notable dams in this category include the little-studied 900 m long Wadi Caam II dam at Leptis Magna and the Spanish dams at Alcantarilla and at Consuegra.
- The tallest dam belonged to the Subiaco Dams at the central Italian town of the same name. Constructed by Nero (54–68 AD) as an adjunct to his villa on the Aniene river, the three reservoirs were highly unusual in their time for serving recreational rather than utilitarian purposes. The biggest dam of the group is estimated to have reached a height of 50 m. It remained unsurpassed in the world until its accidental destruction in 1305 by two monks who fatally removed cover stones from the top. Also quite tall structures were Almonacid de la Cuba Dam (34 m), Cornalvo Dam (28 m) and Proserpina Dam (21.6 m), all of which are located in Spain and still of substantially Roman fabric.

== Domes ==
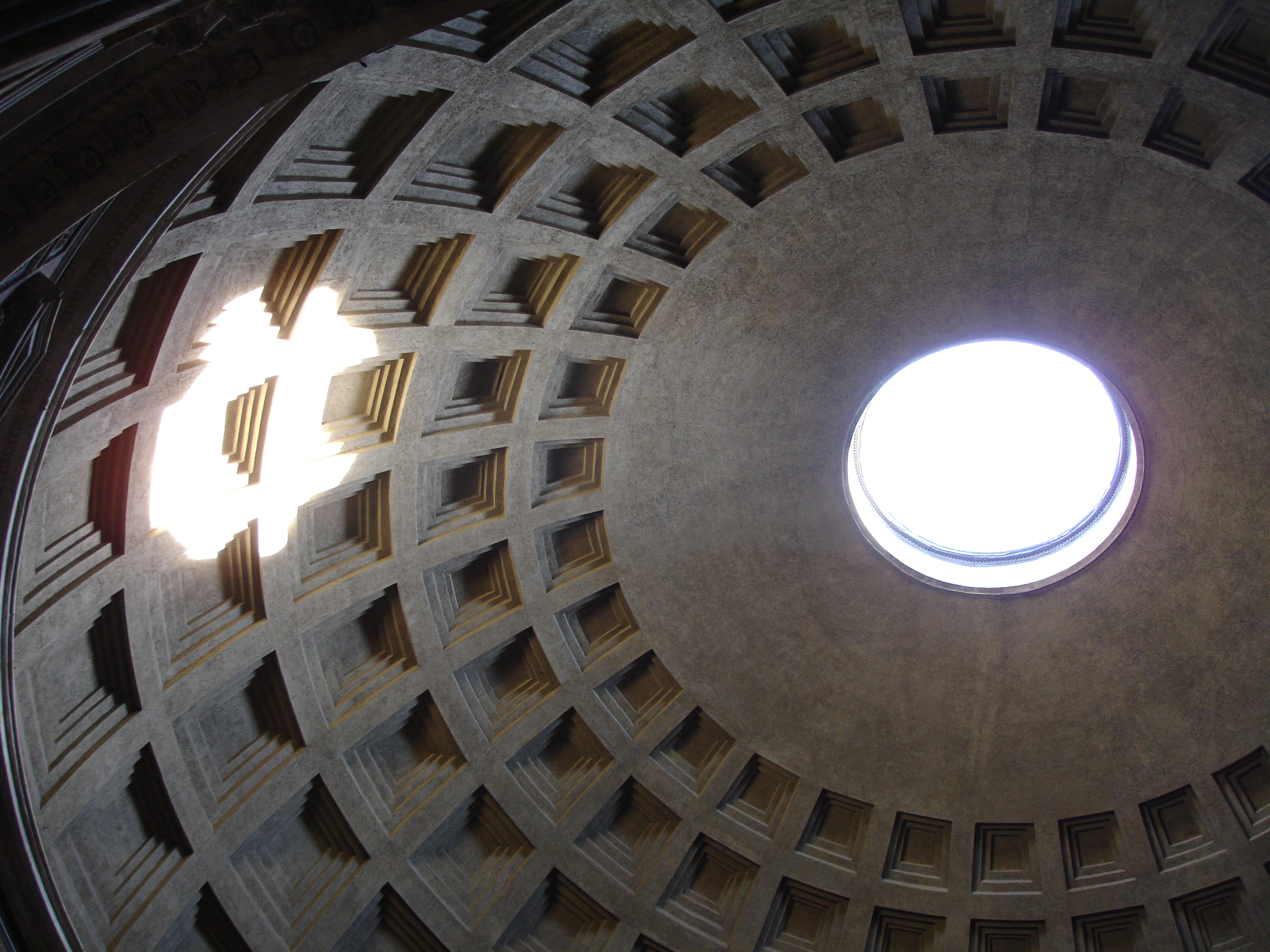
Interior of the Pantheon dome

- The largest dome in the world for more than 1,700 years was the Pantheon in Rome. Its concrete dome spans an interior space of 43.45 m, which corresponds exactly to its height from floor to top. Its apex concludes with an 8.95 m wide oculus. The structure remained unsurpassed until 1881 and stills holds the title of the largest unreinforced solid concrete dome in the world. The Pantheon has exercised an immense influence on Western dome construction to this day.
- The largest dome out of clay hollowware ever constructed is the caldarium of the Baths of Caracalla in Rome. The now ruined dome, completed in 216 AD, had an inner diameter of 35.08 m. For reduction of weight its shell was constructed of amphora joined together, a quite new method then which could do without time-consuming wooden centring.
- The largest half-domes were found in the Baths of Trajan in Rome, completed in 109 AD. Several exedrae integrated into the enclosure wall of the compound reached spans up to 30 m.
- The largest stone dome was the Western Thermae in Gerasa, Jordan, constructed around 150–175 AD. The 15 m wide dome of the bath complex was also one of the earliest of its kind with a square ground plan.

== Fortifications ==
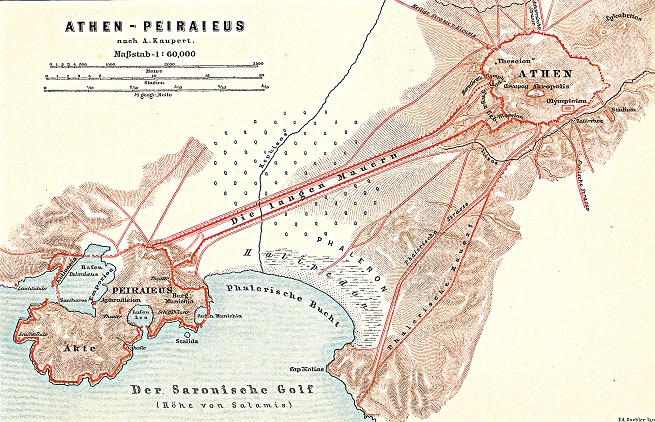
The Long Walls and the Phaleric Wall connecting landlocked Athens with its port Peiraeus (5th c. BC)

- The longest city walls were those of Classical Athens. Their extraordinary length was due to the construction of the famous Long Walls which played a key role in the city's maritime strategy, by providing it with a secure access to the sea and offering the population of Attica a retreat zone in case of foreign invasions. At the eve of the Peloponnesian War (431–404 BC), Thucydides gave the length of the entire circuit as follows: 43 stades (7.6 km) for the city walls without the southwestern section covered by others walls and 60 stades (10.6 km) for the circumference of the Peiraeus port. A corridor between these two was established by the northern Long Wall (40 stades or 7.1 km) and the Phaleric Wall (35 stades or 6.2 km). Assuming a value of 177.6 m for one Attic stade, the overall length of the walls of Athens thus measured about 31.6 km. The structure, consisting of sun-dried bricks built on a foundation of limestone blocks, was dismantled after Athens' defeat in 404 BC, but rebuilt a decade later. Syracuse, Rome (Aurelian Walls) and Constantinople (Walls of Constantinople) were also protected by very long circuit walls.

== Monoliths ==
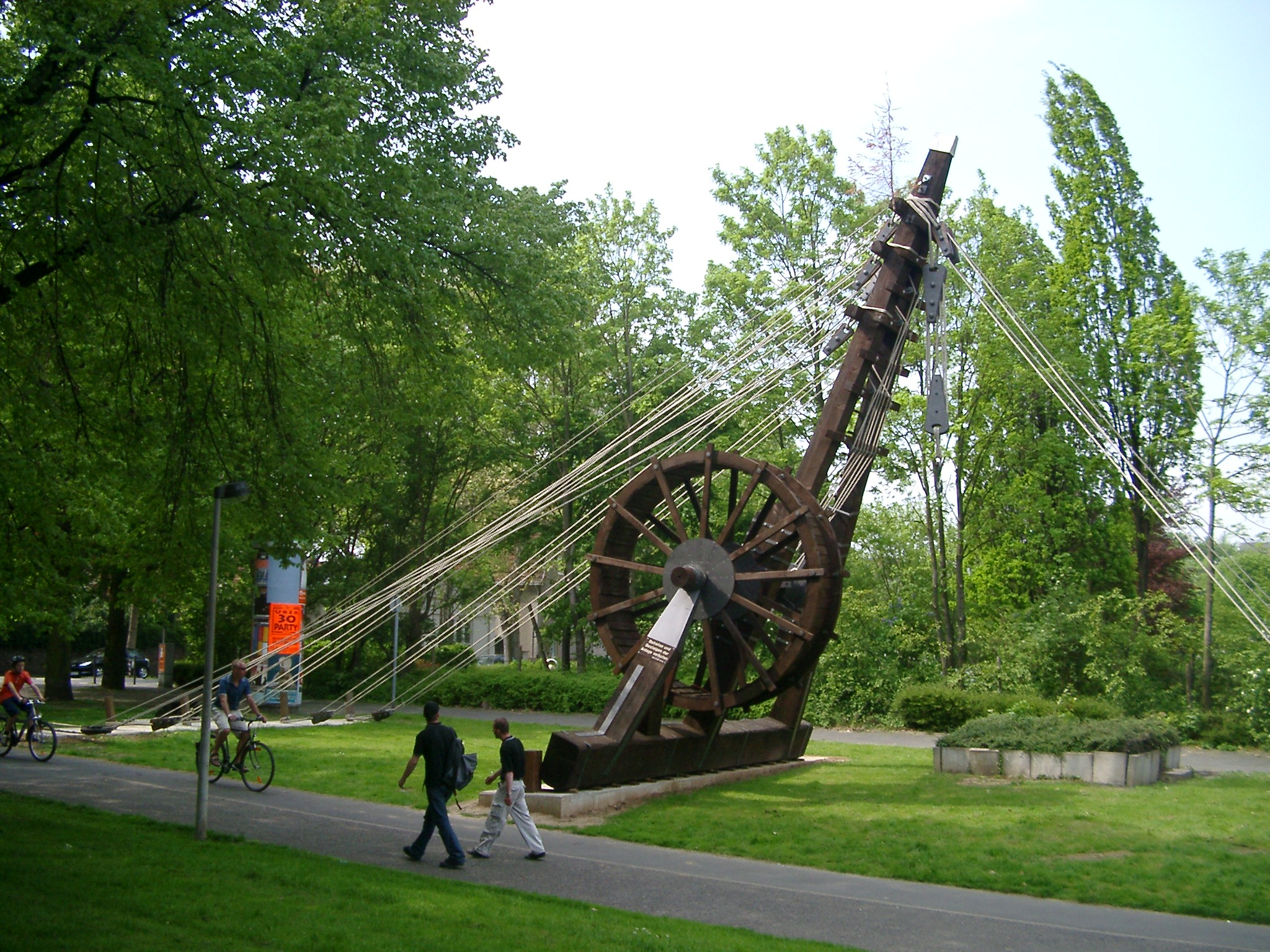
Reconstructed Roman treadwheel crane

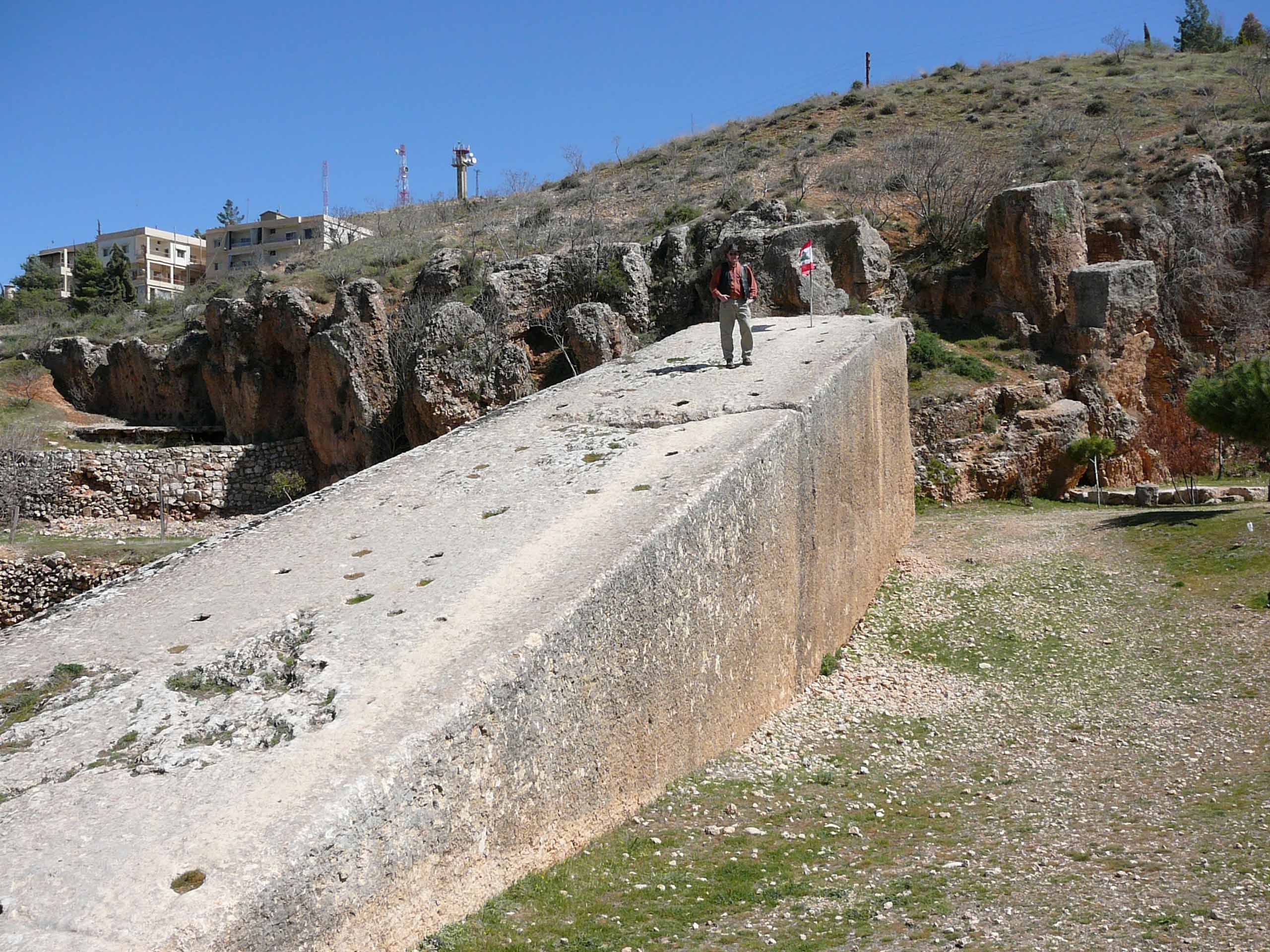
Stone of the Pregnant Woman, the second largest monolith quarried, weighs c. 1,000 t

- The largest monolith lifted by a single crane can be determined from the characteristic lewis iron holes (each of which points at the use of one crane) in the lifted stone block. By dividing its weight by their number, one arrives at a maximum lifting capacity of 7.5 to 8 t as exemplified by a cornice block at the Trajan's Forum and the architrave blocks of the Temple of Jupiter at Baalbek. Based on a detailed Roman relief of a construction crane, the engineer O'Connor calculates a slightly less lifting capability, 6.2 t, for such a type of treadwheel crane, on the assumption that it was powered by five men and using a three-pulley block.
- The largest monolith lifted by cranes was the 108 t heavy corner cornice block of the Jupiter temple at Baalbek, followed by an architrave block weighing 63 t, both of which were raised to a height of about 19 m. The capital block of Trajan's Column, with a weight of 53.3 t, was even lifted to c. 34 m above the ground. As such enormous loads far exceeded the lifting capability of any single treadwheel crane, it is assumed that Roman engineers set up a four-masted lifting tower in the midst of which the stone blocks were vertically raised by the means of capstans placed on the ground around it.
- The largest monoliths hewn were two giant building blocks in the quarry of Baalbek: an unnamed rectangular block which was only recently discovered is measured at c. 20 m x 4.45 m x 4.5 m, yielding a weight of 1,242 t. The similarly shaped Stone of the Pregnant Woman nearby weighs an estimated 1,000.12 t. Both limestone blocks were intended for the Roman temple district nearby, possibly as an addition to the trilithon, but were left for unknown reasons at their quarrying sites.
- The largest monolith moved was the trilithon, a group of three monumental blocks in the podium of the Jupiter temple at Baalbek. The individual stones are 19.60 m, 19.30 m and 19.10 m long respectively, with a depth of 3.65 m and a height of 4.34 m. Weighing approximately 800 t on average, they were transported a distance of 800 m from the quarry and probably pulled by the means of ropes and capstans into their final position. The supporting stone layer beneath features a number of blocks which are still in the order of 350 t. The various giant stones of Roman Baalbek rank high among the largest man-made monoliths in history.
- The largest monolithic columns were used by Roman builders who preferred them over the stacked drums typical of classical Greek architecture. The logistics and technology involved in the transport and erection of extra-large single-piece columns were demanding: As a rule of thumb, the weight of the column shafts in the length range between 40 and 60 Roman feet (c. 11.8 to 17.8 m) doubled with every ten feet from c. 50 over 100 to 200 t. Despite this, forty and also fifty feet tall monolithic shafts can be found in a number of Roman buildings, but examples reaching sixty feet are only in evidence in two unfinished granite columns which still lie in the Roman quarry of Mons Claudianus, Egypt. One of the pair, which was discovered only in the 1930s, has an estimated weight of 207 t. All these dimensions, however, are surpassed by Pompey's Pillar, a free-standing victory column erected in Alexandria in 297 AD: measuring 20.46 m high with a diameter of 2.71 m at its base, the weight of its granite shaft has been put at 285 t.
- The largest monolithic dome crowned the early 6th century AD Mausoleum of Theodoric in Ravenna, then capital of the Ostrogothic kingdom. The weight of the single, 10.76 m wide roof slab has been calculated at 230 t.

== Obelisks ==
- The tallest obelisks are all located in Rome, adorning its inner-city squares. The Agonalis obelisk on Piazza Navona stands highest at 16.54 m without pedestal, followed by the Esquiline, Quirinale (both 14.7 m), Sallustiano (13.92 m) and the somewhat smaller Pinciano obelisk. Only some of them were inscribed with hieroglyphs, while others remained blank. These five obelisks of Roman date complement a group of eight ancient Egyptian obelisks which were carried on imperial order by obelisk carriers from the Nile to the Tiber, elevating Rome to the city with the most ancient obelisks to this day.

== Roads ==
- The longest trackway was the Diolkos near Corinth, Greece, measuring between 6 and 8.5 km. The paved roadway allowed boats to be pulled across the Isthmus of Corinth, thus avoiding the long and dangerous sea trip around the Peloponnese peninsula. Working by the railway principle, with a gauge of around 160 cm between two parallel grooves cut into the limestone paving, it remained in regular and frequent service for at least 650 years. By comparison, the world's first overland wagonway, the Wollaton Wagonway of 1604, ran for c. 3 km.

== Roofs ==
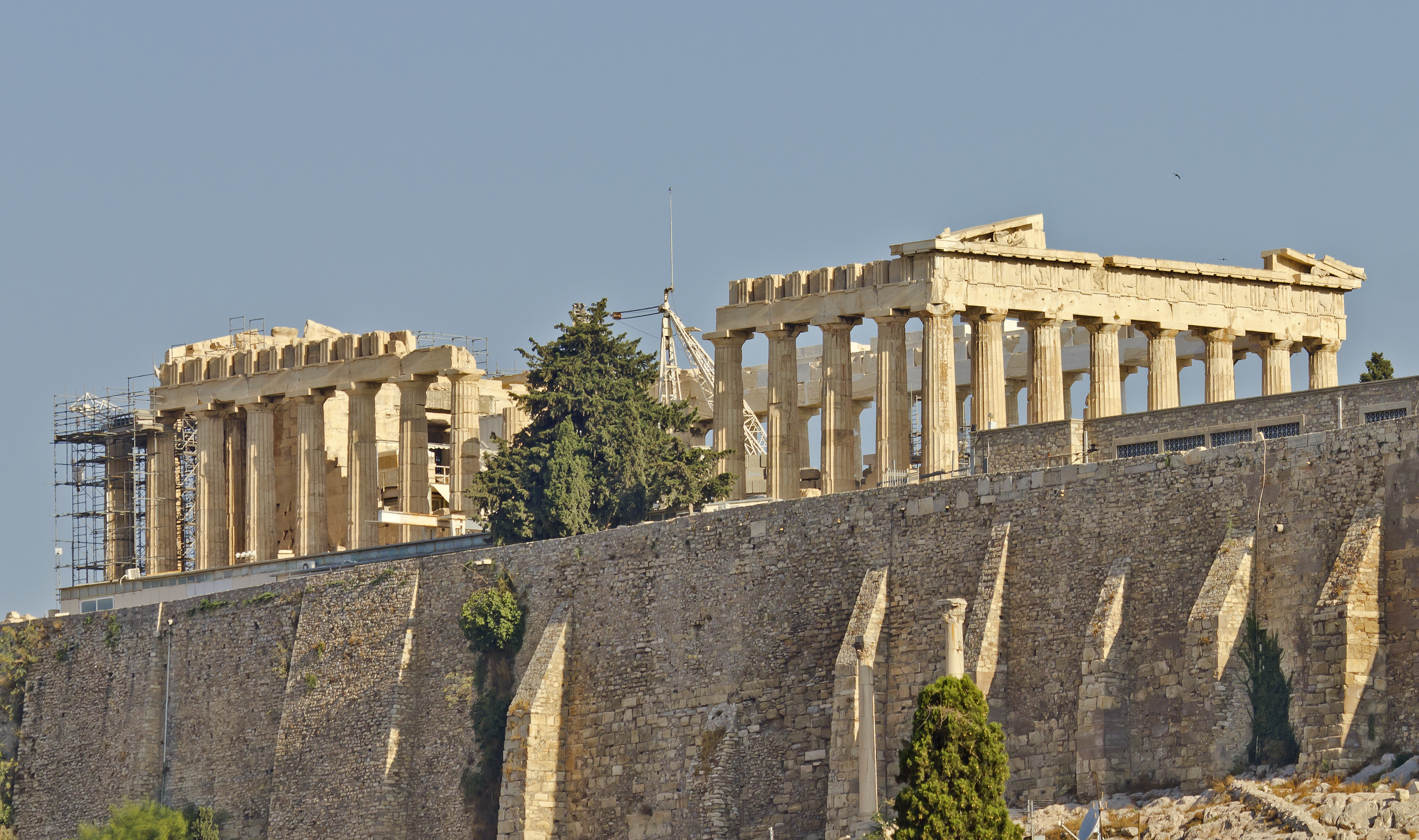
Parthenon in Athens

- The largest post and lintel roof by span spanned the Parthenon in Athens. It measured 19.20 m between the cella walls, with an unsupported span of 11.05 m between the interior colonnades. Sicilian temples of the time featured slightly larger cross sections, but these may have been covered by truss roofs instead.
- The largest truss roof by span covered the Aula Regia (throne room) built for emperor Domitian (81–96 AD) on the Palatine Hill, Rome. The timber truss roof had a width of 31.67 m, slightly surpassing the postulated limit of 30 m for Roman roof constructions. Tie-beam trusses allowed for much larger spans than the older prop-and-lintel system and even concrete vaulting: Nine out of the ten largest rectangular spaces in Roman architecture were bridged this way, the only exception being the groin vaulted Basilica of Maxentius.

== Tunnels ==
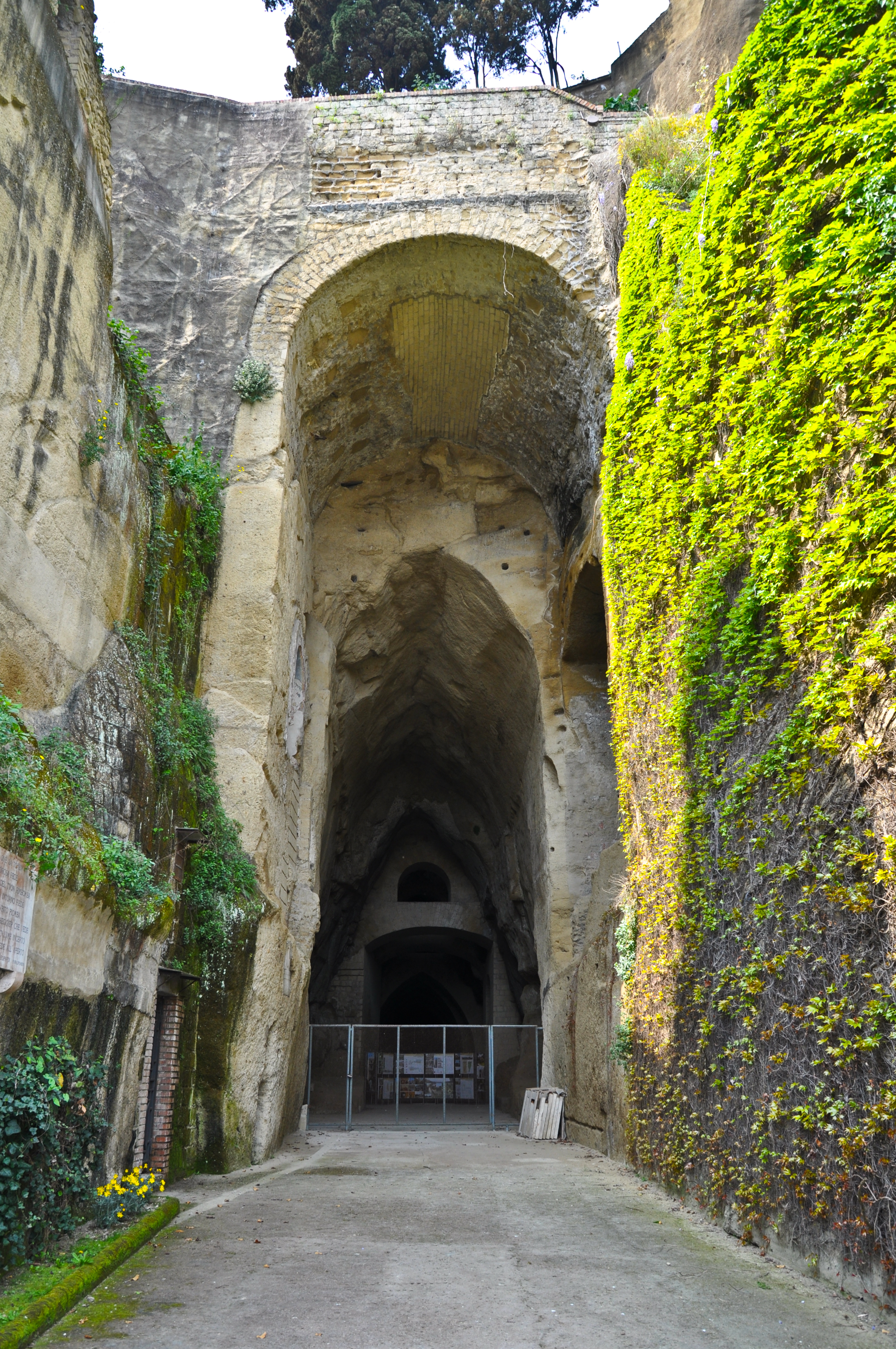
Entrance to the 750 m long Crypta Neapolitana, one of the largest Roman road tunnels

- The deepest tunnel was the Tunnels of Claudius, constructed in eleven years time by emperor Claudius (41–54 AD). Draining the Fucine Lake, the largest Italian inland water, 100 km east of Rome, it is widely deemed as the most ambitious Roman tunnel project as it stretched ancient technology to its limits. The 5653 m long qanat tunnel, passing under Monte Salviano, features vertical shafts up to 122 m depth; even longer ones were run obliquely through the rock. After repairs under Trajan and Hadrian, the Claudius tunnel remained in use until the end of antiquity. Various attempts at restoration succeeded only in the late 19th century.
- The longest road tunnel was the Cocceius Tunnel near Naples, Italy, which connected Cumae with the base of the Roman fleet, Portus Julius. The 1000 m long tunnel was part of an extensive underground network which facilitated troop movements between the various Roman facilities in the volcanic area. Built by the architect Cocceius Auctus, it featured paved access roads and well-built mouthes. Other road tunnels include the Crypta Neapolitana to Pozzuoli (750 m long, 3–4 m wide and 3–5 m high), and the similarly sized Grotta di Seiano.
- The longest qanat was the 94 km long Gadara Aqueduct in northern Jordan. This recently discovered structure provided for hundreds of years water for Adraa, Abila and Gadara, three cities of the ancient Decapolis. Only 35 km long as the crow flies, its length was almost tripled by following closely the contours of the local topography, avoiding valleys and mountain ridges alike. The monumental work seemed to be carried out in seven stages of construction between 130 and 193 AD. The distance between the individual vertical shafts was on average 50 m. Probably the project was initiated by Hadrian, who had granted privileges to the cities during a longer stay in the Decapolis. The aqueduct remained operational until the Byzantines lost control of the region after the Battle of Yarmuk in 636.
- The longest tunnel excavated from opposite ends was built around the end of the 6th century BC for draining and regulating Lake Nemi, Italy. Measuring 1600 m, it was almost 600 m longer than the slightly older Tunnel of Eupalinos on the isle of Samos, the first tunnel in history to be excavated from two ends with a methodical approach. The Albano Tunnel, also in central Italy, reaches a length of 1,400 m. It was excavated no later than 397 BC and is still in service. Determining the tunnelling direction underground and coordinating the advance of the separate work parties made meticulous surveying and execution on the part of the ancient engineers necessary.

== Vaulting ==
- The largest barrel vault by span covered the Temple of Venus and Roma, Rome. Built between 307 and 312 AD, the vaulted structure replaced the original timber truss roof from Hadrian's time.
- The largest groin vault by span roofed the 25.01 m wide main nave of the Basilica of Maxentius on the Forum Romanum, built in the early 4th century AD.

== Miscellaneous ==
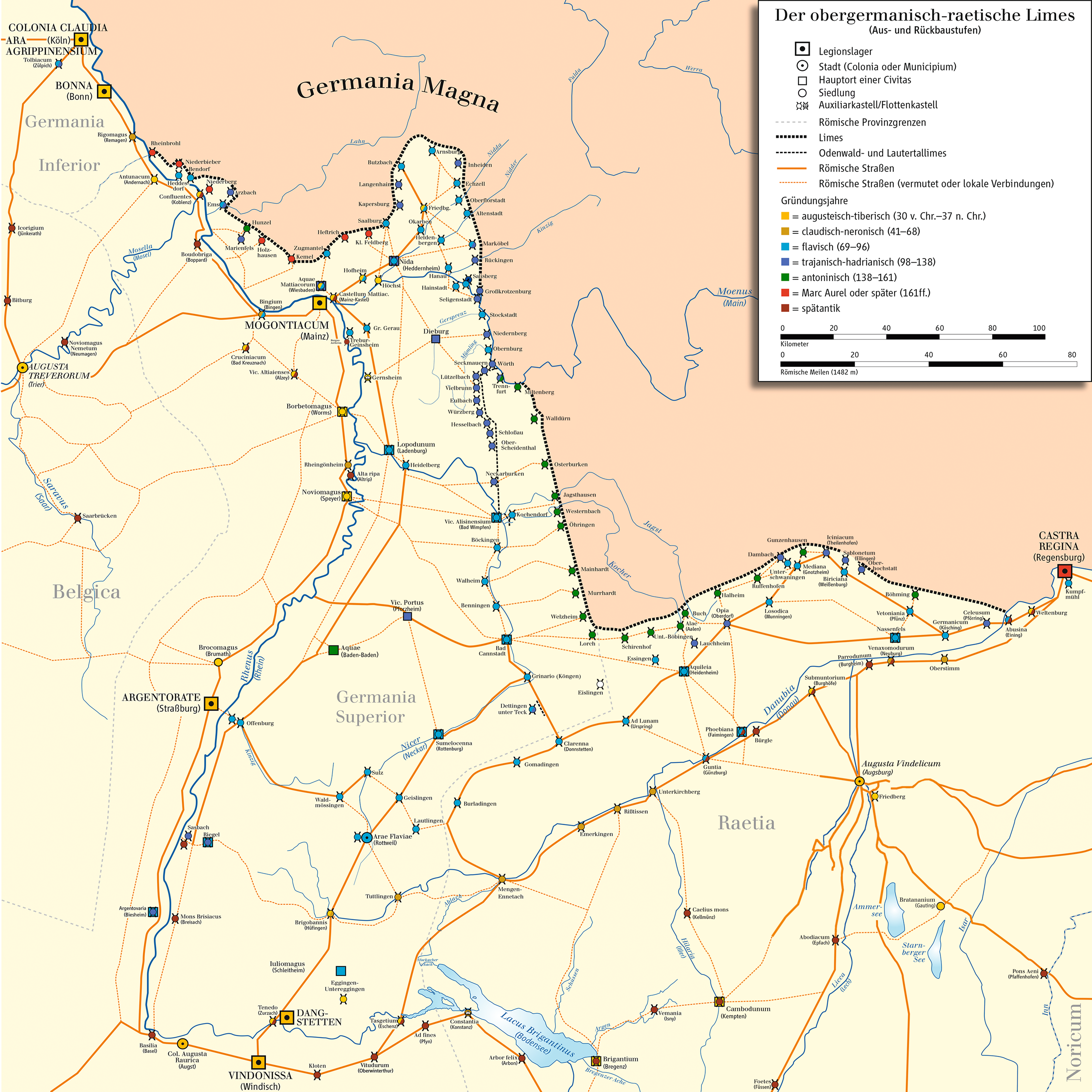
The longest straight alignment was a c. 80 km long section of the Limes in modern-day Germany. It ran between modern Walldürn and Lorch in the angle between Rhine and Danube, protecting the borders of Roman Germania.

- The greatest concentration of mechanical power was the Barbegal water mill complex in southern France, constructed in the early 2nd century AD. Sixteen overshot water wheels fed by an arcaded aqueduct branch from the main conduit to Arles produced an estimated 4.5 t of flour per 24 hours – an output sufficient to feed 12,500 people or the majority of the population of Arles. Water mill batteries are also known from Amida in Asia Minor, the Janiculum hill in Rome, and a number of other places throughout the Roman Empire.
- The longest spiral stair belonged to the 2nd century AD Trajan's Column in Rome. Measuring a height of 29.68 m, it surpassed its successor, the Column of Marcus Aurelius, by a mere 6 cm. Its treads were carved out ouf nineteen massive marble blocks so that each drum comprised a half-turn of seven steps. The quality of the craftsmanship was such that the staircase was practically even, and the joints between the huge blocks accurately fitting. The design of the Trajan's column had a profound influence on Roman construction technique, and the spiral stair became over time an establish architectural element.
- The longest straight alignment was constituted by an 81.259 km long section of the Roman limes in Germany. The fortified line ran through hilly and densely wooded country in completely linear fashion, deviating in its entire length only once, for a distance of 1.6 km, to avoid a steep valley. The extraordinary accuracy of the alignment has been attributed to the groma, a surveying instrument which was used by the Romans to great effect in land division and road construction.

== See also ==
- Ancient Greek architecture
- Greek technology
- Ancient Roman architecture
- Roman technology
- Roman engineering

== Sources ==
- Adam, Jean-Pierre (1977), "À propos du trilithon de Baalbek: Le transport et la mise en oeuvre des mégalithes", Syria, 54 (1/2): 31–63, doi:10.3406/syria.1977.6623
- Apostol, Tom M. (2004), "The Tunnel of Samos" (PDF), Engineering and Science (1): 30–40, archived from the original (PDF) on 14 July 2011
- Arenillas, Miguel; Castillo, Juan C. (2003), "Dams from the Roman Era in Spain. Analysis of Design Forms (with Appendix)", 1st International Congress on Construction History [20th–24th January], Madrid
- Beckmann, Martin (2002), "The 'Columnae Coc(h)lides' of Trajan and Marcus Aurelius", Phoenix, 56 (3/4): 348–357, doi:10.2307/1192605, JSTOR 1192605
- Burns, Alfred (1971), "The Tunnel of Eupalinus and the Tunnel Problem of Hero of Alexandria", Isis, 62 (2): 172–185, doi:10.1086/350729, S2CID 145064628
- Cook, R. M. (1979), "Archaic Greek Trade: Three Conjectures 1. The Diolkos", The Journal of Hellenic Studies, 99: 152–155, doi:10.2307/630641, JSTOR 630641, S2CID 161378605
- O'Connor, Colin (1993), Roman Bridges, Cambridge University Press, ISBN 0-521-39326-4
- Coulton, J. J. (1974), "Lifting in Early Greek Architecture", The Journal of Hellenic Studies, 94: 1–19, doi:10.2307/630416, JSTOR 630416, S2CID 162973494
- Davies, Paul; Hemsoll, David; Jones, Mark Wilson (1987), "The Pantheon: Triumph of Rome or Triumph of Compromise?", Art History, 10 (2): 133–153, doi:10.1111/j.1467-8365.1987.tb00247.x
- Döring, Mathias (2007), "Wasser für Gadara. 94 km langer antiker Tunnel im Norden Jordaniens entdeckt" (PDF), Querschnitt (21), Darmstadt University of Applied Sciences: 24–35, archived from the original (PDF) on 11 January 2016
- Drijvers, J.W. (1992), "Strabo VIII 2,1 (C335): Porthmeia and the Diolkos", Mnemosyne, 45: 75–78
- Döring, Mathias (1998), "Die römische Wasserleitung von Pondel (Aostatal)", Antike Welt, 29 (2): 127–134
- Döring, Mathias (2024). "Powerful Springs and Dangerous Torrents on Unsafe Ground: The Hydraulic Engineering Buildings of Antioch and Seleucia Pieria". In De Giorgi, Andrea U. (ed.). Antioch on the Orontes: History, Society, Ecology, and Visual Culture. Cambridge: Cambridge University Press. pp. 164–180. ISBN 978-1-1089-8898-8.
- Durán Fuentes, Manuel (2004), La Construcción de Puentes Romanos en Hispania, Santiago de Compostela: Xunta de Galicia, ISBN 978-84-453-3937-4
- Fernández Troyano, Leonardo (2003), Bridge Engineering. A Global Perspective, London: Thomas Telford Publishing, ISBN 0-7277-3215-3
- Frunzio, G.; Monaco, M.; Gesualdo, A. (2001), "3D F.E.M. Analysis of a Roman Arch Bridge", in Lourenço, P.B.; Roca, P. (eds.), Historical Constructions (PDF), Guimarães: University of Minho, pp. 591–597, archived from the original (PDF) on 21 August 2007
- Galliazzo, Vittorio (1995), I ponti romani, vol. 1, Treviso: Edizioni Canova, ISBN 88-85066-66-6
- Galliazzo, Vittorio (1994), I ponti romani. Catalogo generale (in Italian), vol. 2, Treviso: Edizioni Canova, pp. 319f. (No. 645), ISBN 88-85066-66-6
- Greene, Kevin (2000), "Technological Innovation and Economic Progress in the Ancient World: M.I. Finley Re-Considered", The Economic History Review, New Series, 53 (1): 29–59, doi:10.1111/1468-0289.00151, hdl:10.1111/1468-0289.00151
- Grewe, Klaus; Özis, Ünal (1994), "Die antiken Flußüberbauungen von Pergamon und Nysa (Türkei)", Antike Welt, 25 (4): 348–352
- Grewe, Klaus (1998), Licht am Ende des Tunnels. Planung und Trassierung im antiken Tunnelbau, Mainz: Verlag Philipp von Zabern, ISBN 3-8053-2492-8
- Habachi, Labib; Vogel, Carola (2000), Die unsterblichen Obelisken Ägyptens, Mainz: Verlag Philipp von Zabern, ISBN 3-8053-2658-0
- Hartung, Fritz; Kuros, Gh. R. (1987), "Historische Talsperren im Iran", in Garbrecht, Günther (ed.), Historische Talsperren, vol. 1, Stuttgart: Verlag Konrad Wittwer, pp. 221–274, ISBN 3-87919-145-X
- Heidenreich, Robert; Johannes, Heinz (1971), Das Grabmal Theoderichs zu Ravenna, Wiesbaden: Franz Steiner Verlag
- Heinle, Erwin; Schlaich, Jörg (1996), Kuppeln aller Zeiten, aller Kulturen, Stuttgart: Deutsche Verlagsanstalt, ISBN 3-421-03062-6
- Heinrich, Bert (1983), Brücken. Vom Balken zum Bogen, Hamburg: Rowohlt, ISBN 3-499-17711-0
- Hodge, A. Trevor (1960), The Woodwork of Greek Roofs, Cambridge University Press
- Hodge, A. Trevor (1992), Roman Aqueducts & Water Supply, London: Duckworth, ISBN 0-7156-2194-7
- Hodge, A. Trevor (2000), "Reservoirs and Dams", in Wikander, Örjan (ed.), Handbook of Ancient Water Technology, Technology and Change in History, vol. 2, Leiden: Brill, pp. 331–339, ISBN 90-04-11123-9
- Huff, Dietrich (2010), "Bridges. Pre-Islamic Bridges", in Yarshater, Ehsan (ed.), Encyclopædia Iranica Online
- James, Patrick; Chanson, Hubert (2002), "Historical Development of Arch Dams. From Roman Arch Dams to Modern Concrete Designs", Australian Civil Engineering Transactions, CE43: 39–56
- Jones, Mark Wilson (1993), "One Hundred Feet and a Spiral Stair: The Problem of Designing Trajan's Column", Journal of Roman Archaeology, 6: 23–38, doi:10.1017/S1047759400011454, S2CID 250348951
- Jones, Mark Wilson (2000), Principles of Roman Architecture, Yale University Press, ISBN 0-300-08138-3
- Klein, Nancy L. (1998), "Evidence for West Greek Influence on Mainland Greek Roof Construction and the Creation of the Truss in the Archaic Period", Hesperia, 67 (4): 335–374, doi:10.2307/148449, JSTOR 148449
- Kleiss, Wolfram (1983), "Brückenkonstruktionen in Iran", Architectura, 13: 105–112 (106)
- Kramers, J. H. (2010), "Shushtar", in Bearman, P. (ed.), Encyclopaedia of Islam (2nd ed.), Brill Online
- Lancaster, Lynne (1999), "Building Trajan's Column", American Journal of Archaeology, 103 (3): 419–439, doi:10.2307/506969, JSTOR 506969, S2CID 192986322
- Lancaster, Lynne (2008), "Roman Engineering and Construction", in Oleson, John Peter (ed.), The Oxford Handbook of Engineering and Technology in the Classical World, Oxford University Press, pp. 256–284, ISBN 978-0-19-518731-1
- Lewis, M. J. T. (2001a), Surveying Instruments of Greece and Rome, Cambridge University Press, ISBN 0-521-79297-5
- Lewis, M. J. T. (2001b), "Railways in the Greek and Roman world", in Guy, A.; Rees, J. (eds.), Early Railways. A Selection of Papers from the First International Early Railways Conference (PDF), pp. 8–19, archived from the original (PDF) on 21 July 2011
- Mark, Robert; Hutchinson, Paul (1986), "On the Structure of the Roman Pantheon", Art Bulletin, 68 (1): 24–34, doi:10.2307/3050861, JSTOR 3050861
- Maxfield, Valerie A. (2001), "Stone Quarrying in the Eastern Desert with Particular Reference to Mons Claudianus and Mons Porphyrites", in Mattingly, David J.; Salmon, John (eds.), Economies Beyond Agriculture in the Classical World, Leicester-Nottingham Studies in Ancient Society, vol. 9, London: Routledge, pp. 143–170, ISBN 0-415-21253-7
- Müller, Werner (2005), dtv-Atlas Baukunst I. Allgemeiner Teil: Baugeschichte von Mesopotamien bis Byzanz (14th ed.), Deutscher Taschenbuch Verlag, ISBN 3-423-03020-8
- Raepsaet, G.; Tolley, M. (1993), "Le Diolkos de l'Isthme à Corinthe: son tracé, son fonctionnement", Bulletin de Correspondance Hellénique, 117 (1): 233–261, doi:10.3406/bch.1993.1679
- Rasch, Jürgen (1985), "Die Kuppel in der römischen Architektur. Entwicklung, Formgebung, Konstruktion", Architectura, 15: 117–139
- Ruprechtsberger, Erwin M. (1999), "Vom Steinbruch zum Jupitertempel von Heliopolis/Baalbek (Libanon)", Linzer Archäologische Forschungen, 30: 7–56
- Scaife, C. H. O. (1953), "The Origin of Some Pantheon Columns", The Journal of Roman Studies, 43: 37, doi:10.2307/297777, JSTOR 297777, S2CID 161273729
- Schnitter, Niklaus (1978), "Römische Talsperren", Antike Welt, 8 (2): 25–32
- Schnitter, Niklaus (1987a), "Verzeichnis geschichtlicher Talsperren bis Ende des 17. Jahrhunderts", in Garbrecht, Günther (ed.), Historische Talsperren, vol. 1, Stuttgart: Verlag Konrad Wittwer, pp. 9–20, ISBN 3-87919-145-X
- Schnitter, Niklaus (1987b), "Die Entwicklungsgeschichte der Pfeilerstaumauer", in Garbrecht, Günther (ed.), Historische Talsperren, vol. 1, Stuttgart: Verlag Konrad Wittwer, pp. 57–74, ISBN 3-87919-145-X
- Schnitter, Niklaus (1987c), "Die Entwicklungsgeschichte der Bogenstaumauer", in Garbrecht, Günther (ed.), Historische Talsperren, vol. 1, Stuttgart: Verlag Konrad Wittwer, pp. 75–96, ISBN 3-87919-145-X
- Schörner, Hadwiga (2000), "Künstliche Schiffahrtskanäle in der Antike. Der sogenannte antike Suez-Kanal", Skyllis, 3 (1): 28–43
- Scranton, Robert L. (1938), "The Fortifications of Athens at the Opening of the Peloponnesian War", American Journal of Archaeology, 42 (4): 525–536, doi:10.2307/499185, JSTOR 499185, S2CID 191370973
- Smith, Norman (1970), "The Roman Dams of Subiaco", Technology and Culture, 11 (1): 58–68, doi:10.2307/3102810, JSTOR 3102810, S2CID 111915102
- Smith, Norman (1971), A History of Dams, London: Peter Davies, pp. 25–49, ISBN 0-432-15090-0
- Tudor, D. (1974), "Le pont de Constantin le Grand à Celei", Les ponts romains du Bas-Danube, Bibliotheca Historica Romaniae Études, vol. 51, Bucharest: Editura Academiei Republicii Socialiste România, pp. 135–166
- Ulrich, Roger B. (2007), Roman Woodworking, New Haven, Conn.: Yale University Press, ISBN 978-0-300-10341-0
- Verdelis, Nikolaos (1957), "Le diolkos de L'Isthme", Bulletin de Correspondance Hellénique, 81 (1): 526–529, doi:10.3406/bch.1957.2388
- Vogel, Alexius (1987), "Die historische Entwicklung der Gewichtsmauer", in Garbrecht, Günther (ed.), Historische Talsperren, vol. 1, Stuttgart: Verlag Konrad Wittwer, pp. 47–56 (50), ISBN 3-87919-145-X
- Werner, Walter (1997), "The Largest Ship Trackway in Ancient Times: the Diolkos of the Isthmus of Corinth, Greece, and Early Attempts to Build a Canal", The International Journal of Nautical Archaeology, 26 (2): 98–119, doi:10.1111/j.1095-9270.1997.tb01322.x
- Wilson, Andrew (2001), "Water-Mills at Amida: Ammianus Marcellinus 18.8.11" (PDF), The Classical Quarterly, vol. 51, no. 1, pp. 231–236, doi:10.1093/cq/51.1.231
- Wilson, Andrew (2002), "Machines, Power and the Ancient Economy", The Journal of Roman Studies, 92: 1–32, doi:10.2307/3184857, JSTOR 3184857, S2CID 154629776
- Wurster, Wolfgang W.; Ganzert, Joachim (1978), "Eine Brücke bei Limyra in Lykien", Archäologischer Anzeiger, Berlin: Deutsches Archäologisches Institut: 288–307, ISSN 0003-8105
