= Minerva between Geometry and Arithmetic =

Painting by Paolo Veronese

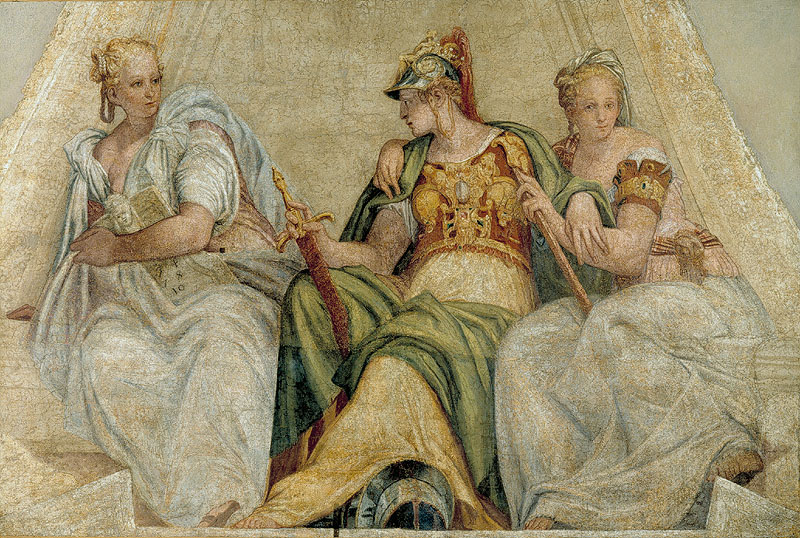
Minerva between Geometry and Arithmetic (1550) by Paolo Veronese

Minerva between Geometry and Arithmetic is a fresco fragment, usually attributed to Paolo Veronese, from 1550, but by some art historians to Anselmo Canera or Giambattista Zelotti. It was painted for the Palazzo de Soranzi in Castelfranco Veneto but is now in the Palazzo Balbi, in Venice.

The decorative scheme at the Palazzo de Soranzi was designed by Michele Sanmicheli for the Venetian patrician Piero Soranzo. He took on young painters from Verona to paint the frescoes in the four side-rooms, the main hall and the atrium – these included Giovanni Battista Zelotti, Anselmo Canera and Bernardino India, as well as Veronese. The numbers on Arithmetic's abacus may refer to those hidden by her hand (i.e. 1+2+5+6+9), the latter totalling 23, argued by some to symbolise either Veronese's age at the time or the year of Piero Soranzo and Francesca Emo's marriage, 1523. Others argue that the visible numbers on the abacus (3+4+7+8+10, totalling 32) refer to the length of Soranzo and Emo's had been married at the time they built the palazzo (i.e. 1550).

The Palazzo was completely demolished in 1817 on the orders of Francesco Maria Barbaro, its last owner. At the instigation of Giovanni (John) Vendramini from Bassano, the painter, chemist and mechanic Filippo Balbi removed some of the frescoes from the walls using a new technique and sold most of them to Vendramini himself, who was a London art dealer, lithographer and heir to his Portuguese father-in-law's fortune. Other fragments were donated to Castelfranco Veneto's cathedral and the Venice Seminary and sold to private collectors. An 1817 letter by Padre Barisan refers to 156 fragments being saved, though British and Italian newspapers of the time instead suggest 108, of which more than 60 went to London.

With several others from the Palazzo de Soranzi, the fragment showing Minerva appeared in a Maddox Street Galleries catalogue of 1826 as "Minerva between Mensuration and Calculation". The following year Vendramini produced a print of it entitled THE BELLONA. From The FRESCO PAINTING BY PAUL VERONESE. One of the Series removed from the Walls of the Soranza Palace, and brought to England by M. Vendramini. The Regione Veneto acquired the fragment on the art market in 2002 after being sold three times in the previous hundred years

== Bibliography ==
- Exhibition of Paintings in Fresco, by Paul Veronese. Brought from The Soranza Palace, in the Venetian Territory, Now on View, At The Gallery, Maddox-Street, Hanover-Square, Opposite St. Georges Church. London: Printed by Thomas Pavison, Whitefriars. 1826
- Angelo Miatello, "The Bellona. From Painting by Paul Veronse", Castelfranco Veneto, 2014, pp. 133 (ISBN 978-88-88356-51-8)
- (in Italian) Gisolfi D., “I rapporti di Paolo con l'ambiente artistico veronese negli anni della Soranza”, ibid., p. 94 ss.;
- (in Italian) Gisolfi Pechukas D., “Veronese and his collaborators, at la Soranza”, Artibus et Historiae, 15, 1987, pp. 67–108:
- (in Italian) AA. VV., Veronese, Miti, ritratti, allegorie, Pedrocco F., Opere, Milano, 2005, p. 55 ss.
- (in Italian) AA.VV., La città di Padova, Roma, 1970
- (in Italian) AA.VV., La pittura nel Veneto. Il Cinquecento, tomo secondo, Regione del Veneto, Electa, 1998: - Humfrey P., Venezia 1540-1600
- (in Italian) Elisabetta Saccomanni, Padova 1540-1570; - Giorgio Fossaluzza G., Treviso 1540-1600
- (in Italian) Margaret Binotto, Vicenza 1540-1660; - Sergio Marinelli, Verona 1540-1600
- (in Italian) Antonio Romagnolo, Il Polesine di Rovigo 1540-1600
- (in Italian) Albertolli F., Porte di città e altre fabbriche di M. Sammicheli, Milano, 1815
- (in Italian) Atti della distribuzione de' Premi d'Industria nel giorno 12 Febbraio 1817... con discorso analogo di S.E. il conte di Goess, Venezia 1817, pp. 24–25
- (in Italian) Bordignon Favero G., Castelfranco Veneto e il suo territorio nella storia e nell'arte, Castelfranco Veneto, 1975, vol. I-II
- (in Italian) Bordignon Favero G., I Palazzi Soranzo Novello e Spinelli Guidozzi in Castelfranco Veneto, Castelfranco, 1981
- (in Italian) Bordignon Favero G., Le Opere d'arte e il Tesoro del Duomo di S. Maria e S. Liberale di Castelfranco Veneto, Castelfranco, 1965
- (in Italian) Cecchetto G., La Podesteria di Castelfranco nelle mappe e nei disegni dei secoli XV-XVIII, Castelfranco Veneto, 1994
- (in Italian) Cecchetto G., Castelfranco Veneto.Città di Giorgione. Guida, 2008
- (in Italian) Cerinotti A., Atlante illustrato dei Miti greci e Roma antica, Firenze, 2003
- (in Italian) Chiuppani G., “Gli incisori fratelli Vendramini”, in Bollettino del Museo Civico di Bassano, 6, 1909, pp. 56–70, 108-116
- (in Italian) Cicogna E. A., Delle Inscrizioni Veneziane, Volume 3, Editore Orlandelli, 1830; Pag.19)
- (in Italian) Crico L., Lettere sulle belle arti trevigiane, Treviso, 1883
- (in Italian) Il contadino istruito dal suo parroco, Treviso, 1830
- (in Italian) Davies P. and Hemsoll D., Michele Sanmicheli, Milano, 2004, p. 173
- (in Italian) Hemsoll D., “Le ville di Sanmicheli”, in AA.VV., Michele Sanmicheli, Architettura, linguaggio e cultura artistica nel Cinquecento, CISA 1995, p. 92 ss.
- (in Italian) Lodi S., Napione E., “Per Paolo spezapreda”, ibid., p. 86 ss.
- (in Italian) Malvestio C. Miatello A., L'Egitto visto dai Veneti. Il nuovo corso del dopo Mubarak, Castelfranco, 2011
- (in Italian) Sparisi G., Miatello A., Malvestio C., L'Orto Botanico di Padova, Castelfranco V.to, 2012
- (in Italian) Spiazzi A. M., “Un affresco di Paolo Veronese dalla Soranza”, in Arte Veneta, n. 60, 2003, p. 228-233
- (in Italian) Squizzato L., “Nuove documentazioni intorno alla Soranza”, p. 13-20, in Dal Pozzolo E. M., Cecchetto G. (ed.s), Veronese nelle terre di Giorgione, Venezia, 2014
- (in Italian) Cecchetto G., “La Soranza storia di una vita”, 2014, p. 21 ss.
- (in Italian) Stocco, “Il Castello di Treville…”, Ateneo Veneto, 1910, p. 256-8
- (in Italian) Pignatti P., Da Tiziano a El Greco. Per la storia del Manierismo a Venezia, 1981, catalogo della mostra, Milano, 1981, pp. 181–183
- (in Italian) Trevisan F., Omaggio di riconoscenza al nobile signore Filippo Balbi per alcune pitture a fresco di Paolo Caliari trasportate dai muri in tela e donate alla chiesa di San Liberale. Alvisopoli, 1819
- (in Italian) Vasari G., Le vite de' più eccellenti Pittori, Scultori ed Architetti, 1568, ed. 1943, vol. III, pp. 125–126, 359, 369
- (in Italian) Vasari G., Le vite dei più eccellenti pittori, scultori e architetti (Vita di Michele Sanmicheli), Firenze, 1568
- (in Italian) Vignola F.N., “Appunti sulla Pinacoteca Vicentina. Un affresco della Villa Soranza”, in Bollettino del Museo Civico di Vicenza, 1, 1910, fasc. 2, pp. Il-18; * (in Italian) Zamperini A., Veronese, Milano, 2013
- (in Italian) Zorzi A., La vita quotidiana a Venezia nel secolo del Tiziano, Milano, 1994
- (in Italian) Zorzi A., Una città, una Repubblica un Impero, Milano, 1994.
