= Palazzo Corner Spinelli =

Palace in Venice, Italy

Coordinates: 45°26′08″N 12°19′50″E

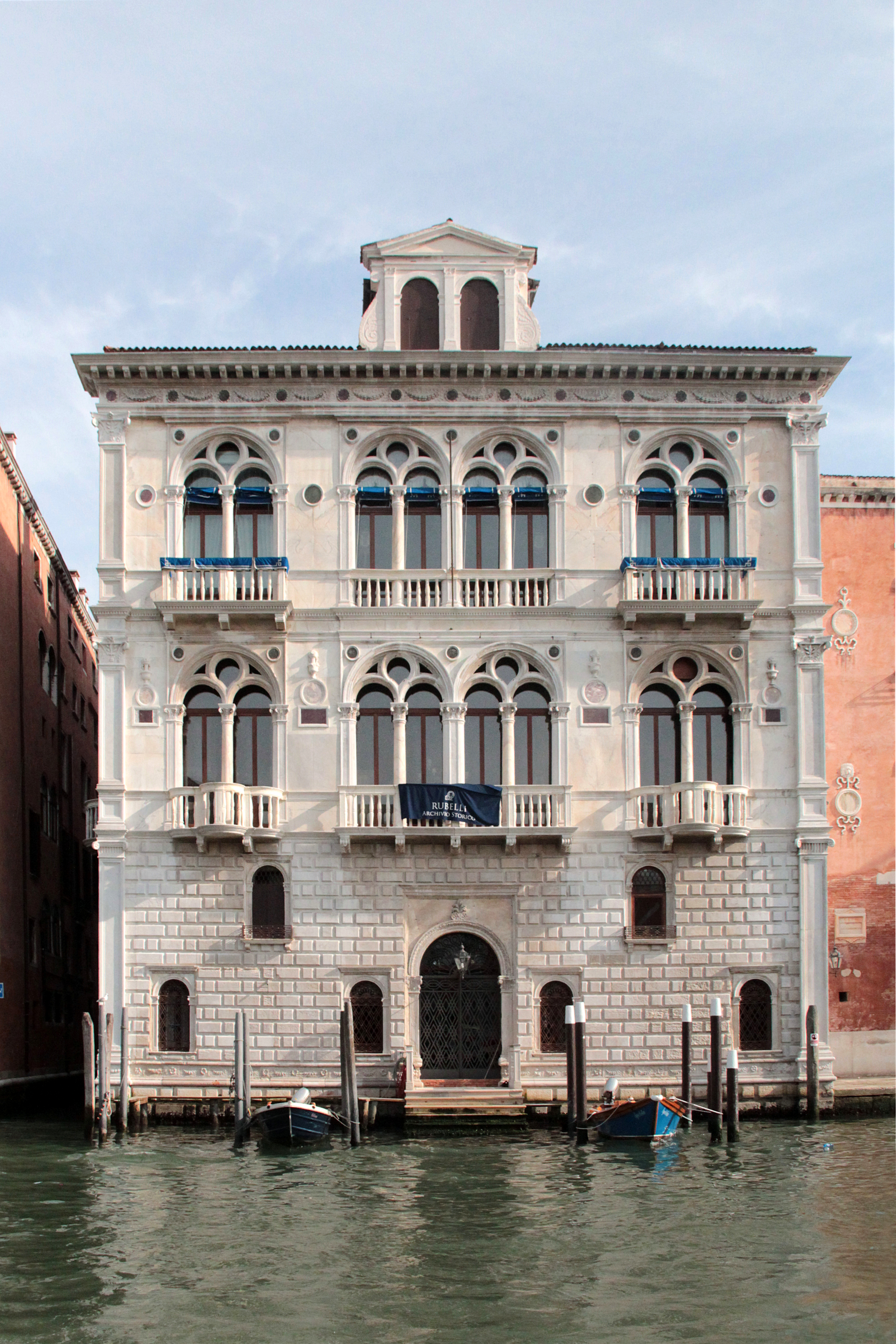
Palazzo Corner Spinelli

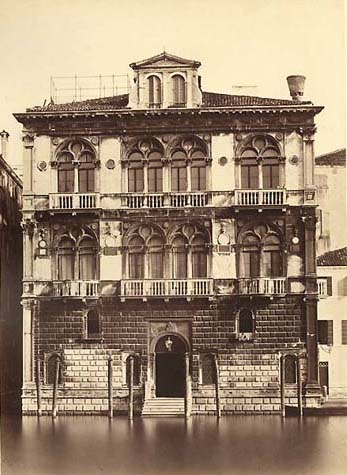
Palazzo Corner Spinelli in a 19th-century photo

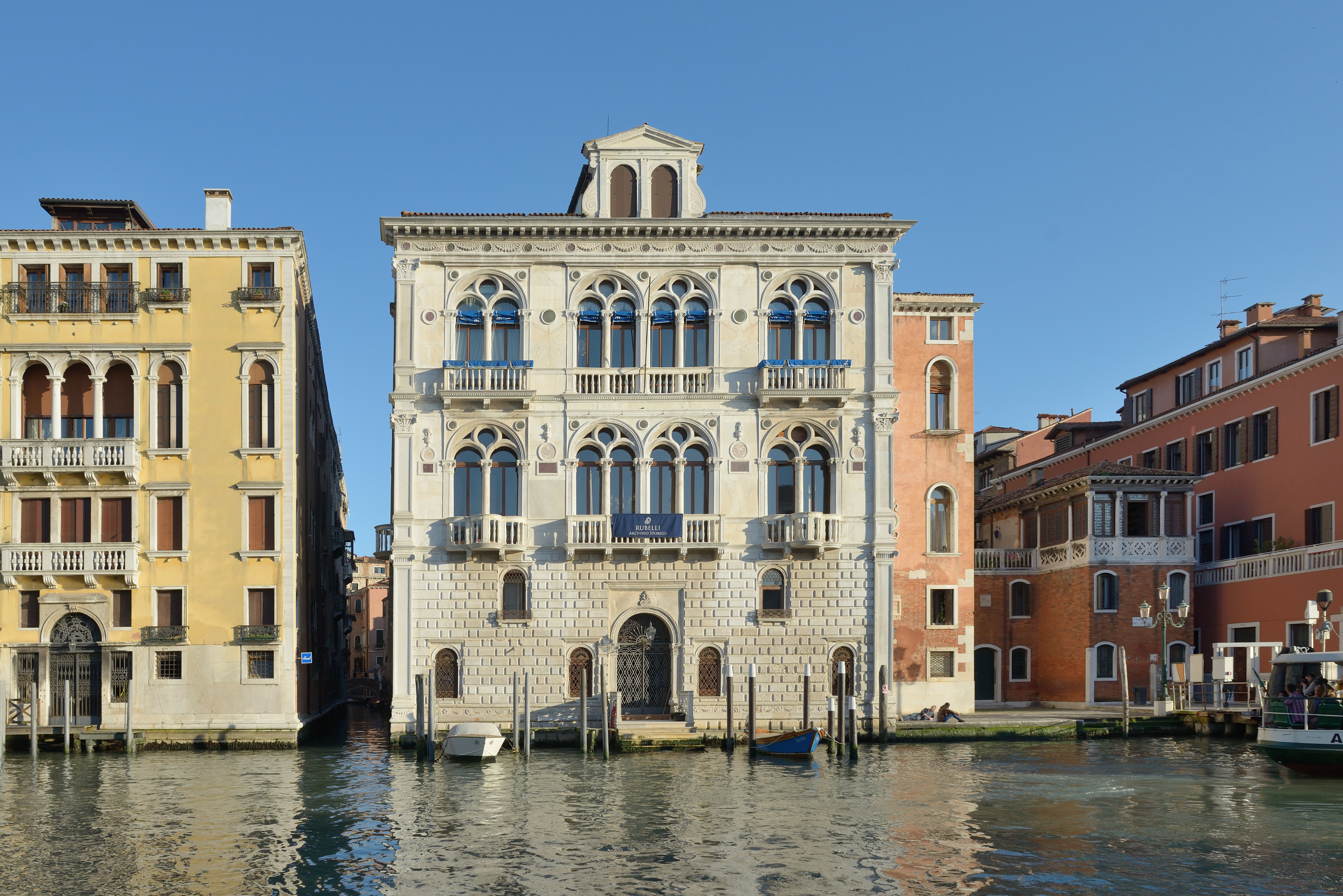
Palazzo today

The Palazzo Corner Spinelli is a palace in Venice, northern Italy, located on the Grand Canal, in the sestiere of San Marco. It stands across the canal from the Palazzo Querini Dubois.

The palace was commissioned in the late 15th century by the aristocratic Lando Family, and built on designs by Mauro Codussi. The present facade, helps introduce Renaissance geometric style to Venice for its day, was designed by Codussi between 1497 and 1500; compare it with Codussi's Ca' Vendramin Calergi. In the 16th century, the new owners, the Corner family asked Michele Sanmicheli to reconstruct the interior. An interior fireplace was designed by Jacopo Sansovino.

== See also ==
- Palazzo Corner
- Palazzo Corner Valmarana

== Sources ==
- Guida d'Italia – Venezia. Milan: Touring Editore. 2007. ISBN 978-88-365-4347-2.
- Davies, Paul; Hemsoll, David (2004). Michele Sanmicheli. Milan: Electa.
