= Kasserine =

Kasserine ڨصرين
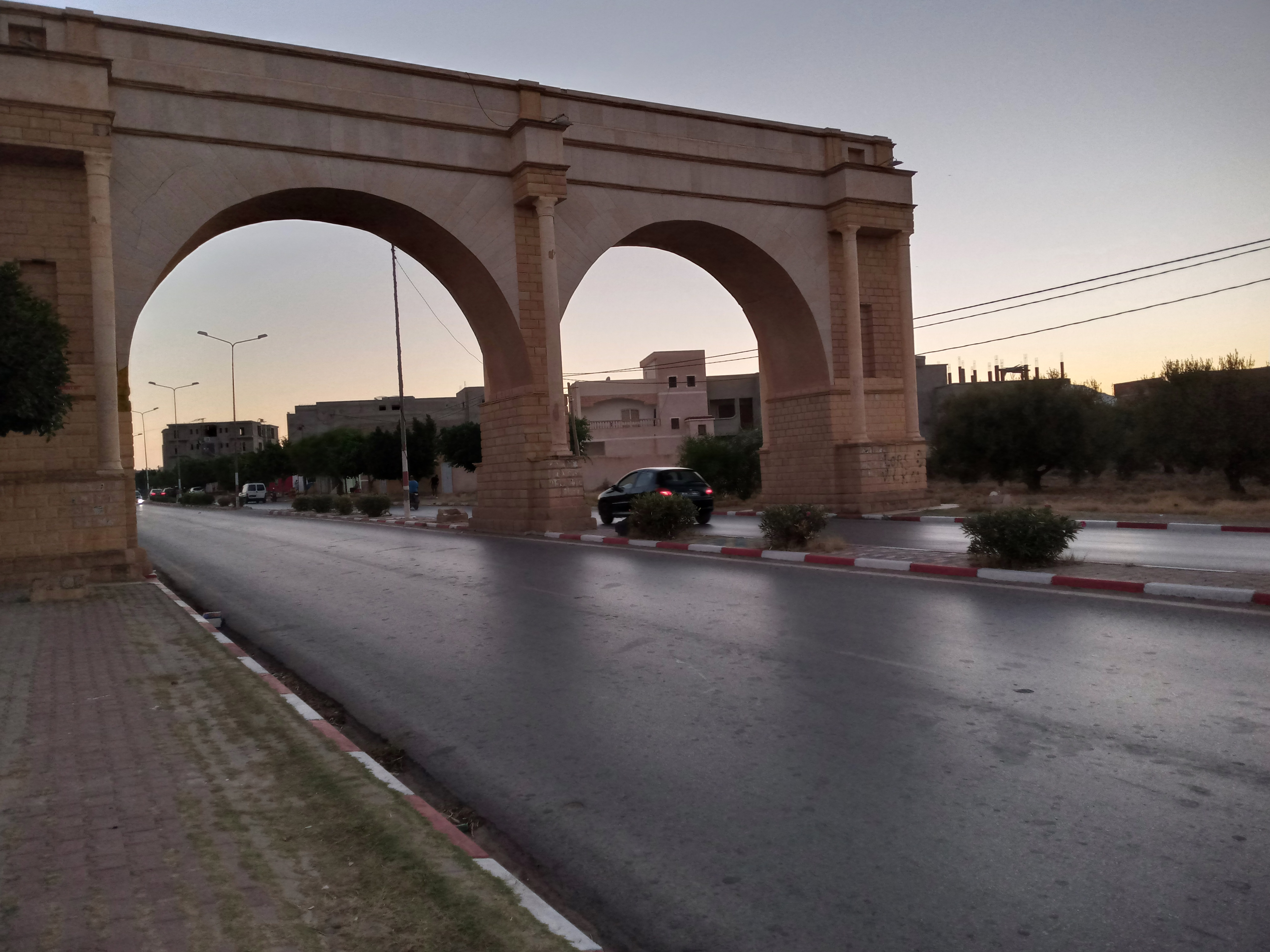
- Arcade of Kasserine

- Location in Tunisia
- Coordinates: 35°10′N 8°50′E
- Country: Tunisia
- Governorate: Kasserine Governorate
- Delegation(s): Kasserine North, Kasserine South, Ezzouhour

Government
  - Mayor: Mohamed Kamel Hamzaoui (Nidaa Tounes)
- Elevation: 2,152 ft (656 m)

Population (2022)
  - Total: 116.330
- Time zone: UTC1 (CET)
- Postal code: 1253

Kasserine (Arabic: القصرين, romanized: al-Qasrīn, Tunisian Arabic: ڨصرين Gaṣrīn) is the capital city of the Kasserine Governorate, in west-central Tunisia. It is situated below Jebel ech Chambi, Tunisia's highest mountain. Its population is 114,463 (2020).

== History ==
In classical antiquity Kasserine was a Roman colony, known as Cillium. Under Roman Emperor Vespasian (69–79) or Titus (79–81), it was elevated to the rank of municipium, and under the Severan dynasty (193–235) to that of colonia (Cillilana). It became Roman territory following the defeat of Carthage in 146 BC, belonging to the provinces of Africa, Africa Vetus, Africa Proconsularus, and finally Africa Byzacena following the reforms of Diocletian in 314 AD.

Archaeological evidence remains on site: mausoleums, triumphal arches, thermae, a theatre and a Christian basilica.

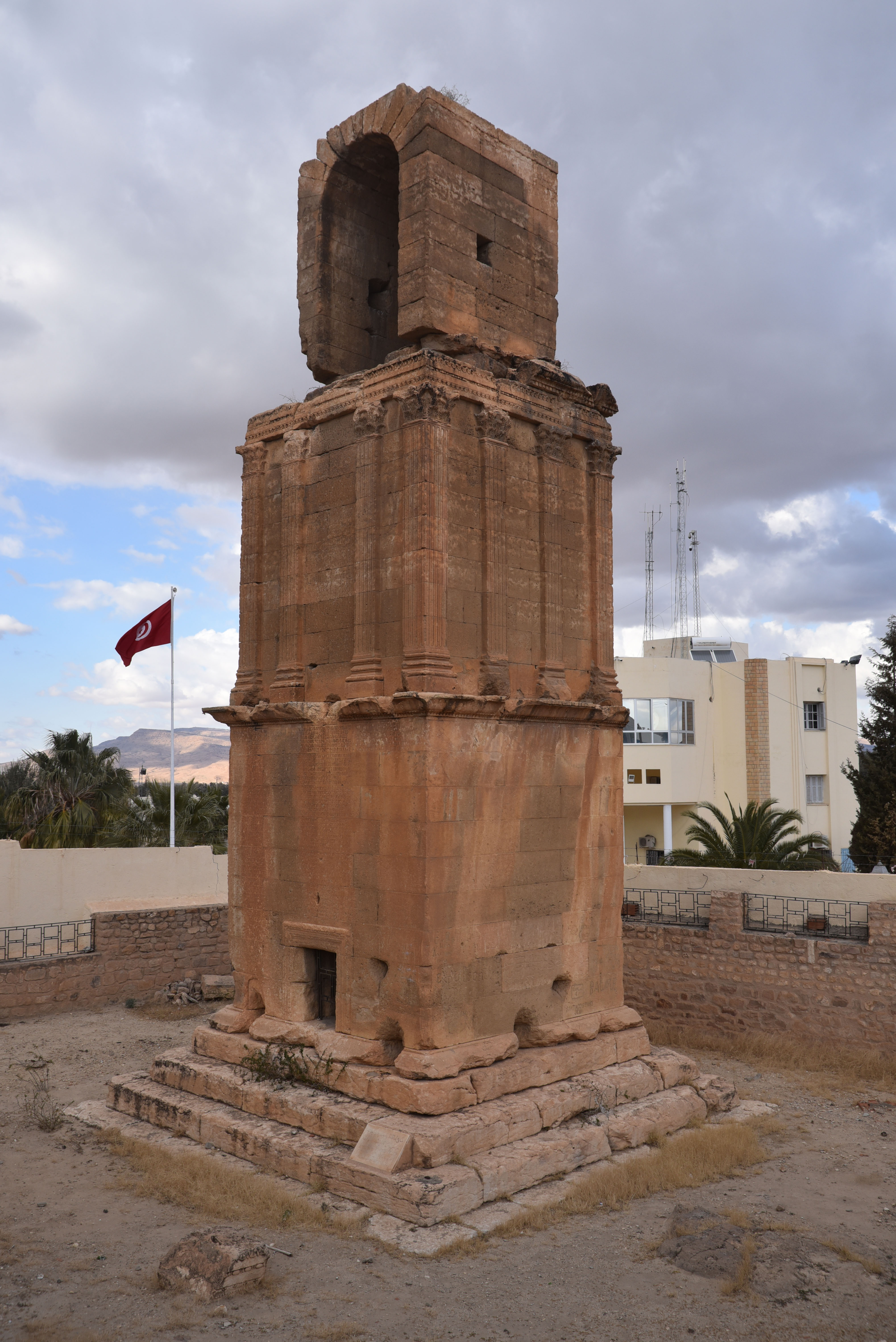
Tomb of the Flavii

One noted monument is the Tomb of the Flavii, built for local landowner Titus Flavius Secundus in the late second century AD. The Tomb contains a 110-line poem memorializing Flavius, and is the "longest extant Latin funerary epitaph from antiquity."

The theater was built at the end of the first century AD, probably to celebrate elevation of the town to a municipium, It was restored, and reopened for performances in 2018.

In 544 the Byzantines were defeated by the Berbers in the Battle of Cillium.

The town was renamed Kasserine, meaning "The Two Palaces", which is a reference to the two Roman mausoleums.

In 1906, an attack by local bedouin on isolated settler farms near Kasserine, and the French civil administration offices during the Thala-Kasserine Disturbances was the first violent resistance to French authority under the protectorate.

During World War II, from January to March 1943, the Germans operated a forced labour camp for Jews in the city. In February 1943, it was the site of the Battle of Kasserine Pass.

== Ecclesiastical history ==
Cillium was important enough in the Roman province of Byzacena to become a suffragan of the Metropolitan of Hadrumetum.

Cillium was represented at the Conference of Carthage (411) between Catholic and Donatist bishops by the Catholic Tertiolus and the Donatist Donatus. In 484, Fortunatianus of Cillium was one of the Catholic bishops whom the Arian Vandal king Huneric summoned to Carthage and then exiled.

=== Titular see of Cillium ===
No longer a residential bishopric, Cillium is today listed by the Catholic Church as a titular see.

Since its nominal restoration in 1925, the Latin titular bishopric has had the following incumbents, both of the lowest (episcopal) rank:

- Boleslavs Sloskāns (1926.05.05 – 1981.04.18), Apostolic Administrator of Mohilev (Belarus) (1926.08.13 – 1981.04.18) and Apostolic Administrator of Mi(e)nsk (Belarus) (1926.08.13 – 1981.04.18)
- Louis Anthony DeSimone, (1981.06.27 – 2018.10.05), Auxiliary Bishop emeritus of Philadelphia

== Geography ==
Kasserine is located in western central Tunisia. By road it is 200 kilometres west of Sfax, 246 kilometres (180 mi) south-west of the capital Tunis, and 166 kilometres (141 mi) south-west of Sousse.

Kasserine is divided into 11 districts:

- El Arich
- Ennour District
- Essalem District
- Ezzouhour District
- El Bassatine District
- El Fath District
- El Karma District
- El Khadhra District
- El Manar District
- Olympic District
- Zouhour District

== Climate ==
Climate data for Kasserine (1991–2020, extremes 1950–2017)
| Month | Jan | Feb | Mar | Apr | May | Jun | Jul | Aug | Sep | Oct | Nov | Dec | Year |
|---|---|---|---|---|---|---|---|---|---|---|---|---|---|
| Record high °C (°F) | 25.2 (77.4) | 31.5 (88.7) | 33.0 (91.4) | 34.7 (94.5) | 41.7 (107.1) | 43.4 (110.1) | 43.6 (110.5) | 42.5 (108.5) | 40.3 (104.5) | 36.0 (96.8) | 31.6 (88.9) | 26.5 (79.7) | 43.6 (110.5) |
| Mean daily maximum °C (°F) | 13.8 (56.8) | 14.9 (58.8) | 18.5 (65.3) | 22.0 (71.6) | 27.0 (80.6) | 32.2 (90.0) | 36.1 (97.0) | 35.2 (95.4) | 29.9 (85.8) | 25.1 (77.2) | 18.8 (65.8) | 14.8 (58.6) | 24.0 (75.2) |
| Daily mean °C (°F) | 8.4 (47.1) | 9.2 (48.6) | 12.2 (54.0) | 15.4 (59.7) | 19.8 (67.6) | 24.4 (75.9) | 27.7 (81.9) | 27.3 (81.1) | 23.3 (73.9) | 18.8 (65.8) | 13.1 (55.6) | 9.5 (49.1) | 17.4 (63.3) |
| Mean daily minimum °C (°F) | 2.9 (37.2) | 3.5 (38.3) | 6.0 (42.8) | 8.8 (47.8) | 12.7 (54.9) | 16.7 (62.1) | 19.4 (66.9) | 19.3 (66.7) | 16.7 (62.1) | 12.5 (54.5) | 7.5 (45.5) | 4.3 (39.7) | 10.9 (51.6) |
| Record low °C (°F) | −7.0 (19.4) | −6.0 (21.2) | −3.0 (26.6) | 0.0 (32.0) | 3.2 (37.8) | 8.0 (46.4) | 10.5 (50.9) | 12.0 (53.6) | 5.8 (42.4) | 0.5 (32.9) | −3.1 (26.4) | −6.5 (20.3) | −7.0 (19.4) |
| Average precipitation mm (inches) | 19.0 (0.75) | 15.8 (0.62) | 21.1 (0.83) | 25.8 (1.02) | 29.2 (1.15) | 19.4 (0.76) | 14.8 (0.58) | 28.0 (1.10) | 38.2 (1.50) | 23.3 (0.92) | 23.7 (0.93) | 13.5 (0.53) | 271.9 (10.70) |
| Average precipitation days (≥ 1.0 mm) | 2.7 | 2.4 | 3.7 | 4.0 | 4.4 | 3.2 | 2.6 | 3.9 | 5.3 | 3.7 | 2.9 | 2.5 | 41.5 |
| Mean monthly sunshine hours | 184.9 | 177.5 | 223.6 | 226.3 | 244.9 | 261.8 | 280.4 | 262.7 | 221.5 | 216.4 | 187.5 | 171.3 | 2,658.8 |
Source 1: Institut National de la Météorologie (extremes 1950-2017, sun 1981-2010) (Note: The Station ID for Kasserine is 64646111.)
Source 2: NOAA

== Sports ==
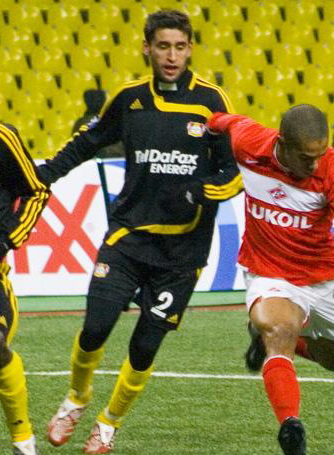
Haggui in action for Bayer Leverkusen in 2007.

Kasserine's most popular sport club is the AS Kasserine (football, soccer).

== Notable people ==
- Faouzia Aloui (born in 1958), a poet and fiction writer.
- Karim Haggui (born January 20, 1984), a football defender

== Sources and external links ==
- GigaCatolic, with titular incumbent biography links

== See also ==
- Battle of the Kasserine Pass
- Kasserine Dam
- History of Roman-era Tunisia
