= Faouzia Aloui =

Tunisian poet and fiction writer

- فوزية العلوي
- Born: 1957 (age 68–69); Kasserine, Tunisia
- Occupations: poet, fiction writer

Faouzia Aloui (Arabic: فوزية العلوي) (born in 1957 in Kasserine) is a Tunisian poet and fiction writer. She is a teacher of Arabic literature in secondary school since 1980.

== Work ==
She is a poet and fiction writer with two collections of poetry and three books of short stories.

=== Poetry ===
- Flying isthme (1997)

=== Books ===
- A Living Corpse (2010)
- Ali and the foal of wind (1995)
- The pigment (1999)
