= Mark Wilson Jones =

Mark Roland Wilson Jones (born 1956) is an architect and architectural historian whose research covers varied aspects of classical architecture while concentrating on that of ancient Greece and Rome. He is best known for his work on the design of monumental buildings, especially the Pantheon, Rome, and that of the Architectural orders in both Roman and Greek contexts. He is the author of two books on classical architecture, and is currently a senior lecturer (associate professor) at the University of Bath.

== Biography ==
Wilson Jones was educated at Queens' College, Cambridge (MA Cantab in architecture, RIBA Part 1) and the Polytechnic of Central London, now the University of Westminster (Diploma in architecture, RIBA Part 2, with distinction). The architecture department at PCL at the time benefited from inspirational young teachers including David Leatherbarrow, Eric Parry, Demetri Porphyrios and Robert Tavernor. Wilson Jones moved to Rome to take up tenure of the Rome Prize (the British Prix de Rome) in Architecture at the British School at Rome (1982–1984), with a project on the masterpiece of Baldassarre Peruzzi, Palazzo Massimo alle Colonne, and it was the process of understanding Peruzzi’s ideas about ancient design that led Wilson Jones to study ancient Roman practice in its own right. To further this research he was awarded a research contract with the Soprintendenza Archeologica di Roma (1984-5) at the instigation of the archeologist Lucos Cozza.

While working as an architect for practices including Shepheard, Epstein and Hunter in London and Bruges Tozer in Bristol, Wilson Jones published several articles on his discoveries about the Pantheon, Rome, Palazzo Massimo alle Colonne, the Tempietto and the Corinthian order. Having won research grants from the British Academy and the Leverhulme Trust he moved back to Rome in 1991, where he combined research with private practice and teaching at the University of Rome La Sapienza and at American universities with programmes in Rome, along with fellowships in the United States. In 2000 he moved to the Department of Architecture and Civil Engineering, University of Bath, where he has served as Director of CASA, and Director of Postgraduate Research. His research has received funding from bodies including the AHRC and he held a research fellowship at the Canadian Centre for Architecture in 2007.

Wilson Jones is a registered architect. His professional practice and archaeological interests have sometimes intersected, as in the commission for a shelter at the site of Cosa north of Rome, and, also on the initiative of Elizabeth Fentress, a masterplan for the site of Volubilis in Morocco for the World Monuments Fund (2001-2003). He has been member of the Architecture and Planning Committee of the Bath Preservation Trust since 2001, and a Trustee. He has served on the Faculty of Archaeology, History and Letters of the British School at Rome from 2006 to 2011, and in 2010 was elected corresponding member of the American Institute of Archaeology.

He is married to Donatella Caramia, professor of neurology at the University of Rome.

== Research ==
While the scholarly environment of much of Wilson Jones’s research is archaeological, it is characterized by an architectural approach. He is drawn to major unresolved issues, especially if much debated ever since the Renaissance, or even antiquity. His discoveries invite paradigm shifts with respect to the scholarly consensus. A case in point is his demonstration that the Romans designed the Corinthian order of columns not according to ratios based on the lower column diameter, as stipulated by Vitruvius and his Renaissance followers. This had been argued by Claude Perrault in 1683, but he and subsequent authorities mistakenly held Roman design to be merely empirical. Wilson Jones proved, however, that while yet compatible with almost endless variation the Romans did in fact employ a system of simple arithmetical ratios (e.g. 1:1,1:2 and 6:5) to design and produce Corinthian columns. His synthetic vision of Roman design appeared as Principles of Roman Architecture (Yale University Press, 2000), the only book to have been awarded both the Banister Fletcher Prize by the RIBA together with the Authors’ Club of Great Britain and the Alice Davis Hitchcock Medallion by the Society of Architectural Historians of Great Britain.

An abiding subject of study and controversy has been the Pantheon, Rome, which despite being one of the most famous icons of architectural history is arguably a flawed masterpiece. The theory of a compromised design, first published in 1987 together with Paul Davies and David Hemsoll, was further developed in the final pair of chapters in Principles of Roman Architecture. Although widely embraced, the ‘compromise hypothesis’ has been contested by Lothar Haselberger, a fellow authority on ancient design. Wilson Jones has published further corroboration in the volume of essays, The Pantheon from Antiquity to the Present (Cambridge University Press, 2015). Two decades of research into the nature of the orders and the Greek temple and the orders have culminated in the book Origins of Classical Architecture: temples, orders and gifts to the gods in ancient Greece (Yale University Press, 2014). He currently works with the University of Bath.

== Selected publications ==
- "The Pantheon: a triumph of Rome or a triumph of compromise?" (with Paul Davies & David Hemsoll), Art History 10, 1987, 133-153.
- "Palazzo Massimo and Baldassare Peruzzi's approach to architectural design", Architectural History 31, 1988, 59-85.
- Principles of Roman Architecture, Yale University Press (2000); ISBN 0-300-08138-3. Softback editions: 2003 and 2009.
- Origins of Classical Architecture: temples, orders and gifts to the gods in ancient Greece, Yale University Press (2014). ISBN 978-0-300-18276-7.
- ‘Greek and Roman Architectural Theory’, in The Oxford Handbook of Greek and Roman Art and Architecture, ed. Clemente Marconi (Oxford and New York 2015). Oxford University Press: 41-69.
- The Pantheon in Rome from Antiquity to the Present, co-edited with Tod Marder, Cambridge University Press (2015).
