= Kasserine Dam =

Former dam in Kasserine, Tunisia

Coordinates: 35.1658°N 8.8006°E

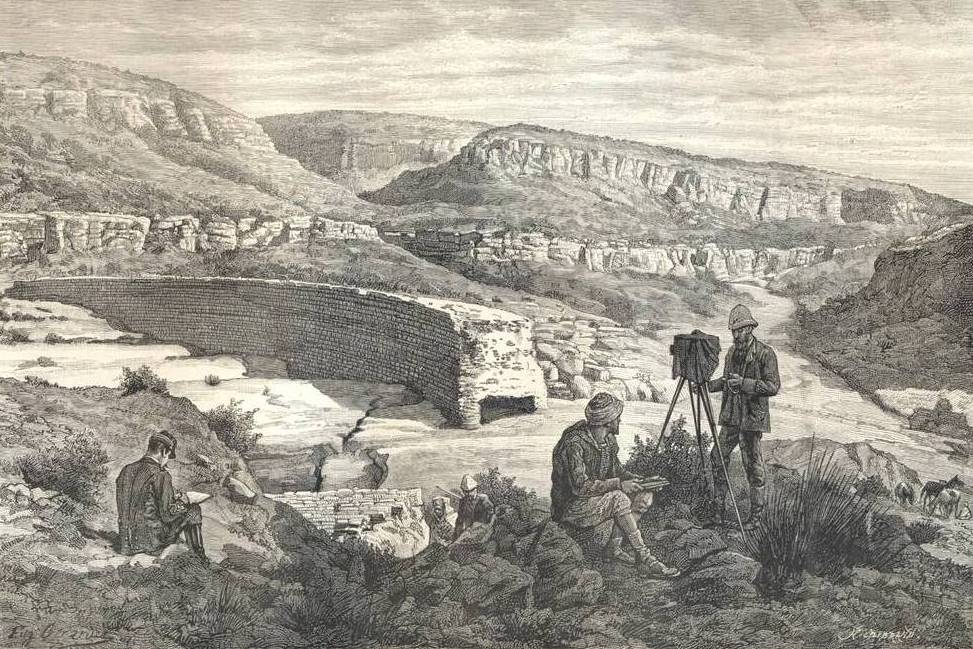
- Kasserine Dam in the 1880s, by Eugène Girardet

- Location within Tunisia
- Interactive map of Kasserine Dam
- Location: Kasserine, Kasserine Governorate, Tunisia
- Opening date: 2nd century

Dam and spillways
- Height: 10 m (33 ft)
- Length: 150 m (490 ft)
- Width (base): 7.3 m (24 ft)

The Kasserine Dam was a Roman dam at Kasserine (ancient Cillium), Tunisia. The curved structure which dates to the 2nd century AD is variously classified as arch-gravity dam or gravity dam.

The dam consisted of a core of earth and rubble faced with mortared blocks of cut stone. The upstream face is vertical, while the downstream side steps down through six courses and then continues vertically for 3.8 m. The thickness at the crest is 4.9 m, and at the base 7.3 m.

== See also ==
- List of Roman dams and reservoirs
- Roman architecture
- Roman engineering
