= David Hemsoll =

British art and architectural historian

David Edward Hemsoll FSA (born March 1954) is a British art and architectural historian, specialising in Renaissance art and architecture, especially that of Rome, Florence, and Venice. He has published numerous catalogue essays and books that address architectural theory and the methodology of architectural design. He is currently (2020) Senior Lecturer in the Department of Art History, Curating and Visual Studies at the University of Birmingham.

== Education and academic service ==
Hemsoll received his BA from the University of East Anglia before completing his MA at the Courtauld Institute of Art, and finally receiving his PhD from the University of Birmingham.

In 1990, when the Department of the Art History was re-founded at the University of Birmingham, Hemsoll was appointed Lecturer; he was department head between 2002 and 2010.

He has been a Fellow of the Society of Antiquaries of London since 2014. From 2015 to 2017, he was the director of the Society of Architectural Historians of Great Britain. In 2017, he received a research fellowship from the Leverhulme Trust for his research project Emulating antiquity: Renaissance buildings from Brunelleschi to Michelangelo, published in 2019.

Hemsoll is currently the Deputy Editor of the peer-reviewed journal Architectural History in addition to his appointment as a visiting professor at I Tatti, the Harvard University Center for Italian Renaissance Studies.

== Academic work ==
Hemsoll is a specialist in classical and Renaissance architecture.

His 1987 article with Paul Godfrey influentially proposed observations of the design of the Pantheon that questioned whether it had been used as a temple. With Paul Davies and Mark Wilson Jones, Hemsoll suggests that the Pantheon "was intended to have a taller portico with a gabled roof" when first designed.

His 2019 work Emulating Antiquity considers how designers and architects of the Italian Renaissance gave new meaning to their Classical influences. The book reconsiders the influential work of sixteenth-century writer Giorgio Vasari, who, as Deborah Howard writes in her review of Hemsoll's work, "has long provided a lucid, (perhaps too) convenient structure for general histories of Renaissance architecture and for teaching the subject to students. In this book Hemsoll offers a personal critical reassessment of Vasari's legacy". Hemsoll analyses work by architects including Filippo Brunelleschi, Donato Bramante, Michelozzo, Leon Battista Alberti, and Michelangelo, to propose that rather than straightforwardly recreating Classical forms in their designs, each architect responded to and developed new architectural ideas that accounted for political and ecclesiastical tastes, and the demands of patrons, and thus that they reinvented rather than copied antique models.

Hemsoll provided the introduction to the 2018 J. Paul Getty Museum edition of Georgio Vasari's sixteenth-century The Life of Michelangelo.

== Publications ==
=== Books ===
- D. Hemsoll. Emulating antiquity : renaissance buildings from Brunelleschi to Michelangelo. New Haven: Yale University Press, 2019. Emulating Antiquity was shortlisted for the Alice Davis Hitchcock Medallion in 2020, and Hemsoll was interviewed by the president of the Society of Architectural Historians of Great Britain, Neil Jackson, on the event of his nomination.
- D. Hemsoll with P. Davies. Renaissance Architecture and Ornament; The Paper Museum of Cassiano dal Pozzo, ser. A, n. 10. Royal Collection with Harvey Miller: London, 2013.
- D. Hemsoll with P. Davies, Michele Sanmicheli. Electa: Milan, 2004.

=== Select journal articles and contributions to edited volumes ===
- D. Hemsoll. ‘Palladio’s architectural orders, from practice to theory.’ Architectural History 58 (2015), 1-54.
- D. Hemsoll. ‘Michelangelo’s St Peter’s and a neglected early drawing.’ In Artistic Practices and Cultural Transfer in Early Modern Italy; Essays in Honour of Deborah Howard, edited by N. Avcioğlu and A. Sherman. Ashgate: Farnham, 2015.
- D. Hemsoll. ‘Consonance, incoherence and obscurity: rhetorical idealism in the centrally-planned church schemes of Sebastiano Serlio.’ In The Gordian Knot, Studi offerti a Richard Schofield, edited by M. Basso, et al. Campisano Editore: Rome, 2014.
- D. Hemsoll. ‘Imitation as a creative vehicle in Michelangelo’s art and architecture.' In Architecture and Interpretation: Essays for Eric Fernie, edited by in J.A. Franklin, R.A. Heslop and C. Stevenson. Boydell Press: Woodbridge, 2012.
- D. Hemsoll. ‘The conception and design of Michelangelo’s Sistine Chapel ceiling: “wishing just to shed a little upon the whole rather than mentioning the parts.”’ In Rethinking the High Renaissance: the Culture of the Visual Arts in Early Sixteenth-Century Rome, edited by J. Burke. Ashgate: Farnham, 2012.
- D. Hemsoll. ‘Raphael’s new architectural agenda.' In Imitation, Representation and Printing in the Italian Renaissance (Early Modern and Modern Studies, vol. 3), edited by R. Eriksen and M. Malmanger. Fabrizio Serra Editore: Pisa-Roma, 2009.
- D. Hemsoll. ‘The Laurentian Library and Michelangelo’s architectural method’, Journal of the Warburg and Courtauld Institutes 66 (2003), 29-62
- D. Hemsoll. ‘A question of language: Raphael, Michelangelo and the art of architectural imitation.' In Raising the Eyebrow: John Onians and World Art Studies, an album amicorum in his honour, BAR International Series 996, edited by L. Golden. Archeopress: Oxford, 2001.
- D. Hemsoll. ‘Simone Martini’s St John the Evangelist re-examined: a panel from an early portable triptych.' Apollo 147 (1998), 3-10.
- D. Hemsoll. ‘Beauty as an aesthetic and artistic ideal in late fifteenth-century Florence.’ In Concepts of Beauty in Renaissance Art, edited by F. Ames-Lewis and M. Rogers. Ashgate: Aldershot, 1998.
- D. Hemsoll with P. Davies. ‘Sanmicheli through British Eyes.' In English Architecture Public and Private, edited by J. Bold and E. Chaney. Hambledon Press: London, 1993.
- D. Hemsoll. ‘The Architecture of Nero’s Golden House.' In Architecture and Architectural Sculpture in the Roman Empire, edited by M. Henig. Oxford University Committee for Archaeology (Monograph 29): Oxford, 1990.
- D. Hemsoll. ‘Reconstructing the octagonal dining room of Nero’s Golden House.' Architectural History 32 (1989), 1-17.
- D. Hemsoll with Paul Godfrey, 'The Pantheon: temple or rotunda?', in Pagan Gods and Shrines of the Roman Empire, edited by Martin Henig, Oxford, 1986.
- D. Hemsoll with P. Davies and M. Wilson Jones. ‘The Pantheon: triumph of Rome or triumph of compromise?’ Art History 10 (1987), 133-53.
- D. Hemsoll with P. Davies. ‘Renaissance balusters and the Antique.' Architectural History 26 (1983), 1-23.

=== Photography ===
Photographs contributed by David Hemsoll to the Conway Library are currently being digitised by the Courtauld Institute of Art, as part of the Courtauld Connects project.
