= Paul Davies (art historian) =

British art historian

Paul Davies (born October 1955) is professor of the history of art at the University of Reading. Davies is a specialist in the architecture of Italy 1350–1650, centrally planned churches and the architectural response to miracles, architecture in Venice and the Veneto, and Italian Renaissance architectural drawings.

== Selected publications ==
- Michele Sanmicheli. Electa, 2004. (with David Hemsoll)
- The Paper Museum of Cassiano Dal Pozzo. A.X. Renaissance and later architecture and ornament. Royal Collection, 2013.
- Architecture and Pilgrimage 1000-1500: the Southern Mediterranean and Beyond. Ashgate Publishing, 2013. (editor with D. Howard and W. Pullan)
