= List of Roman bridges =

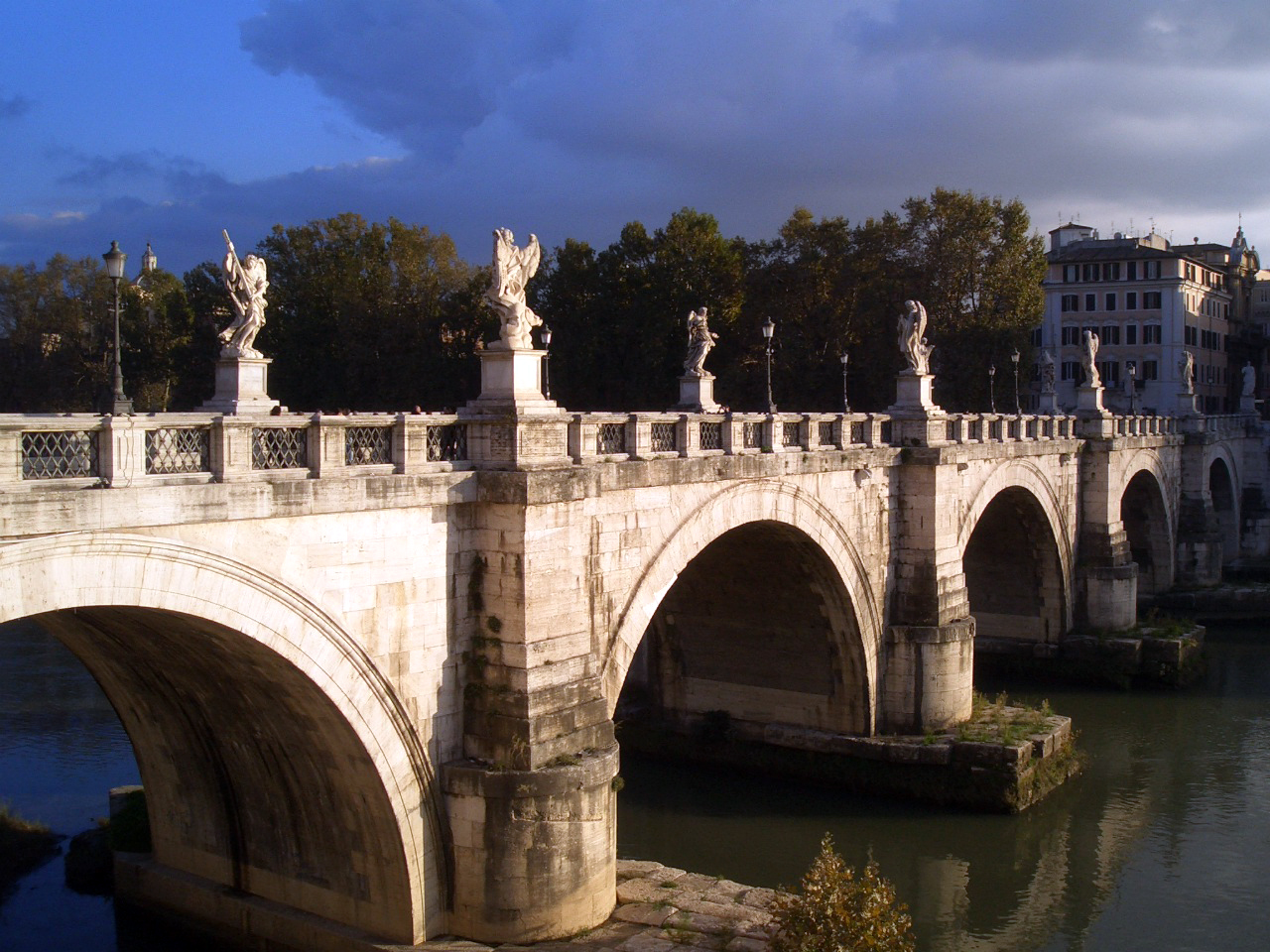
Ponte Sant'Angelo in Rome, Italy

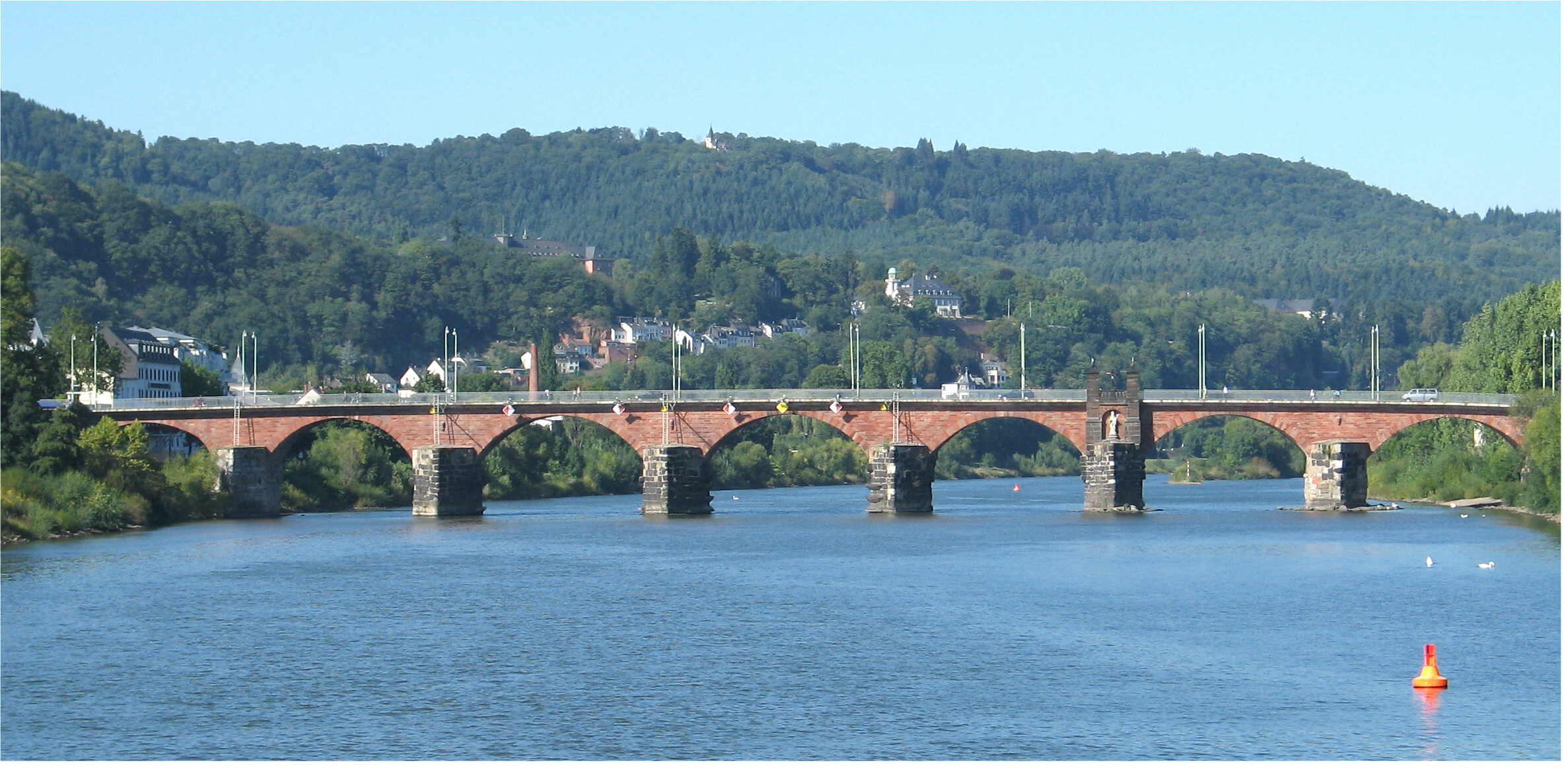
Roman stone pillar bridge in Trier, Germany. The arches were added in the 14th century.

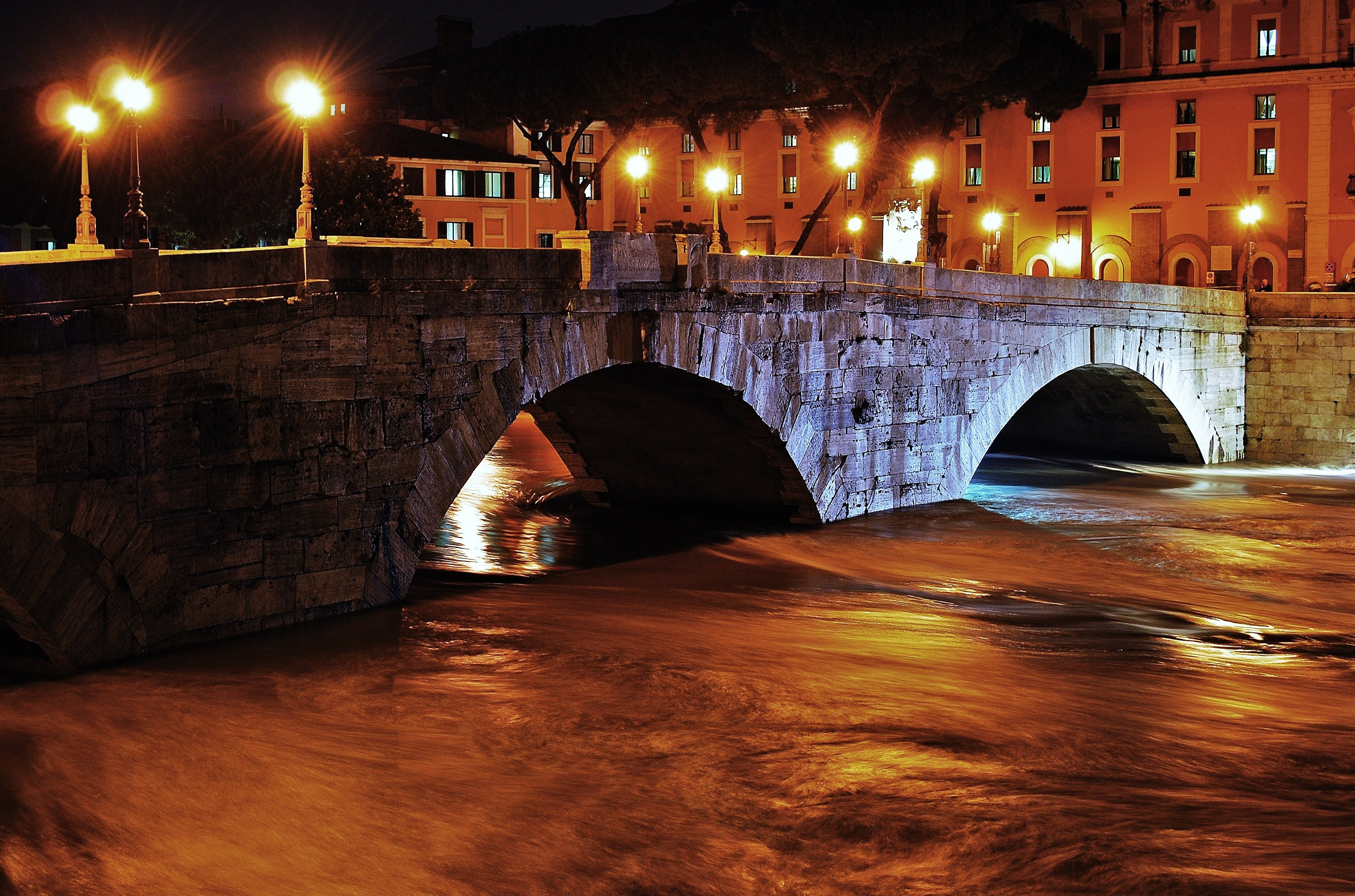
Pons Cestius, Rome, during a flood

This is a list of Roman bridges. The Romans were the world's first major bridge builders. The following constitutes an attempt to list all known surviving remains of Roman bridges.

A Roman bridge in the sense of this article includes any of these features:

- Roman arches
- Roman pillars
- Roman foundations
- Roman abutments
- Roman roadway
- Roman cutwaters

Also listed are bridges which feature substantially Roman material (spolia), as long as the later bridge is erected on the site of a Roman precursor. Finally, incidences where only inscriptions lay testimony to a former Roman bridge are also included.

In the following, bridges are classified either according to their material or their function. Most data not otherwise marked come from O'Connor's Roman Bridges, which lists 330 stone bridges for traffic, 34 timber bridges and 54 aqueduct bridges. An even larger compilation of more than 900 Roman bridges (as of 2011) is offered by the Italian scholar Galliazzo, who is used here only selectively.

Note: the table columns are sortable by clicking the header, e.g. for country of origin, etc.

== Note on classification ==
Bridges are particularly difficult to classify as they, more than other structures, are subject to wear, on account of war and the impact of natural elements. The constant need for repairs through the ages has often turned bridges into hybrid structures, making it often difficult or nearly impossible to determine the exact date and origin of individual parts of a bridge. Thus, the majority of bridges listed below can be assumed to include medieval or (early) modern modifications, replacements or extensions, to a small or large extent.

== Masonry road bridges ==
The following table lists road bridges made out of stone or brick. The vast majority features arches, although stone deck slabs were also known. Bridges' spans and height abbreviations: S = small, M = middle, L = large.

Image	Name	River	Town	Location	Country	Spans	Height	Comment
Aesepus Bridge around 1905/06	Aesepus Bridge	Gönen Çayı (Aesepus)	Cyzicus	3.5 mi above mouth	Turkey	11 × S-M	?	
	Ain Diwar Bridge	formerly crossed the Tigris	Ain Diwar	3.5 km NE of Ain Diwar	Syria	?		In ruins, one span remaining.
	Albarregas bridge	Albarregas	Mérida	NW entrance to town	Spain	1.3 m; 1.7 m; 3 × 5 m	S	
Alcántara Bridge	Alcántara Bridge	Tagus	Alcántara	?	Spain	13.8 m; 21.9 m; 28.8 m; 27.4 m; 21.9 m; 13.8 m	L	
Span no. 3	Alconétar Bridge	Tagus	Alconétar	Now 6 km N	Spain	16 × 7.3–15 m	M	Segmental arch bridge
Alte Sauerbrücke viewed from Echternach bank	Alte Sauerbrücke	Sauer	Echternach	Eastern edge of the town	Luxembourg/ Germany	?	?	Roman origin unclear
		Antalya		8 km east of Antalya	Turkey		?	
		Aperlae			Turkey		?	
Arapsu Bridge	Arapsu Bridge	Arapsu	Olbia	Antalya-Arapsuyu	Turkey	1 × S	S	
		Kemer		10 km west of Kemer	Turkey			
	Asi bridge	?	Antakya	?	Turkey	4 × 10 m	S	
Roman bridge of Ávila	Ávila Bridge	Adaja	Ávila	?	Spain	?	M	?
Band-e Kaisar	Band-e Kaisar	Karun	Shushtar	?	Iran	c. 40 × M	M	Easternmost Roman bridge
Bridge at Afrin	Bridge at Afrin	Afrin	Aleppo	1 km E of Cyrrhus	Syria	11.5 m; 12.5 m; 12 m	M	
4th arch south side	Bridge at Limyra	Alakır Çayı	Limyra	7.5 km NE of Finike	Turkey	27 × c. 10.65 m	S	Segmental arch bridge
	Bridge at Maameltein	Maameltein	Beirut	18 km NE	Lebanon	12 m	S	
	Bridge at Nimreh	Wadi al-Liwa	Shahba	10 km SE from Shahba	Syria	6.73 m	S	Transversal arch
	Bridge at Oberzeiring	Blahbach	Oberzeiring	20 km NW of Judenburg	Austria	1 or 2 × S	S	
	Bridge at Oinoanda	Koca Çayı (Xanthos river)	Oinoanda	At foot of town hill	Turkey	?	?	Excavated inscription points at existence
	çakallık Bridge			1 km south of çakallık	Turkey	?	?	
	Jisr Jindas	Nahal Ayalon	Lod	35 km NW of Jerusalem	Israel	?		Only the foundations are of Roman construction
Chesters bridge abutment	Chesters Bridge	North Tyne	Chesters		England	4 × S		Abutment and possible stone arches
	Cibyra bridge		Cibyra		Turkey		?	
	Cinque Ponti	?	Salona	7 km NE of Split	Croatia	2 × S	S	
	Cloaca di Porta San Clementino	Marta	Graviscae	Near Tarquinia on Via Aurelia	Italy, Central	1 × S	S	
	Constantine's Bridge	Adırnas Çayı (Rhyndacus)	Ulubad (Lopadium)		Turkey	?		In ruins. Only a few piers remain on north bank.
	Culverts in Siliana valley	?	Maktar	E	Tunisia	1 × S	S	
	Eleusis Bridge	Eleusis			Greece	?		
The characteristic mid-course displacement (2005)	Eurymedon Bridge	Köprüçay (Eurymedon)	Aspendos	c. 3 km SW	Turkey	5.1 m; ?; ?; 14.95 m; 23.52 m; 14.95 m; ?; ?; ?;	M	
Eurymedon Bridge at Selge in 2009	Eurymedon Bridge	Köprüçay (Eurymedon)	Selge	c. 5 km N of Beşkonak	Turkey	7 m	S	
Gemarrin Bridge, view from southeast in 1995	Gemarrin Bridge	Wadi Zeidi	Gemarrin	N of Bostra	Syria	3 × S	S	
	Göksu bridge	Göksu (Calycadnus)	Samsat	25 km W	Turkey	c. 30 m	?	
	Hadji Bektari bridge	Shkumbi	Hadji Bektari	10 km NE of Elbasan	Albania	3 × S	?	
	Jisr el Majami	Jordan	Gesher	?	Israel, Jordan	c. 15 m; c. 18 m	M	
	Baç or Justinian Bridge (Justinyen Köprüsü)	Berdan River	Tarsus	Near Adana	Turkey	3 × S	S	
	Karamagara Bridge	Arapgir Çayı	Ağın	?	Turkey	17 m	L	Possibly earliest known pointed arch bridge
	Karas bridge	?	Karas	10 km N of Erzerum	Turkey	4-8 × M	S	
Third arch	Kemer Bridge	Koca Çayı (Xanthos river)	Kemer	N of Kalkan	Turkey	4.1 m; 4.5 m; >4.0 m	S	
	Kharaba Bridge	Wadi Zeidi	Bostra	3.5 km NW of Bostra	Syria	3 × 3.8 m	S	
Leontes Bridge, by Félix Bonfils	Leontes Bridge	Leontes	Tyre	10 km N	Lebanon	1 × M	S	Segmental arch bridge
Elevation and plan of the Makestos Bridge	Macestus Bridge	Susurluk Çayı (Roman Macestus)	Balıkesir	Between Susurluk und Sultançayir	Turkey	15 × 14.20 m	S	Segmental arch bridge
Misis Bridge	Misis bridge	Ceyhan	Adana	E of Adana	Turkey	9 × M	S	
	Muro del Peccato	?	Civita Castellana	N of Ponte sul Treia	Italy, Central	?	?	
Inside view of the "tunnel" of the Roman Nysa Bridge, a tunnel-like substructure at Nysa on Meander, Caria, Asia Minor, to the west, downstream; between the arch in the front and in the back is the collapsed ssection	Nysa Bridge	Cakircak	Nysa	In Nysa	Turkey	5.7–7 m	S	2nd largest ancient bridge substructure
RomanBridgeAtPhilippi	Philippi	?	Philippi		Greece	?		paving stones are part of the via Egnatia
Pons Aelius	Pons Aelius	Tiber	Rome	In Rome	Italy, Rome & vicinity	6 × 18	M	
Pons Aemilius	Pons Aemilius	Tiber	Rome	In Rome	Italy, Rome & vicinity	6 spans, incl. 4 × 24.3 m	M	
	Pons Agrippae	Tiber	Rome	In Rome	Italy, Rome & vicinity			
	Pons Auruncus	?	Sessa Aurunca	1 km W	Italy, Southern	21 × M	S	
Pons Cestius	Pons Cestius	Tiber	Rome	In Rome	Italy, Rome & vicinity	3 × 13.7 m	M	
Pons Fabricius	Pons Fabricius	Tiber	Rome	In Rome	Italy, Rome & vicinity	24.2 m; 24.5 m	M	
Remains of Pons Neronianus at low water in the foreground (the standing bridge is the modern Ponte Vittorio Emanuele II)	Pons Neronianus	Tiber	Rome	In Rome	Italy, Rome & vicinity			
	Pons Minucius	Tiber	Otricoli	3 km S on Via Flaminia	Italy, Central	?	?	
Pons Milvius	Pons Milvius	Tiber	Rome	5 km north	Italy, Rome & vicinity	9 m; 4 × 18 m; 9 m	M	
	Pons Probi	Tiber	Rome	In Rome	Italy, Rome & vicinity			Demolished in 1484, footers removed 1874.
	Pons Sangarius	Sakarya (Sangarius)	Candir Köprü	55 km SE of Eskişehir	Turkey	?	?	
	Pons Servili	?	Orakë	W of Lake Ohrid	Albania	?	?	
	Pont de Boissezon	Bénovie	Boissezon	1 km S of Sommières	France	6 m; 8.8 m; 9.4 m; 8.8 m; 6 m	S	
	Pont de César	Velaj	Mondouilloux	On Via Bolena	France	?	?	
	Pont de Chemtou	Mejerda	Chemtou	20 km W of Jendouba	Tunisia	5 × S	M	
	Pont de Civitas Avensis	Mejerda	Bou Salem (Souk el Khemis)	11 km E	Tunisia	2 × S	?	In ruins.
Pont de Domqueur	Pont de Domqueur	?	Domqueur	16 km E of Abbeville	France	2.3 m	S	
	Pont de Duperré	Oued Chelif	Duperré	150 km SW of Algiers	Algeria	?	?	
	Pont de Gastal	?	Tébessa	Possibly 30 km N	Algeria	7.5 m	S	
	Pont de Grich el Oued	Oued el Hamar	Grich el Oued (Roman Thisiduo)	6 km NE of Mejez el Bab	Tunisia	>3 m	S	
	Pont de Jedeida	Mejerda	Jedeida	E end of town	Tunisia	9 × S	S	
	Pont de Khémissa	?	Khémissa	2 km E	Algeria	S; 5.4 m; S	M	
Pont des Marchands	Pont des Marchands	Canal de la Robine	Narbonne		France	1 × c. 15	S	One of the few remaining bridges with shops on it.
	Pont de Mejez el Bab	Mejerda	Mejez el Bab	W end of town	Tunisia	7 × S	S	
	Pont de Montignies-St Christophe	Hantes	Montignies-St Christophe	1 km NW	Belgium	13 × 1.5 m	S	
Pont de Pierre	Pont de Pierre	Buthier	Aosta	E of Arch of Augustus	Italy, Northern	17.1 m	S	Segmental arch bridge
	Pont de Rolampont	Marne	Rolampont	1-1.5 km SE	France	3 × S	S	
	Pont de Sbeitla	Oued Sbeitla	Sbeitla	300 m NE	Tunisia	4 × M	M	
	Pont de Tébessa	?	Tébessa	2.5 km NE	Algeria	4 × 3.1 m	S	
	Pont de Tébourba	Mejerda	Tébourba	SE of town	Tunisia	c. 16 × S	S	
	Pont de Trajan	Oued Béja	Béja	10 km S	Tunisia	5.8 m; 5.3 m; 6 m	S	
	Pont de Treviri	Oued Rhumel	Constantine	?	Algeria	c. 3.5 m; 5.3 m; c. 3.5 m	M	
Pont de Sommières	Pont de Sommières	Vidourle	Sommières	In town	France	2 × S; 13 × 8.5 m; 2 × S	S	
	Pont de St Gabriel	?	Tarascon	?	France	3 m	?	
Pont de St Thibéry	Pont de St Thibéry	Hérault	Saint-Thibéry	1 km SE on Via Domitia	France	9 × 10–12 m	S	Segmental arch bridge
Pont de Vaison-la-Romaine	Pont de Vaison-la-Romaine	Ouvèze	Vaison-la-Romaine	In town	France	17 m	S	
	Pont d'Adpertusa	Oued Chafrou	Adpertusa	5 km W of Tunis	Tunisia	6.3 m	S	
	Pont d'Ain Hedja	?	Agbia	?	Tunisia	?	?	
	Pont d'Ain Younes	Oued el Kebir	Téboursouk	9 km SE	Tunisia	1 × S	S	
Pont Ambroix	Pont Ambroix	Vidourle	Ambrussum	W of Gallargues-le-Montueux on Via Domitia	France	5 × M	?	
	Pont d’Ascain	Nivella	Ascain	7 km SE of Saint-Jean-de-Luz	France	?	?	
	Pont d’el Kantara	Oued Kantara	El Kantara	65 km SW of Batna	Algeria	10 m	M	
	Pont d’Ombret	Semois	Arel	Arel-Trier road	Belgium	?	?	
	Pont d'Oudna	Oued Oudna	Oudna	200 m NE	Tunisia	3 × S	S	
	Pont d'Oued Budjema	Oued Budjema	Annaba	1 km S, at Hippone	Algeria	11 × S	S	
	Pont d'Oued Bou-Zid	Oued Bou-Zid	Ksar Hellal	?	Tunisia	?	?	
	Pont d'Oued Cherchar	Oued Cherchar	Bou Ficha	4 km NE	Tunisia	c. 16 × S	S	
	Pont d'Oued el Ahmar	Oued el Ahmar	Dougga	6.5 km E	Tunisia	?	?	
	Pont d'Oued el Enja	Oued el Enja	Thuburnica	11 km NW of Chemtou	Tunisia or Algeria	10 m	S	
	Pont d'Oued Nebana	Oued Nebana	Kairouan	36 km N	Tunisia	5 m; 6 × 2.6 m; S (now c. 14 spans)	S	
	Pont d'Oued Zarga	Oued Zarga	Oued Zarga	?	Tunisia	2 × M	S	
	Pont d'Oued Ziuna	Oued Ziuna	Tolemaide (Addirsiyah)	?	Libya	2 × S	S	
	Pont d'Outremécourt	Mouzon	Outremécourt	?	France	3 m; 4.7 m; 5.8 m; 4.7 m; 3 m	S	
Puente del Diablo	Pont del Diable	Llobregat	Martorell	E end of town	Spain	c. 16 m; 37.3 m	L	current span not roman
	Pont des Esclapes	Le Béal	Fréjus	2.5 km W on Via Julia Augusta	France	3 × S	S	
	logis des Cantonniers		Fréjus	on Via Julia Augusta	France		S	
The single-arched bridge framed by two triumphal arches	Pont Flavien	Touloubre	Saint-Chamas	E of Arles on Via Julia Augusta	France	12.3 m	S	
Pont Julien	Pont Julien	Calavon	Apt	7 km W	France	10.3 m; 16.3 m; 10.3 m	S	
Pont Romà	Pont Romà	Torrent de Sant Jordi	Pollença	At outskirts	Spain	2 × S	S	One semi-circular, one segmental arch
	Pont Serme	?	Béziers	14 km W on Via Domitia	France	?	S	
Pont Saint-Martin	Pont Saint-Martin	Lys	Pont-Saint-Martin	In town	Italy, Northern	31.4 m	M	Segmental arch bridge
	Pont sur Couesnon	?	Vendelais	?	France	3 m	S	
Pont sur la Laye	Pont sur la Laye	Laye	Mane	1 km W	France	3 m; 7 m; 12 m	S	Segmental arch bridge
	Pont sur Loire	Loire	Lavoûte-sur-Loire	?	France	?	?	
	Pont sur l'Oued Djilf	Oued Djilf	Maktar	15 km E	Tunisia	6 × 5.4 m	M	
	Pont sur Rhone	Rhône	Arles	?	France	?	?	
	Pont sur Rhone	Rhône	Vienne	To Ste Colombe les Viennes	France	?	?	
	Pont Vieux	Hérault	Le Vigan	?	France	?	?	
	Pontaccio	Nimbalto	Loano	On Via Julia Augusta 44° 7'54.24"N 8°15'24.26"E	Italy, Northern	10 m	S	
	Ponte Altinate	Brenta	Padua	To E of town	Italy, Northern	11.14 m; 12.29 m; 10.90 m	S	Segmental arch bridge
	Ponte Alto	?	Terracina	On Via Appia	Italy, Southern	1 × S	S	
	Ponte Amato	Fosso Collafri	Gallicano	0.4 km SW on Via Praenestina	Italy, Rome & vicinity	5 m	M	
	Ponte Antico	Fosso dell'Acqua Traversa	Terracina	On Via Appia	Italy, Southern	1 × S	S	
	Ponte Apollosa	?	Benevento	About 8 km SW	Italy, Southern	S; M; S	M	
	Ponte Calamone	?	Narni	2.5 km N on Via Flaminia	Italy, Central	3.3 m; 1.4 m; 3.3 m	S	
	Ponte Caldaro	?	Narni	5 km N on Via Flaminia	Italy, Central	3.4 m; 5.5 m; 7.9 m; 5.5 m; 3.4 m	S	42°34'12.88"N, 12°32'17.92"E
	Ponte Catena	?	Cori	Outside Porta Ninfina	Italy, Rome & vicinity	1 × S	L	
			Birori	Sardinia	Italy, Insular			
				on the ancient route between Uselis and Forum Traiani, Sardinia	Italy, Insular			
	Pont'Ecciu	Flumineddu	Allai	Sardinia	Italy, Insular			
	Ponte Corvo	Bacchiglione	Padua	To E of town	Italy, Northern	7.7 m; 8.7 m; 11 m	S	Segmental arch bridge
	Ponte Corvo	?	Benevento	About 5 km SW	Italy, Southern	2 × S	S	
	Ponte da Catribana	Bolelas	Sintra	In parish of São João das Lampas	Portugal	?	S	
	Ponte da Ribeira de Odivelas	Ribeira de Odivelas	Vila Ruiva	1,5 km away from Vila Ruiva	Portugal	?	S	Several arches are buried.
	Ponte de Arena	?	Monza	?	Italy, Northern	5.1 m	S	
	Ponte dei Ciclopi	?	Cantiano	c. 3 km N on Via Flaminia	Italy, Central	3.7 m	S	
	Ponte dei Ladroni	V. d. Ferrara	Benevento	17 km ENE on Via Traiana	Italy, Southern	3 m; 10 m; 14 m	?	
	Ponte degli Angeli	Bacchiglione	Vicenza	Near Chiesa d. Angeli	Italy, Northern	5 × M	S	
	Ponte Romano dell'Aurelia		Santa Marinella	Via Aurelia	Italy, Rome & vicinity	1 × S	S	
	Ponte Romano di Largo Impero		Santa Marinella	Via Aurelia	Italy, Rome & vicinity		S	
	Ponte Romana di Viale Roma		Santa Marinella	Via Aurelia	Italy, Rome & vicinity	1 × S	S	
	Ponte Romana di Via Asiago		Santa Marinella	Via Aurelia	Italy, Rome & vicinity	1 × S	S	
	Ponte di Apollo		Santa Marinella	Via Aurelia, at 60.9 km	Italy, Rome & vicinity	2 × S	S	
	Ponte del Diavolo	Spalla Bassa	Cassino	0–12 km SW	Italy, Southern	5.5 m	S	
	Ponte del Diavolo	Titerno	Campobasso	?	Italy, Southern	1 × M	S	
	Ponte del Diavolo	?	Blera	In gorge below town	Italy, Central	3 × S	S	
	Ponte del Diavolo	?	Manziana	W of Lago di Bracciano	Italy, Central	7 m	S	
	Ponte del Diavolo	?	Massa Martana	13 km N on Via Flaminia	Italy, Central	3.3 m	S	
Ponte del Gran Caso	Ponte del Gran Caso	Gran Caso	Ascoli Piceno	2 km E on Via Salaria	Italy, Central	6 m	M	
	Ponte del Tirso	Tirso	Oristano	Sardinia	Italy, Insular	Ruins	?	
Ponte dell'Abbadia	Ponte dell’Abbadia	Fiora	Vulci	8 km N of Montalto di Castro	Italy, Central	S; c. 25 m; S	L	
	Ponte dell’Acqua	?	Finale Ligure	In Val Ponci on Via Julia Augusta	Italy, Northern	1 × S	S	
	Ponte dell’Acquoria	Aniene	Tivoli	1.2 km W	Italy, Rome & vicinity	7 × S	?	
	Ponte della Regina	Brembo	Almenno	Lecco-Bergamo	Italy, Northern	8 × M	M-H	
	Ponte della Rocca	?	Blera	1 km W on Via Clodia	Italy, Central	1 × S	M	
Ponte della Scodella	Ponte della Scodella	Cavignano	Ascoli Piceno	On Via Salaria 2 km east of Ascoli	Italy, Central	10.8 m	S	
	Ponte delle Chianche	T. d. Buonalbergo	Montecalvo	3.5 km NW on Via Traiana	Italy, Southern	6 × M	S	
	Ponte delle Fate	?	Finale Ligure	In Val Ponci on Via Julia Augusta	Italy, Northern	5.7 m; S	M	
	Ponte delle Voze	Voze	Finale Ligure	In Val Ponci on Via Julia Augusta	Italy, Northern	4–5 m	S	
	Ponte detto delle Piangole	Metaurus	?	Pesaro region	Italy, Central	4 × M	M	
	Ponte d’Arli	Tronto	Arli	14 km W of Ascoli Piceno on Via Salaria	Italy, Central	17 m	M	42°47'53.29"N, 13°27'38.22"E
	Ponte di Solestà	Tronto	Ascoli Piceno		Italy, Central		S	42°51'30.62"N, 13°34'18.85"E
Ponte d'Augusto at Rimini	Ponte d'Augusto	Marecchia	Rimini	On Via Aemilia	Italy, Central	8.7 m; 8.9 m; 10.6 m; 8.9 m; 8.0 m	S	
Ponte d'Augusto	Ponte d'Augusto at Narni	Nera	Narni	0.5 km N on Via Flaminia	Italy, Central	19.6 m; 32.1 m; 18 m; 16 m	L	Tallest Roman road bridge
	Ponte di Agosta	Aniene	Agosta	8 km S of Arsoli	Italy, Rome & vicinity	7 × S	S	
	Ponte di Cassino	Valle del Rapido	Cassino	About 3 km N	Italy, Southern	1 × S	S	
	Ponte di Caudino	Lorenzino	Caudino	Near Arcevia	Italy, Central	8 m	S	
Ponte di Cecco	Ponte di Cecco	Castellano	Ascoli Piceno	E entrance to city 42° 51′ 9.2″ N, 13° 35′ 9″ E	Italy, Central	14.5 m; 7.2 m	H	
	Ponte di Chatillon	Marmore	Châtillon	In town	Italy, Northern	15 m	M	
	Ponte di Corso V. Emanuele	?	Milan	Beneath C. V. Emanuele	Italy, Northern	2.6 m	S	
	Ponte della Concordia (Diocletian)	Metaurus	Fossombrone	2.5 km SW	Italy, Central	c. 20 m	L	
	Ponte di Fiumicinetto	Gressaga	S. Dona d. Piave	N	Italy, Northern	3 × c. 7 m	S	
	Ponte di Fossato di Vico	Regalino	Fossato di Vico	c. 1.5 km E of Via Flaminia	Italy, Central	1 × S	S	
	Ponte di Gavoi	?	Gavoi	SW of Nuoro, Sardinia	Italy, Insular	5 × S-M	S	Now submerged in a reservoir
	Ponte di Mezzocamino	?	Rome	?	Italy, Rome & vicinity	1 × S	S	
	Ponte di Nona, Small	T. Marrana	Rome	12 km E on Via Praenestina	Italy, Rome & vicinity	6 m	S	
Ponte di Nona	Ponte di Nona, Large	T. Marrana	Rome	12 km E on Via Praenestina	Italy, Rome & vicinity	S; 7 × 6 m; S	L	
	Ponte di Nepi	?	Nepi	42°14'28.24"N 12°20'43.26"E	Italy, Central	1 × S	S	
	Ponte di Pioraco	?	Pioraco	c. 25 km NE of Nocera Umbra	Italy, Central	1 × S	S	
	Ponte di Pollenza	?	Pollenza	10 km SW of Macerata	Italy, Central	M; S	S	
Ponte di Porta Cappuccina	Ponte di Porta Cappuccina	Tronto	Ascoli Piceno	NW entrance to city 42°51'32.52"N, 13°34'17.06"E	Italy, Central	22.2 m	L	
	Ponte di Porta Rimini	Foglia	Pesaro	?	Italy, Central	28.7 m; 6.3 m	M	
	Ponte di Porta Tufilla	Tronto	Ascoli Piceno	N entrance to city 42°51'24.95"N, 13°34'41.91"E	Italy, Central	2 × M; S	M	
	Ponte di Promontogno	?	Promontogno	Near Chiavenna	Italy, Northern	1 × S	M	
	Ponte di Quintodecimo	Tronto	Quintodecimo	24 km W of Ascoli Piceno on Via Salaria	Italy, Central	17.1 m	M	
	Ponte di Rodi	?	?	Island of Rhodes	Greece	2 × S	S	
	Ponte romano (Santa Giusta)	?	Santa Giusta	on the road from Othoca to Carales, Sardinia	Italy, Insular			
	Pontimannu	?	Sant'Antioco	Sardinia	Italy, Insular			
Church built atop ancient bridge	Ponte di San Giovanni de Butris	?	Acquasparta	1 km S on Via Flaminia	Italy, Central	2 × 8.7 m	S	
	Ponte di San Giuliano	Rapido	Atina	In town	Italy, Southern	2 × M	M	
	Ponte di Sant’Arcangelo di Romagna	Uso	Rimini	c. 12 km W on Via Aemilia	Italy, Northern	c. 4 m	S	
	Ponte di Smirra	?	Acqualagna	2.0 km S on Via Flaminia	Italy, Central	3.8 m	S	
	Ponte di Sperlonga	?	Sperlonga	Near the Villa of Tiberius	Italy, Southern	4.7 m	S	
	Ponte di Terra	San Vittorino	Fosso di Ponte Terra		Italy, Rome & vicinity	4.9 m	S	
	Ponte di Traiano	Metaurus	Fossombrone	5 km SW on Via Flaminia	Italy, Central	4 m; 11.3 m; 11.3 m	M	
	Ponte di Tre Ponti	Pontine Marshes	Terracina	About 15 km NW on Via Appia	Italy, Southern	2 × S	S	
	Ponte di Vigna Capoccio	Fosso di Carano	Velletri	4 km SW on Via Appia	Italy, Rome & vicinity	1 × S	?	
	Ponte Etrusco	?	Sigillo	7.5 km N on Via Flaminia	Italy, Central	4 m	S	
	Ponte Fonnaia	Naia	Acquasparta	3 km N on Via Flaminia	Italy, Central	3.4 m	S	
	Ponte Furo	Retrone	Vicenza	Near Campo Marzio	Italy, Northern	2 × 4.6 m	S	
	Ponte Genga	Sentino	Fabriano	16 km NE	Italy, Central	8 m	M	
	Ponte Grosso	Burano	Cantiano	N on Via Flaminia	Italy, Central	2 × 7 m	S	
	Ponte Grosso a Pontericcioli	Fosso della Scheggio	Scheggia	6 km N on Via Flaminia	Italy, Central	? × 3.4 m	S	
	Ponte Ladricio	Eisack	Franzensfeste	?	Italy, Northern	?	?	
	Ponte Leproso	Sabato	Benevento	About 1 km SW 41° 7'53.15"N, 14°45'55.38"E	Italy, Southern	5 × S	S	
	Ponte Loreto		Lanuvium	south of Lanuvium on the via Astura	Italy, Central		S	
Ponte Lucano panorama modifié-1	Ponte Lucano	Aniene	Tivoli	3.5 km W on Via Tiburtina	Italy, Rome & vicinity	5 × S	S	
	Ponte Lungo	?	Albenga	On Via Julia Augusta	Italy, Northern	10 × 6.6-8.4 m	S	
	Ponte Mammolo	Aniene	Rome	8 km ENE on Via Tiburtina	Italy, Rome & vicinity	S; 16 m; S	M	
	Ponte Mallio	Bosso	Cagli	0.5 km N on Via Flaminia43°33'0.79"N 12°39'1.10"E	Italy, Central	11.7 m	S	
	Ponte Marzio	Serio	Gorle	Near Bergamo	Italy, Northern	3 × M	S	
Ponte Molino	Ponte Molino	Bacchiglione	Padua	To NE of town	Italy, Northern	7.80 m; 8.86 m; 11.47 m; 8.51 m; 7.81 m	S	Segmental arch bridge
	Ponte Nascosa	?	Civitamassa	c. 9 km NW of L'Aquila on Via Caecilia	Italy, Central	S	S	
	Ponte Nepesino	Fosso Cerreto	Nepi	3 km S on Via Amerina	Italy, Central	4 × S	S	
	Ponte Nomentano	Aniene	Rome	6 km NE on Via Nomentana	Italy, Rome & vicinity	S; L; S	M	
	Ponte Petreo	?	Ravenna	c. 3 km S	Italy, Northern	?	?	
	Ponte Picchiato	Miccino	Orte	12 km SE on Via Flaminia	Italy, Central	11.5 m	S	
Ponte Pietra	Ponte Pietra	Adige	Verona	NE corner of town	Italy, Northern	5 × M	S	
	Ponte Pietra	Ofanto	Canosa di Puglia	5 km W on Via Traiana	Italy, Southern	2 spans	?	
	Ponte Piro	?	Barbarano Romano	4 km SE of Blera on Via Clodia	Italy, Central	?	?	
	Ponte presso Tor di Valle	?	Rome	10 km SW on Via Ostiensis	Italy, Rome & vicinity	1 × S	S	
	Ponte presso Torre Pastore	?	Civita Castellana	0.3 km N of P. Ritorto	Italy, Central	3.1 m	S	
	Ponte Pusterla	Bacchiglione	Vicenza	On Via Claudia Augusta	Italy, Northern	3 × M	S	
Quarteira Roman Bridge, Paderne	Ponte da Ribeira de Quarteira	Quarteira River	Paderne	Albufeira	Portugal			Bridge was re-built following the 1755 earthquake
	Ponte Ritorto	Fosso di Chiavello	Civita Castellana	4 km E on Via Flaminia	Italy, Central	5.9 m	S	
Roman Bridge	Ponte Vella (Ponte Romana)	Minho	Ourense	?	Spain	?		
Roman Bridge, Tramatza	Ponte Romano	Mannu Ozieri	Tramatza	road from Forum Traiani to Othoca, Sardinia	Italy, Insular			
	Ponte Romano	Garafo	Acquasanta Terme	On Via Salaria	Italy, Central	10.5 m	M	
Ponte Romano	Ponte Romano	Tanagro	Auletta	3 km NW on Via Popilia (or Annia)	Italy, Southern		M	
Ponte Romano in Rieti	Ponte Romano	Velino	Rieti	In town, on Via Salaria	Italy, Central		S	
	Ponte Rotto	Carapelle	Foggia	15 km SE on Via Traiana	Italy, Southern	10 × S-M	S	
	Ponte Rotto	Cervaro	Foggia	10 km S on Via Traiana	Italy, Southern	17 × S-M	S	
Engraving of the Ponte Salario by Giovanni Battista Piranesi from between 1754 and 1760	Ponte Salario	Aniene	Rome	5 km N on Via Salaria	Italy, Rome & vicinity	8.5 m; 26.7 m; 8.5 m	M	
	Ponte Sambuco	Ariana creek	Belmonte in Sabina	2.5 km SW, on Via Salaria	Italy, Central	1 × S	S	
	Ponte San Giorgio	?	Arsoli	3 km N on Via Valeria	Italy, Rome & vicinity	1 × S	S	
	Ponte Sanguinario	Tessino	Spoleto	Beneath Piazza Garibaldi	Italy, Central	S; 6.2 m; 6.8 m; S	S	
	Ponte Sanguinaro	Sanguinaro	Otricoli	7 km NE on Via Flaminia	Italy, Central	?	?	
	Ponte San Lorenzo	Bacchiglione	Padua	To E of town	Italy, Northern	12.8 m; 14.4 m; 12.5 m	S	Segmental arch bridge
	Ponte San Lorenzo	?	Bullicame	1 km NE of Viterbo on Via Cassia	Italy, Central	1 × S	S	
	Ponte San Matteo	Bacchiglione	Padua	To E of town	Italy, Northern	?	?	
	Ponte San Nicolao	?	Viterbo	Via Cassia	Italy, Central	1 × M	S	
	Ponte San Vito	Uso	Rimini	10 km W on Via Aemilia	Italy, Northern	1 × S	S	
	Ponte Sardone	?	Palestrina	0.7 km SW on Via Praenestina	Italy, Rome & vicinity	?	?	
	Ponte Scutonico	?	Arsoli	2 km S on Via Valeria	Italy, Rome & vicinity	1 × S	S	
	Ponte Sodo	Valchetta	Veii	On N boundary	Italy, Rome & vicinity	?	?	
	Ponte Spiano	Fonturce	Sigillo	6 km N on Via Flaminia	Italy, Central	3.25 m	S	
	Ponte sul Adda	Adda	Olginate	S of Lecco	Italy, Northern	4.8 m	S	
	Ponte sul Canalat	Canalat	Ceggia	?	Italy, Northern	8.3 m; 7.4 m; 6.8 m	S	
	Ponte sul Lemene	Lemene	Concordia Sagittaria	?	Italy, Northern	?	S	
	Ponte sul Mannu	Mannu	Porto Torres	To W of town, Sardinia	Italy, Insular	5.4 m; 5.4 m; 3 m; 5.3 m; 5.2 m; 12.5 m; 19.5 m	M	
	Ponte sul Fosso della Mola	Fosso della Mola	Nepi	2 km E	Italy, Central	1 × M	S	
	Ponte sul Fosso Tre Ponti	Fosso Tre Ponti	Nepi	4 km N on Via Amerina	Italy, Central	4.6 m	M	
	Ponte sul Fratta	Fratta	Orte	13 km SE on Via Flaminia	Italy, Central	?	?	
	Ponte sul Natissa	Natissa	Aquileia	?	Italy, Northern	1 × S	S	45°46'24.08"N, 13°22'11.30"E
Ponte sul Ofanto	Ponte sul Ofanto	Ofanto	Canosa di Puglia	5 km W on Via Traiana	Italy, Southern	7 × S-M	S	
	Ponte sul Reno	Reno	Bologna	On Via Aemilia	Italy, Northern	?	?	
	Ponte sul Rio della Torre	Rio della Torre	San Lorenzo al Mare	On Via Julia Augusta	Italy, Northern	4 m	S	
	Ponte sul Rubicone	Rubicon	Savignano	On Via Aemilia	Italy, Northern	3 × 6.2 m	S	
Hannibal's bridge	Sant' Angelo Roman bridge	Savuto	Scigliano	Via Popilia (or Annia)	Italy, Southern	20.5 m	M	
	Ponte sul Tevere	Tiber	Sigliano	?	Italy, Central	?	?	
	Ponte sul Treia	Treia	Civita Castellana	5 km NE on Via Flaminia	Italy, Central	?	?	
	Ponte sull’Ausa	Ausa	Rimini	Near Arch of Augustus	Italy, Central	S; M	S	
	Ponte sulla Dora	Dora Baltea	Ivrea	In town	Italy, Northern	L; M; S	M	
	Ponte Taverna	Burano	Cagli	0.5 km S on Via Flaminia	Italy, Central	4.8 m; 16.2 m	?	
	Ponte Tufaro	?	Benevento	About 10 km SW	Italy, Southern	3 × S	S	
	Ponte Valentino	Calore	Benevento	5 km E on Via Traiana 41° 8'45.29"N, 14°49'51.08"E	Italy, Southern	15 m; 18 m; 15 m	M	
	Ponte Vecchio	?	Rapallo	In town	Italy, Northern	1 × M	S	
	Ponte Voragine	?	Scheggia	3 km N on Via Flaminia	Italy, Central	3 m	S	
	Pont’Ezzu	Mannu	Ozieri	Sardinia	Italy, Insular			
	Fertilia		Alghero	Sardinia	Italy, Insular			
Pont Ezzu (Old Bridge), Roman bridge near Mores, Sardinia (16744259602)	Pont’Ezzu		Mores	Sardinia	Italy, Insular			
	Primo Ponte	Topino (old riverbed), since 13th century Canale dei Molini	Foligno	Via Augusto Bolletta	Italy, Central	4 × S	S	
	Secondo Ponte or "Ponte di Cesare"	Topino (old riverbed), since 13th century Canale dei Molini	Foligno	Via Feliciano Scarpellini	Italy, Central	7 × S	S	
	Terzo Ponte	Topino (old riverbed), since 13th century Canale dei Molini	Foligno	Via San Giovanni dell’Acqua	Italy, Central	9 m; 9 m; 10 m; 9 m; 9 m	S	
	Quarto Ponte	Topino (old riverbed), since 13th century Canale dei Molini	Foligno	Via Madonna delle Grazie	Italy, Central	8 m; 10 m; 8 m	S	
	Primo Ponte	?	Gualdo Tadino	In vicinity	Italy, Central	c. 4 m	M	
	Secondo Ponte della Val Quazzola	?	Quiliano	Near Ricchini	Italy, Northern	6 m	S	
	Terzo Ponte della Val Quazzola	?	Quiliano	2 km beyond Secondo Ponte della Val Quazzola	Italy, Northern	c. 6 m	S	
	Quarto Ponte della Val Quazzola	?	Quiliano	Volta locality	Italy, Northern	?	?	
	Quinto Ponte della Val Quazzola	?	Quiliano	Colle sul Rio d. Scarroni	Italy, Northern	?	?	
	Sesto Ponte della Val Quazzola	?	Quiliano	Rio del Gallo	Italy, Northern	?	?	
	Primo Ponte di Val Ponci	?	Finale Ligure	In Val Ponci on Via Julia Augusta	Italy, Northern	1 × S	S	
	Quarto Ponte di Val Ponci	?	Finale Ligure	In Val Ponci on Via Julia Augusta	Italy, Northern	?	?	
	Pontetto	?	Loano	On Via Julia Augusta	Italy, Northern	1 × S	S	
	Ponticello	?	Benevento	In town, to E	Italy, Southern	1 × M	M	
	Ponticello	?	Cantiano	0.2 km N of Ponte di Ciclopi	Italy, Central	1 × S	S	
	Ponticello dell’Abbazia	Candigliano	Acqualagna	4 km N on Via Flaminia	Italy, Central	2.1 m; 2.8 m	S	
	Ponticello di Case Nuove	?	Acqualagna	N on Via Flaminia	Italy, Central	1.4 m	S	
	Ponticello di Isernia	?	Isernia	?	Italy, Southern	1 × M	S	
	Ponte di Pietralunga		Paternò		Italy, Sicily	1 × S	S	
	Ponticello sul Selino	Selino	Selinunte	Near Castelvetrano	Italy, Sicily	1 × S	S	
Puente del Bibey	Ponte do Bibei	Bibei	A Pobra de Trives	c. 8 km towards Petín	Spain	6.1 m; 18.5 m; 8.8 m	L	
	Puente de Alardos	Alardos	Madrigal de la Vera	?	Spain	22.8 m	M	
Puente de Alcántara	Puente de Alcántara	Tagus	Toledo	E approach to town	Spain	16 m; 28.3 m	L	
	Puente de Alcantarilla	Salado de Moran	Utrera	32 km SE of Seville	Spain	5.4 m; 5.7 m	S	
Puente de Cangas de Onís	Puente de Cangas de Onís	Sella	Cangas de Onís	?	Spain	7.7 m; 21.6 m; 9.5 m; 6.8 m; 4.3 m; 3.6 m	M	Three main arches pointed. Dates originally from 2nd century AD
	Puente de Cáparra	Ambroz	Plasencia	20 km N	Spain	8.7 m; 9.2 m	S	
	Puente de Carmona	?	Carmona	28 km E of Seville	Spain	4 m; 4 m; 5 m; 4 m; 4 m	S	
Roman Bridge at Chaves	Roman Bridge	Tâmega	Chaves	In town	Portugal	c. 13 × S	S	
	Puente de El Garro	Almonte	Alconétar	Now flooded	Spain	?	?	
	Puente de Guallaminos	Guallaminos	Villanueva de la Vera	?	Spain	18.6 m	S	
	Puente de Guijo de la Granadilla	Alagón	Plasencia	c. 20 km N	Spain	19.1 m	M	
	Puente de Entrambasaguas	Pancrudo	Luco de Jiloca	?	Spain	5.4 m; 11.2 m; 5.4 m	S	
		Jiloca	Calamocha	?	Spain	7.7 m	S	
	Puente de Lumbier	Irati	Lumbier	At Hoz de Lumbier	Spain	1 × M	L	
	Puente de Medellín	Guadiana	Medellín	35 km E of Mérida	Spain	28 × 12 m	S	
	Pont de Monistrol	Llobregat	Monistrol de Montserrat	In town	Spain	37 m; 27 m; 17 m; 12 m	M	Not a roman bridge
	Puente de Órbigo	Rio Órbigo	Órbigo	In town	Spain	>5 × S	S	
	Puente de Palmero	Rio Gritos	Valeria		Spain		S	
	Puente de Piedra (Zaragoza)	Ebro	Zaragoza	In town	Spain	?	?	
	Pont de Pedra	Segre	Lleida	In town	Spain	?	?	
	Ponte da Pobra de Trives	Xares	A Pobra de Trives	Near Mendoya	Spain	7 m	S	
Puente de Segura	Ponte de Segura	Erges/Erjas	Segura	1 km south	Portugal	7 m; 7 m; 10 m; 7 m; 7 m	M	
	Pont de Saint-Vincent	Cillian	Saint-Vincent	1 km east	Italy, Northern	9.7 m; 3.1 m	S	
	Pont de Santa Coloma	Gran Valira	Santa Coloma	3 km S of Andorra la Vella	Andorra	S; M	S	
	Puente de Tres Puentes	Zadorra	Iruña de Oca	9 km W of Vitoria-Gasteiz	Spain	13 × S	S	
	Puente de Villa del Río	Salado de Porcuna	Villa del Río	10 km E of Montoro	Spain	3 m; 9.1 m; 3.6 m	S	
	Puente de Villodas	Zadorra	Villodas	c. 12 km W of Vitoria-Gasteiz	Spain	10 × S	S	
	Puente del Jándular	Jándular	Andújar	5 km W	Spain	7 × 5.1 m; 2-3 × S	S	
	Puente del Vadillo	Tamuja	Vadillo	30 km E of Cáceres	Spain	1 × M	S	
	Puente de la Cigarrosa	Sil	Petín	In town	Spain	8 m; 10 m; 4 m; 19 m; 10 m	S	
	Puente de la Doncella	Ambroz	Plasencia	c. 40 km N	Spain	9.3 m	S	
	Puente Linares	Limia	Bande	On Bande-Porquera road	Spain	7.5 m; 7 m + (2 × S)	S	
Puente Mocho at Alcolea (Córdoba)	Puente Mocha	Guadalmellato	Córdoba	10 km E	Spain	10 × 4.5-6.6 m	S	
Puente Romano at Córdoba	Puente Romano	Guadalquivir	Córdoba	In town	Spain	16 × 7.9–12 m	S	
Puente Romano at Mérida	Puente Romano	Guadiana	Mérida	S entrance to town	Spain	62 × 5.6-11.6 m	S	
	Puente Romano	Tormes	Salamanca	In town	Spain	15 × 9.4-9.7 m	S	
	Pont Vell	Fluvià	Besalú	30 km NW of Girona	Spain	?	?	
	Penkalas Bridge	Kocaçay (Penkalas)	Aezani	Çavdarhisar	Turkey	c. 3.9 m; 5.2 m; 6.5 m; 5.2 m; c. 3.9 m	S	
Penkalas Bridge in 1992	Penkalas Bridge	Kocaçay (Penkalas)	Aezani	Çavdarhisar	Turkey	5 × S	S	
	Roman bridge	Biga Çayı (Granicus)	Biga	Over Biga Çayı	Turkey	?	?	
	Roman bridge	?	Eğirdir	?	Turkey	?	?	
	Sabrina bridge	Karabudak	Zimara	?	Turkey	?	?	
	Sangarius Bridge	Sakarya (Sangarius)	İzmit	4 km W of Adapazarı	Turkey	8-12 × M	S	
	Sauerbrücke	Sauer	Wasserbillig	?	Luxembourg	?	?	
	Selinus bridge	Bergama Çayı (Selinus)	Pergamon	?	Turkey	2 × 11.4 m	S	
Pergamon Bridge	Pergamon Bridge	Bergama Çayı (Selinus)	Pergamon	Under Temple of Serapis (Red Hall)	Turkey	2 × 9 m	S	Largest ancient bridge substructure
Severan Bridge	Severan Bridge	Cendere Çayı	Kahta	41 km E of Adıyaman	Turkey	34.2 m	L	Largest known extant single arch
	Shkumbi bridge	Shkumbi	Topcias	Near Shenjan	Albania	17 × S	?	
Sankt Dionysen bridge	Sankt Dionysen bridge	Murufer	Sankt Dionysen	Between Sankt Dionysen and Oberdorf	Austria	1 × S	S	
	Susegana Bridge	?	Susegana	In frazione Colfosco on Via Claudia Augusta	Italy, Northern	5.3 m	S	Segmental arch bridge
	Taşköprü	Seyhan	Adana	?	Turkey	21 × S	S	
Roman Bridge at Alter do Chão	Vila Formosa Bridge	Seda	Alter do Chão	10 km W	Portugal	6 × c. 9.6 m	S	
	Viadotta di Valle Ariccia	Valle Ariccia	Rome	27 km SE on Via Appia	Italy, Rome & vicinity	3 × S	S	
	Viadotta sulla Via Aurelia	?	Rome	Pons Cestius-Janiculum	Italy, Rome & vicinity	1 × S	?	
	Viaduct over the Fosso di Ponte Terra	Fosso di Ponte Terra	San Vittorino	1 km NE	Italy, Rome & vicinity	4 × M	M	
	Voltarella	?	Civita Castellana	5 km NE on Via Flaminia	Italy, Central	3.1 m	S	
	White Bridge	Biga Çayı (Granicus)	?	Road to Gallipoli	Turkey	S; S; 4 × M; S; S	?	Plundered for material in 19th century
	Zakho bridge	Little Khabur	Zakho	In town	Iraq	S; L; S	L	
	?	Arapgir Çayı	Korpanik	3 km E	Turkey	30 m	?	
	?	Asopus	Laodicea on the Lycus	?	Turkey	8.0 m; 12.3 m; 7.1 m	M	
	?	Bues	Ganagobie	W bank of Durance, S of Sisteron	France	?	?	
	?	Escoutay	Viviers	?	France	?	?	
	?	Fosso del Giardinetto	Rome	11 km E on Via Labicana	Italy, Rome & vicinity	5.7 m	S	
	?	Fosso della Valchetta	Castel Giubileo	0.25 km N	Italy, Rome & vicinity	2 × 7 m	S	
	?	Fosso di Palidoro	Palidoro	Beneath farmhouse	Italy, Rome & vicinity	2 × S	?	
	?	Fosso Malafede	Ostia	9 km NE on Via Ostiensis	Italy, Rome & vicinity	2 × S	S	
	?	Göksu (Calycadnus)	Silifke	?	Turkey	5 × c. 17 m; 2 × 4.3 m	S	
	?	Guadiana	Mertola	?	Portugal	?	?	
	?	Marsyas	Incekemer	?	Turkey	3 × M	M	
	?	Nahr er Rukkad	?	W of Bostra	Syria	8 spans	?	
	?	Nile	Aswan	?	Egypt	?	?	
	?	Numicus	Ostia	2 km SE on Via Severiana	Italy, Rome & vicinity	3 × S	S	
	?	Saboun-Souyou	Aleppo	70 km N	Syria	3.8 m; 8.4 m; 10 m; 9.8 m; 8.2 m; 3.8 m	M	
	?	Saboun-Souyou	Aleppo	Cyrrhus-Gaziantep	Syria	4.2 m; 9.3 m; 4.7 m	S	
	?	Wadi Suweida	Suweida	N of Bostra	Syria	1 span	?	
	?	Wadi Zeidi	el-Tali’a	W of Bostra	Syria	2 × S	S	
	?	Yeşil (Iris)	Amasya	?	Turkey	?	?	
	?	?	Antakya	N of Antakya	Turkey	1 × S	L	
	?	?	Kireli	?	Turkey	?	?	
	?	?	Qodana	W of Bostra	Syria	3 spans	?	
	?	?	Sette Vene	15 km N of Veii on Via Cassia	Italy, Central	1 × S	?	

== Timber and stone pillar bridges ==
A timber bridge is a structure composed wholly out of wood, while a stone pillar bridge features a wooden superstructure resting on stone pillars. Strictly speaking, many bridges of the second type should be rather called "concrete pillar bridges", as the Romans preferably used opus caementicium for constructing their bridge piers (stone was confined in these cases to covering). Both types, timber bridges and stone respectively concrete pillar bridges, are listed here in the same category as historically, with the consolidation of Roman power in the newly conquered provinces, wooden bridges often gave way to solid pillar bridges.

Image	Name	River	Town	Country	Spans	Comment
Relief on Trajan's Column	Apollodorus Bridge (or Trajan's Bridge)	Danube	Turnu-Severin/Kladovo	Romania/ Serbia	21 × >30 m	Concrete pillars; longest arch bridge for over 1000 years
Caesar's Rhine Bridge, by John Soane (1814)	Caesar's Rhine bridges	Rhine	Koblenz	Germany	c. 26 spans	
	Constantine's Bridge	Danube	Oescus/Corabia	Bulgaria/Romania	?	Concrete pillars
	Cornelius Fuscus's Bridge	Danube	Orlea	Romania/ Bulgaria	?	Timber bridge
	Sangarius Bridge	Siberis	Sykeon	Turkey	8 × 5.4-9.6 m	
	London Bridge	Thames	London	England	?	
Piercebridge	Piercebridge Roman Bridge	Tees	Piercebridge	England	?	
	Pons Aelius	Tyne	Newcastle	England	?	
Drawing from 1881	Pons Sublicius	Tiber	Rome	Italy	?	
	Pons Tirenus	Garigliano	Minturnae	Italy	?	
Römerbrücke at Trier	Roman Bridge	Moselle	Trier	Germany	?	Arches added in Middle Ages
Fanciful depiction from 1608. View from north	Römerbrücke	Rhine	Cologne	Germany	20 spans	
Modern inscription of the Roman bridge	Römerbrücke	Rhine	Mainz	Germany	?	First built c. 30 AD
	?	Churn	Cirencester	England	?	
	?	Eden	Hyssop Holme Well	England	?	
	?	Forth	?	Scotland	?	
	?	Irthing	Willowford	England		Possible stone arches
	?	Kelvin	Summerston	Scotland	?	
	?	Loire	Orléans	France	?	
	?	Loire	?	France	?	
	?	Rede	Elishaw	England	?	
	?	Rede	Risingham	England	?	
	?	Rhone	Geneva	Switzerland	?	
	?	Saône	?	France	?	
	?	Seine	Paris	France	?	
	?	Tees	Pounteys Bridge	England	?	
	?	Trent	Cromwell	England	?	Probably 8th century, not Roman
	?	Tyne	Corbridge	England	6-11 × S	Possible stone arches
	?	Wear	Binchester	England	?	
	?	?	Hunwick Gill	England	?	
	?	Fleet	London, Newgate	England	?	
	?	?	Wallasey	England	?	
	?	Nene	Water Newton	England	?	
	?	Severn	Wroxeter	England	?	
	?	Hart Burn	Rothley	England	?	abutment at NZ045871
	?	Tyne	Bywell	England	>=5	piers destroyed 1836
	?	Wansbeck	near Marlish	England	?	stones at NZ077844
	?	Hart Burn	Hartburn	England	?	post-holes at NZ088866
	?	South Tyne	Underbank	England	?	abutment at NY699493

== Pontoon bridges ==
As an alternative to ferry services, the Roman army often made use of pontoon bridges, along with timber structures, for river crossings. They usually consisted of boats lashed together, with the bows pointing towards the current. Permanent bridges of boats were also commonly set up for civilian traffic.

Character	River	Town	Country	Comment
Bridge of boats	Danube	Kostolac	Serbia	
Bridge of boats	Danube	Turnu-Severin	Romania/ Serbia	
Bridge of boats	Sakarya (Sangarius)	Adapazarı, 4 km SW	Turkey	Replaced by stone arches of Sangarius Bridge under reign of Justinian I (r. 527-565)

== Aqueduct bridges ==
Image	Destination (Town)	Name	Country	Location	Bridge length	Aqueduct length	Comment
	Aix-en-Provence	?	France		?	?	
	Alabanda	?	Turkey			?	
	Alatri	?	Italy		?	?	
	Alcanadre	?	Spain			?	
	Alinda	?	Turkey			?	
	Almuñécar	?	Spain			?	
	Ansignan	?	France			?	
	Antibes	La Bouillide	France			?	
	Antibes	La Fontveille	France			?	
	Antioch	?	Turkey			?	
	Anzio	?	Italy		?	?	
	Aosta	Pont d'Aël	Italy			?	
	Arles	Barbegal	France	Fontvieille, Bouches-du-Rhône		?	
	Aspendus	?	Turkey			?	
	Athens, Hadrianic aqueduct		Greece			?	
	Athens, Nea Ionia	Late Roman aqueduct	Greece			?	
	Barcelona	?	Spain			?	
	Bavay	?	France		?	?	
	Baelo-Claudia	?	Spain		?	?	
	Beirut	Aqueduct of Zubaida	Lebanon	Mansourieh	?	20 km	
	Bologna	?	Italy		?	?	
	Bonn	Bonn Aqueduct	Germany			?	
	Bordeaux	?	France		?	?	
	Cádiz	?	Spain		?	?	
	Caesarea	?	Israel			?	
	Carthage	Zaghouan Aqueduct, Carthage	Tunisia			?	
Acquedotto romano Valcorrente2	Catania	Valcorrente	Italy		?	?	
	Catania	Porrazzo (Paternò)	Italy		?	?	
	Chelva	Peña Cortada	Spain		?	?	
	Chemtou	?	Tunisia		?	?	
	Cherchell	?	Algeria			?	
	Cimiez	?	France		?	?	
	Civitavecchia	?	Italy			?	
Reconstructed section near Mechernich-Vussem	Cologne	Eifel Aqueduct	Germany	Euskirchen		130 km	Largest ancient structure north of the Alpes
	Constantine	?	Algeria			?	
	Die	?	France		?	?	
	Kato Doliana, Astros	Aqueduct of Villa of Herodes Atticus	Greece		?	?	
	Ephesus	?	Turkey			?	
	Ephesus, Sirince		Turkey			?	
	Erythrai	?	Turkey		?	?	
	Évreux	?	France		?	?	
	Fréjus	?	France			?	
	Gadara	Gadara Aqueduct	Jordan			170 km	Longest tunnel of antiquity (94 km)
	Granada	?	Spain		?	?	
Valens Aqueduct	Istanbul	Valens Aqueduct	Turkey			250 km	
	Italica	?	Spain			?	
	Kavala	?	Greece			?	
	Khémissa	?	Tunisia			?	
	Laodicea	?	Turkey			?	
	Tours	Luynes	France			?	
	Lyon	Brevenne	France		?	?	
	Lyon	Yzeron	France			?	
	Lyon	Gier	France			?	
	Lyon	Mont d’Or	France		?	?	
Römersteine ("Roman Stones")	Mainz	Römersteine	Germany		?	?	
	Marseille	?	France		?	?	
	Mérida	Cornalvo	Spain		?	17 km	
Acueducto de los Milagros	Mérida	Proserpina, Acueducto de los Milagros	Spain			12 km	UNESCO World Heritage Site
	Mérida	Las Tomas (Rabo de Buey)	Spain			?	
	Metz	?	France			?	
Minturnae Aqueduct	Minturno	?	Italy			?	
Ponti Rossi Napoli	Naples	Aqua Augusta, Serino aqueduct	Italy			140 km	Constr. 10AD
Susa acquedotto	Susa		Italy				
Acquedotto-6	Vicenza		Italy				
Mytilene (Lesbos)	Mytilene, Lesbos	?	Greece			?	
	Musti	?	Tunisia		?	?	
St George	Nicopolis (near Preveza)	Actia Nicopolis	Greece			50 km	
	Nîmes	Pont du Gard	France			?	UNESCO World Heritage Site
	Nîmes	Pont de Bornègre	France			?	
	Orange	?	France		?	?	
	Paris	Lutetia	France	Arcueil	?	26 km	
Patras	Patras	?	Greece			?	
	Pézenas	?	France		?	?	
	Périgueux	?	France		?	?	
	Phaselis	?	Turkey			?	
	Poitiers	?	France		?	?	
	Plovdiv		Bulgaria			30 km	
	Pompeii	?	Italy		?	?	
Bridge arch of Pont d'Aël	Pont d'Aël, Aymavilles	Pont d'Aël	Italy, Northern		14.24 m span	6 km	66 m above bottom of valley
	Ponte del Toro	Terni	Italy, Central		9 m		
	Rodez	?	France		?	?	
Porta Maggiore	Rome	Aqua Anio Novus	Italy		14 km	86.8 km	Constr. 38-52 AD. 189,520 m³ a day
Anio Vetus	Rome	Aqua Anio Vetus	Italy			?	
Aqua Alexandrina	Rome	Aqua Alexandrina	Italy		2 km	22 km	Constr. 226 AD
	Rome	Aqua Alsietina	Italy				
Aqua Claudia	Rome	Aqua Claudia	Italy		14 km	68.6 km	Constr. 38-52 AD. 184,280 m³ a day
	Rome	Ponte S. Antonio, Aqua Claudia	Italy				
	Rome	Aqua Julia	Italy		10 km	68.6 km	Constr. 33 BC. 48,240 m³ a day
Aqua Marcia	Rome	Aqua Marcia	Italy	Tivoli, Lazio	10 km	91.4 km	Constr. 144-140 BC. 187,600 m³ a day
	Rome	Ponte Lupo, Aqua Marcia	Italy				
	Rome	Aqua Tepula	Italy		9 km	17.7 km	Constr. 126 BC. 17,800 m³ a day
	Rome	Ponte Arcinelli (Aqua Anio Novus)	Italy				
	Rome	Ponte Barucelli (Aqua Anio Novus, Aqua Claudia)	Italy				
	Rome	Ponte Della Mola, Aqua Anio Vetus	Italy			?	
	Rome	Ponte San Pietro, Aqua Marcia	Italy			?	
	Sádaba	?	Spain		?	?	
	Saintes	?	France		?	?	
	Salona	Diocletianus Aqueduct	Croatia			?	
	Samosata	?	Turkey			?	
	Sebaste	?	Turkey			?	
	Sbeitla	?	Tunisia			?	
Aqueduct of Segovia	Segovia	Aqueduct of Segovia	Spain			?	UNESCO World Heritage Site
	Sens	?	France		?	?	
	Seville	Caños de Carmona	Spain			?	
Ponte delle Torri	Spoleto	Ponte delle Torri	Italy			?	
	Saint-Bertrand-de-Comminges	?	France			?	
	Saint-Rémy-de-Provence	?	France		?	?	
	Side	Naras bridge	Turkey			30 km	Later modified to a road bridge
	Side	Akcay bridge	Turkey			30 km	
	Side	Yükzekkemer bridge	Turkey			30 km	
	Side	Kirkgöz bridge, Oymapinar	Turkey		335m	30 km	
	Syracuse	?	Italy		?	?	
	Taormina	?	Italy		?	?	
	Tarquinia	?	Italy			?	
Aqüeducte de les Ferreres	Tarragona	Francolí aqueduct Aqüeducte de les Ferreres	Spain			25 km	UNESCO World Heritage Site
	Tarragona	Gayá aqueduct	Spain				
	Tébessa	?	Tunisia			?	
	Termini Imerese	Aquae Corneliae	Italy			?	
	Terracina	?	Italy			?	
Yacimiento arqueológico de Tiermes (1 de mayo de 2006, Montejo de Tiermes) 08	Termancia (Tiermes)	?	Spain			?	
	Toledo	?	Spain			?	
	Turin	?	Italy		?	?	
	Tyre	Ras al-Ain	Lebanon		?	6 km	
	Uncastillo	acueducto de Los Banales	Spain			?	
	Vaison	?	France		?	?	
	Valencia de Alcántara	?	Spain			?	
	Venafro	?	Italy			?	
	Vienne	?	France		?	?	
	Viterbo	?	Italy		?	?	
	Vulci	de:Ponte dell'Abbadia	Italy		?	?	Was a bridge for a Roman road as well as an aqueduct (note the calcification from water overflow)
	Volubilis	?	Morocco		?	?	
	?	Ponte Funicchio	Italy			?	

== See also ==
- List of ancient architectural records § Bridges
- List of Roman sites in Spain

General overview

- Roman architecture
- Roman engineering
- Roman military engineering
- Roman technology

Other Roman building structures

- Roman aqueduct
- Roman roads

== Sources ==
- O'Connor, Colin (1993). Roman Bridges. New York, N.Y.: Cambridge University Press. ISBN 978-0-521-39326-3.
- Bauer, Sibylle (2004), "Die älteste Steinbrücke am Rhein – stand sie in Mainz? Neuer Holzfund als Indiz für einen frührömischen Brückenschlag", Antike Welt, vol. 35, no. 3, pp. 83–84
- Döring, Mathias (1998), "Die römische Wasserleitung von Pondel (Aostatal)", Antike Welt, vol. 29, no. 2, pp. 127–134
- Döring, Mathias (2007), "Wasser für Gadara. 94 km langer Tunnel antiker Tunnel im Norden Jordaniens entdeckt" (PDF), Querschnitt, vol. 21, pp. 24–35, archived from the original (PDF) on 2016-01-11
- Galliazzo, Vittorio (1994), I ponti romani. Catalogo generale, vol. 2, Treviso: Edizioni Canova, ISBN 88-85066-66-6
- Galliazzo, Vittorio (1995), I ponti romani, vol. 1, Treviso: Edizioni Canova, ISBN 88-85066-66-6
- Grewe, Klaus; Özis, Ünal (1994), "Die antiken Flußüberbauungen von Pergamon und Nysa (Türkei)", Antike Welt, 25 (4): 348–352
- Hasluck, Frederick William (1906), "A Roman Bridge on the Aesepus", The Annual of the British School at Athens, 12: 184–189, doi:10.1017/s0068245400008066
- Kissel, Theodor; Stoll, Oliver (2000), "Die Brücke bei Nimreh. Ein Zeugnis römischer Verkehrspolitik im Hauran, Syrien", Antike Welt, vol. 31, no. 2, pp. 109–125
- Milner, N. P. (1998), "A Roman Bridge at Oinoanda", Anatolian Studies, vol. 48, British Institute at Ankara, Cambridge University Press, pp. 117–123, doi:10.2307/3643051, JSTOR 3643051
- Selkirk, Raymond (1995), On the Trail of the Legions, Anglia Publishing, ISBN 1-897874-14-6
- Warren, John (1991), "Creswell's Use of the Theory of Dating by the Acuteness of the Pointed Arches in Early Muslim Architecture", Muqarnas, vol. 8, Brill, pp. 59–65, doi:10.2307/1523154, JSTOR 1523154
- Wiegand, Theodor (1904), "Reisen in Mysien", Mitteilungen des Deutschen Archäologischen Instituts, Athenische Abteilung, 29: 254–339 (300–301)
- Wurster, Wolfgang W.; Ganzert, Joachim (1978), "Eine Brücke bei Limyra in Lykien. Anhang: Reste einer Brücke oberhalb von Kemer am Oberlauf des Xanthos", Archäologischer Anzeiger, Berlin: German Archaeological Institute, pp. 304–307, ISSN 0003-8105
