= Arapsu Bridge =

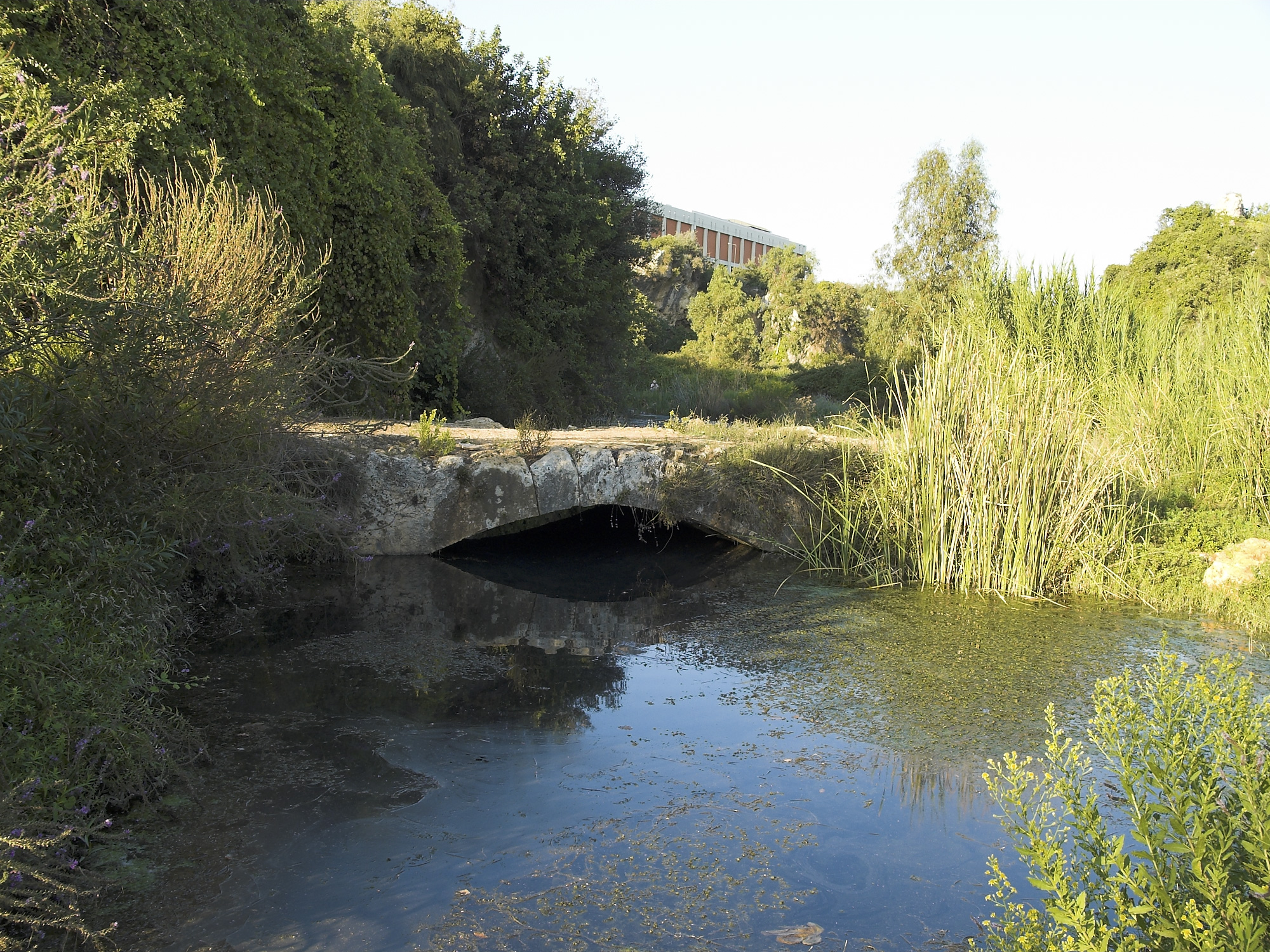
- The footbridge across the Arapsu stream
- Coordinates: 36.880906°N 30.659346°E
- Crosses: Arapsu stream
- Locale: Konyaaltı, Antalya, Turkey

Characteristics
- Design: Arch bridge
- Material: Stone
- No. of spans: 1

The Arapsu Bridge is a Roman bridge in Antalya, Turkey. The well-preserved footbridge lies in the Arapsuyu district, 5–6 km west to the city center, at the foot of an ancient mound which is associated with the Greek colony of Olbia.

Partly submerged by a modern weir about 100 m downstream, the exact form of its masonry arch is difficult to determine. According to George Bean, the slightly pointed arch indicates a post-ancient construction date. Colin O'Connor, however, classifies the bridge as a Roman segmental arch bridge, examples of which have survived in the neighbouring province Lycia (such as the Limyra Bridge).

== See also ==
- List of Roman bridges
- Ancient Roman architecture
- Ancient Roman engineering

== Sources ==
- O'Connor, Colin (1993), Roman Bridges, Cambridge University Press, p. 126 (E24), ISBN 0-521-39326-4
- Bean, George E. (1968), Turkey's Southern Shore. An Archaeological Guide, London, p. 111 (fig. 51)
