= San Francesco, Pioraco =

Building in Pioraco, Italy

Coordinates: 43°10′44″N 12°59′06″E

San Francesco is a Gothic-style, Roman Catholic church located in the town of Pioraco, province of Macerata, region of Marche, Italy.

== History ==
The church was built in the first decade of the 14th century, completed in 1327, along with the adjacent Franciscan monastery. It was built putatively atop the ruins of an Ancient Roman theater. The external structure retains some late-Romanesque features including a polygonal apse, but also have Gothic mullioned window above the portal. The stone façade is plain except for the round white stone main portal.

The interior has a wooden ceiling made with cassettoni or coffers, added in 1730. This ceiling and other baroque refurbishments eliminated some of the original frescoes depicting the life of the saint. The altar of the Crucifix was erected in 1622, by the guild of papermakers. The church also houses a canvas depicting San Carlo Borromeo by an unknown Bolognese painter. The canvases depicting the Via Crucis were painted by Mancini. Two 17th-century wooden statues depict Our Lady of Sorrows and the Apostle John. The church also has a stone sculpture of a Pietà.

== Modern day ==
In 1984, the convent became the home of the municipal offices. On Holy Friday a procession leaves this church and wends its way to the church of the Madonna della Grotta.
