= Pons Agrippae =

Ancient Roman bridge in Rome

The Pons Agrippae (Bridge of Agrippa) was an ancient bridge across the River Tiber in Rome. It was located 160 metres above the Ponte Sisto, and is known from an inscribed cippus set up by the curatores riparum during the Principate of the Emperor Claudius, suggesting it was built during or before the reign of Claudius. It was restored in 147 AD. The bridge is named after Marcus Vipsanius Agrippa, a close friend of the Emperor Augustus. Agrippa married Julia, the daughter of Augustus, and the couple lived in a villa on the opposite bank of the River Tiber. To connect his villa to the Field of Mars, where Agrippa had built several important monuments, it has been suggested that Agrippa constructed the Pons Agrippae.

The remains of four piers from the bridge were discovered in 1887; these are still somewhat visible on the right bank, but are mostly under water. These piers are misaligned with the modern current. The Pons Agrippae survived into the Middle Ages, connecting the area of the Palazzo Farnese with the Villa Farnesina, supposedly built on the site of Agrippa's villa. One arch of a bridge that connected the Palazzo Farnese to the Pons Agrippae is still intact. The Pons Agrippae was demolished when Pope Sixtus IV ordered a new bridge to be constructed, the Ponte Sisto.

== See also ==
- List of Roman bridges
