= Sangarius Bridge =

Late Roman (562) bridge in Turkey

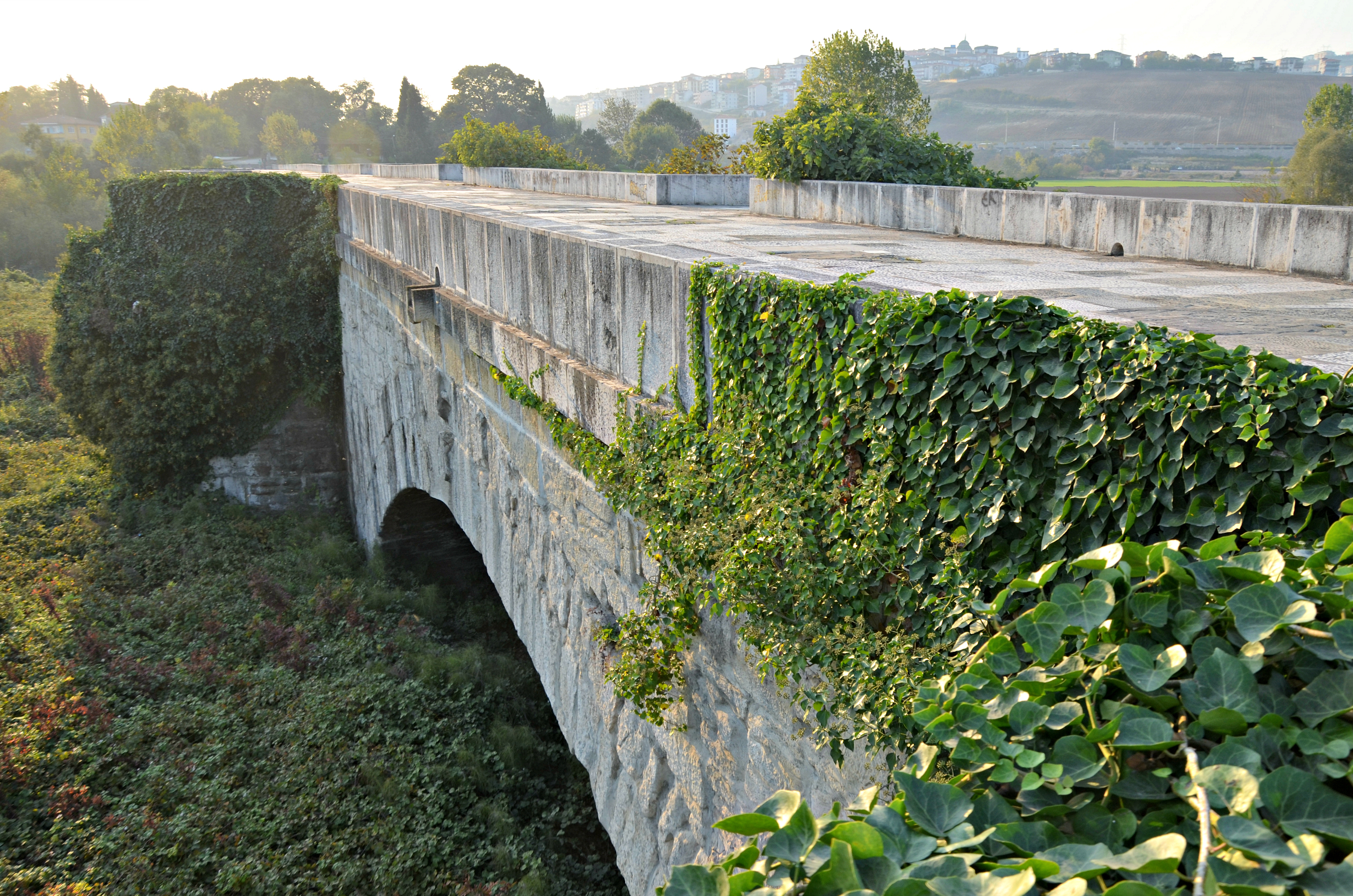
- Sangarius Bridge
- Coordinates: 40°44′N 30°22′E
- Carries: Road from Constantinople to east in Byzantine times
- Crosses: Çark Deresi (Antiquity: Sangarius)
- Locale: Close to Adapazarı, Turkey

Characteristics
- Design: Arch bridge Cutwaters on both sides
- Material: Limestone blocks
- Total length: 429 m
- Width: 9.85 m
- Height: 10 m
- Longest span: 24.5 m
- No. of spans: 7 main arches + 5 floodways
- Piers in water: 6

History
- Construction end: 562 AD

Location
- Interactive map of Sangarius Bridge

The Sangarius Bridge or Bridge of Justinian (Turkish: Justinianos Köprüsü or Beşköprü) is a late Roman bridge over the river Sakarya (Latin: Sangarius, Greek Σαγγάριος) in Anatolia, in modern-day Turkey. It was built by the East Roman Emperor Justinian I (527–565 AD) to improve communications between the capital Constantinople and the eastern provinces of his empire. With a remarkable length of 430 m, the bridge was mentioned by several contemporary writers, and has been associated with a supposed project, first proposed by Pliny the Younger to Emperor Trajan, to construct a navigable canal that would bypass the Bosporus.

== Location and history ==
The Sangarius Bridge is located in northwestern Anatolia, in the ancient region of Bithynia, ca. 5 km southwest of the town of Adapazarı. Today, the bridge spans the small Çark Deresi stream (called Melas in Antiquity), which flows from the nearby Sapanca Lake; the modern course of the far wider Sakarya lies 3 km to the East.

In Antiquity and all the way up to the Middle Ages, the bridge served an important purpose: it was the crossing-point of the strategically important military road from the Bosporus to the eastern provinces of the Roman Empire, which were threatened by the Sassanid Empire. Before the stone bridge was constructed, a wooden pontoon bridge existed, which, according to Procopius, was frequently washed away when the river flooded, costing many men their lives.

The date of construction for the stone bridge can be accurately determined from contemporary sources: two laudatory poems of Paul the Silentiary and Agathias, dating to the year 562, celebrate its completion, and the chronicler Theophanes records that the work began in Anno Mundi 6052, which corresponds to 559–560. Conversely, since Procopius states that the bridge was still under construction when he wrote his work on Justinian's building projects (De Aedificiis), this would mean that it was written in the years 560–561 and celebrated in 562, five to six years later than earlier presumed. However, given that Theophanes' dating is somewhat inaccurate, it may well be that the bridge's construction had originally started in ca. 554.

== Construction ==
The bridge is built of blocks of limestone, and, including the abutments at each end, totals 429 m in length, with a width of 9.85 m and a height of up to 10 m. The bridge rests on seven main arches. The central five arches span ranges from 23 to 24.5 m, with the piers between them ca. 6 m thick. They are complimented on either side by a smaller arch with a span of ca. 20 m. The Çark Deresi stream flows through one of the western arches today. In addition, there are further five arches (two in the western and three in the eastern ends) of between 3 and 9 m on the banks of the river bed, which served as spillways in case the river overflowed. The eastern part of the bridge has been partially destroyed by the construction of a railway line along the river's course. The seven main piers were apparently decorated with small Christian crosses, which, with the exception of two, seem to have been destroyed.

In detail, the width of the main architectural elements (spans in bold, piers in parentheses) are, in meters:

3 (N.A.) 7 (9.5) 19.5 (6) 23 (6) 24.5 (6) 24.5 (6) 24 (6) 24.5 (6) 20 (9.5) 9 (N.A.) 6 (N.A.) 3

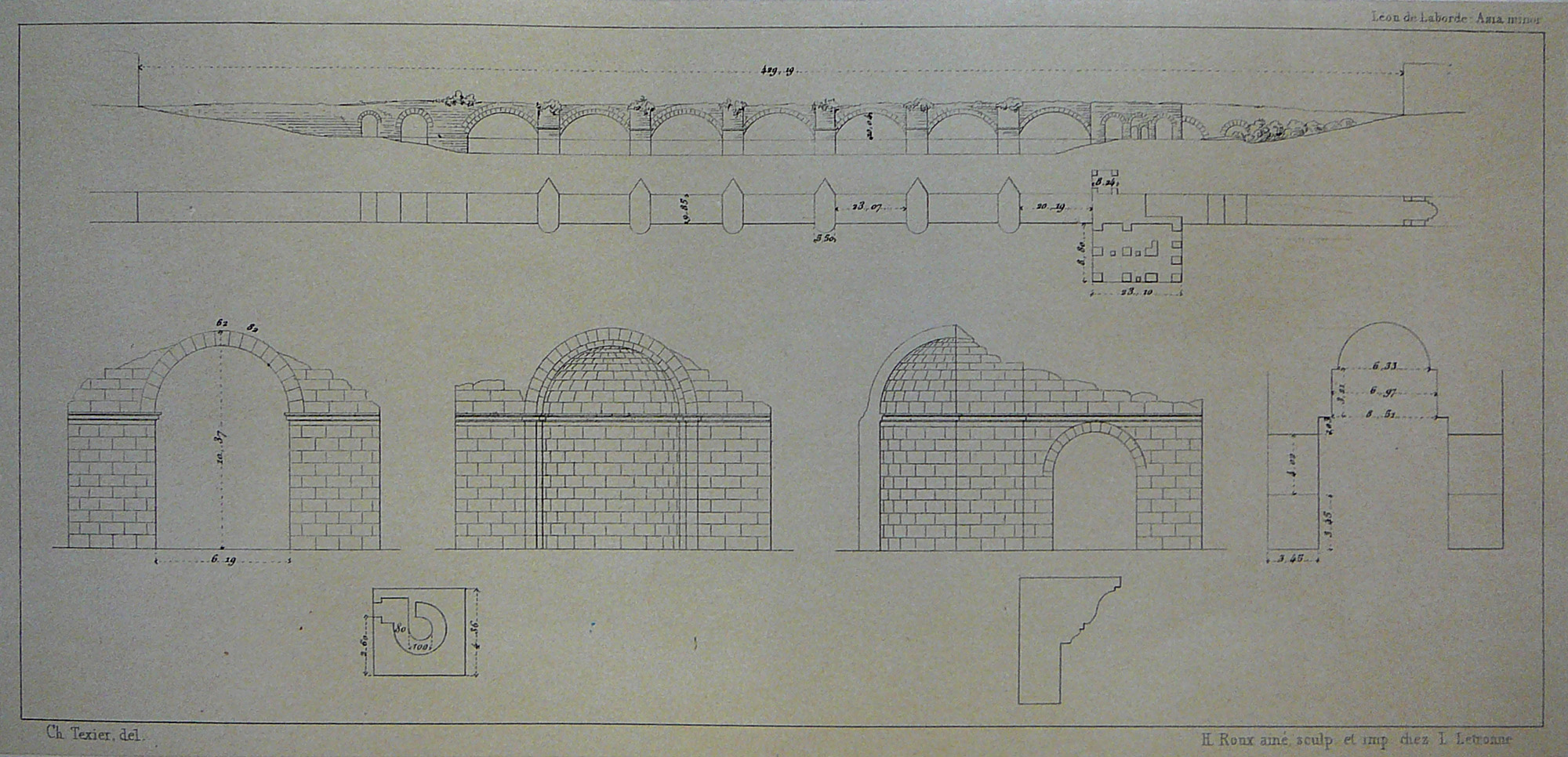
Sketch of the surviving sections of the bridge, including the now vanished triumphal arch in the western end, and the apse in the eastern end (1838)

The piers are shaped so as to act as cutwaters, rounded on the upstream and pointed on the downstream side. The only exception is the broadest pier on the western shore, which is wedge-shaped on both sides. This feature of the Sangarius bridge sets it apart from most known Roman bridges, which usually feature pointed cut-waters upstream, and – if existing – also downstream.

On the western entrance a triumphal arch stood, while on the eastern side there are the remains of an apse, whose function is unclear, but possibly served as a religious shrine. The apse features an East-oriented half-dome, and is 11 m high and 9 m wide. The remains of the arch, now vanished, are illustrated in the sketches made in 1838 by Léon de Laborde: they depict an arched doorway, made of stone masonry, lying immediately at the entrance of the bridge. The next sketch provides some measured dimensions: the doorway was 10.37 m high and 6.19 m wide, while the pillars to either side were 4.35 m thick.

The bridge was also adorned by an inscription bearing an epigram in greek by Agathias. The inscription has not survived, but its content has been preserved in the writings of Emperor Constantine VII Porphyrogenitus:

Καὶ σὺ μεθ' Ἑσπερίην ὑψαύχενα καὶ μετὰ Μήδων ἔθνεα καὶ πᾶσαν βαρβαρικὴν ἀγέλην, Σαγγάριε, κρατερῇσι ῥοὰς ἁψῖσι πεδηθεὶς οὕτως ἐδουλώθης κοιρανικῇ παλάμῃ· ὁ πρὶν γὰρ σκαφέεσσιν ἀνέμβατος, ὁ πρὶν ἀτειρὴς κεῖσαι λαϊνέῃ σφιγκτὸς ἀλυκτοπέδῃ.
You too, along with proud Hesperia and the Median peoples and all barbarian flocks, Sangarios, whose tempestuous course is broken by these arches, thus by the sovereign's hand has been enslaved. Once impassable by ships, once untamed, you now lie in shackles of unbending stone.

== Gallery ==
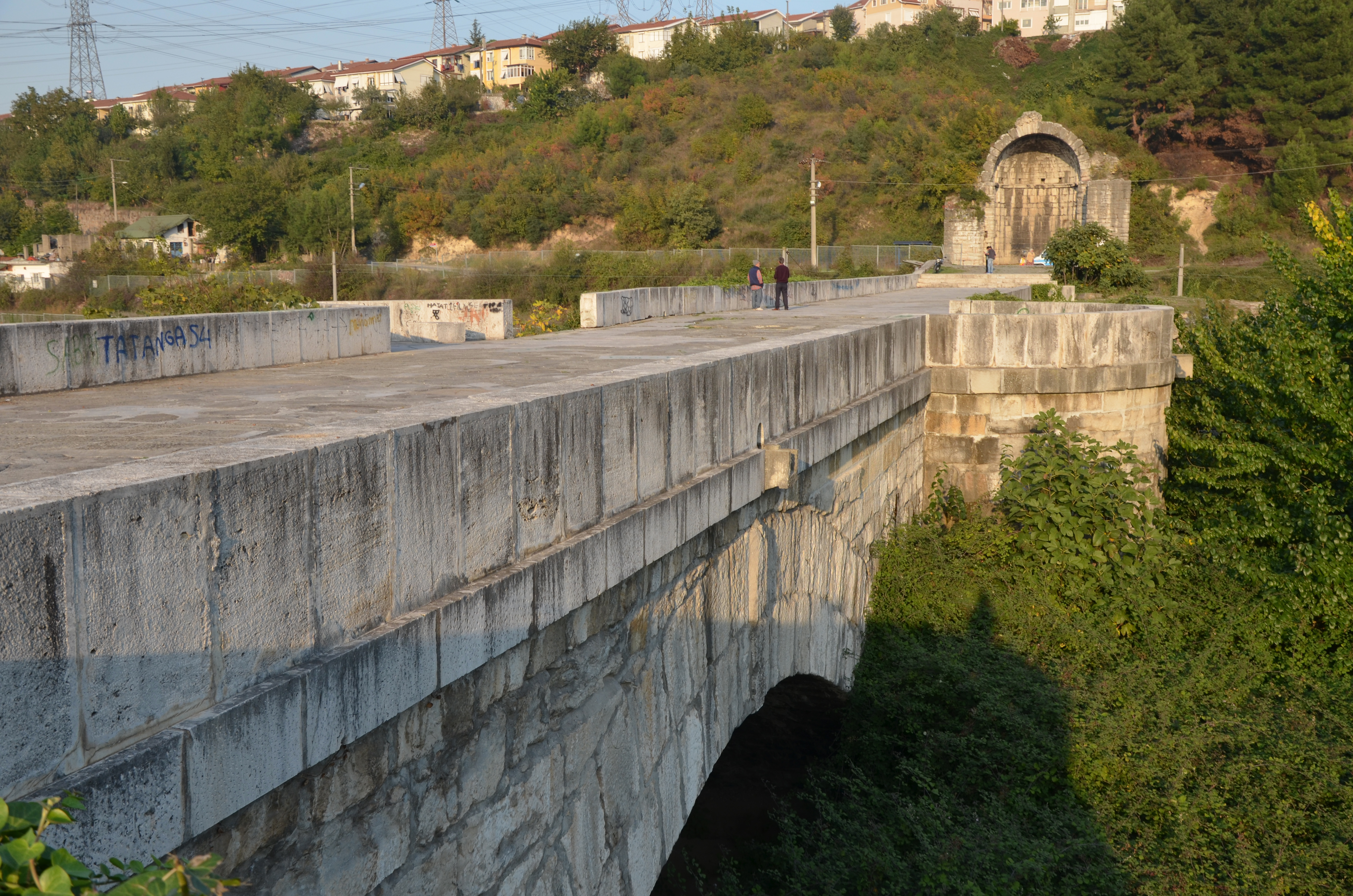

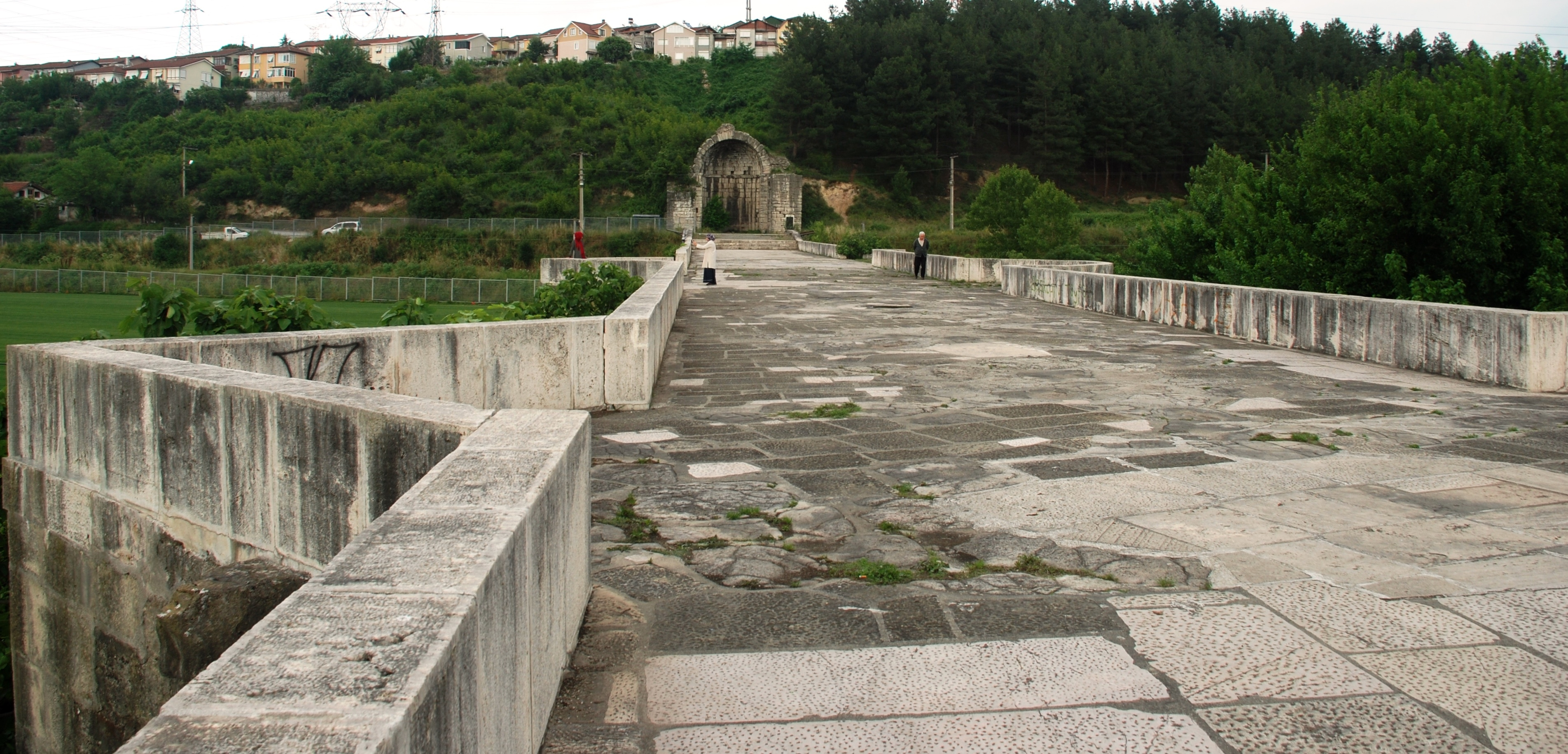

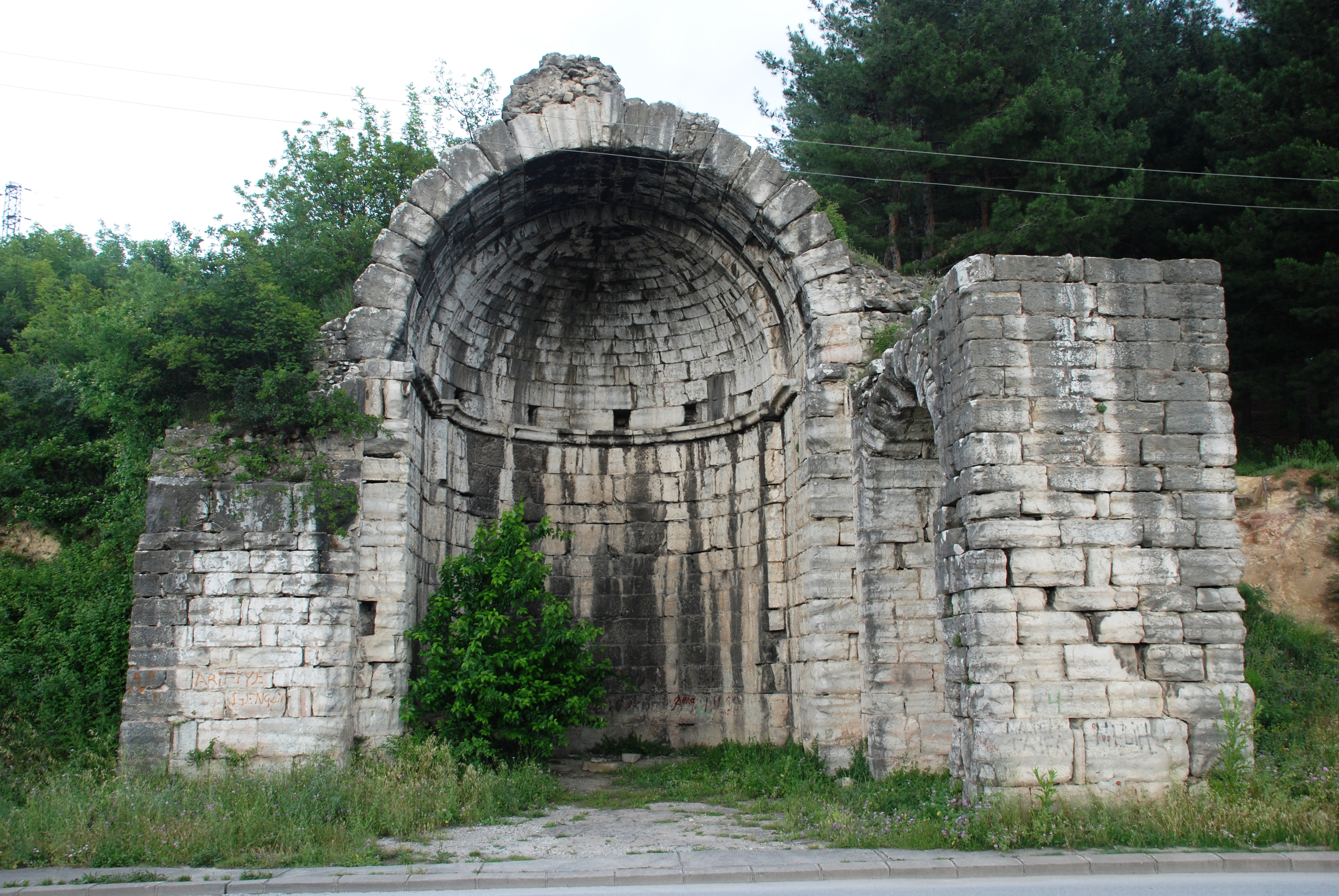

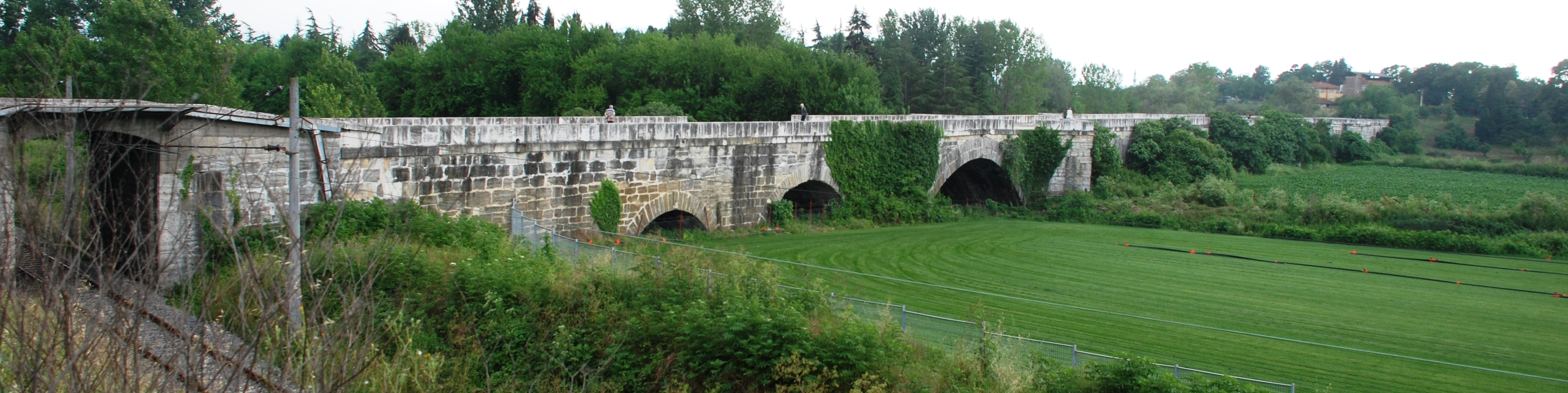

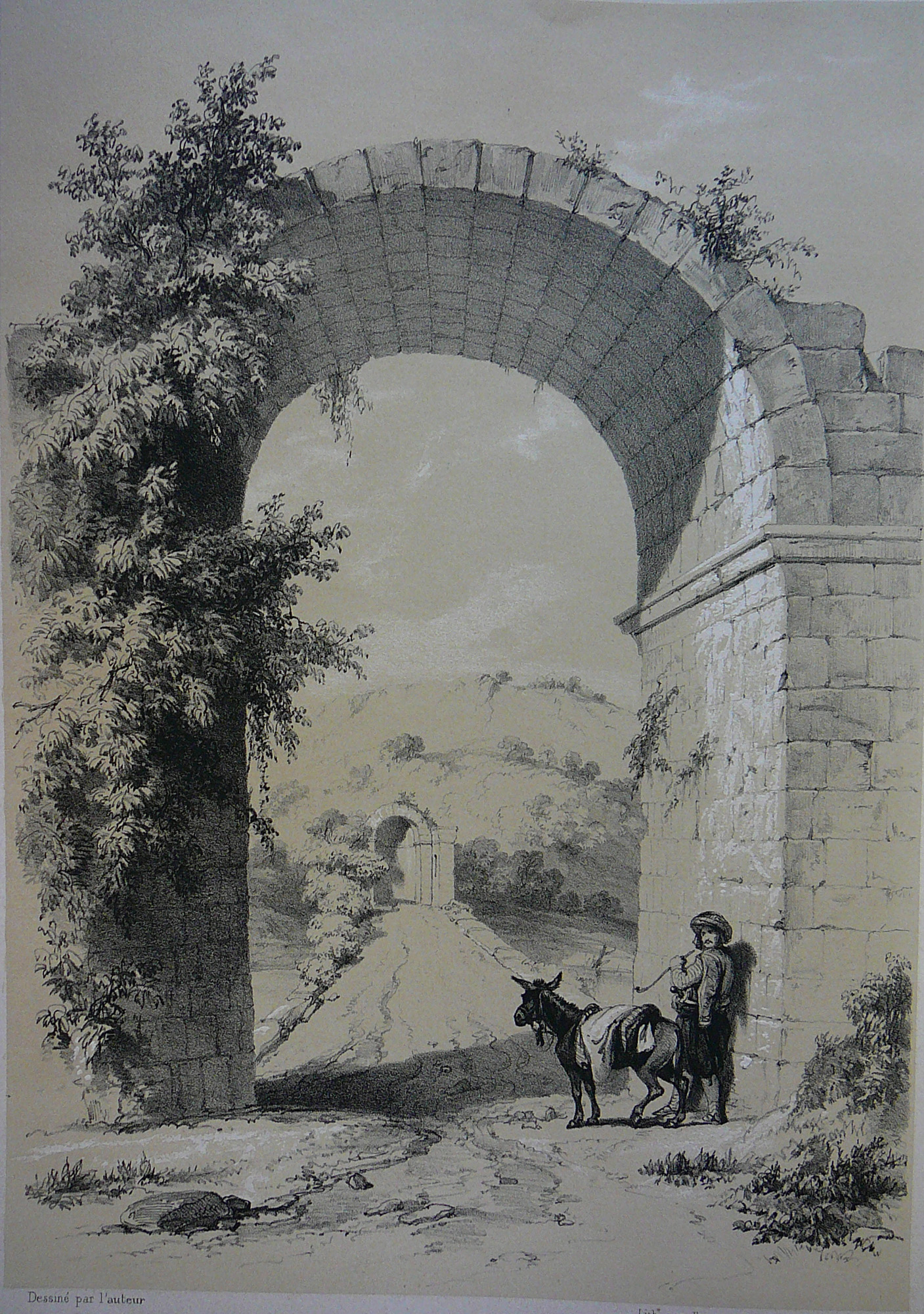

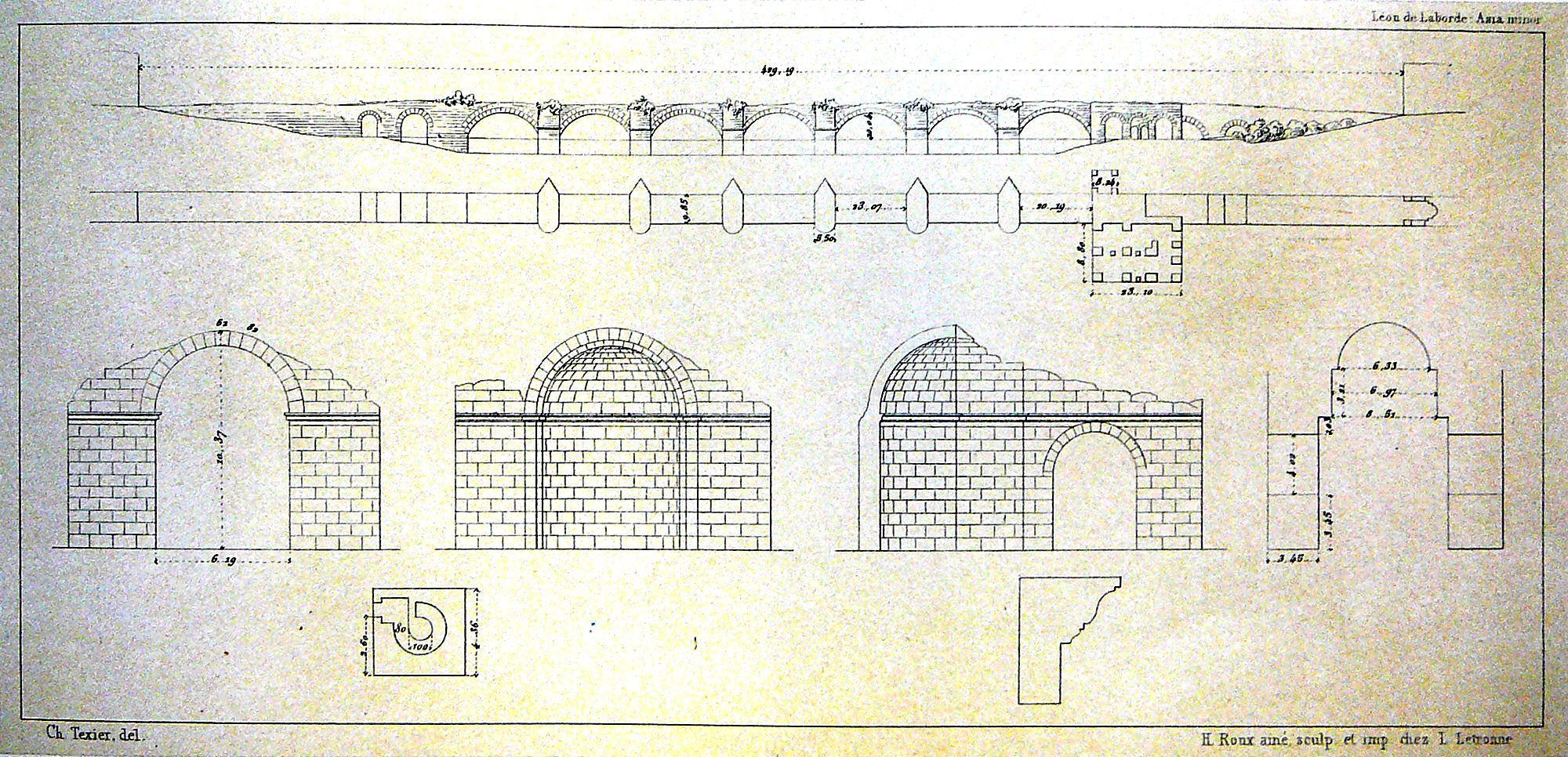

== See also ==
- List of Roman bridges
- Roman architecture
- Roman engineering

== Sources ==
- Froriep, Siegfried (1986), "Ein Wasserweg in Bithynien. Bemühungen der Römer, Byzantiner und Osmanen", Antike Welt, 2nd, Special Edition: 39–50
- de Laborde, Léon (1838), Voyage de l’Asie Mineure, Paris, pp. 32–34 & Table XIV, Nrs. 30–31
- Moore, Frank Gardner (1950), "Three Canal Projects, Roman and Byzantine", American Journal of Archaeology, 54 (2), Archaeological Institute of America: 97–111, doi:10.2307/500198, JSTOR 500198
- Whitby, Michael (1985), "Justinian's Bridge over the Sangarius and the Date of Procopius' de Aedificiis", The Journal of Hellenic Studies, 105, The Society for the Promotion of Hellenic Studies: 129–148, doi:10.2307/631526, JSTOR 631526
