= Pont sur la Laye =

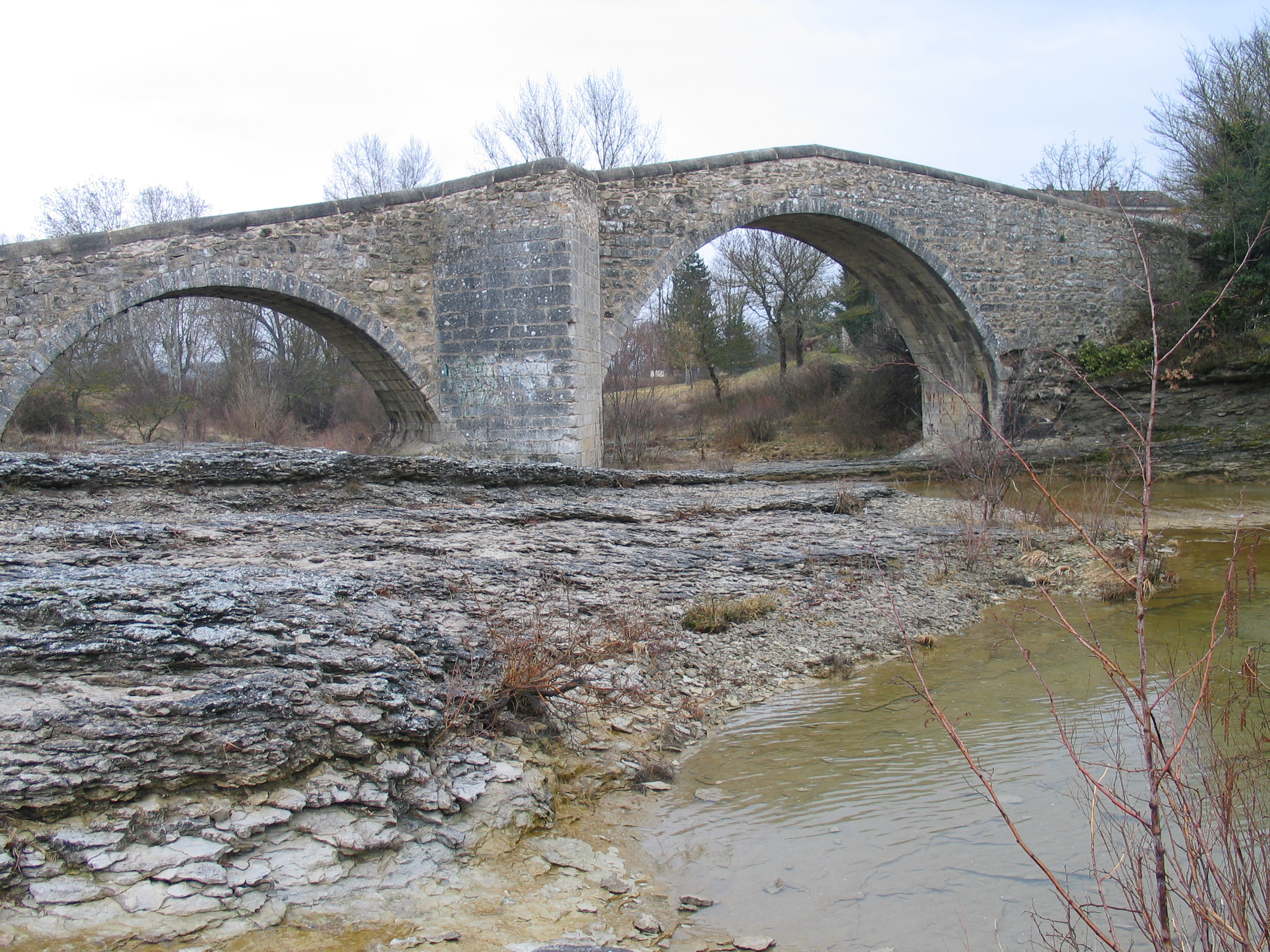
- Pont sur la Laye
- Coordinates: 43.93°N 5.756389°E
- Locale: Mane, Alpes-de-Haute-Provence, France

Characteristics
- Design: Segmental arch bridge
- Material: Stone
- Total length: 40 m
- Width: 3.2 m
- Longest span: 11.40 m
- No. of spans: 3

History
- Construction end: Roman or Romanesque period

Location
- Interactive map of Pont sur la Laye

The Pont sur la Laye or Pont roman de Mane (English: Romanesque Bridge of Mane) is an old stone arch bridge across the stream Laye in the French Provence close to the town Mane.

== Construction ==
The 40-metre-long (130 ft) and 3.2-metre-wide (10 ft) bridge features three segmental arches with a span to rise ratio of up to c. 3:1. Its spans are 2.80 m, 7.90 m and 11.40; the thickness of the two larger arch ribs is between one and two Roman feet, making the structure one of the few Roman bridges whose ratio for rib thickness to span is lower than the commonly applied ancient standard of 1:20.

The bridge was built of local limestone whose shape varies according to its function: the arches consist of voussoirs, the spandrel walls of irregular stonework. The main pier is protected both upstream and downstream by large triangular cutwaters out of rectangular blocks of stone. The paved roadway rises sharply from the left bank to the main arch, and then drops in a gentler gradient to the higher bank on the other side. The parapet, which has been reported as partly removed by O’Connor in 1993, has been apparently repaired in the meantime.

== Dating ==
According to the Italian bridge builder Gazzola, the Pont sur la Laye dates from the end of the 1st or beginning of the 2nd century AD, thus belonging to a round dozen known Roman segmental arch bridges. Structurae, though, ascribes an early Romanesque origin to the structure (11th century). Following the Mane homepage, the two side arches, along with their breakwaters, were added as late as the 17th century, which means that the segmental arches are of a relatively late date.

== See also ==
- List of Roman bridges
- Roman architecture
- Roman engineering
- Romanesque architecture
- List of medieval bridges in France

== Sources ==
- O’Connor, Colin (1993), Roman Bridges, Cambridge University Press, pp. 96 (G4), 169, 171, ISBN 0-521-39326-4
