= Ponte del Gran Caso =

- Coordinates: 42°49′56″N 13°35′14″E
- Crosses: Gran Caso
- Locale: Near Ascoli Piceno, Italy

Characteristics
- Design: Arch bridge
- Material: Travertine
- Width: 3.3 m
- Longest span: 6 m
- No. of spans: 1 (plus 2 floodways)

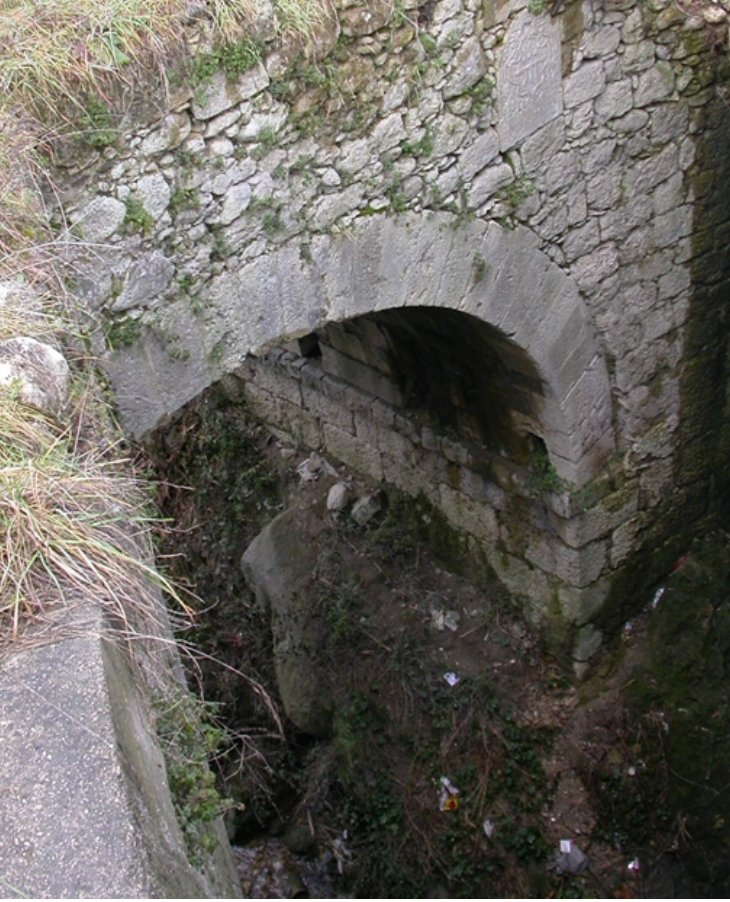
Ponte del Gran Caso

The Ponte del Gran Caso is a Roman bridge across the Torrente Gran Caso, 2 km east of Ascoli Piceno in central Italy.

The bridge has a span of 6 m, a width of 3.3 m and is built of travertine. The walls of one ramp feature two flood arches, one of which has a segmental shape and runs from the ground to the quarter point of the main arch rib. A similar segmental relieving arch can be found at another Roman bridge in central Italy, the Ponte di Pioraco.

The Gran Caso, in dialect "lu ran casc", derives its name from the Latin "casus", meaning "misfortune, an unhappy, disastrous event" and reflects the battles that took place near its banks. In 89 BC 75,000 Romans and 60,000 Picenes clashed nearby; evidence of the battle are the numerous lead bullets found. Pompey Strabo boasted strong ties with Spain and with Fermo, his city of origin, hence the FIR inscription on the recovered missile bullets. History tells us that hundreds of slingers were under his command in the ranks of the Roman army, and the knights of the so-called “Turna Sallutiana” were brought in from Spain, considered to be the main architects of the conquest of Ascoli. The Roman camp was located south of the Gran Caso ditch, towards the Tozzano plateau, where there are some hills still called "Pompè". Pompeius was later celebrated in the Campidoglio, with the “De Asculaneis Picentibus”, honours that were bestowed only for difficult undertakings and when the dead enemies amounted to at least five thousand.

A second important event took place nearby around 400, during the siege of town by Alaric I; the clash was particularly bloody so much so that the waters of the stream were tinged with the red of the blood of the corpses. However, it is said that the Goths fled, frightened by the appearance of Saint Emidius above the walls of Ascoli

== See also ==
- List of Roman bridges
- Roman architecture
- Roman engineering

== Sources ==
- O’Connor, Colin (1993), Roman Bridges, Cambridge University Press, pp. 87, 171, ISBN 0-521-39326-4
