= Ponte di Pioraco =

- Coordinates: 43°10′45″N 12°59′05″E
- Carries: Branch of Via Flaminia
- Locale: Pioraco, Italy

Characteristics
- Design: Arch bridge
- No. of spans: 1 (plus 1 floodway)

History
- Opened: Reign of Augustus (27 BC–14 AD)

The Ponte di Pioraco is a Roman bridge in Pioraco, central Italy, presumably erected under emperor Augustus (r. 30 BC–14 AD).

It belonged to a branch road of the Via Flaminia, which ran from Nocera Umbra to the east through Pioraco, San Severino, Treia and Osimo to Ancona. The structure has a single arch vault. At one end a small segmental arch springs from the ground to the quarter point of the main arch; it worked as a floodway. The Ponte del Gran Caso, which is also located in central Italy, features a similar design.

== See also ==
- List of Roman bridges
- Roman architecture
- Roman engineering

== Sources ==
- O’Connor, Colin (1993), Roman Bridges, Cambridge University Press, pp. 85, 171, ISBN 0-521-39326-4
