= Pons Probi =

Ancient Roman bridge in Rome

Coordinates: 41°52′48″N 12°28′15″E

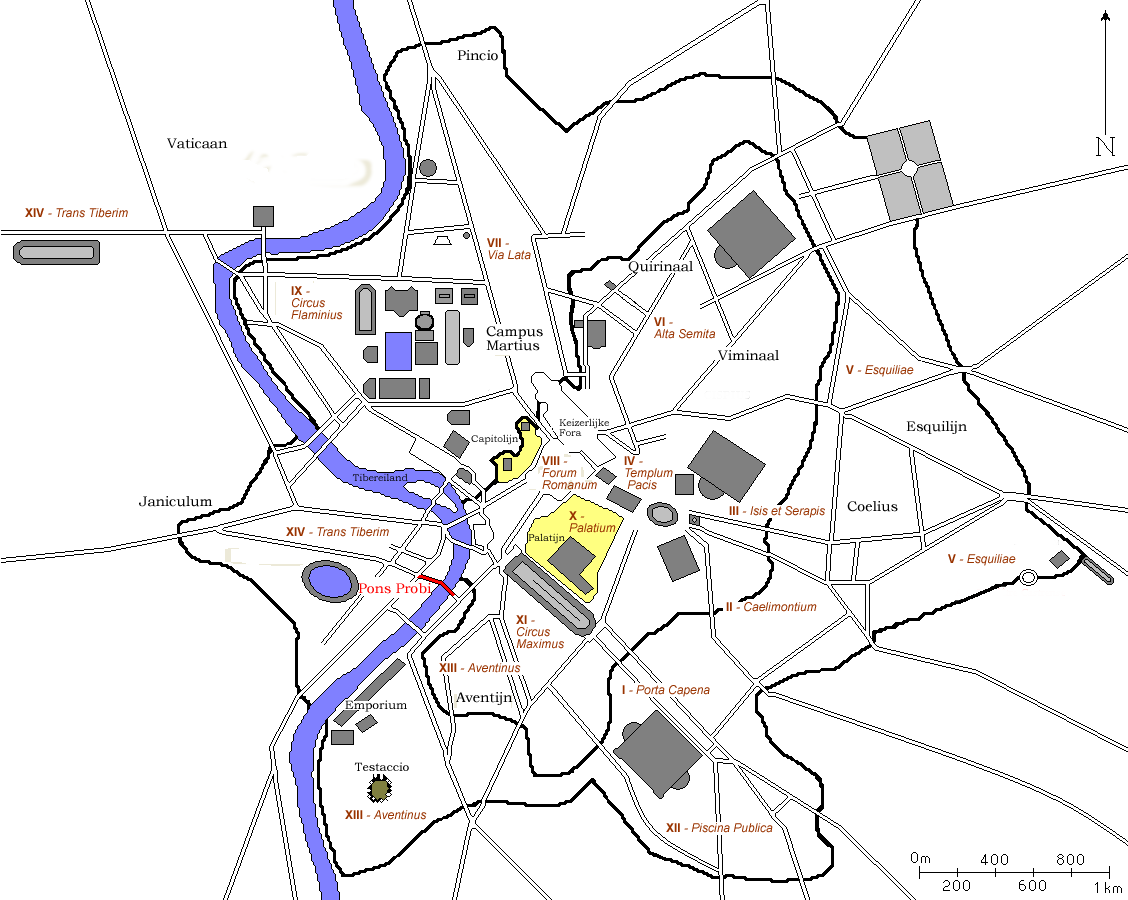
Location of the Pons Probi on a map of ancient Rome

The Pons Probi (Bridge of Probus) was a bridge over the River Tiber in Ancient Rome, just south of Porta Trigemina.

The Pons Probi connected the Aventine Hill to the Trastevere. The Roman bridge was probably built during the reign of the Emperor Probus (276–282 AD). Possibly it was built because of the grain reforms of Aurelian, Probus's predecessor, which necessitated a number of aqueduct-powered water mills in this area, and a bridge to transport the grain from these across the Tiber. Note it was part of the Aurelian wall and it was located right in front of the Porta Portuensis.

In 374 there was a heavy flood of the Tiber, and it is likely that the flood inflicted considerable damage on the bridge. Between 381 and 387 the bridge was renovated or completely rebuilt under the Emperors Theodosius I and Valentinian II. In the Middle Ages the bridge became known as the Pons Novus ("New Bridge") and Pons Marmoreus Theodosii.

The bridge was rebuilt again in the 11th century and later partially destroyed. The remains were completely demolished in 1484 by order of Pope Sixtus IV. Remains of the bridge's ancient piers were visible until the 1870s at low water level in the Tiber. The piers of the Pons Probis were finally removed in 1878.

== See also ==
- List of Roman bridges
