= George Ewart Bean =

English archaeologist and writer (1903–1977)

George Ewart Bean (1903 – 7 December 1977) was an English archaeologist and writer who specialized in classical Turkey. His father William Jackson Bean was a botanist, author, and curator of Kew Gardens. Bean was educated at St Paul's School, London from 1916 to 1921. He attended Pembroke College, Cambridge and won the Schoolbred Scholarship and the John Stewart of Rannoch Scholarship for Classics.

== Career ==
Bean returned to St Paul's School to teach ancient Greek in 1926. He took his MA from Cambridge in 1930.

In the 1930s, he organized summer school trips to the Aegean coast of Turkey. In 1943, in the middle of World War II, he was recruited by the British Council to teach English in İzmir. Several years later, he helped to set up the archaeology department at the University of Istanbul. He stayed on in Istanbul, teaching classics at the university for 24 years.

Between 1943 and 1971, Bean travelled extensively in rural Turkey in order to discover and record its classical remains. Over the years, he became a well-known and respected figure in the countryside. The publisher Ernest Benn commissioned him to write a series of archaeological guidebooks on the region. The result was a series of four books describing the classical archaeology of Turkey. These are:

- Aegean Turkey
- Turkey beyond the Maeander
- Turkey's Southern Shore
- Lycian Turkey

He was a friend of the Oxford-educated classicist Terence Mitford, and together they undertook numerous journeys into the Turkish interior. They also wrote two books together, titled Journeys in Rough Cilicia.

Bean was a physically imposing man, six foot six in height. He was an avid player of badminton and tennis, and once reached the third round at Wimbledon. His first marriage in 1946 to Nancy Ethel Rees, a fellow Cambridge graduate, lasted six years. He met his second wife Cynthia Jane Carter in Istanbul, where the latter was a schoolteacher.

George Bean died in 1977, just as the last volume in his guidebook series was going to press. He was survived by his wife, Jane and daughter, Oenone.

== Legacy ==
A photographic collection belonging to Bean is held at the Museum of Classical Archaeology, Cambridge.
