= Pioraco =

- Comune
- Comune di Pioraco
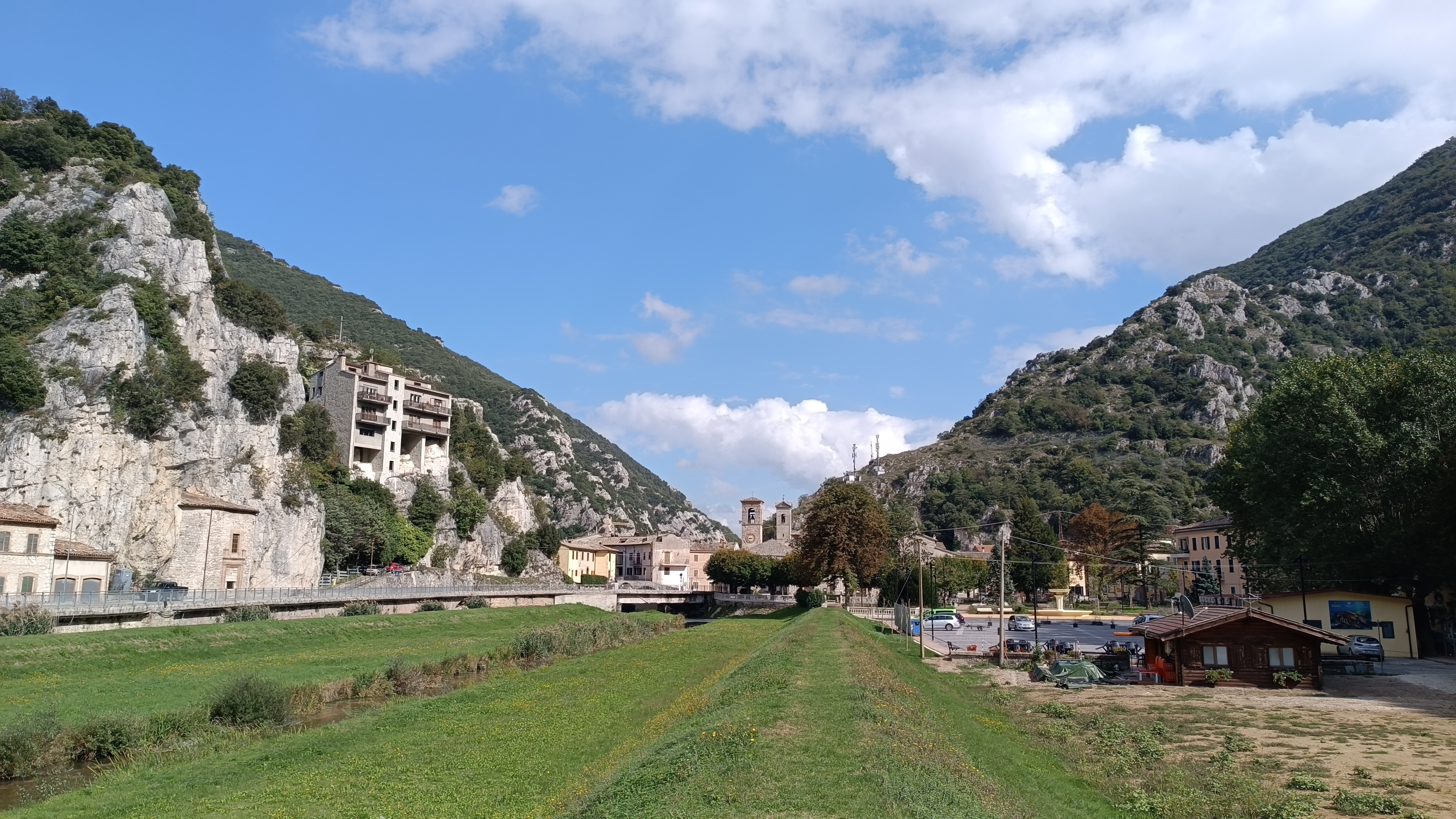

- Coat of arms

- Location within Italy Location within Marche
- Coordinates: 43°11′N 12°59′E
- Country: Italy
- Region: Marche
- Province: Macerata (MC)
- Frazioni: Seppio

Government
  - Mayor: Giovan Battista Torresi

Area
  - Total: 19.5 km^{2} (7.5 sq mi)
- Elevation: 443 m (1,453 ft)

Population (31 December 2010)
  - Total: 1,307
  - Density: 67.0/km^{2} (174/sq mi)
- Demonym: Piorachesi
- Time zone: UTC+1 (CET)
  - Summer (DST): UTC+2 (CEST)
- Postal code: 62025
- Dialing code: 0737

Pioraco is a comune (municipality) in the Province of Macerata in the Italian region Marche, located about 60 kilometres (37 mi) southwest of Ancona and about 40 kilometres (25 mi) southwest of Macerata.

== History ==
The territory of Pioraco was settled in the Neolithic Age, as shown by the remains of a Bronze Age sanctuary on the top of Monte Primo (late 11th-early 10th centuries BC). In Roman times, Pioraco was a settlement on a branch of the Via Flaminia, with bridges, temples, public edifices and an aqueduct.

In the Middle Ages, it housed a castle which was a residence of the Da Varano family, lords of the nearby Camerino. The presence of paper mills, still active today, is attested from 1346.

== Main sights ==
- San Vittorino: Pieve or parish church with baptistry, documented from 1119, built atop the remains of a Roman temple, using spolia. It houses frescoes and baptismal font from 1646.
- San Francesco: a Romanesque-style church completed in 1327, with a polygonal apse. The interior was remade in Baroque style: it houses an Annunciation attributed to Arcangelo di Cola and a Via Crucis by Francesco Mancini. The annexed convent has a frescoed cloister.
- Santissimo Crocifisso: a church built in Lombard-Gothic style. It is home to a Crucifix attributed to Girolamo di Giovanni.
- Madonna della Grotta: small 18th-century chapel/church built in a niche in the rocks, used as hermitage. It has a 15th-century wooden statue of the "Madonna with Child".
- Roman Bridge.
