= Luco de Jiloca =

Coordinates: 40°59′17″N 1°18′25″W

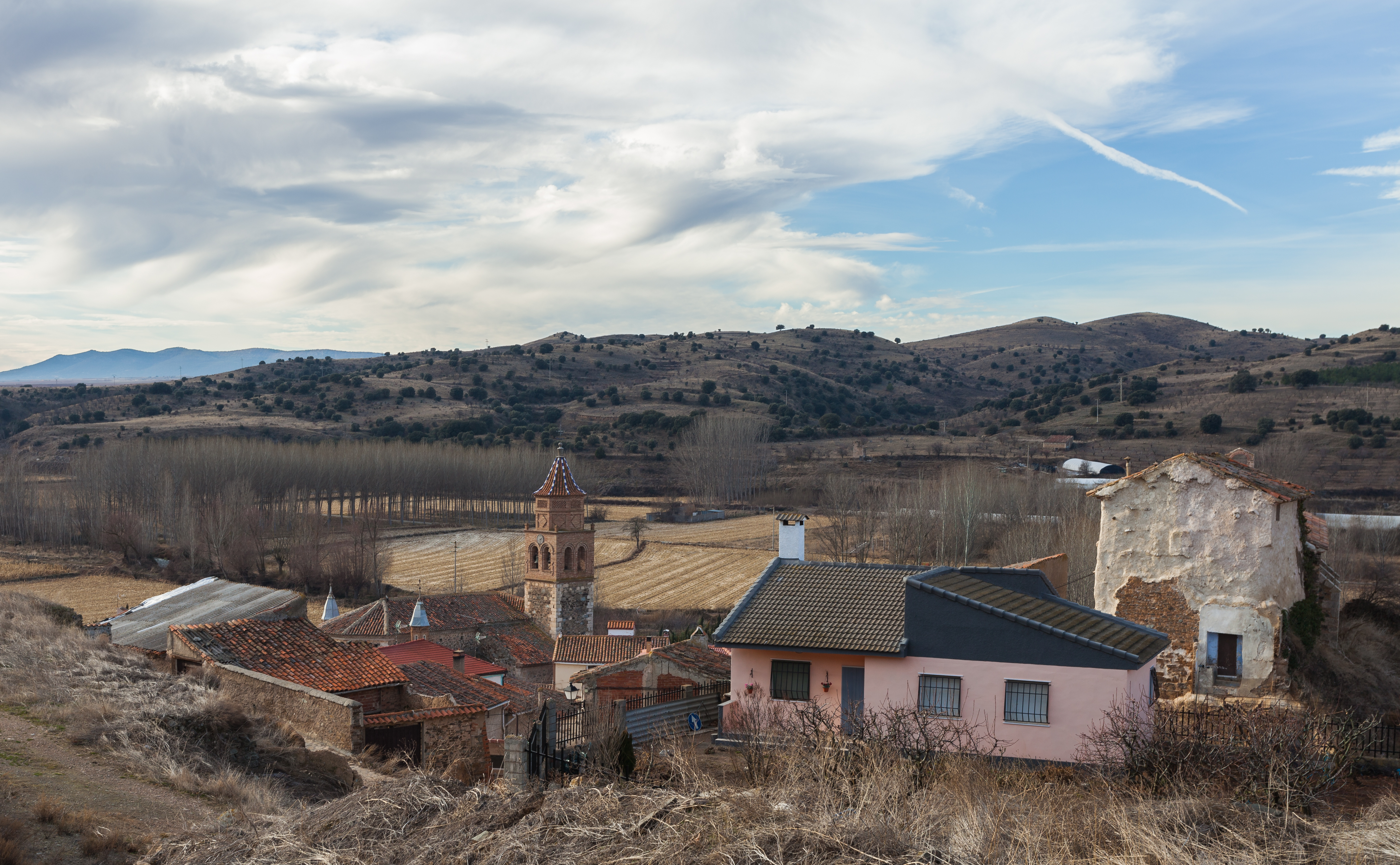
Luco de Jiloca, Teruel, Spain

Luco de Jiloca (Aragonese: Luco de Xiloca) is a village in Calamocha, Teruel, Spain. Its name comes from the Latin word "lucus" meaning "sacred wood or cave."
