= Vadillo =

- Municipality
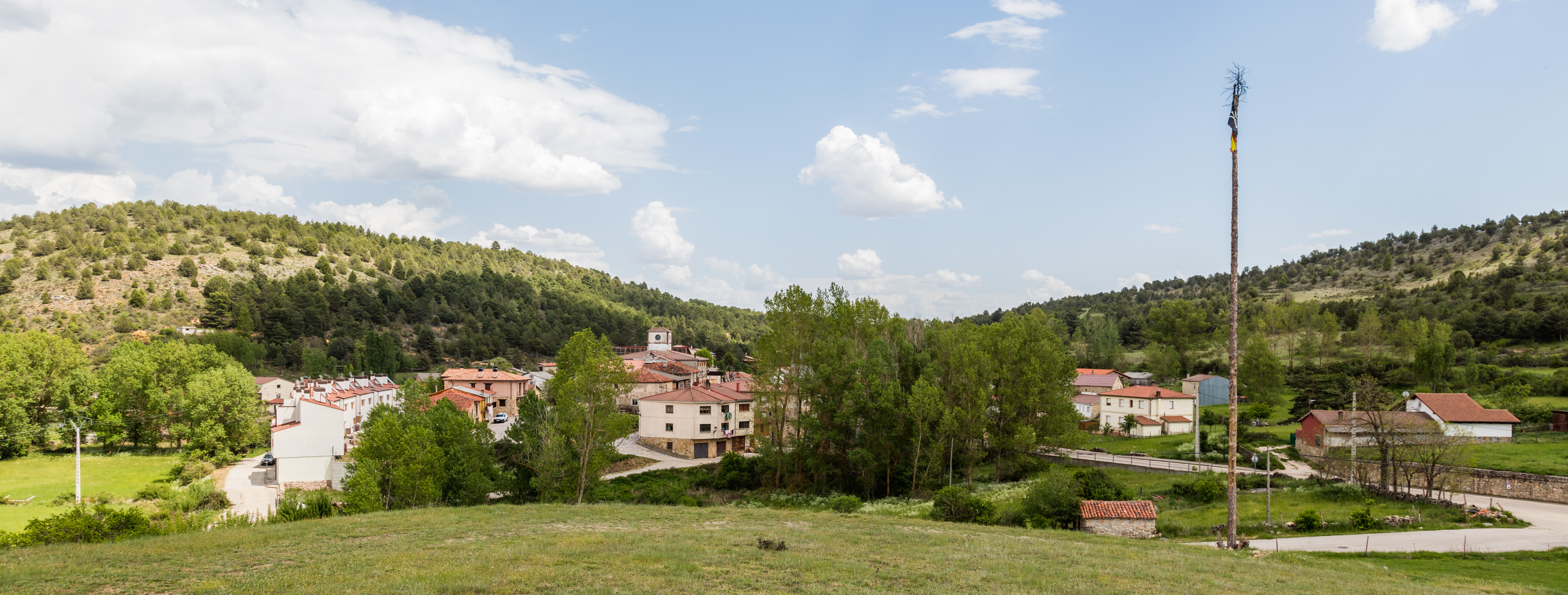

- Location in Spain. Vadillo (Spain)
- Coordinates: 41°47′28″N 3°00′28″W
- Country: Spain
- Autonomous community: Castile and León
- Province: Soria
- Municipality: Vadillo

Area
  - Total: 14 km^{2} (5.4 sq mi)

Population (2025-01-01)
  - Total: 81
  - Density: 5.8/km^{2} (15/sq mi)
- Time zone: UTC+1 (CET)
  - Summer (DST): UTC+2 (CEST)
- Website: Official website

Vadillo is a municipality located in the province of Soria, Castile and León, Spain. According to the 2004 census (INE), the municipality has a population of 137 inhabitants.
