= Mane, Alpes-de-Haute-Provence =

Mane
- Commune
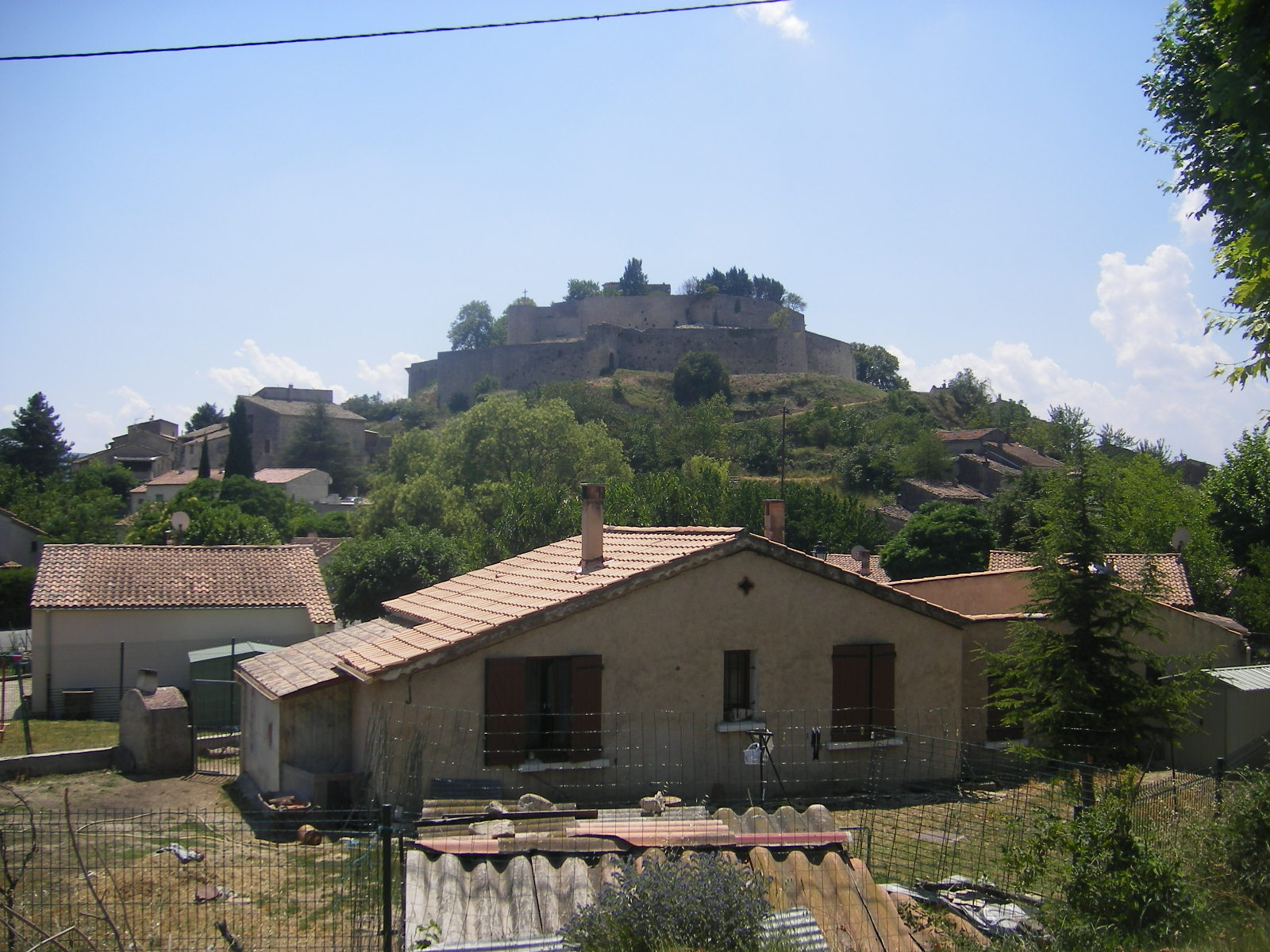
- A general view of the village of Mane

- Coat of arms
- Location of Mane
- Location within France Location within Provence-Alpes-Côte d'Azur
- Coordinates: 43°56′21″N 5°46′06″E
- Country: France
- Region: Provence-Alpes-Côte d'Azur
- Department: Alpes-de-Haute-Provence
- Arrondissement: Forcalquier
- Canton: Reillanne

Government
  - Mayor (2026–32): Jacques Depieds
- Area^{1}: 22 km^{2} (8.5 sq mi)
- Elevation: 500 m (1,600 ft)
- Highest elevation: 868 m (2,848 ft)
- Lowest elevation: 386 m (1,266 ft)
- Population (2023): 1,410
  - Density: 64/km^{2} (170/sq mi)
- Time zone: UTC+01:00 (CET)
  - Summer (DST): UTC+02:00 (CEST)
- INSEE/Postal code: 04111 /04300
- ^{1} French Land Register data, which excludes lakes, ponds, glaciers > 1 km^{2} (0.386 sq mi or 247 acres) and river estuaries.

Mane (French pronunciation: [man]; Occitan: Mana) is a commune in Alpes-de-Haute-Provence department in southeastern France.

It lies near Forcalquier. It was the birthplace of Louis Feuillée and the 18th-century botanist Jean-Paul de Rome d'Ardène. A Minim convent was situated here. The ancient Pont sur Laye is close by the town.

== Population ==
Historical population
Year	Pop.	±% p.a.
1968	852	—
1975	834	−0.30%
1982	943	+1.77%
1990	1,135	+2.34%
1999	1,169	+0.33%
2007	1,350	+1.82%
2012	1,386	+0.53%
2017	1,349	−0.54%
2023	1,410	+0.74%
Source: INSEE

== Twin towns — sister cities ==
Mane is twinned with:

- Chiaverano, Italy (2001)

== See also ==
- Communes of the Alpes-de-Haute-Provence department
