= Anton von Werner =

German painter (1843–1915)

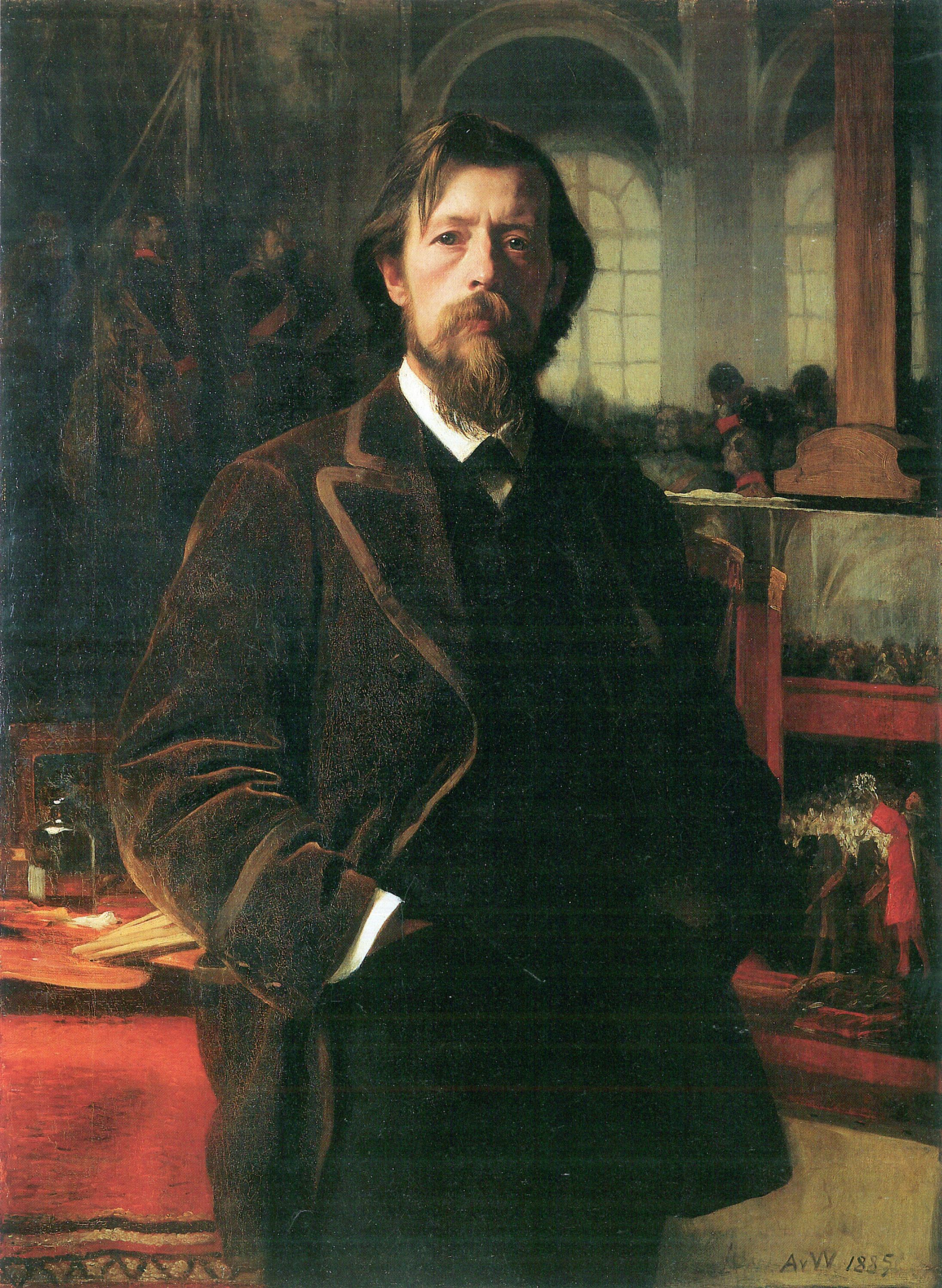
- 1885 self-portrait of Werner
- Born: 9 May 1843; Frankfurt (Oder), Brandenburg, Kingdom of Prussia
- Died: 4 January 1915 (aged 71); Berlin, German Empire
- Education: Academy of Fine Arts, Karlsruhe
- Known for: History painting

Anton Alexander von Werner (9 May 1843 – 4 January 1915) was a German painter and illustrator best known for his depictions of the Franco-Prussian War and unification of Germany which were painted in the Realist style. A member of the Prussian Academy of Arts from 1874 onwards, Werner was a favourite of all the three German Emperors, William I, Frederick III, and Wilhelm II.

== Career ==
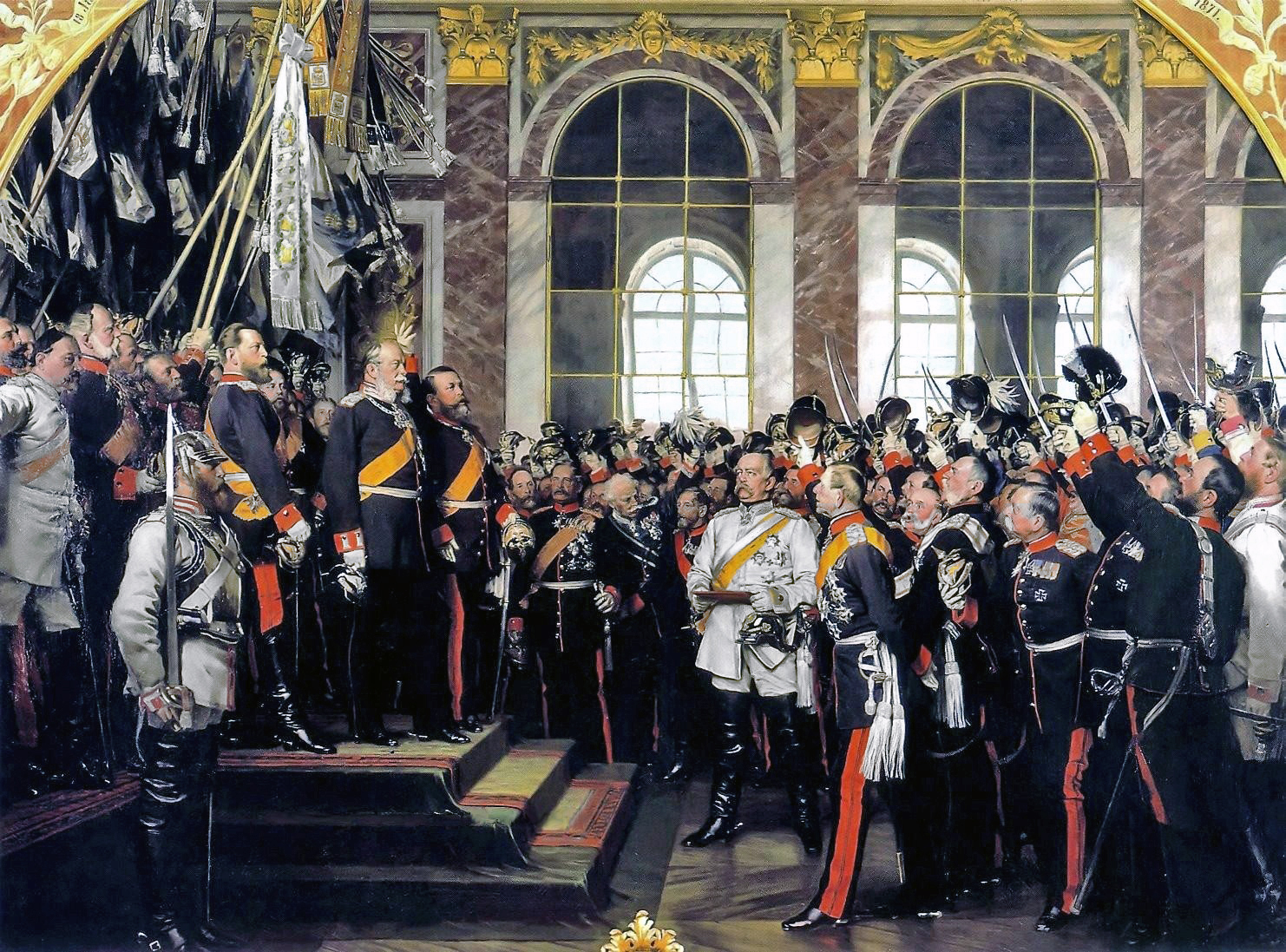
The Proclamation of the German Empire (3rd version; 1885)

Werner was born in Frankfurt (Oder) in the Prussian Province of Brandenburg, the son of a carpenter. His family originally came from East Prussia and was ennobled (von) in 1701. He began an apprenticeship as a decorative painter in 1857 and from 1860 onwards studied painting at the Prussian Academy of Arts in Berlin. One year later, he pursued his studies at the Academy of Fine Arts in Karlsruhe, where he studied with Johann Wilhelm Schirmer, Ludwig des Coudres, Adolf Schroedter, and Karl Friedrich Lessing.

In Karlsruhe, Werner met with artists like Eduard Devrient, Johannes Brahms and Clara Schumann, Paul Heyse, and the Norwegian painter Hans Gude. The author Joseph Victor von Scheffel, who became a close friend, introduced him to Grand Duke Frederick I of Baden, and Werner illustrated several printed editions of Scheffel's works. Werner visited Paris in 1865 and again from March 1867 to July 1868, preparing the International Exposition of 1867. He was strongly influenced by the history paintings of Jean-Auguste-Dominique Ingres, Eugène Delacroix, Ernest Meissonier, and Léon Cogniet whom he also met personally. Having obtained a travelling scholarship upon the exhibition of his early works at the International Exposition, he moved to Italy in 1868 and stayed with Anselm Feuerbach in Rome until November 1869. On his return to Baden, he received several state commissions.

Upon the outbreak of the Franco-Prussian War, Werner was sent with the staff of the 3rd Corps d'Armée under the command of Prince Frederick William of Prussia in October 1870. In January 1871, he was summoned to the Prussian headquarters in Versailles and commissioned to immortalize the proclamation of the German Empire at the Hall of Mirrors. This painting marked Werner's final breakthrough, he became acquainted with numerous German federal princes he portrayed, met with Chancellor Otto von Bismarck and Field Marshal Helmuth von Moltke, as well as with Emperor Wilhelm I. Afterwards he returned to Berlin, now the German capital, and married Malwine Schroedter, daughter of his tutor Adolf Schroedter in August 1871.

In Berlin, Werner designed a large velarium stretching over the Unter den Linden boulevard at the triumphant arrival of the victorious German troops. He received further public commissions to create the mural decorations in the portico of the Victory Column, whereby he used his velarium as a cartoon for an innovative stained glass mosaic. He continued to commemorate the Franco-Prussian War in several commissioned paintings.

In 1873 Werner was appointed professor at the Berlin Academy. His career reached its peak when he became, in 1875, director of the Academy. After 1888, while in William II's court, Werner tutored the emperor to become a painter. In 1909, he succeeded Hugo von Tschudi in directing the Nationalgalerie in Berlin. He died in Berlin in 1915 and was interred at the Alter Zwölf-Apostel-Kirchhof in the Schöneberg neighborhood of Berlin.

== Works ==
Werner's more important works include The Capitulation of Sedan, Proclamation of the German Empire at Versailles, Moltke before Paris, Moltke at Versailles, The Meeting of Bismarck and Napoleon III, Christ and the Tribute Money, William I Visiting the Tombs, The Congress of Berlin, and some decorations executed in mosaic for the Berlin Victory Column. Werner's work is chiefly interesting for the historic value of his pictures of the events of the Franco-Prussian War.

Werner was good friends with Norwegian painter Hans Gude whom he met at the Karlsruhe school, and whom he would later work with at the Berlin Academy. Gude wrote of Werner in 1873,

Even then [Werner] manifested a versatile and rich talent, besides incredible assiduity and capacity for work; he was one of the best on our side. He was also tireless in inventing all sorts of high jinks to amuse us on the Sunday afternoons when the entire group assembled.

— Hans Gude

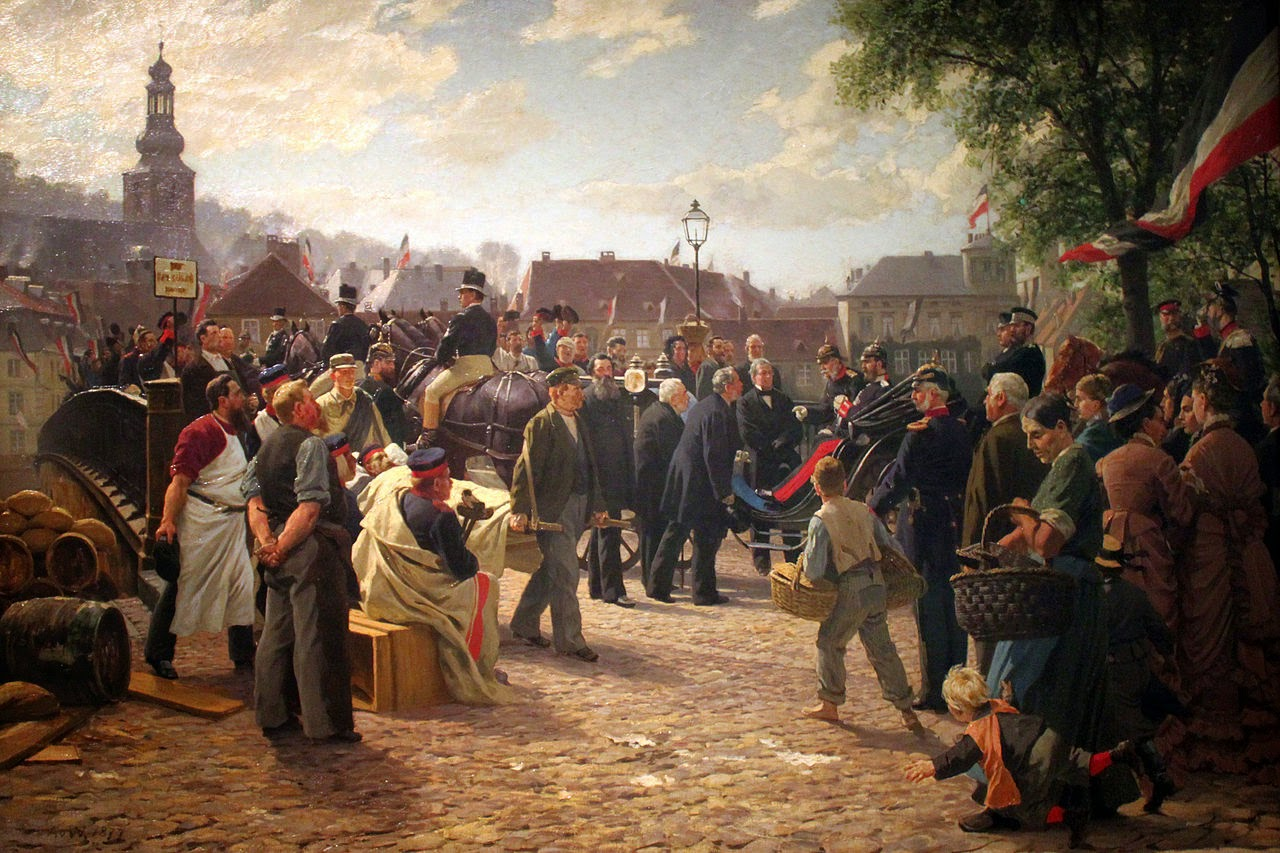
The Arrival of King Wilhelm I in Saarbrücken (1877)

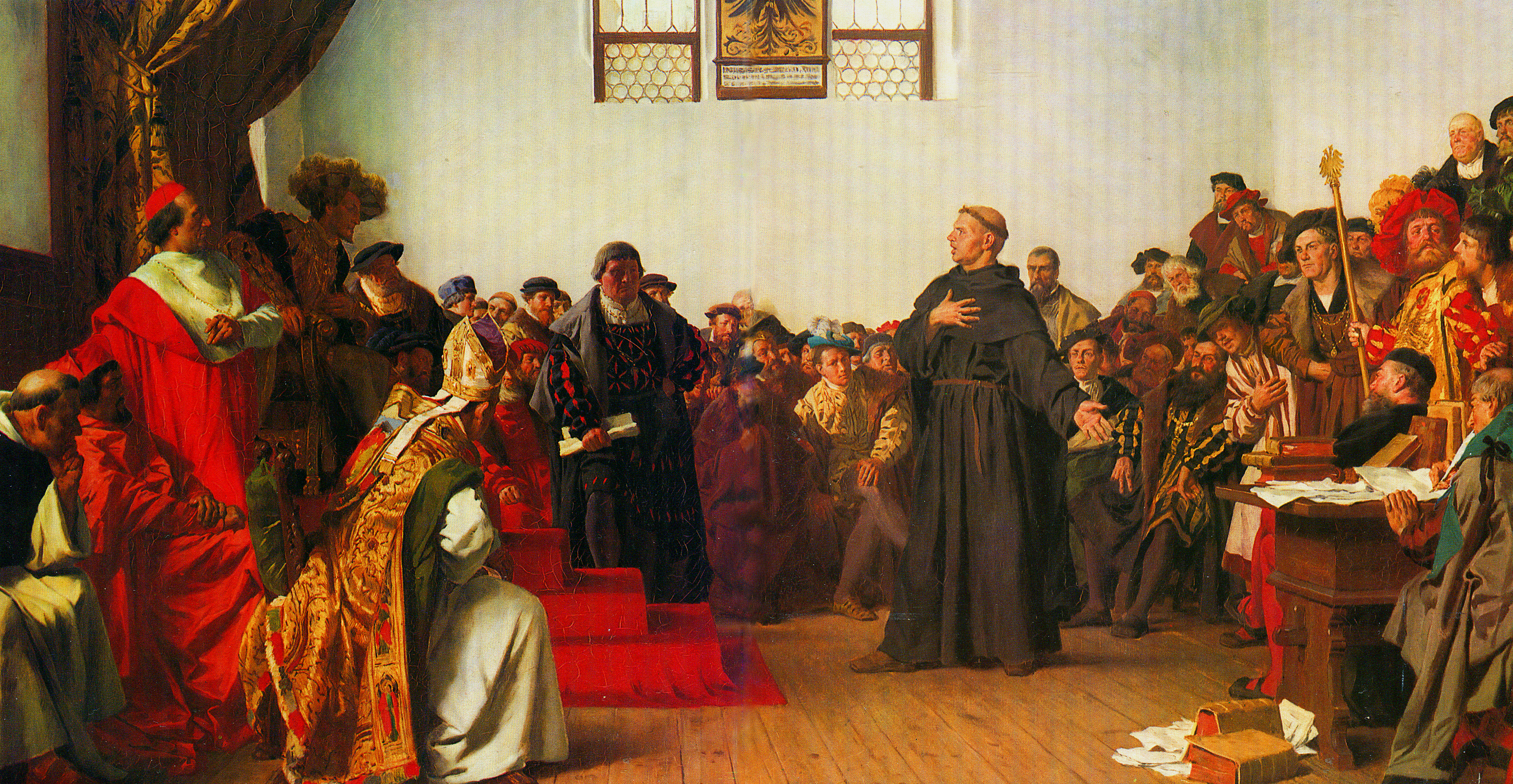
Luther at the Diet of Worms (1877)

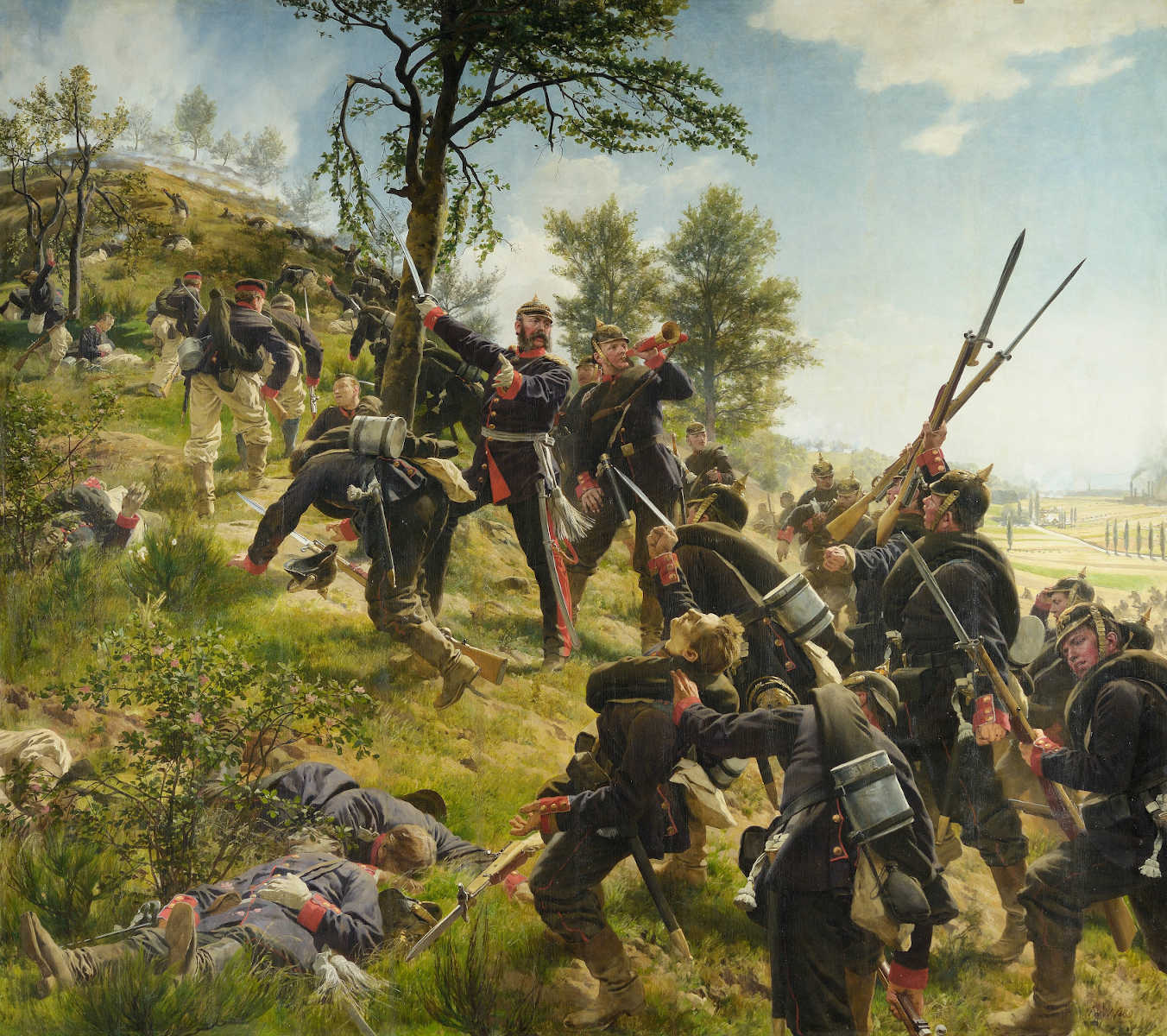
The storming of the Spicheren Heights (1880)

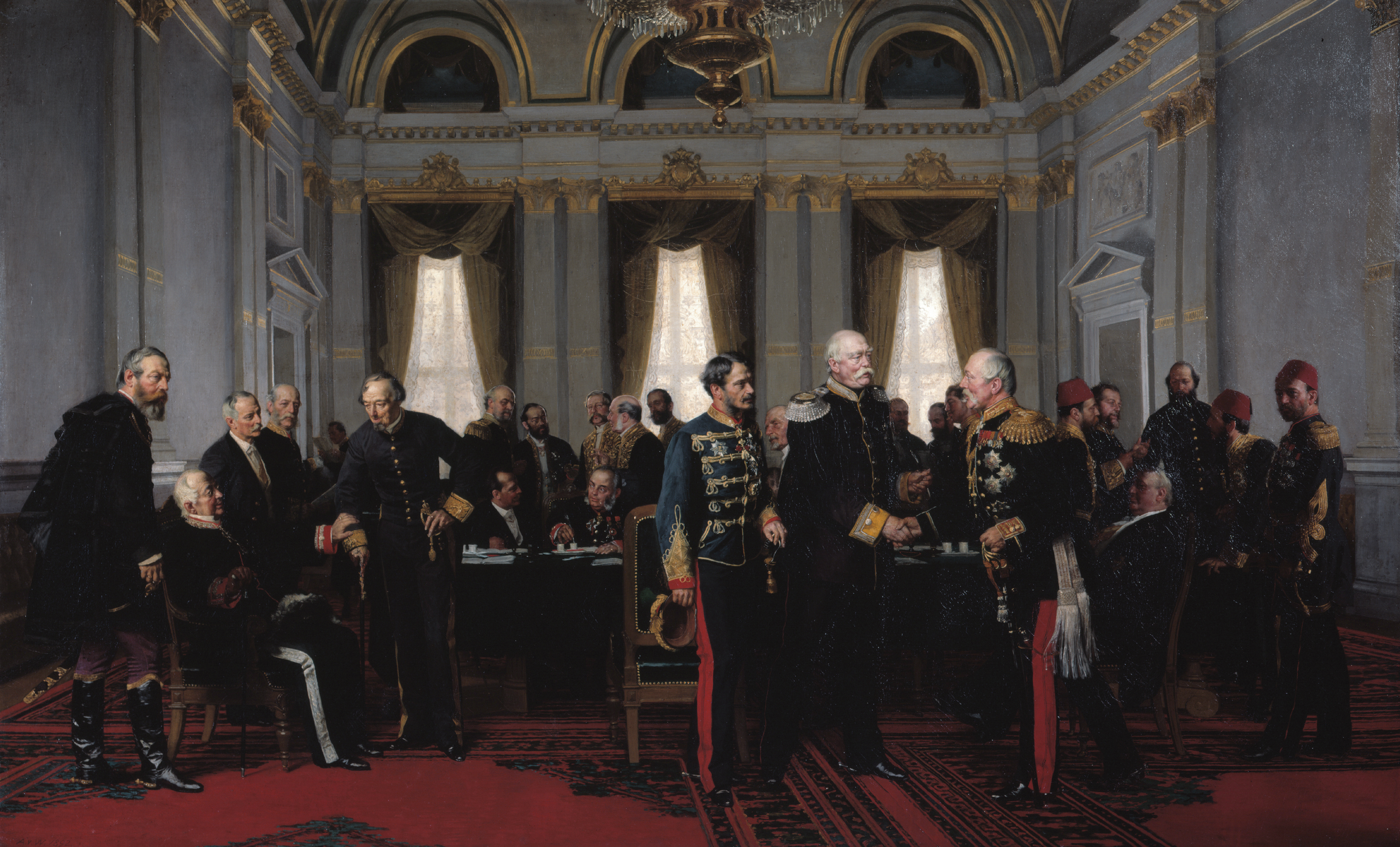
Congress of Berlin, 13 July 1878 (1881)

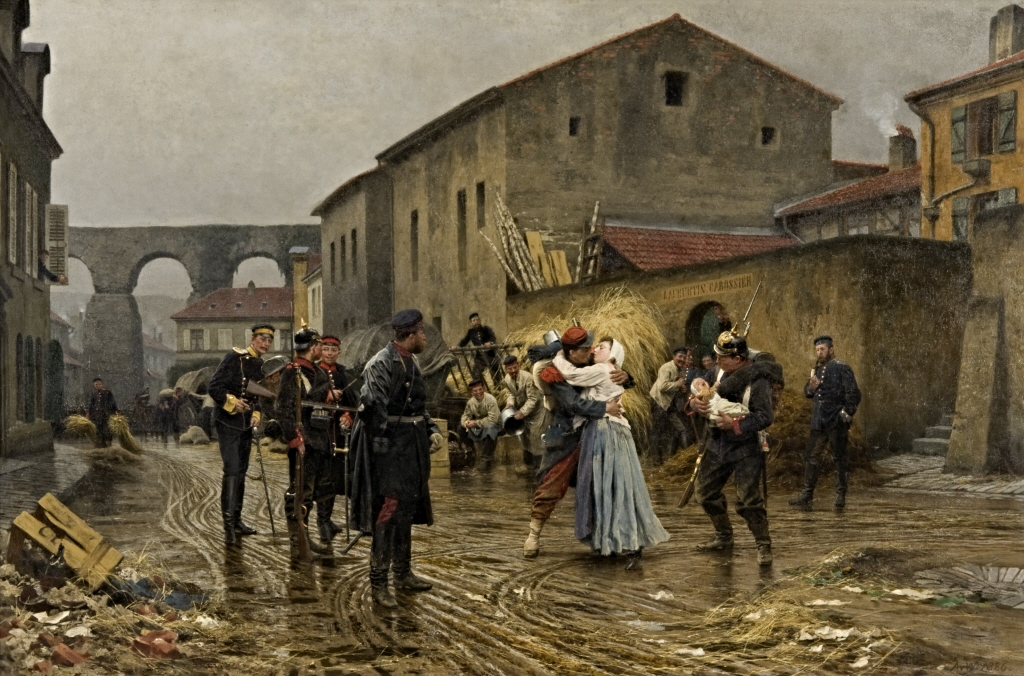
A prisoner of war in Jouy-aux-Arches (1886)

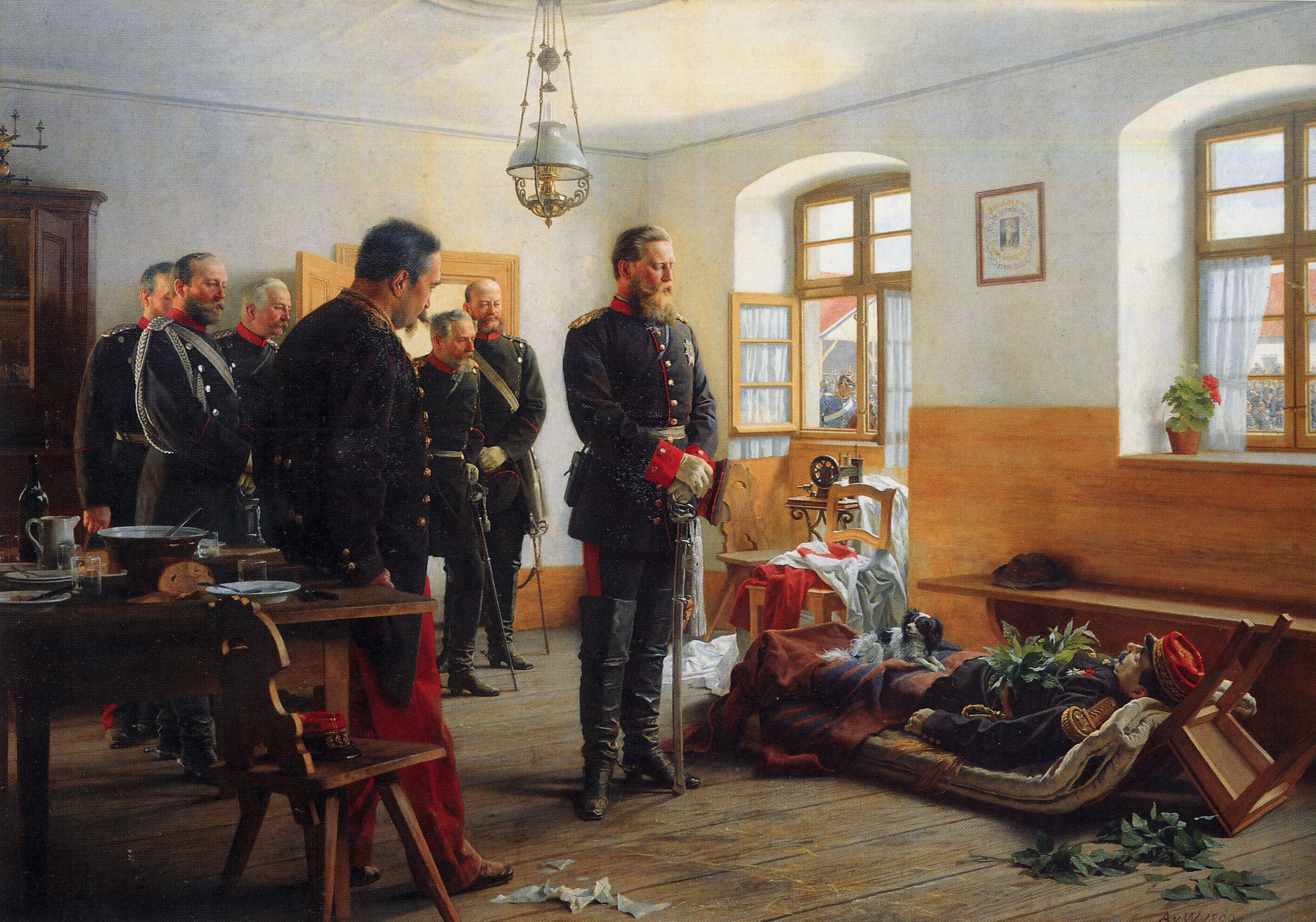
Crown Prince Frederick Wilhelm on the body of General Abel Douay, Weissenburg on 4 August 1870 (1888)

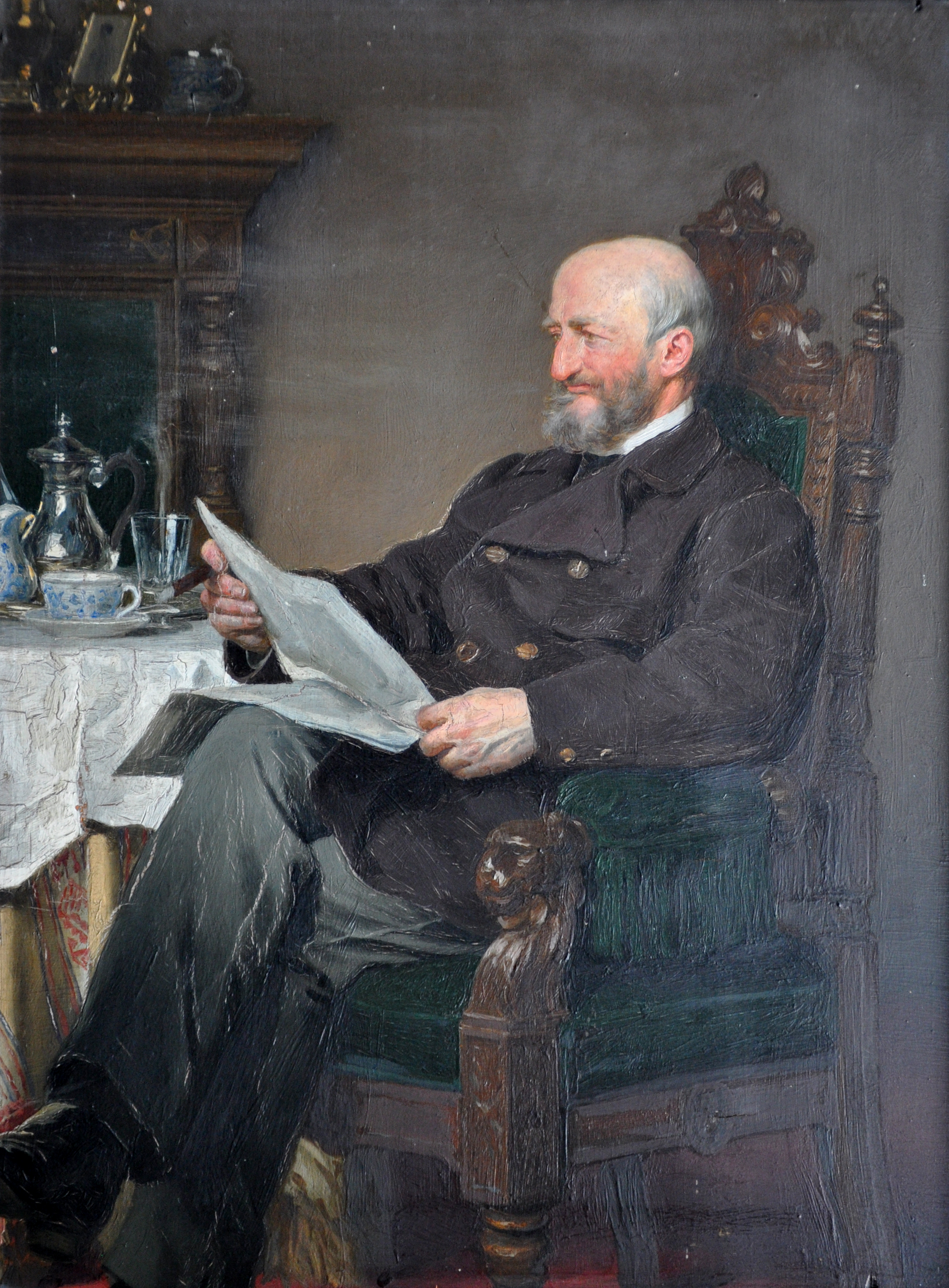
Man with a Newspaper (1893)

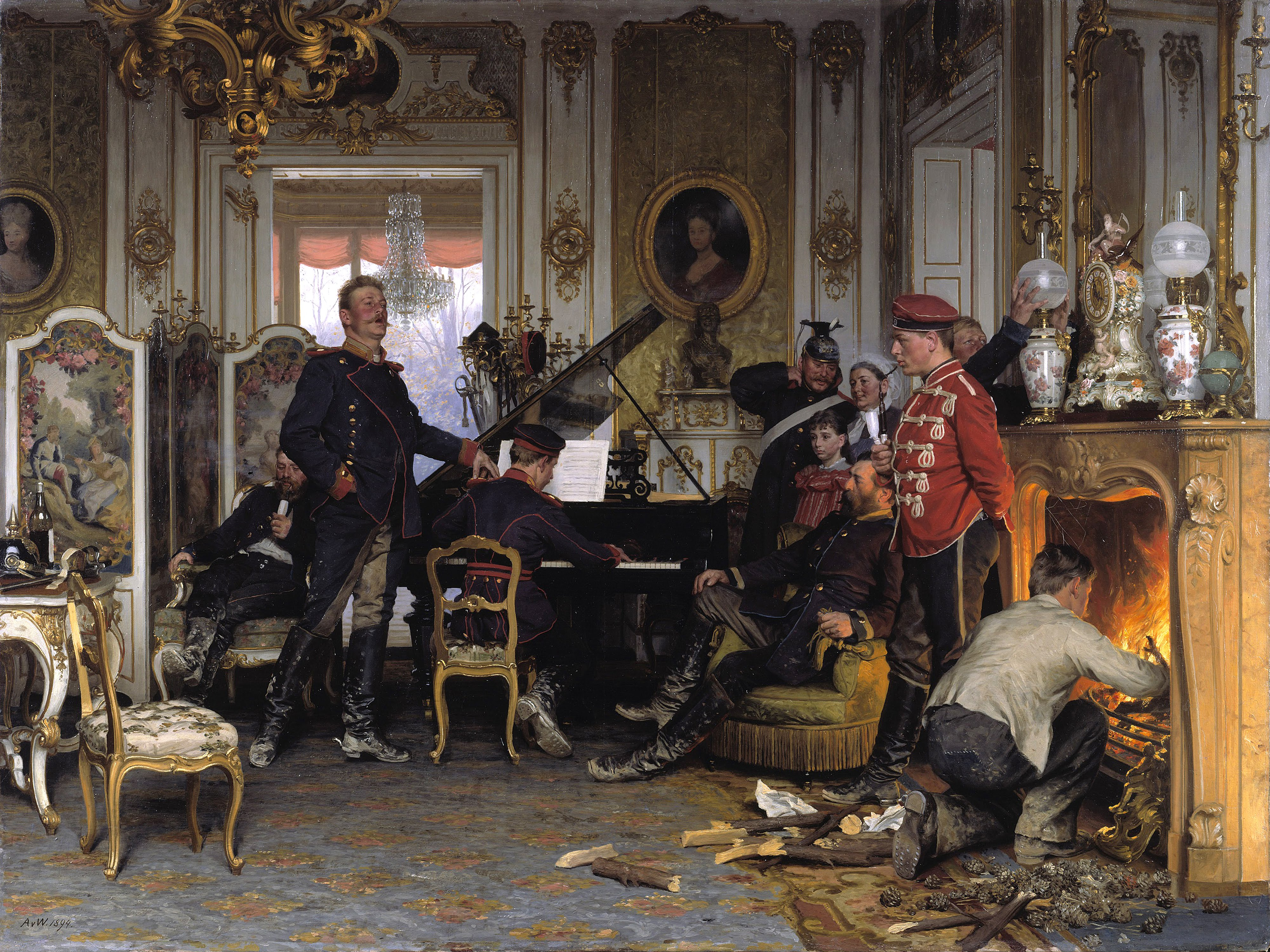
A Billet Outside Paris (1894)

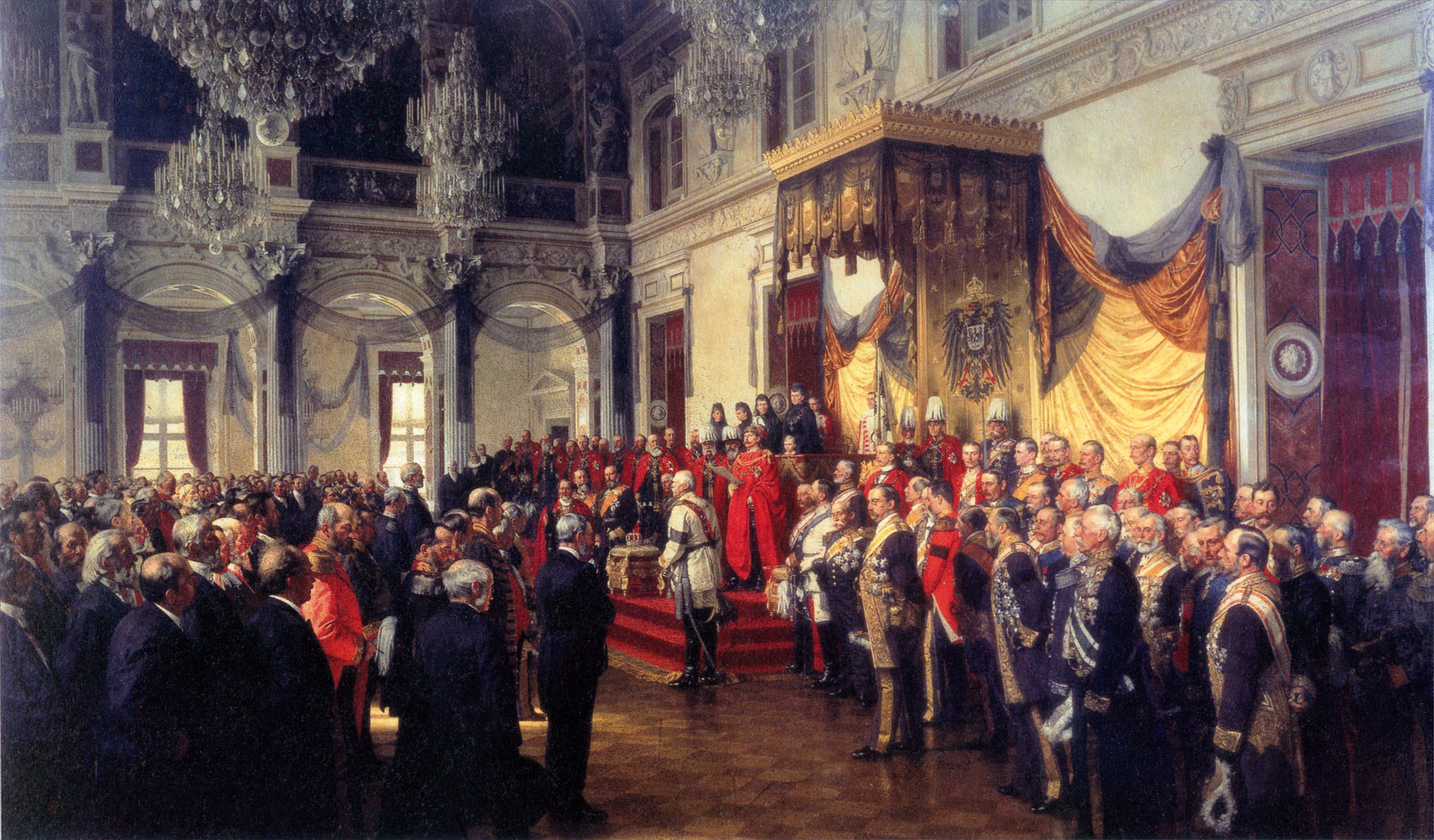
Opening of the Reichstag in the White Hall of Berlin Palace by Wilhelm II (1893)

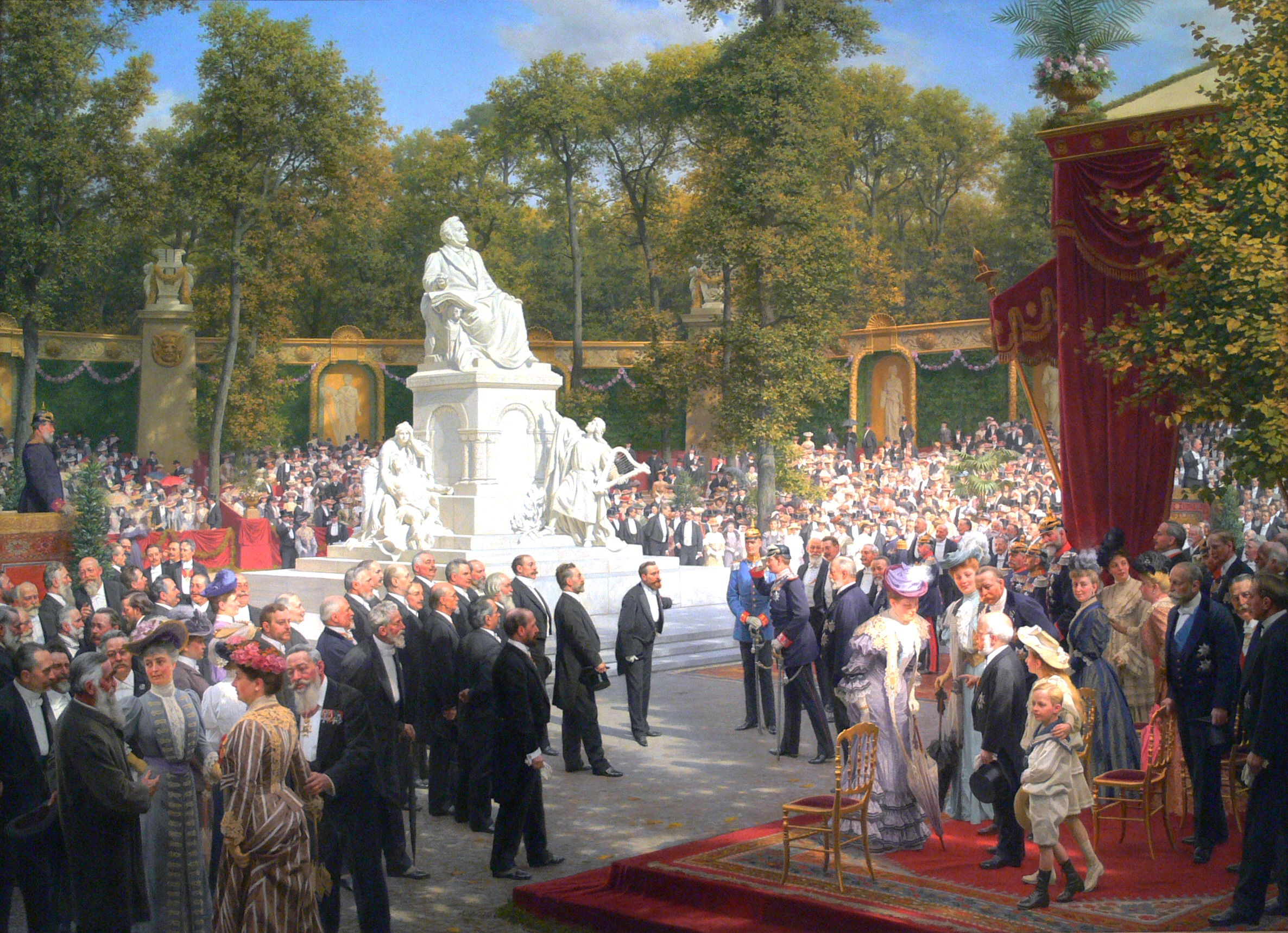
Unveiling of the Richard Wagner Monument in the Tiergarten (1908)

=== Other well-known works ===
- Child's Head in Profile (1864)
- Crouching Boy (1867)
- Allegory of the Origin of German Unity (1872)
- Hussar and An Older Officer (1873)
- The Proclamation of the German Empire (1877)
- Baptism in My House (1879)
- Wilhelm I of Prussia at the sarcophagus of his mother Queen Louise in the Charlottenburg Mausoleum (19 July 1870) (1881)
- Sedan Panorama (1883)
- Empress Gigi (1886)

== Protégés and students ==
One of his students at the Prussian Academy of Arts was Emil Fuchs; another was August von Brandis; also Jacques Bunimowitsch.
