= Roman Theatre of Aspendos =

Roman theatre in Turkey

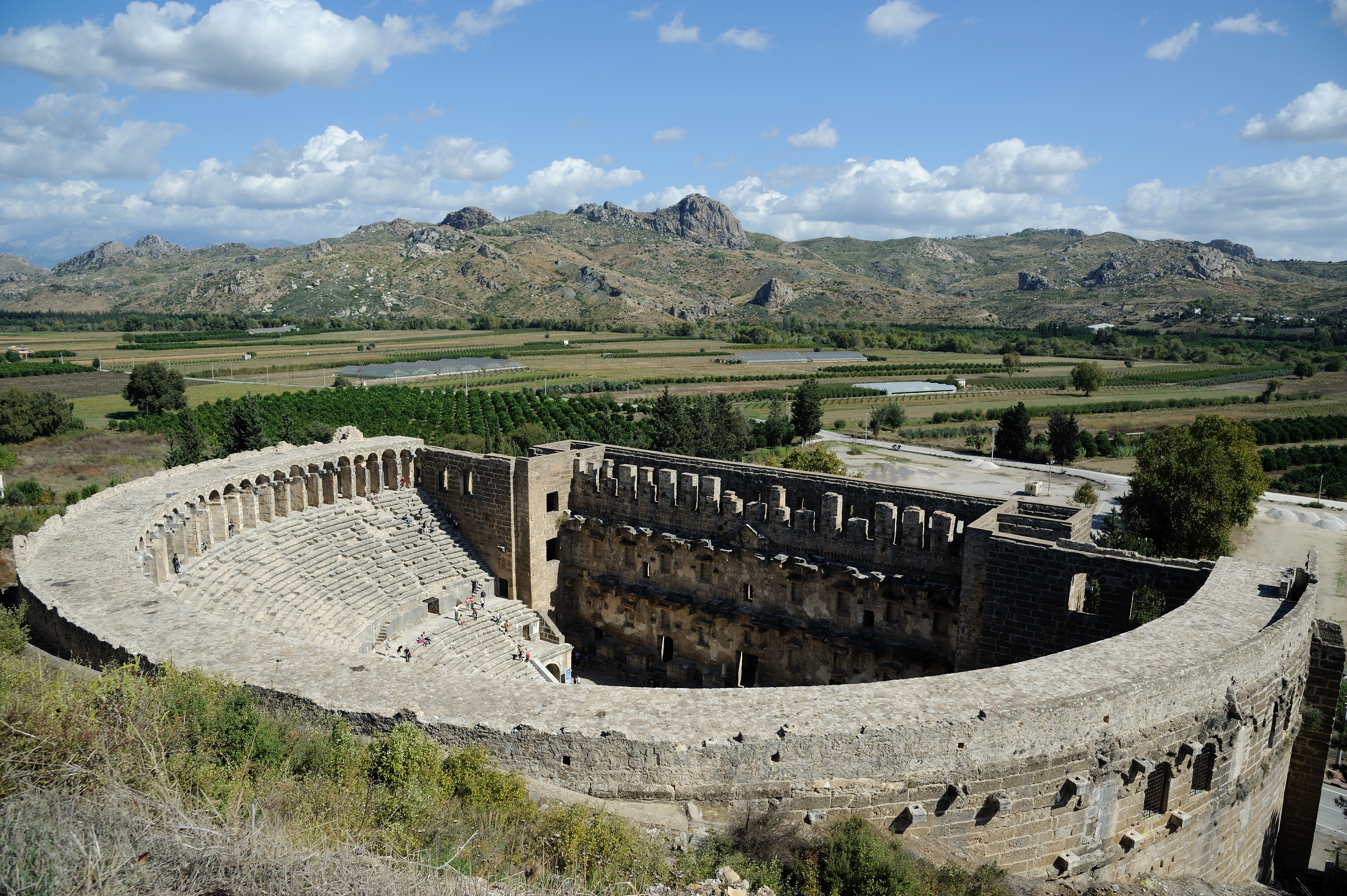
- View of the Roman Theatre of Aspendos in 2011

- Location within Turkey
- 36°56′20″N 31°10′20″E
- Type: Roman theatre
- Periods: Ancient Rome
- Cultures: Roman
- Location: Aspendos, Turkey

History
- Built: 161 a.D - 180 a.D
- Built by: Zenon
- Abandoned: No

Site notes
- Width: 96 metres (315 ft)
- Condition: Almost intact
- Public access: Yes

The Roman theatre of Aspendos is a Roman theatre in the ancient city of Aspendos in Turkey. It was built in the 2nd century and is one of the best preserved ancient theaters of the Greco-Roman world.

== Description ==
With a diameter of 96 metres (314.961ft), the theatre provided seating for 7,000/13,000 people. The theatre was built by the Greek architect Zenon, a native of the city, during the rule of Marcus Aurelius. It was periodically repaired by the Seljuks, who used it as a caravansary, and in the 13th century the stage building was converted into a palace by the Seljuks of Rum. Technically, the structure is a theatre, not an amphitheatre, the latter being fully round or oval shaped.

== History ==
The theater was built during the reign of Marcus Aurelius (161-180). An inscription lists the brothers Curtius Crispinus and Curtius Auspicatus as commissioners and Zenon as architect. The cavea is partly built against the slope of the hill, which provides a natural foundation. The rest of the stand rests on stone arcades. The cavea has 41 rows of benches, providing seating for 12,000 spectators. The stage wall is completely intact, only the original eight-meter-deep wooden ceiling has disappeared. Around the theater, 58 holes have been found where there used to be poles, which could be used to stretch a large velarium over the grandstand to protect the spectators from the sun.

In the 13th century, the stage building was converted into a palace for the Seljuks.

In modern times, the theater has been restored to its original state. It is an important tourist attraction for the region. In spring and summer, opera and ballet performances are held there.

== See also ==
- Greco-Roman world
- Aspendos
