= Aspendos =

Ancient Greco-Roman city

- Ἄσπενδος (Ancient Greek)
- Aspendus
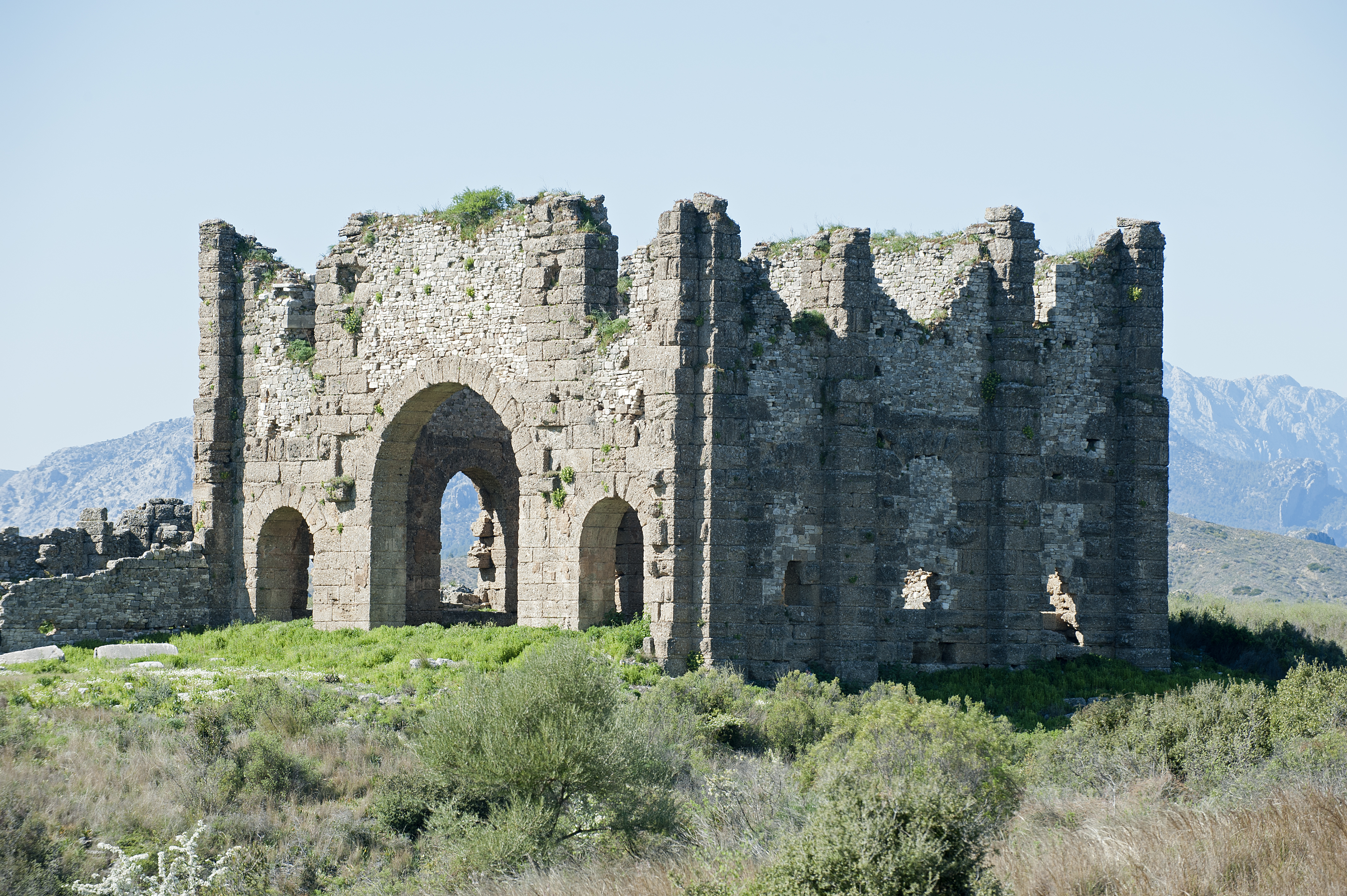
- The Roman Basilica at Aspendos, 2011

- Location within Turkey
- 36°56′20″N 31°10′20″E
- Type: Settlement
- Location: Serik, Antalya Province, Turkey
- Region: Pamphylia

Aspendos or Aspendus (Attic: Ἄσπενδος; Pamphylian: Εστϝεδυς) was an ancient Greco-Roman city in Antalya province of Turkey. The site is located 40 km east of the modern city of Antalya.

It was situated on the Eurymedon River about 16 km inland from the Mediterranean Sea; it shared a border with, and was hostile to, the ancient city of Side.

== Foundation ==
Ancient authors preserve different traditions concerning the foundation of Aspendos. Some traditions state that the city was founded by an eponymous figure named Aspendos, others attribute its foundation to the Argives, while yet others associate it with the heroes Polypoetes and Leonteus, who led the Lapith contingent from Thessaly during the Trojan War.

== History ==
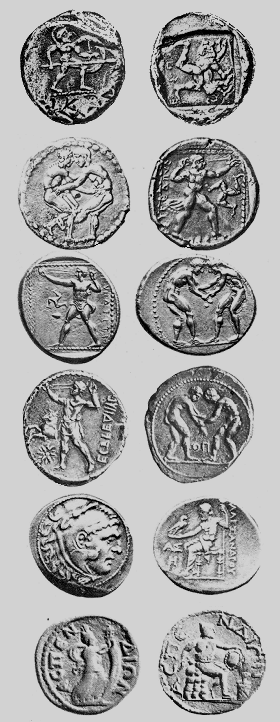
Coins of Aspendos

The wide range of its coinage throughout the ancient world indicates that, in the 5th century BC, Aspendos had become the most important city in Pamphylia. At that time, according to Thucydides, the Eurymedon River was navigable as far as Aspendos, and the city derived great wealth from a trade in salt, oil and wool.

Aspendos did not play an important role in antiquity as a political force. Its political history during the colonisation period corresponded to the currents of the Pamphylian region. Within this trend, after the colonial period, it remained for a time under Lycian hegemony.

=== Persian period ===
In 546 BC, it came under Persian domination. The fact that the city continued to mint coins in its own name, however, indicates that it had a great deal of freedom even under the Persians.

Circa 465 BC, Cimon led an Athenian navy against a Persian navy in the Battle of the Eurymedon, and destroyed it. Aspendos then became a member of the Delian League.

The Persians captured the city again in 411 BC and used it as a base. In 389 BC, Thrasybulus of Athens, in an effort to regain some of the prestige that city had lost in the Peloponnesian Wars, anchored off the coast of Aspendos in an effort to secure its surrender. Hoping to avoid a new war, the people of Aspendos collected money among themselves and gave it to the commander, entreating him to retreat without causing any damage. Even though he took the money, he had his men trample all the crops in the fields. Enraged, the Aspendians stabbed and killed Thrasybulus in his tent.

=== Hellenistic period ===
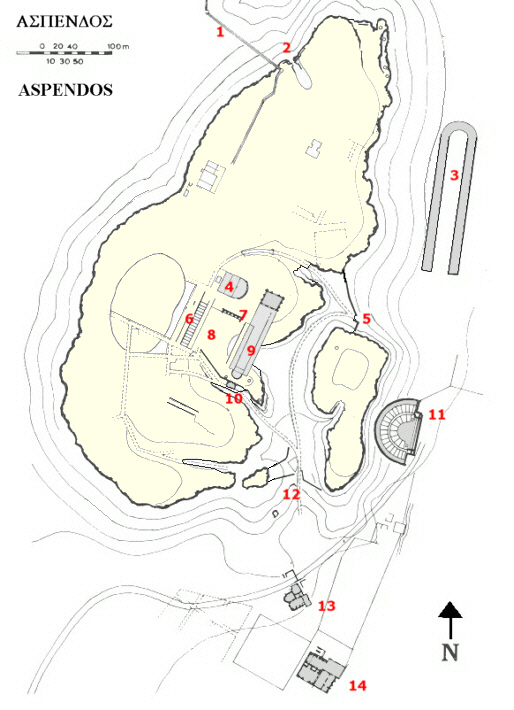
Plan of Aspendos

When Alexander the Great marched into Aspendos in 333 BC after capturing Perge, the citizens sent envoys asking him not to garrison soldiers there. He agreed, provided he would be given the taxes and horses that they had formerly paid as tribute to the Persian king. After reaching this agreement Alexander went to Side, leaving a garrison there on the city's surrender. Going back through Sillyon, he learned that the Aspendians had failed to ratify the agreement their envoys had proposed and were preparing to defend themselves. Alexander marched to the city immediately. When they saw Alexander returning with his troops, the Aspendians, who had retreated to their Acropolis, again sent envoys to sue for peace. This time, however, they had to agree to very harsh terms; a Macedonian garrison would remain in the city and 100 silver talents as well as the horses previously agreed would be given in tax annually.

=== Roman period ===
In 190 BC, the city surrendered to the Romans, and the corrupt magistrate Verres later pillaged its art treasures. It was ranked by Philostratus the third city of Pamphylia, and in Byzantine times seems to have been known as Primopolis. Toward the end of the Roman period the city began a decline that continued throughout Byzantine times, although in medieval times it was evidently still a strong place.

Diogenes Laërtius writes that there was a native of Aspendos called Demetrius, who was a pupil of Apollonius of Soli. In addition, he mentions Diodorus of Aspendus.

== Greek and Roman structures ==
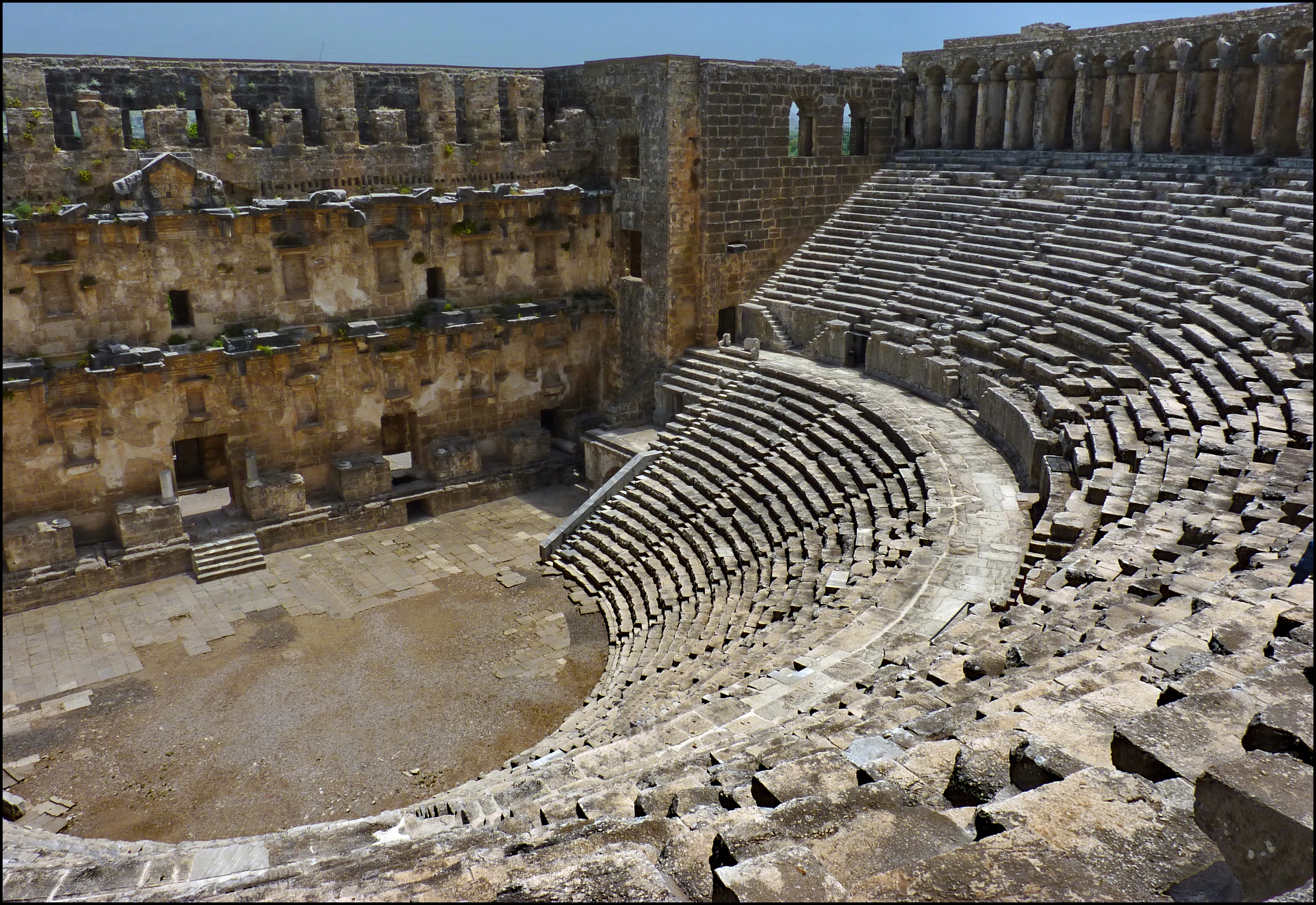
The Roman Theatre of Aspendos

Aspendos is known for having the best-preserved theatre of antiquity, the Roman Theatre of Aspendos. With a diameter of 96 metres (315 ft), it provided seating for 7,000 but the recent Aspendus Culture and Film Festival has shown that it can hold over 20,000. It was built in 155 by the Greek architect Zenon, a native of the city. It was periodically repaired by the Seljuqs, who used it as a caravanserai, and in the 13th century the stage building was converted into a palace by the Seljuqs of Rum.

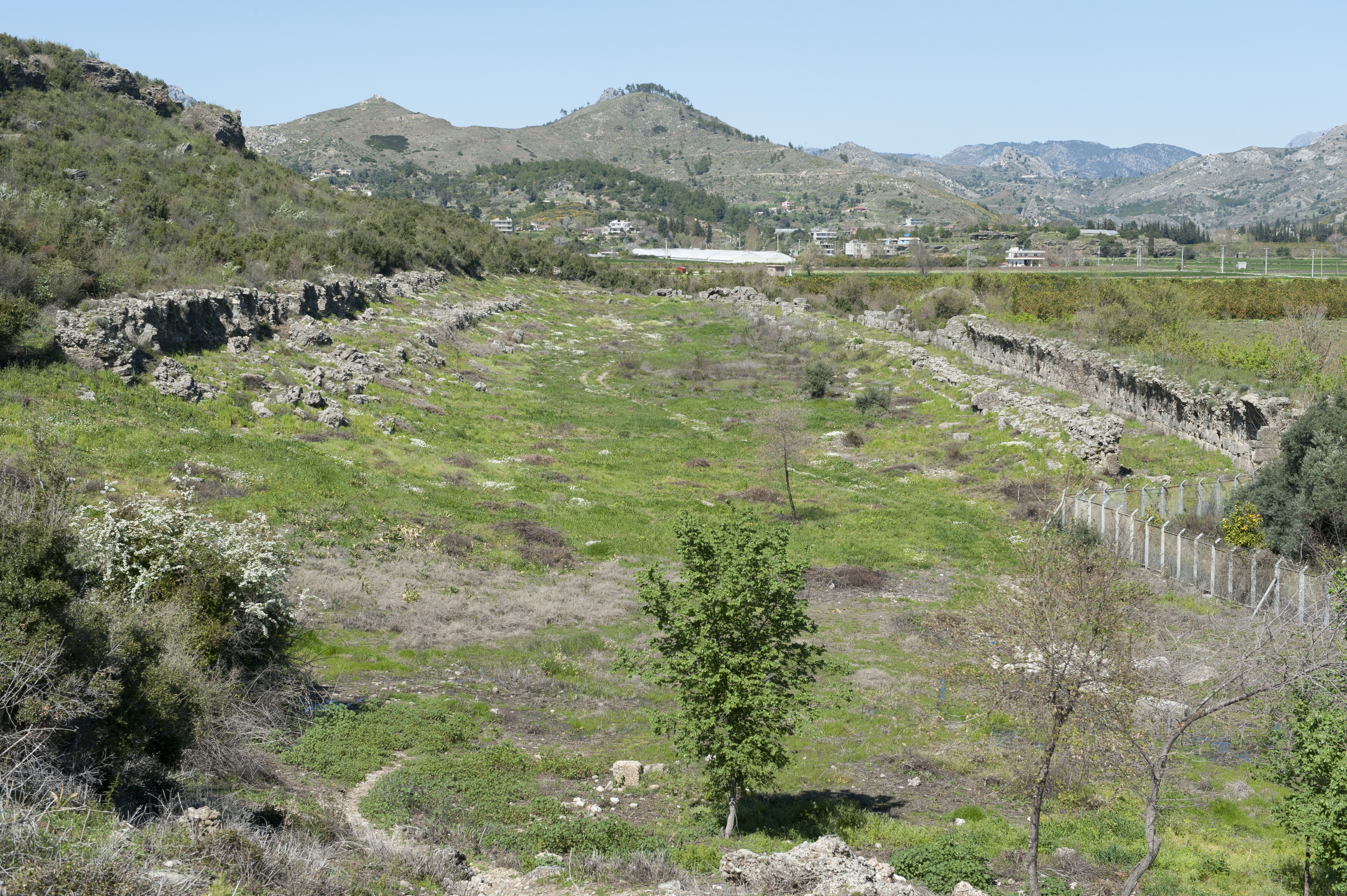
The Stadium

As was usual to minimise construction complexity and cost, part of the theatre was built against the hill where the Citadel (Acropolis) stood, while the remainder was built on vaulted arches. The high stage, whose supporting columns are still in place, served to seemingly isolate the audience from the rest of the world. The scaenae frons, or backdrop, has remained intact. The 8.1 metre (27 ft) sloping reflective wooden ceiling over the stage has been lost over time. Post holes for 58 masts are found in the upper level of the theatre. These masts supported a velarium or awning that could be pulled over the audience to provide shade. The diameter of the orchestra is 23.9 m and the height of the columnatio (stage backdrop) was 15.7 m.

The unique 19 km-long Roman aqueduct is possibly the most important monument, since the last 2 km of the conduit is a well-preserved inverted siphon, rather than an open channel, which made this aqueduct famous. The siphon allowed shorter arches to be constructed at the expense of finding a way to contain the water pressure in the siphon in an era when large diameter piping was difficult to seal.

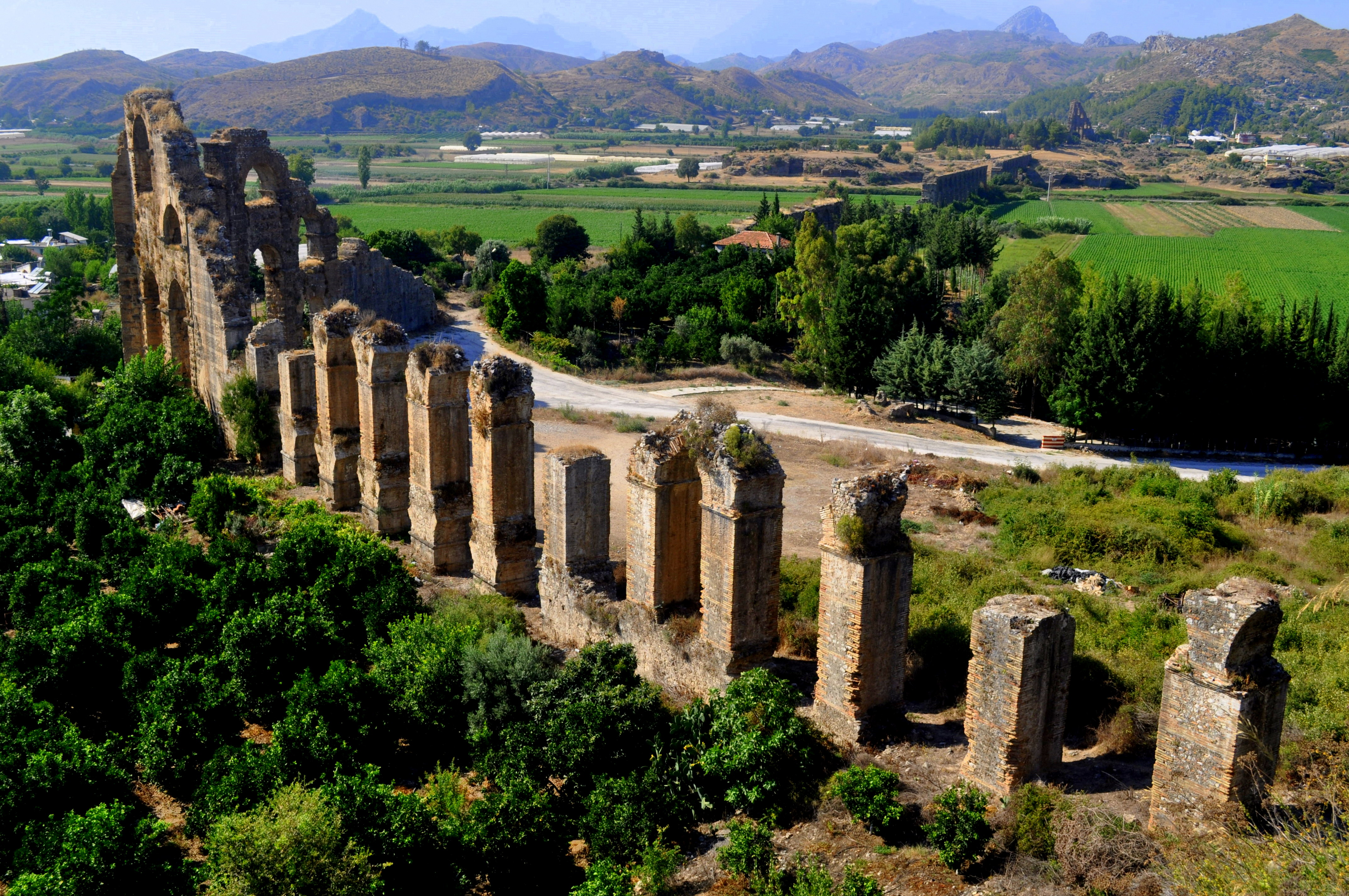
Roman aqueduct and siphon

The siphon was split into three bridge sections 592, 924 and 154 m long, separated by 5.5 m square two towers where the aqueduct bends and where the water ascended and descended and which are today still 30 m high. The siphon was built on arches to cross the marshy valley between the hills and the town. The central section consisted of 46 arches up to 15 m high, 29 of which are still standing. The siphon was 40 m deep between the towers leading to a pressure of 400kPa (4bar) in the pipes and delivered about 5600 m^{3} per day. The pipes were carved blocks of limestone carefully fitted together to ensure a good seal using a mortar of lime and olive oil which expands when wet. It was built between the middle of the 2nd and end of the 3rd century. An inscription states Tiberius Claudius Italicus spent 2 million denarii to build an aqueduct here.

On the agora of Aspendos, three buildings are still visible today: a Bouleuterion/Ekklesiasterion (previously interpreted as Odeon), a market building and a Stoa, the so-called "Western hall". Nearby stand the remains of a stadium, baths, basilica and nymphaeum. The Roman Eurymedon Bridge, reconstructed in the 13th century, is also in the vicinity.

== Coinage ==
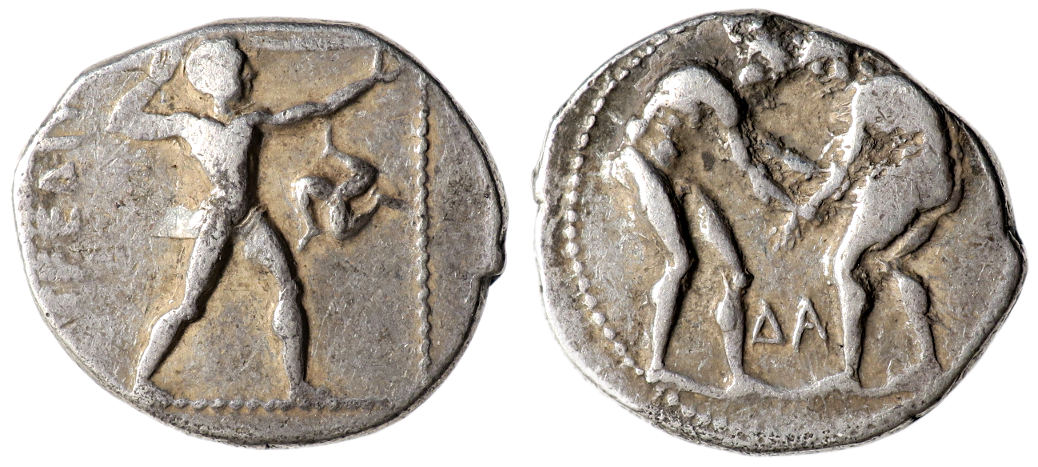
Silver stater from Aspendos dated 370–333 BC. Obverse: Olympic games-type scene: two wrestlers grappling, the letters delta and alpha between their legs; Reverse: Slinger, wearing short chiton, discharging sling to right, triskeles on right with feet clockwise; Size: 23.6mm

Aspendos was one of the earliest cities to mint coins. It began issuing coinage around 500 BC, first staters and later drachmas; "the slinger on the obverse represents the soldiery for which Aspendus was famous in antiquity," the reverse frequently depicts a triskelion. The legend appears on early coins as the abbreviation ΕΣ or ΕΣΤϜΕ; later coinage has ΕΣΤϜΕΔΙΙΥΣ, the adjective from the city's local (Pamphylian) name Estwedus. The city's numismatic history extends from archaic Greek to late Roman times.

== Bishopric ==
The Christian bishopric of Aspendus was a suffragan of the metropolitan see of Side, the capital of the Roman province of Pamphylia Prima, to which Aspendus belonged. Of its bishops, the names of four are recorded in extant documents: Domnus was at the First Council of Nicaea in 325, Tribonianus at the Council of Ephesus in 431, Timotheus at the 448 synod held by Flavian of Constantinople, which condemned Eutyches, and at the Robber Council of Ephesus held the same year, and Leo at the Second Council of Nicaea in 787.

No longer a residential bishopric, Aspendus is today listed by the Catholic Church as a titular see.

== Aspendos International Opera and Ballet Festival ==
The theatre hosts the annual Aspendos International Opera and Ballet Festival organized by Turkish State Opera and Ballet since 1994, with international participation of opera and ballet companies and an audience of about 10,000.

Dalida held her last concert there on 28 April 1987.

== Gallery ==
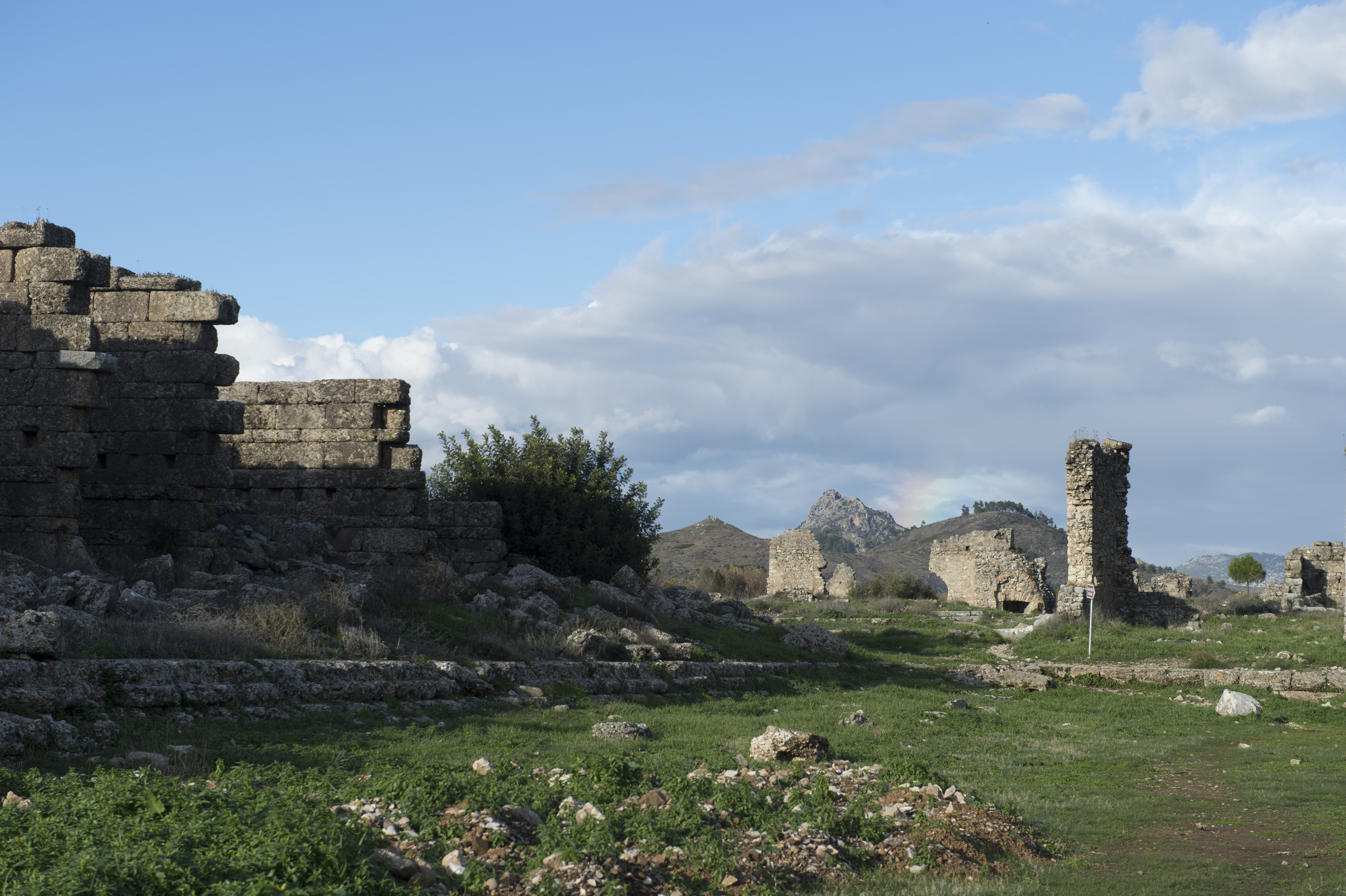
Aspendos Agora and Market Hall

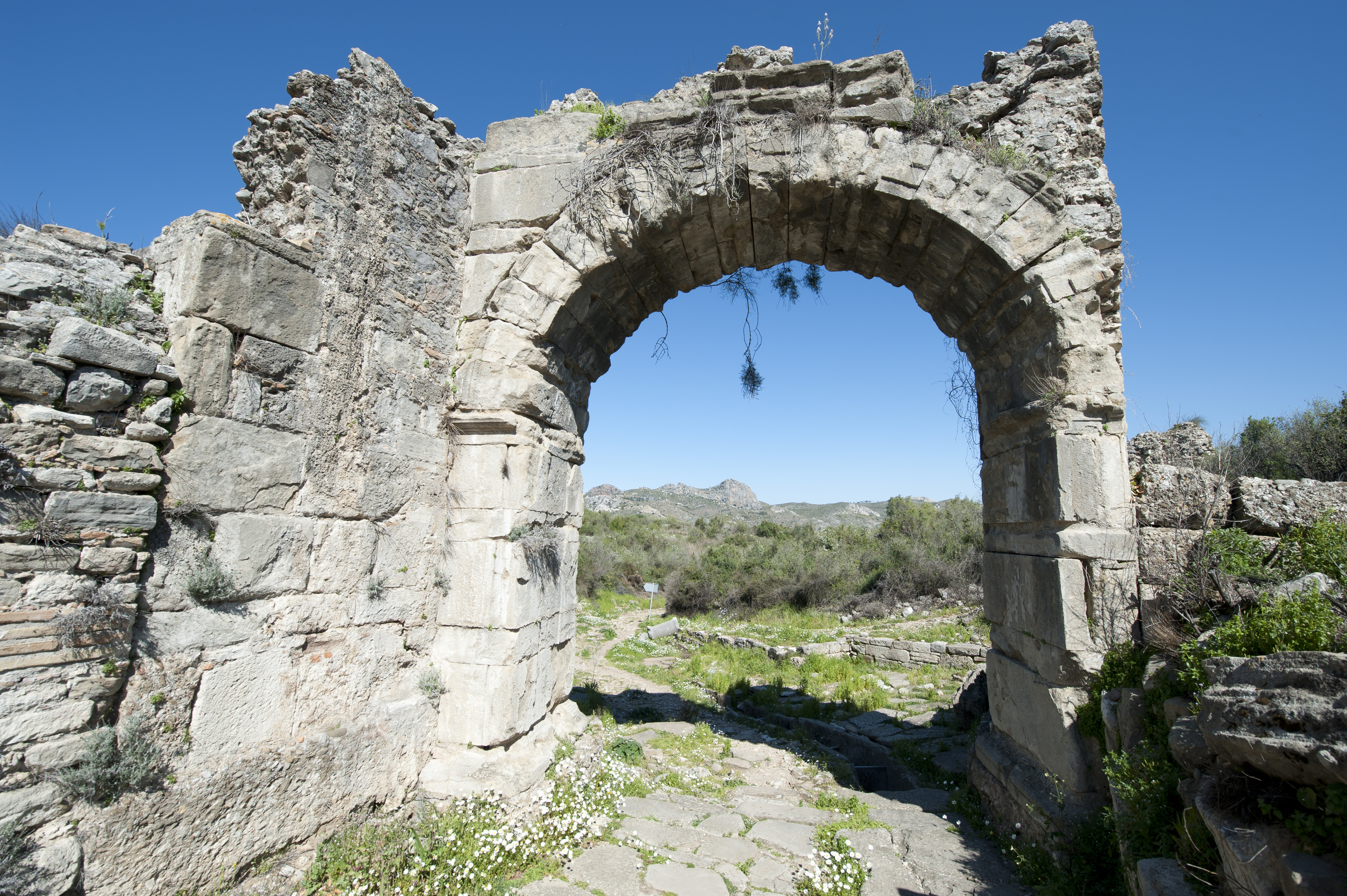
The Ornamental Gate

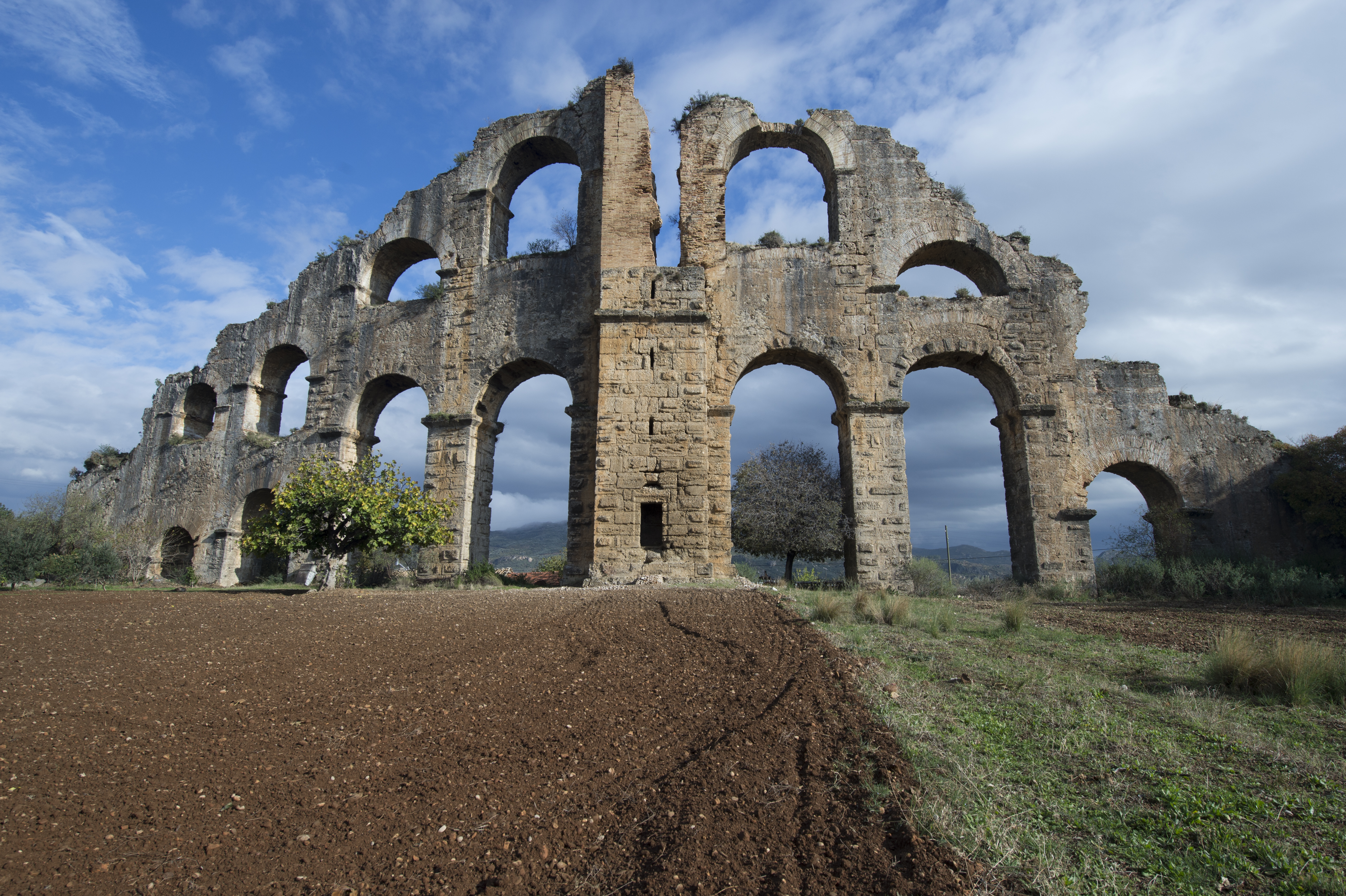
Roman aqueduct of Aspendos

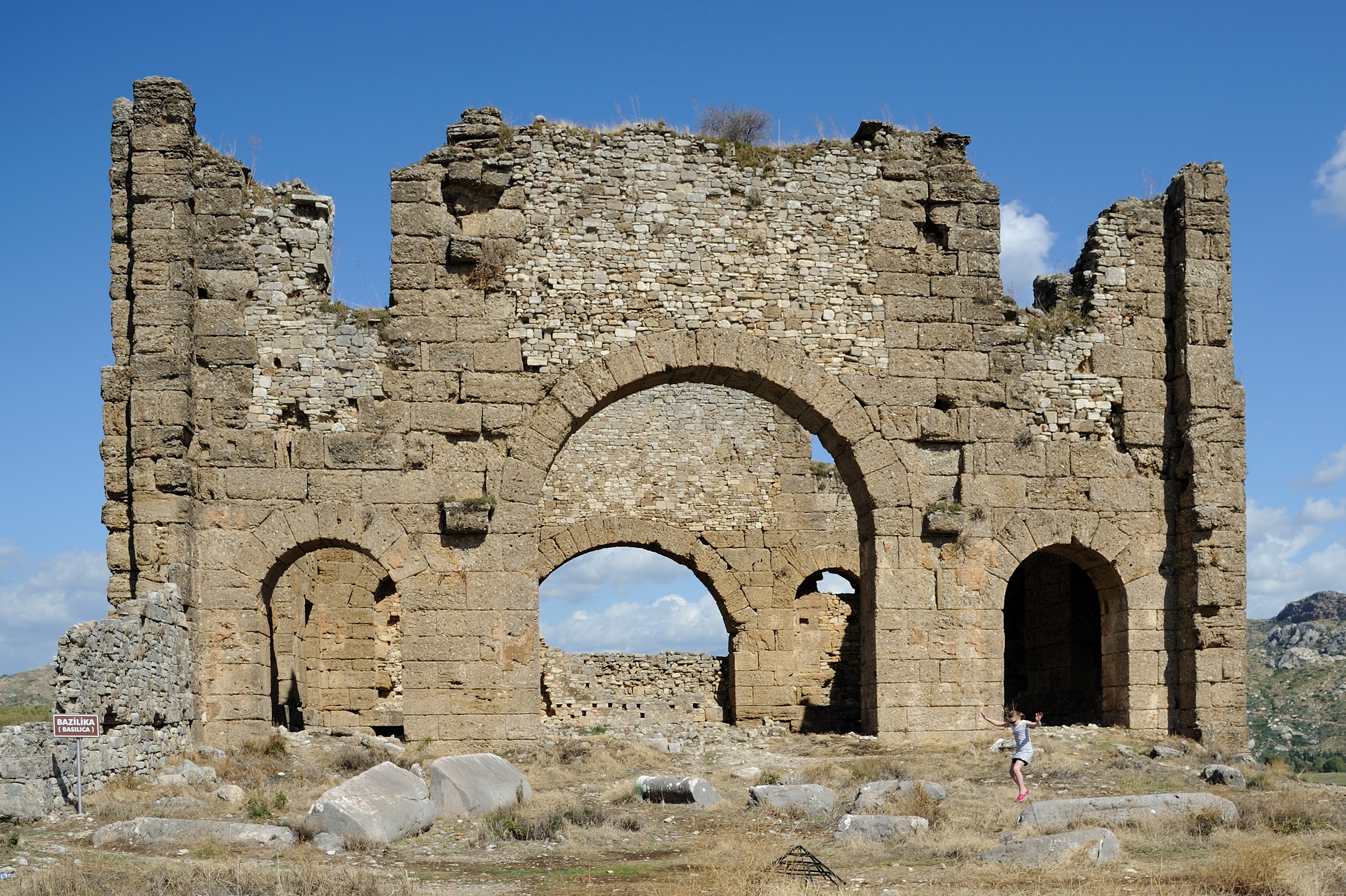
The Basilica

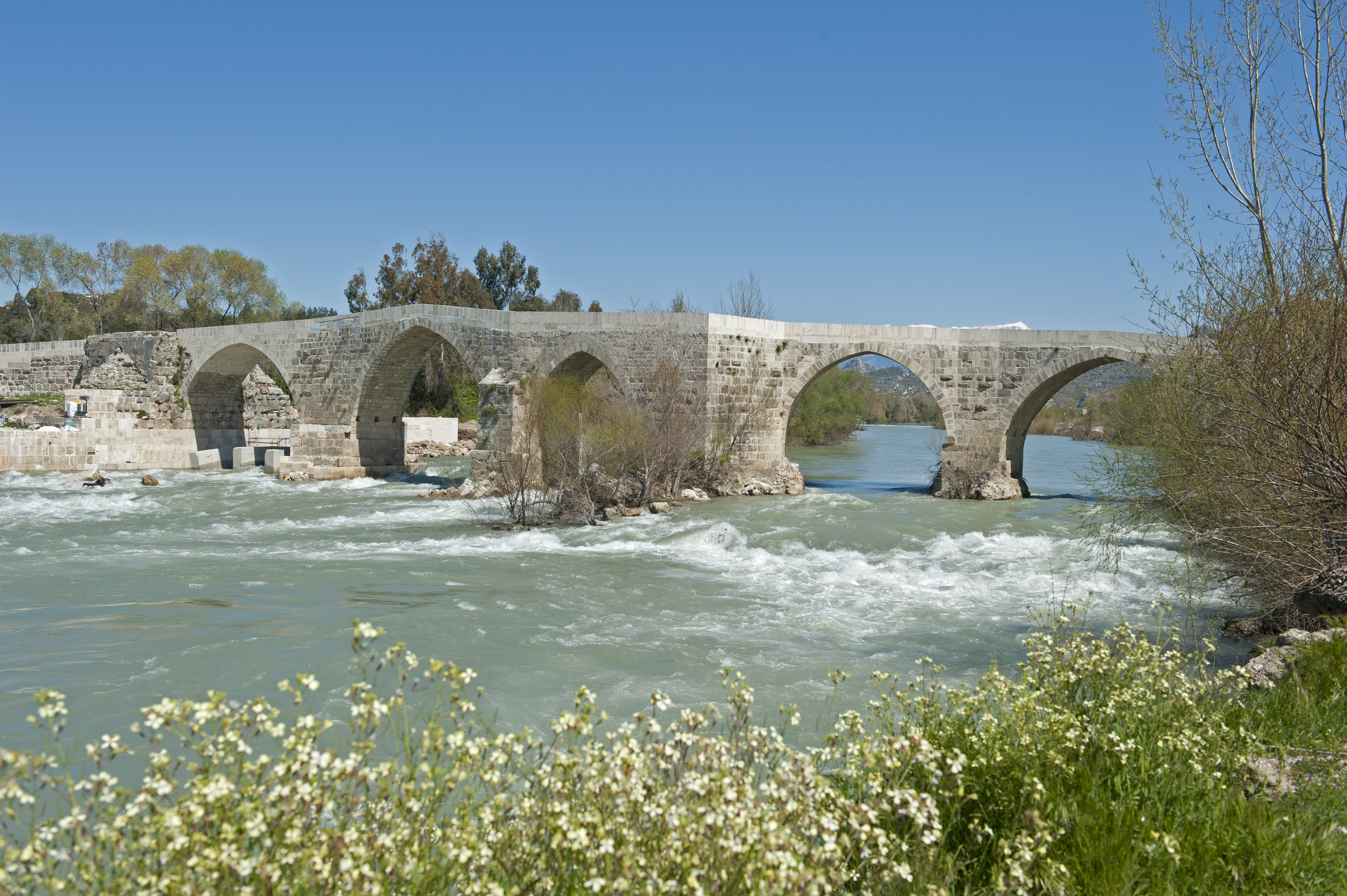
The Eurymedon Bridge

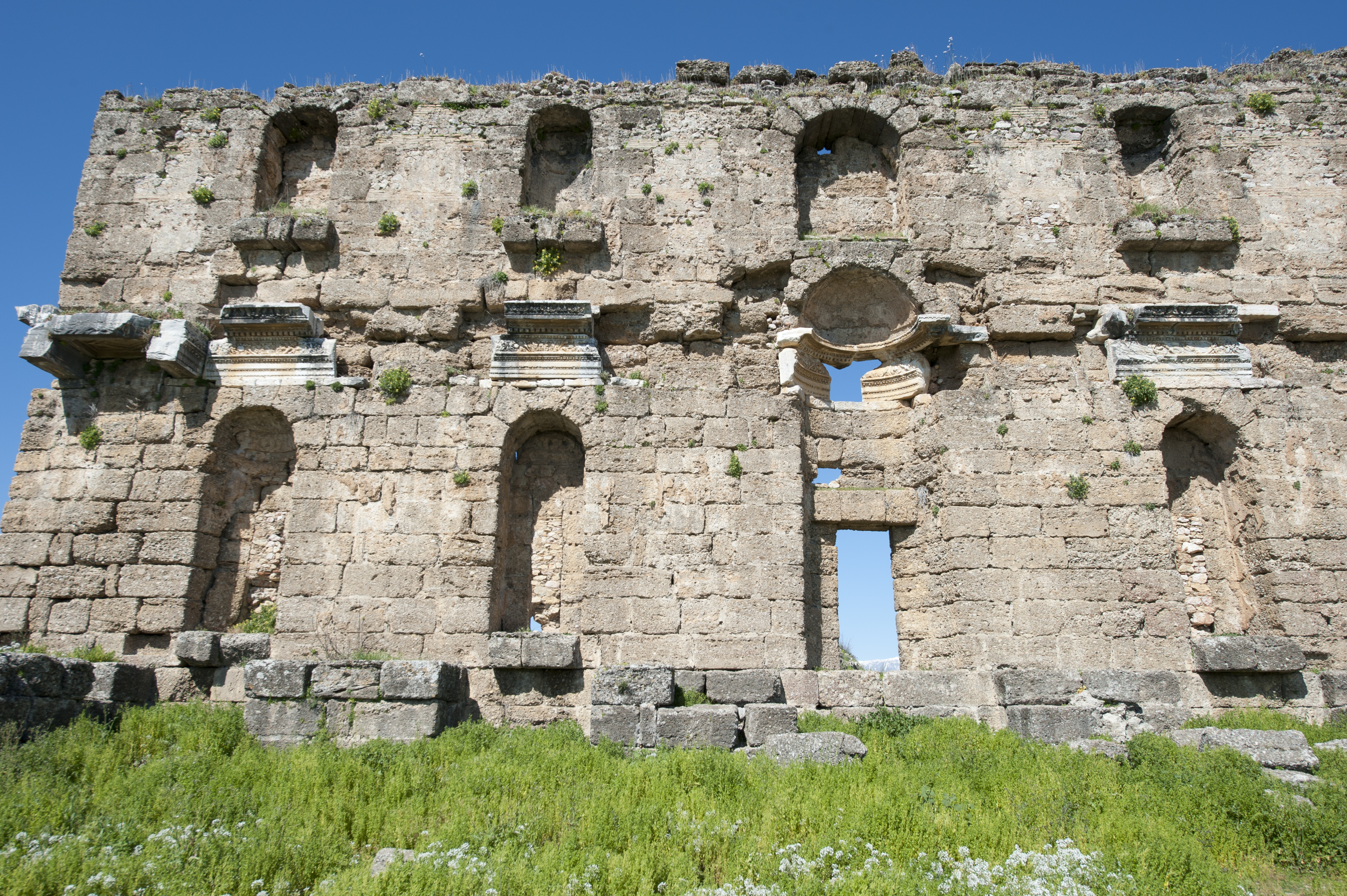
The Nymphaeum

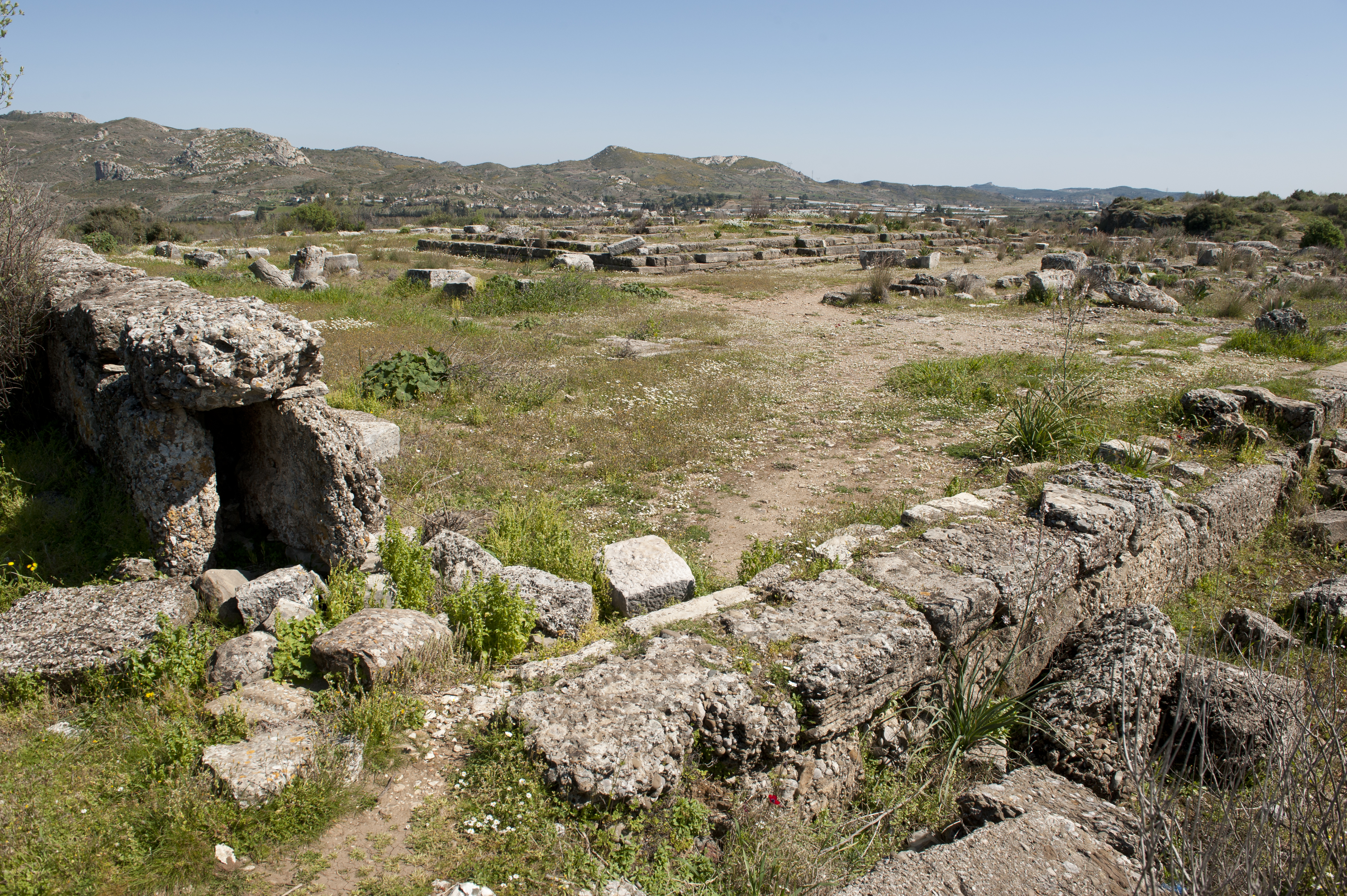
Aspendos Temple

== Bibliography ==
- Kessener, Paul (2011). "The Triple Siphon at Aspendos and its Bridges". In: Bayerische Gesellschaft für Unterwasserarchäologie (ed.). Archäologie der Brücken. Vorgeschichte, Antike, Mittelalter, Neuzeit. Archaeology of Bridges. Prehistory, Antiquity, Middle Ages, Modern Era. Regensburg: Pustet, ISBN 978-3-7917-2331-0, pp. 77–83.
- Lauter, Hans (1970). "Die hellenistische Agora von Aspendos" [The Hellenistic agora of Aspendos]. In: Bonner Jahrbücher 170, pp. 77–101.
