= Jacques Bunimowitsch =

Lithuanian-German Jewish artist

Jacques Bunimowitsch (1859-ca. 1915?; Yiddish: יעקב בונעמאוויטש; romanized: Yakov Bunimovitsh; Lithuanian: Jokūbas Bunimovičius) was a Lithuanian Jewish portrait artist who flourished in Frankfurt during the final two decades of the 19th century.

== Early life ==
Bunimowitsch's surname was Bunimovitz, which was the Yiddish pronunciation of the name; his name was later Germanized to Bunimowitsch. He was likely the younger brother of the industrialist and financeer Israel Bunimovitz (b. 1848; otherwise, a cousin); the Bunimovitz family descended from a lineage in Valozhyn (an ancestor, Aharon Bunimovitz, was the Rosh ha-kahal of Valozhyn (Volozhin) and sofer to Rabbi Chaim Volozhiner, and Jacques was a member of the Vilnius branch of that family, which arrived with Binyamin Bunimovitz of Valozhyn before 1848. Other members of this family include Irving Bunim.

== Artistic education ==
Bunimowitsch began his schooling at the Vilnius Academy of Arts during the period of 1873–74; two paintings completed during this time, Arkliai Arime and Kaimelio Gatve are examples of the Eastern European dynamic landscapes which were popular at the school at this time. His style of austere aristocratic portraiture was to come after, influenced by his subsequent teachers.

He then moved to Berlin to study under Anton von Werner at the Prussian Academy of Arts (he studied there from 1876 to 1879); Bunimowitsch apparently absorbed the genre of historical painting from von Werner, as well as the German historical painting that Von Werner practised; Bunimowitsch's portrait style can be seen as similar to von Werner's Portrait of the poet Joseph Victor von Scheffel (placement of the portrait, lighting, dressing in dark, facial staging, and so on). Likely, it was at this time when he painted a portrait of Frederick II, Grand Duke of Baden as a young teenager.

Following this, he moved to Vienna and studied at the Academy of Fine Arts Vienna under Christian Griepenkerl from 1880 until 1882. Following this, he was in Paris at the École des Beaux-Arts.

== Portrait style ==
Bunimowitsch flourished in Frankfurt as a portrait artist, likely due to his brother moving there for work as a professional scribe; otherwise, perhaps Jacques got there first, and sent for his brother to relocate to Frankfurt.

Bunimowitsch painted fine portraits of prominent Jews and royalty, two of which are housed in The Leo Baeck Institute; these are a set of two portraits of Jakob and Henriette Goldschmidt; he painted portraits of at least two of the daughters of Wilhelm Carl von Rothschild in Frankfurt, Minna Karoline Freiin von Rothschild (later von Goldschmidt; see Maximilian von Goldschmidt-Rothschild) and a posthumous portrait of her older sister, Georgine Sara von Rothschild, who had died in 1869 (her portrait looks away from the viewer, a technique known with posthumous portraiture). He may have painted a portrait of Nathan Rothschild, 1st Baron Rothschild about this time during a visit in his style of austere portraiture.

Bunimowitsch was awarded three Patents on appliances he invented.

== Gallery ==
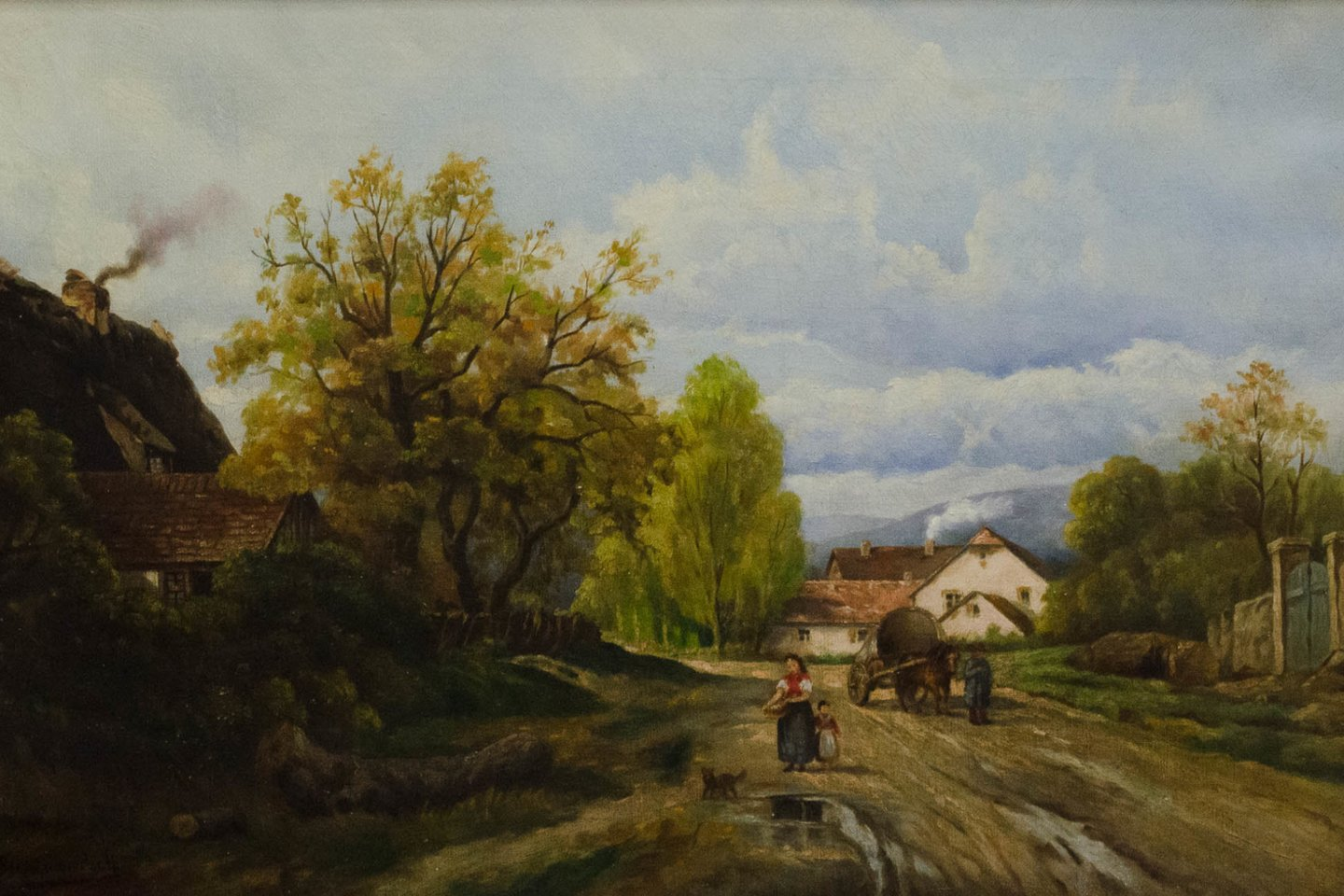
Kaimelio Gatve (Kaimelio Street, possibly Vilnius). circa 1873

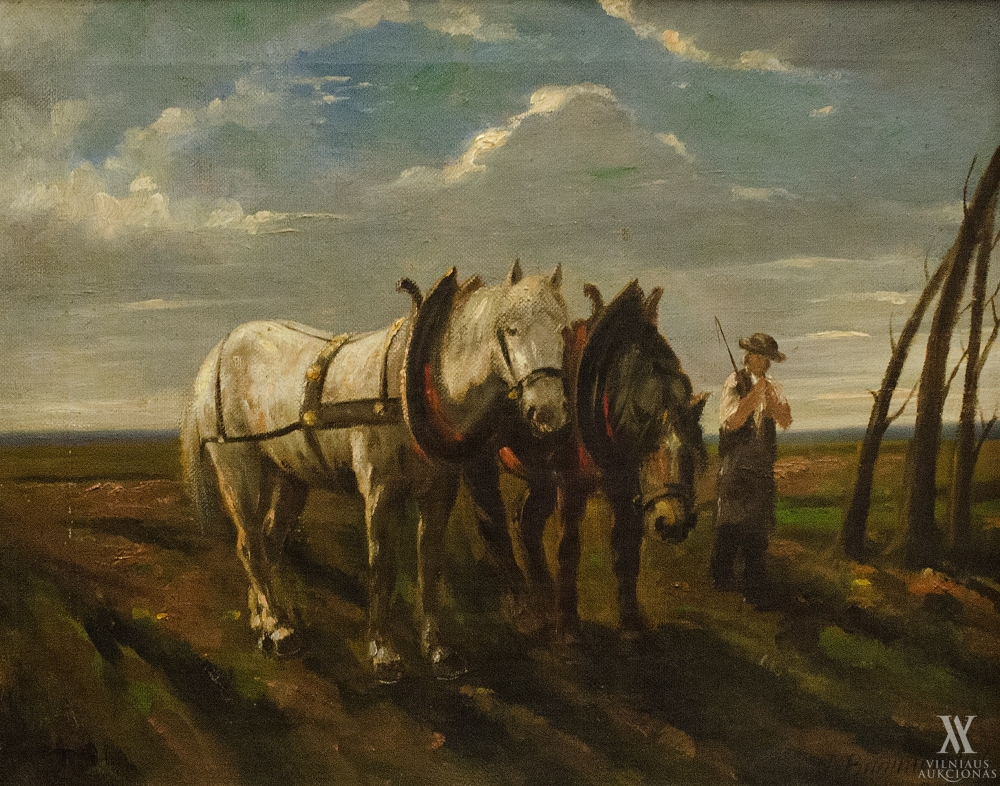
Arkliai Arime (Horses in plow), circa 1874

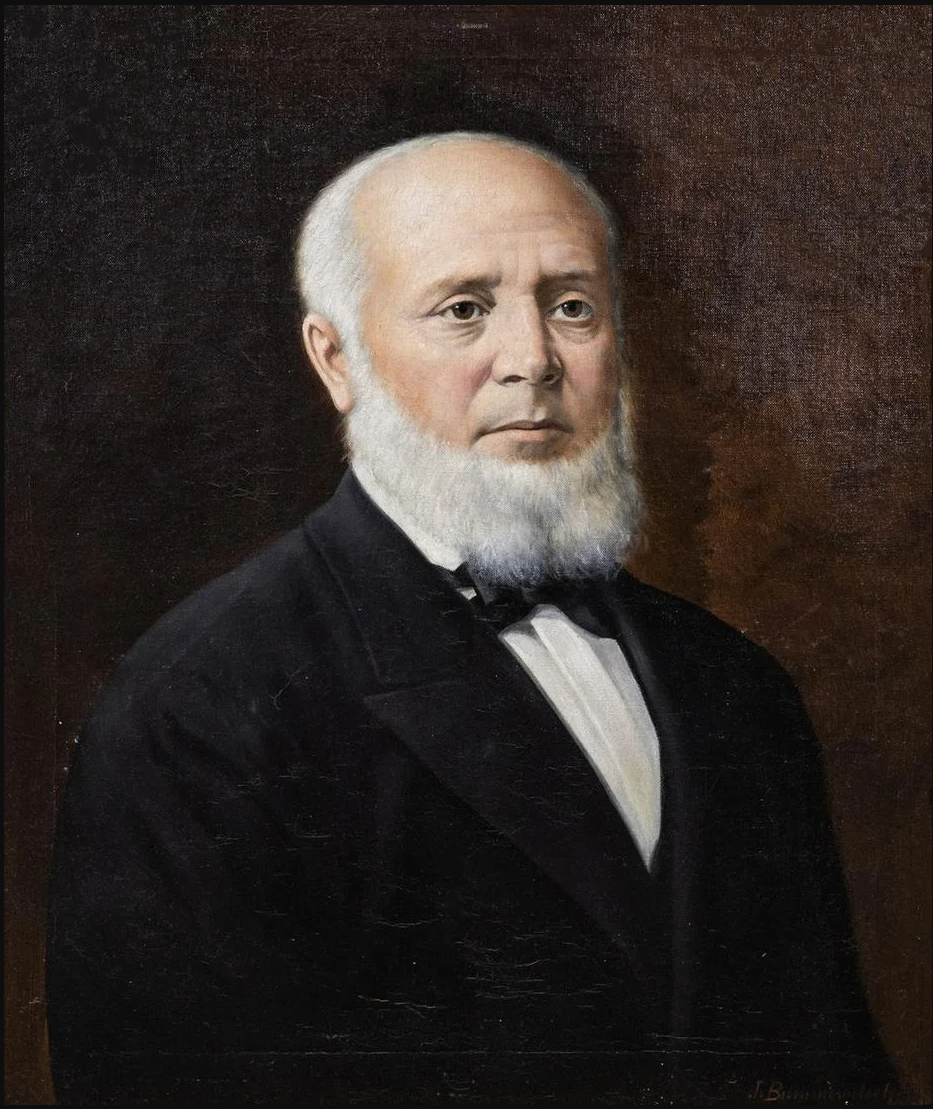
Self portrait? After 1885

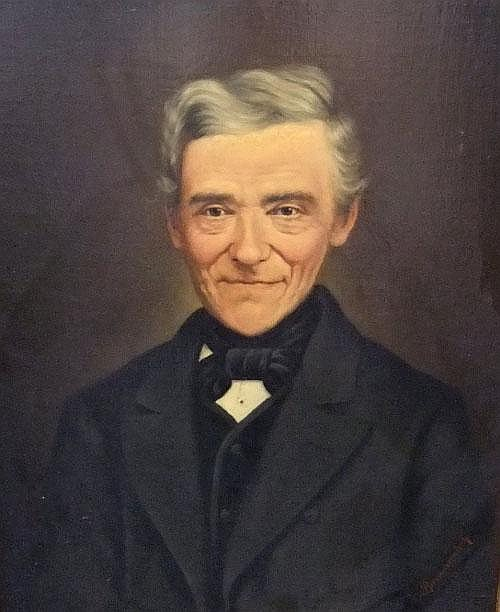
Nathan de Rothschild? 1888?-1895?

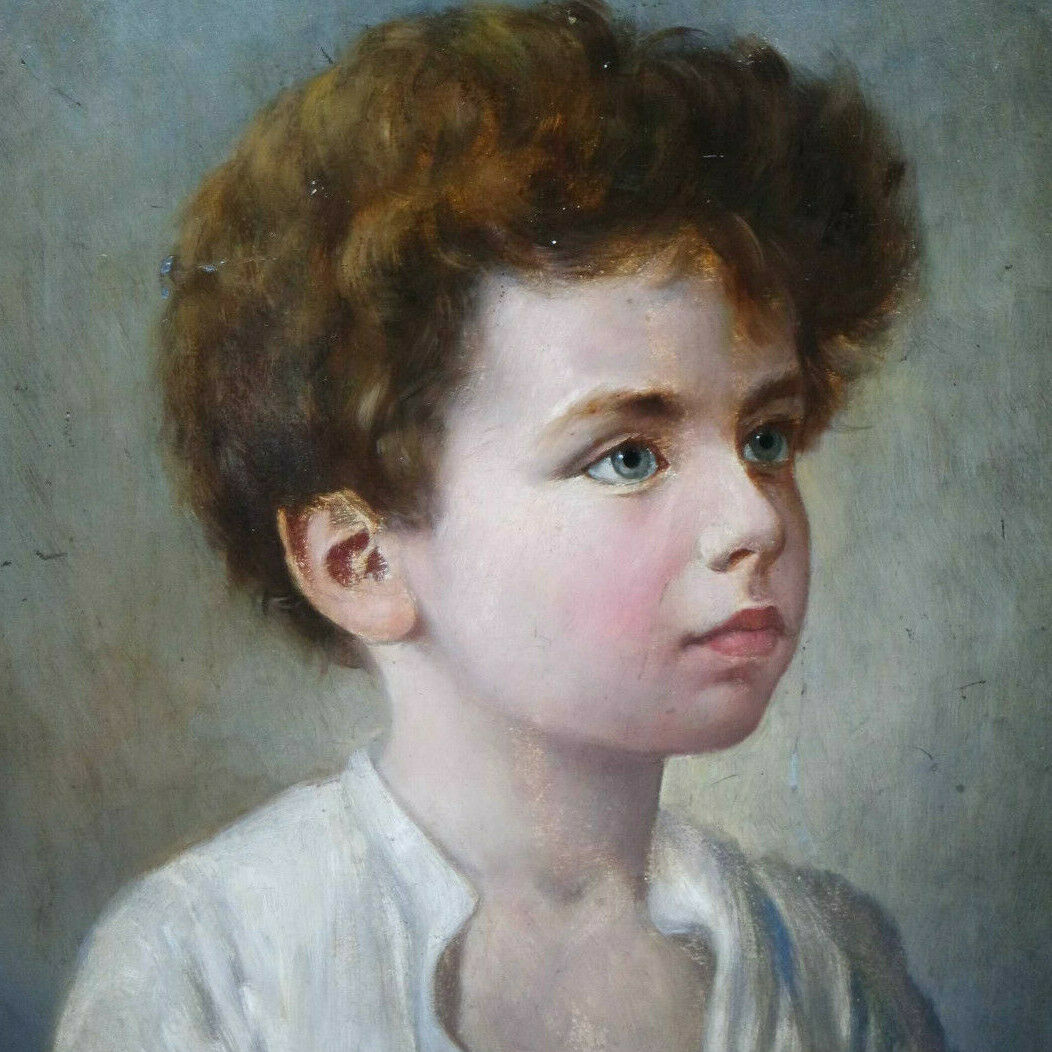
Friedrich II, Grand Duke of Baden as a child, circa 1876?

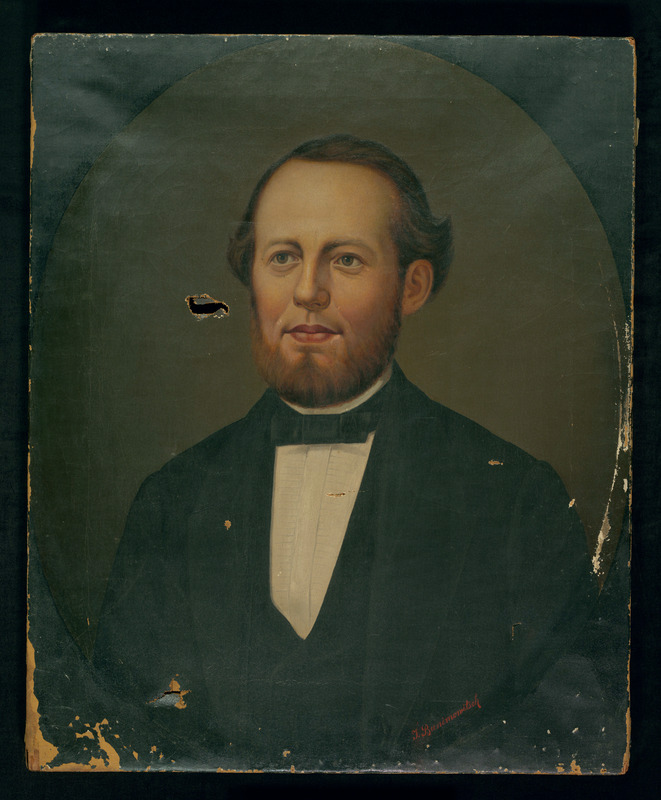
Jakob Goldschmidt (Leo Baeck Institute)

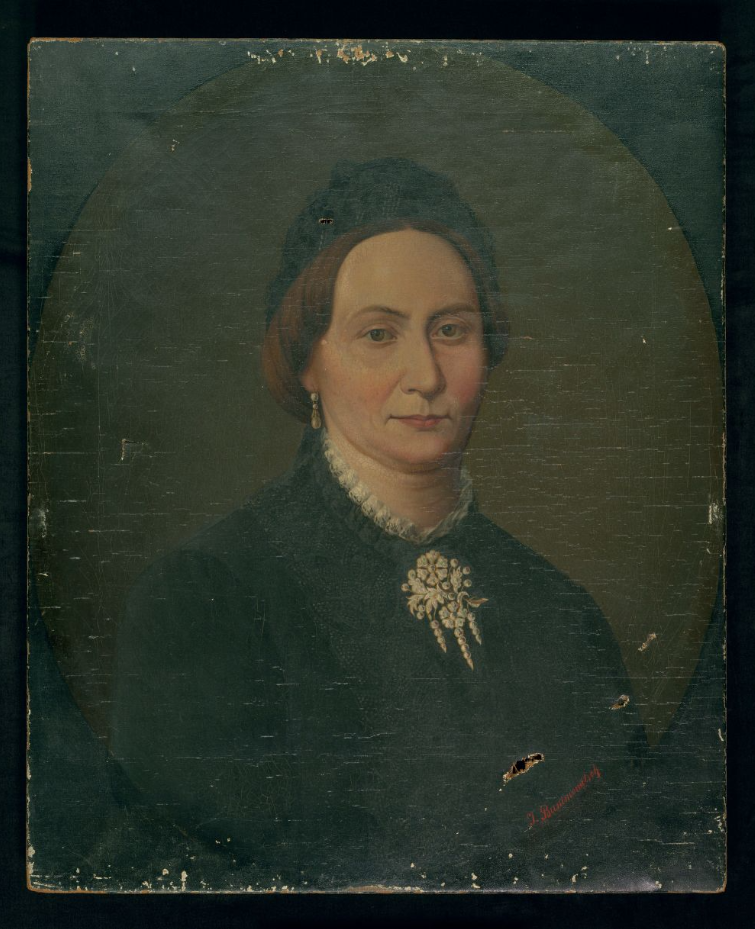
Henrietta Goldschmidt (Leo Baeck Institute)

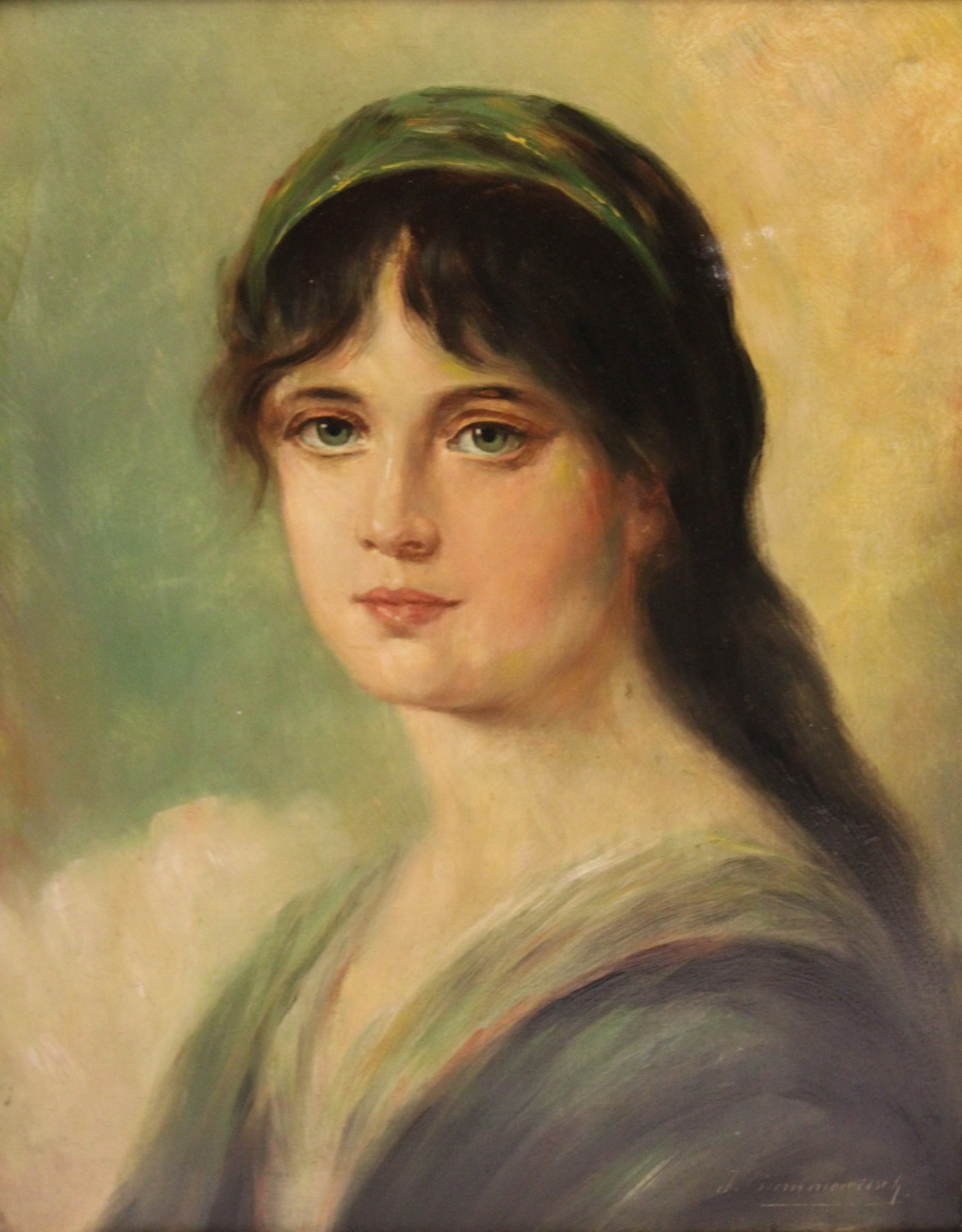
Minna Karoline Freiin von Rothschild, circa 1888

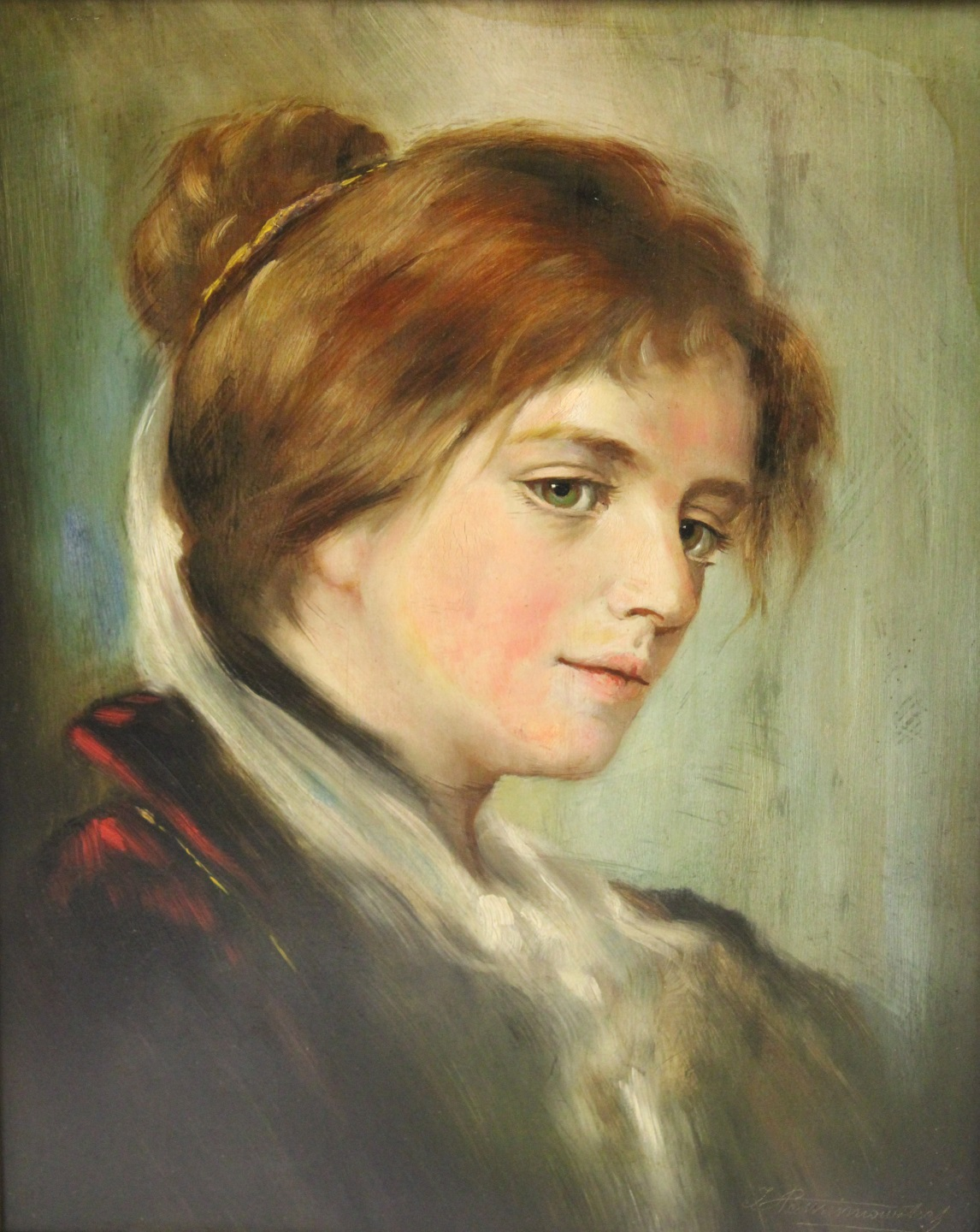
Georgina-Sara von Rothschild (posthumous), circa 1888
