= Velarium =

Suspended roof or shade awning of ancient Rome

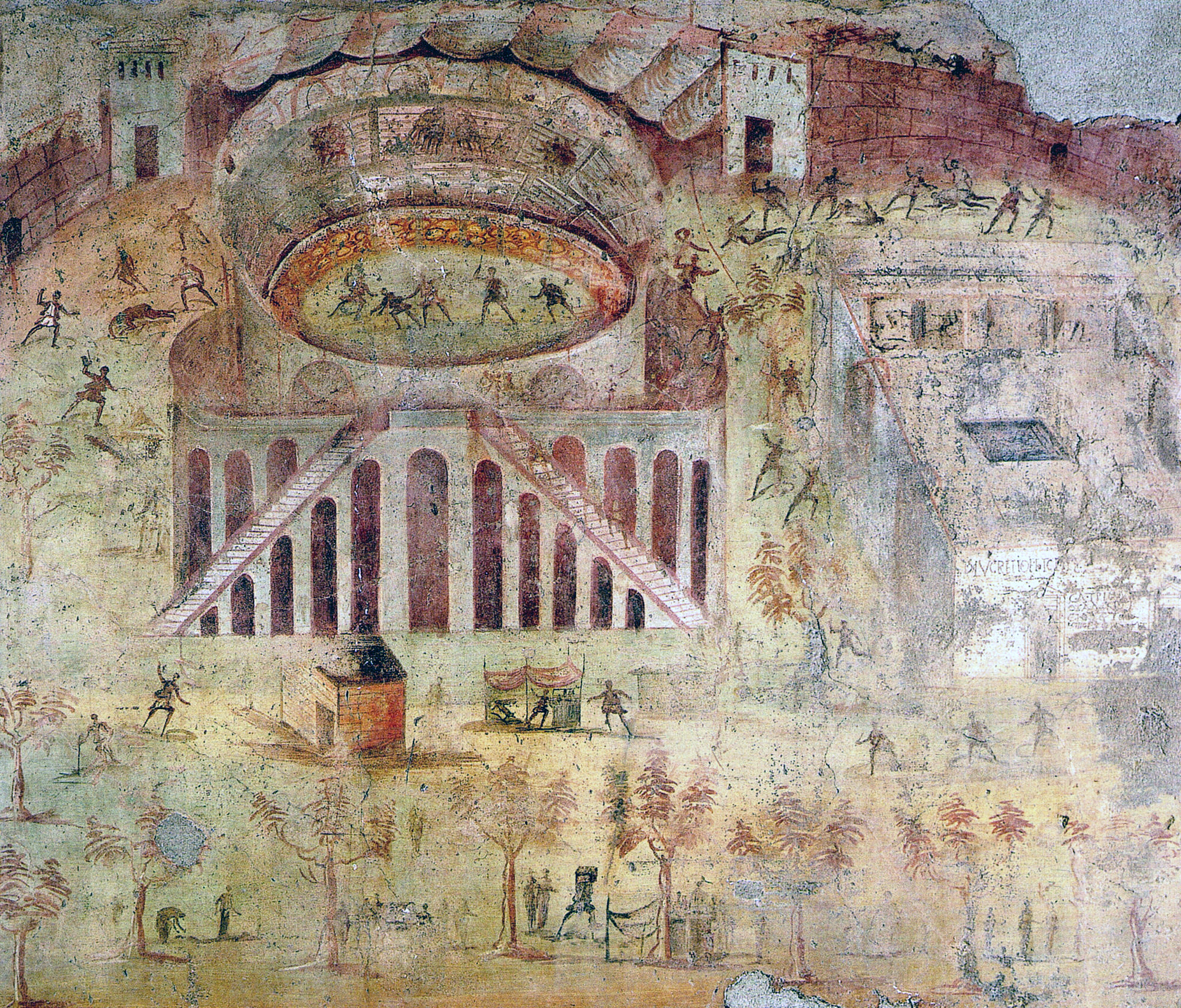
An awning is visible at the top of this contemporary fresco of a riot on and around the Pompeii Amphitheater. Surviving graffiti in Pompeii advertise that next games will have awnings (Vela erunt).

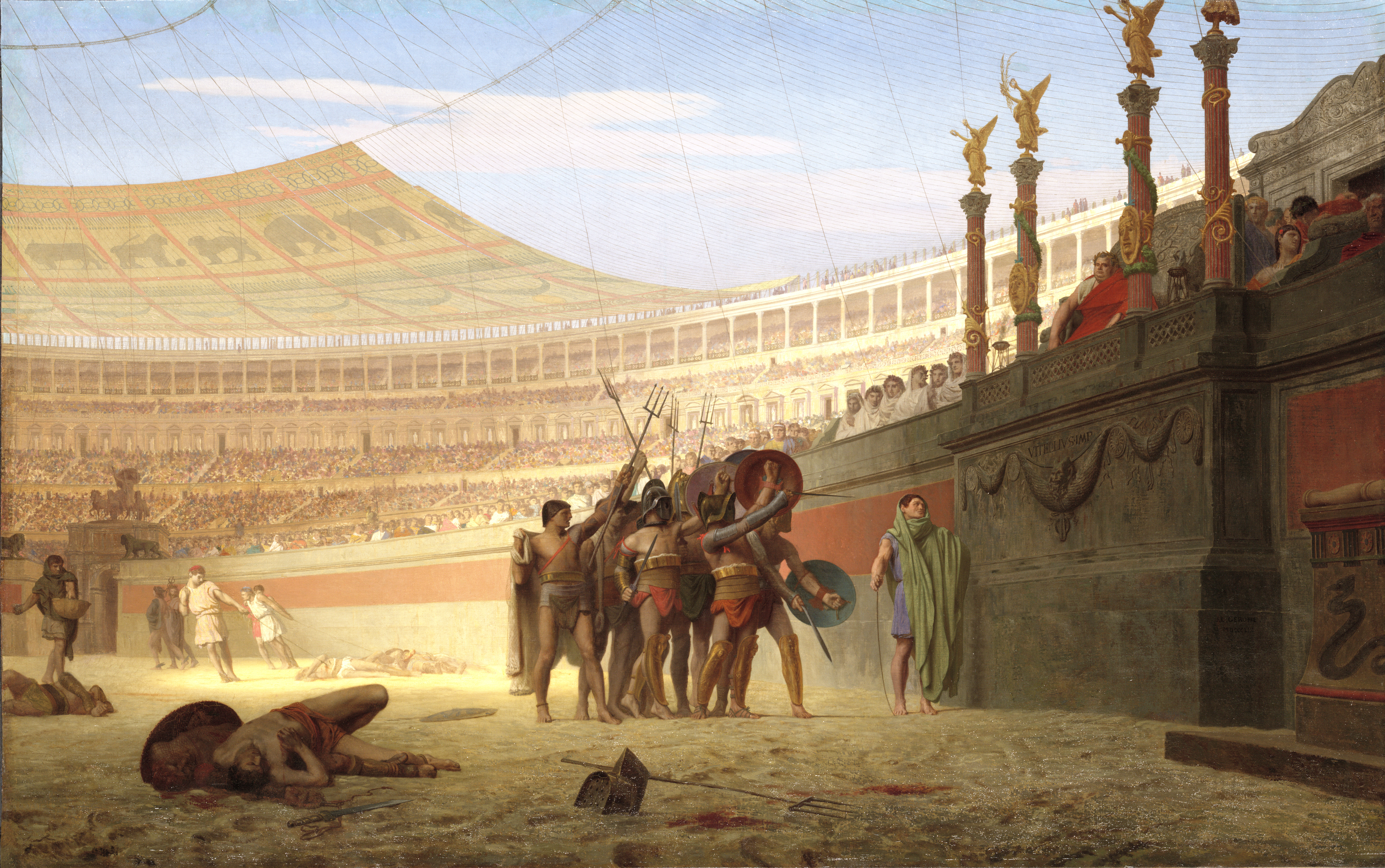
Velarium is visible in the background in Jean-Léon Gérôme's painting Ave Caesar! Morituri te salutant

Model of the Colosseum with its velarium in the Museum of Roman Civilization

A velarium ("curtain") was a type of awning used in Roman times. It stretched over the whole of the cavea, the seating area in amphitheaters, to protect spectators from the sun. Retractable awnings were relatively common throughout the Roman Empire. Though the precise details are unclear, the awning was evidently usually supported by wooden masts, the sockets and brackets for which remain on the Colosseum and Arena of Nîmes, for example.

== The Colosseum ==
The Colosseum being the biggest amphitheater of Roman times, the velarium that covered it was the biggest that ever was as well. It provided shade from the sun for up to one third of the arena. The velarium also created a ventilation updraft, creating circulation and a cool breeze.

It is believed that sailors from the Misenum fleet, with their background in sailmaking and rigging were employed to build, maintain and operate the velarium.

== In modern times ==
The Puy du Fou theme park, in France, has a Roman-style amphitheatre built for some of its shows, complete with an antique-style velarium.

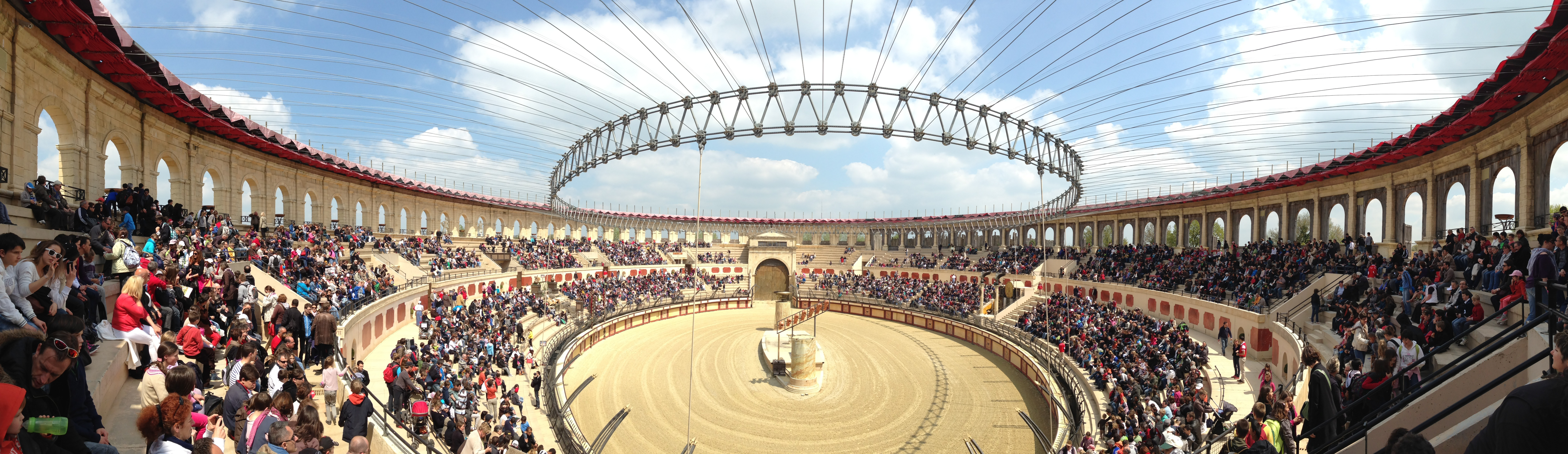
Puy du fou theme park – the arenes with the velarium closed

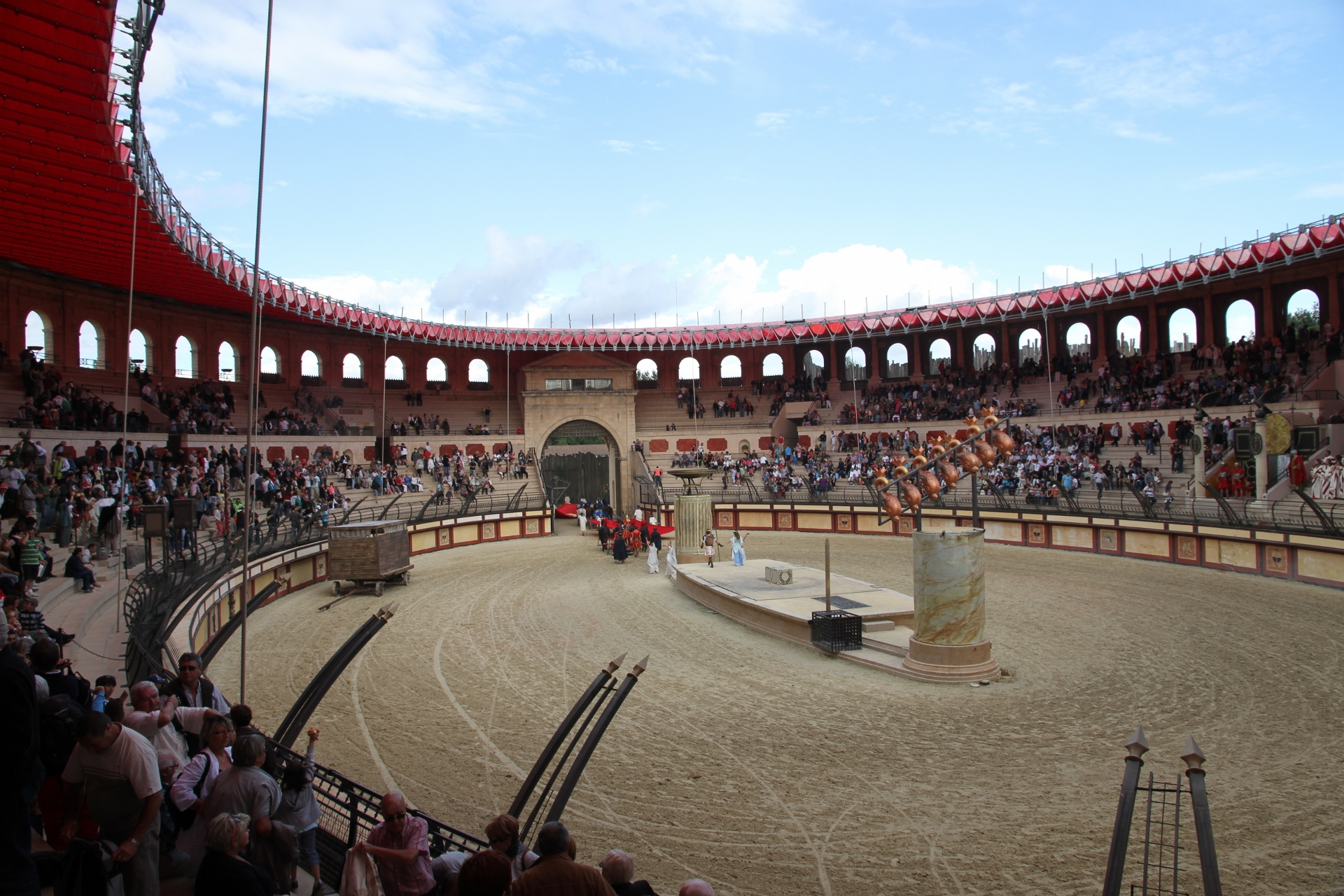
Puy du fou theme park – the arenes with the velarium deployed
