= Alazia =

Ancient City

Alazia (Ancient Greek: Ἀλαζία) was a city of ancient Mysia near the River Odrysses, which flows out of Lake Dascylitis from the west through the plain of Mygdonia and empties into the Rhyndacus. Demetrius of Scepsis calls the town Alazonia (Ἀλαζονία) and places it along with Argyria on the right bank of the Aesepus River near Scepsis. The tribe associated with the town was called Alazones based on the writings of Hekataios, Menekrates, and Palaiphatos. This tribe, which was also mentioned by Homer in the Iliad, persisted after the city of Alazia was abandoned, living in villages along the Odrysses. Strabo further clarifies its location as at the foot of Mount Ida near the source of the Aesepus.

Its site is unlocated.
