= Miletopolis =

Town in the north of ancient Mysia

Coordinates: 40°12′35″N 28°21′39″E

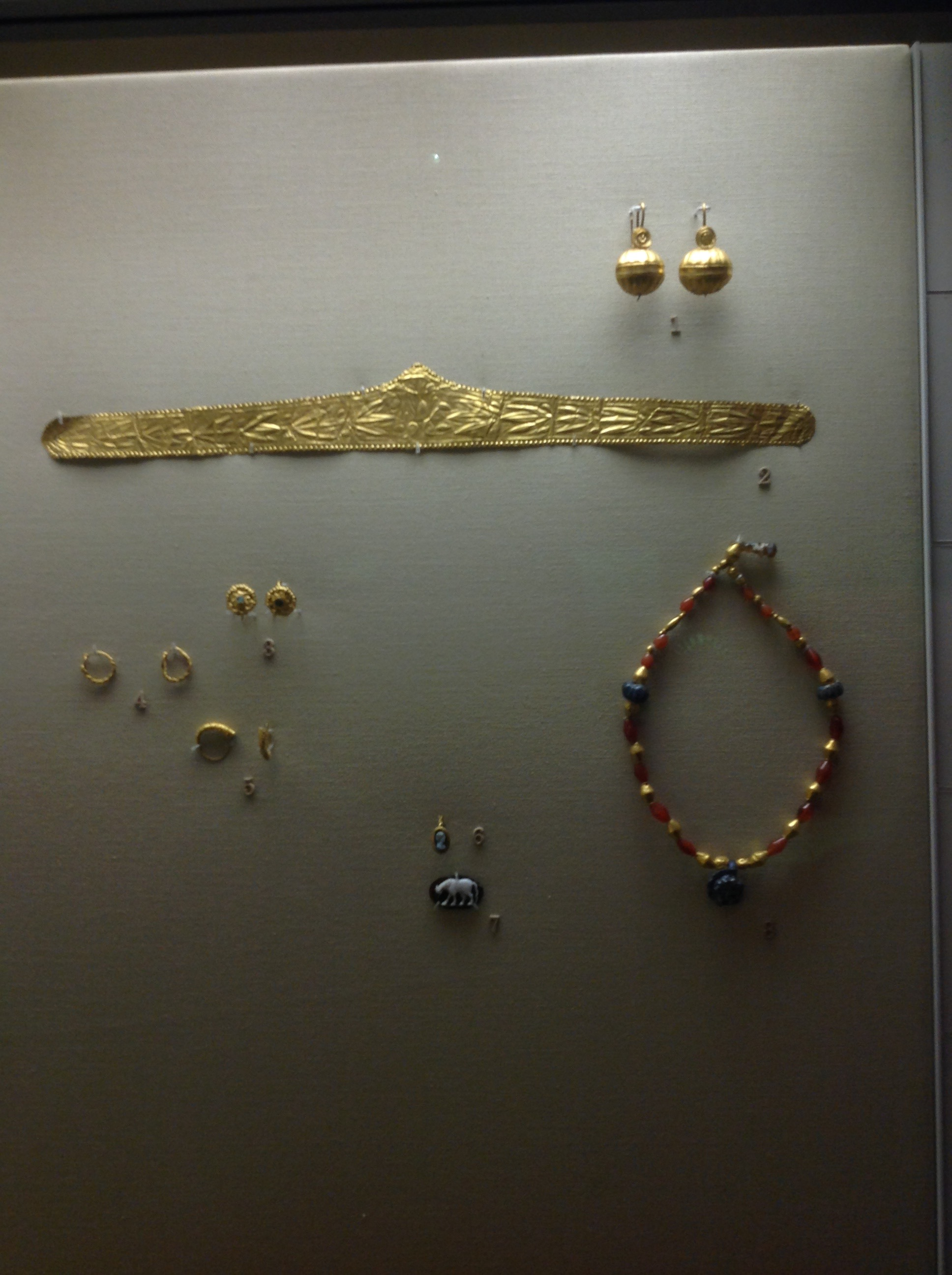
Hoard of delivery from a tomb in the vicinity of Miletopolis dating to 175-180 AD, British Museum

Miletopolis (Ancient Greek: Μιλητόπολις) or Miletoupolis (Μιλητούπολις) was a town in the north of ancient Mysia, at the confluence of the rivers Macestus and Rhyndacus, and on the west of the lake which derives its name from the town. It was a Milesian colony. Strabo mentions that a part of the inhabitants of the town were transferred to Gargara at some indeterminant time. At least for some time, Miletopolis belonged to Cyzicus.

It was Christianised at an early date and remains a bishopric of the Greek Orthodox Church and a titular see of the Roman Catholic Church. Between 1970 and 1975, Stylianos Harkianakis, who would later become Archbishop Stylianos of Australia held the title of Greek Orthodox Bishop of Miletopolis. Since 2011, the Greek Orthodox Bishop to hold the title of Miletopolis is Bishop Iakovos of Miletopolis who serves as an assistant bishop in the Greek Orthodox Archdiocese of Australia.

The name of the ancient city was still known locally in the 16th century, as shown by the account of the traveller Petrus Gyllius. The site is located near Karacabey, Bursa Province, Turkey.

== Bibliography ==
- Schwertheim, Elmar (1983). Die Inschriften von Kyzikos und Umgebung. Teil II: Miletupolis. Inschriften und Denkmäler [The Inscriptions of Cyzicus and the Surrounding Area. Part II: Miletupolis. Inscriptions and Monuments]. Inschriften griechischer Städte aus Kleinasien, vol. 26. Bonn: Habelt, ISBN 3-7749-2034-6.
