= Constantine's Bridge (Mysia) =

- Coordinates: 40°12′15″N 28°26′29″E
- Crosses: Rhyndacus (Adırnas Çayı)
- Locale: Mysia, Turkey

Characteristics
- Design: Arch bridge

History
- Construction end: After 258 AD

Location
- Interactive map of Constantine's Bridge

Constantine's Bridge was a late antique bridge in Mysia, modern-day Turkey.

The structure, built some time after 258 AD, crossed the river Rhyndacus (modern Adırnas Çayı) at Lopadium (modern Uluabat). It was crowned in Byzantine times by a chapel dedicated by Saint Helena to emperor Constantine I (r. 324–337 AD). Only few remains have survived: at the beginning of the 20th century, the English archaeologist Frederick William Hasluck reported no arch as complete, and only a few ruined piers on the north bank. The masonry consisted of ashlar-faced rubble.

Apart from Constantine's Bridge, other remarkably well preserved Roman bridges have survived in Mysia, known by the rivers they cross as the Makestos Bridge, the Aesepus Bridge and the White Bridge over the Granicus.

== See also ==
- List of Roman bridges
- Roman architecture
- Roman engineering

== Sources ==
- Hasluck, Frederick William (1905–1906), "A Roman Bridge on the Aesepus", The Annual of the British School at Athens, vol. 12, pp. 184–189
