= Argyria (disambiguation) =

Argyria is a skin condition due to exposure to silver.

Argyria may also refer to:

- Argyria (moth), a genus of moth
- Argyria (Pontus), a town of ancient Pontus, now in Turkey
- Argyria (Troad), a town of the ancient Troad, now in Turkey
