= Frederick William Hasluck =

English archaeologist (1878–1920)

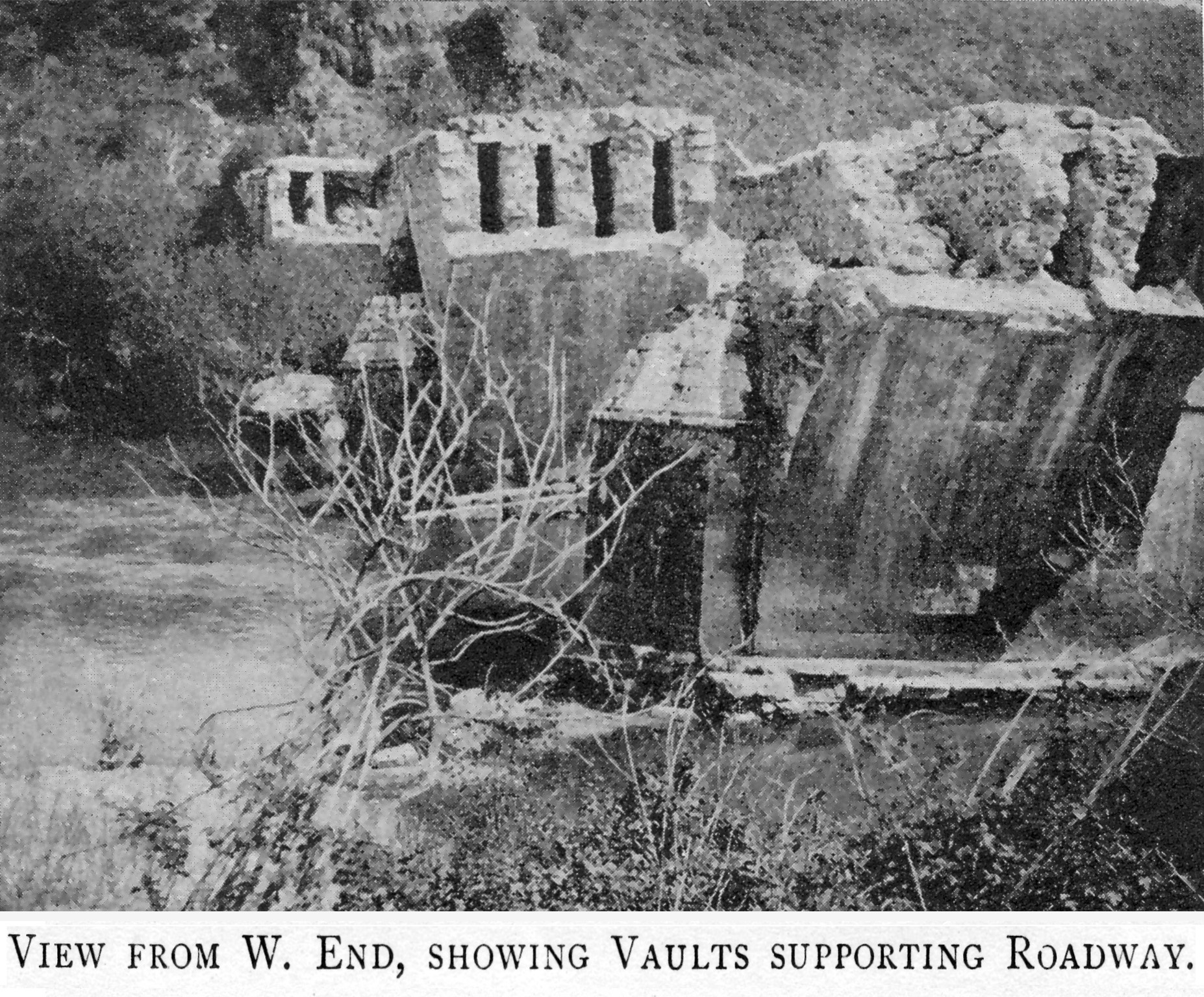
The Aesepus Bridge in Mysia, discovered and described by Hasluck

Frederick William Hasluck (16 February 1878 – 22 February 1920) was an English antiquarian, historian, and archaeologist.

Hasluck was educated at The Leys School and King's College, Cambridge, graduating with a first class degree in classics in 1904 and winning a Browne medal. He then went to the British School at Athens and helped on excavations in Laconia, Greece namely in Geraki and Angelona, Cyzicus and Bithynia, finding much new material, including an inscription of Cn. Pompeius Magnus and unpublished local coins. His most notable find was a large Roman bridge in Mysia, hitherto unrecorded, the Aesepus Bridge. There he also investigated the sites of the Makestos Bridge, White Bridge and Constantine's Bridge. In 1906 he toured Asia Minor with Richard M. Dawkins.

In 1913, being Assistant Director (1911–15) and Librarian (1906–15) of the British School in Athens, Hasluck married Margaret Hardie. As a wedding present, Hardie chose a visit to Konya (ancient Iconium) from the options offered her by her husband, and the couple spent the spring of 1913 there together. Frederick had long been interested in the interplay of Christianity and Islam within the Turkish Empire, and he was gradually to make this a central part of his work. The Haslucks were based in Athens and, over the next four years, had the opportunity to travel widely together in the southwest Balkans.

Hasluck's work was cut short by a combination of factors, one of which was his becoming the target of Alan John Bayard Wace, an erstwhile colleague in Athens, who appears to have regarded Hasluck a potential rival. Returning to London, having prepared the ground by becoming part of the managing committee, Wace gained the post of Director of the School and, possibly motivated also by an animosity toward Mrs. Hasluck, asked London to sack Hasluck. This they did. The Haslucks stayed in Athens working at the British Legation and assisted British wartime intelligence operations. In 1916 Margaret accompanied her husband to Switzerland, where he entered a tuberculosis sanatorium. He died four years later on 22 February 1920.

== See also ==
- Saint Amphilochius (Konya)

== Bibliography ==
- Cyzicus, 1910.
- Constantinata, 1913.
- Mount Athos and the Monasteries, 1924.
- Letters on Religion and Folklore, 1926.
- Christianity and Islam under the Sultans, edited by Margaret Hasluck, Vols. I and II, (Oxford: Oxford University Press, 1929), reprinted (Istanbul: Isis Press, 2000), with different pagination.
- Hasluck, Frederick William (1905–1906), "A Roman Bridge on the Aesepus", The Annual of the British School at Athens, 12: 184–189, doi:10.1017/s0068245400008066
- Hasluck, Frederick William; Wace, Alan John Bayard (1904–1905), "Laconia" (PDF), The Annual of the British School at Athens, 11: 81–99, doi:10.1017/s0068245400002446
  - Part I: Excavations near Angelona, pp. 81–90
  - Part II: Geraki, Chapter 1: Excavations, pp. 91–99

== Works about F. W. Hasluck ==
- Shankland, David (2004), Archaeology, Anthropology and Heritage in the Balkans and Anatolia: The Life and Times of F. W. Hasluck 1878-1920, Istanbul, Isis Press.
- Halliday, William Reginald (December 1920) "Obituary of F. W. Hasluck", Folk-Lore, volume 31 pp. 336–338.
