= Hellespontus =

Hellespontus is a Latin geographical name, which may refer to:

- the Hellespont, Ancient name for the Dardanalles strait, connecting the Sea of Marmara with the Aegean and Mediterranean Seas, while allowing passage to the Black Sea by extension via the Bosphorus
- Hellespontus (province), a Late Roman province in the historic region of Mysia
