= Egemen HES =

- Location within Turkey
- Country: Turkey
- Location: Keles, Bursa Province
- Coordinates: 40°02′N 29°06′E

Dam and spillways
- Impounds: Nilüfer River

Power Station
- Installed capacity: 19.2 MWe
- Annual generation: 95 GWh

Egemen HES is hydro electric power station in Turkey. It is on Nilüfer River in Keles ilçe (district) of Bursa Province. The nominal power of the system is 19.92 MWe. In 2015 it produced 95 GW-hr energy. It is operated by the private Zaf Group. The net hydraulic head is 159 metres (522 ft).
