= Parthenium (Mysia) =

Town of ancient Mysia

Coordinates: 39°13′05″N 27°20′06″E

Parthenium or Parthenion (Ancient Greek: Παρθένιον) was a town of ancient Mysia near ancient Pergamum.

Its site is tentatively located near Eski Bergama, Asiatic Turkey.
