= Bathys Limen =

Location in ancient Mysia

Coordinates: 40°30′20″N 27°46′43″E

Bathys Limen (Ancient Greek: Βαθύς λιμήν), meaning deep harbor, was a town located on the coast of the Propontis on the promontory of Cyzicus, in ancient Mysia.

Its site is located near Vathy, Asiatic Turkey.
