= Caresene =

Caresene or Karesene (Ancient Greek: Καρησήνη) was a mountainous tract in the ancient Troad, which contained many villages, and was well cultivated. It bordered on the Dardanice as far as the parts about Zeleia and Pityeia. It was named from the Caresus River, mentioned by Homer in the Iliad, which flows into the Aesepus River. The Caresus has a considerable valley (αὐλῶν), but less than that of the Aesepus. Strabo says that the Andrius or Andirus River (the modern Kursak Çay), which flows into the Scamander River, also rises in the Caresene, part of which is therefore probably a high plateau, on which the Andrius and Caresus rise. The Caresus springs between Palaescepsis and Achaeum, which is opposite to the island of Tenedos. There was a city Caresus, but it was ruined before Strabo's time.
