= Pericharaxis =

Inland town of ancient Mysia

Coordinates: 39°45′54″N 27°38′31″E

Pericharaxis (Ancient Greek: Περιχάραξις) was an inland town of ancient Mysia. Its name does not occur in ancient authors but is attested by epigraphic evidence.

Its site is located near the neibgherhood of Kadı Kale Çay in Asiatic Turkey.
