= Constantine's Bridge =

Constantine's Bridge may refer to:

- Constantine's Bridge (Danube), a Roman bridge over the Danube
- Constantine's Bridge (Mysia), a Roman bridge in Mysia, modern-day Turkey
- Constantine's Bridge (Arles) ruins of a Roman bridge in Arles, France
