= Saint Amphilochius (Konya) =

Former church in present-day Turkey

Saint Amphilochius (Turkish: Eflatun Mescidi) was a church that, until the 1920s, stood on the citadel of Konya, Turkey. The church was venerated by both Greeks and Turks, and was discussed by the scholar F.W. Hasluck.

== See also ==
- Amphilochius of Iconium
- Alâeddin Mosque (Konya, Turkey)

== Bibliography ==
- Gertrude Bell and William Ramsay, The Thousand and One Churches (Hodder and Stoughton, 1909): pp. 403–406.
- Semavi Evyice “Konya’nın Alaeddin Tepesinde Selçuklu Öncesine Ait Bir Eser: Eflâtûn Mescidisi,” Sanat Tarihi Yıllıġı 4 (1970–1).
- F.W. Hasluck, Christianity and Islam Under the Sultans, edited by Margaret M. Hasluck, reprint of 1929 (Istanbul: Isis Press, 2000): pp. 11, 66, 70, 314–19. (N.B. the pagination is different in the Isis and Oxford editions)
- Scott Redford, “The Alâeddin Mosque Reconsidered” Artibus Asiae, vol. 51, no. 1/2. (1991): p. 54.
