= Margaret Hasluck =

Margaret Hasluck

Margaret Masson Hardie Hasluck M.B.E. (1944) (18 June 1885 – 18 October 1948) was a Scottish geographer, linguist, epigrapher, archaeologist and scholar.

== Biography ==
Margaret Hasluck was born Margaret Hardie and graduated from Aberdeen University where she received Honors in Classics in 1907, and then went to Cambridge, completing her studies with honours in 1911. She was not awarded a degree because Cambridge did not award degrees to women until 1948. Hasluck then attended the British School in Athens and worked in the field at Pisidian antioch and published, "The Shrine of Men Askaenos at Pisidian Antioch" and "Dionysos at Smyrna". Marrying Frederick William Hasluck, Assistant Director of the British School in Athens, they honeymooned in Konya, and, based in Athens, the couple travelled throughout Turkey and the Balkans. In 1916 Frederick contracted tuberculosis and died four years later in Switzerland, and Hardie-Hasluck moved to England to edit her husband's books and published them under the name of Margaret Hasluck.

Hasluck then travelled to Albania where she undertook anthropological research in Macedonia and made her home in Elbasan for 13 years, becoming a legend among the Albanians and publishing numerous articles, including the first English-Albanian grammar and reader. Due to her intelligence work in World War I, she was forced to leave Albania for Athens when the Italians annexed the country in 1939. While in Albania, Hasluck is said to have been romantically involved with Albanian scholar and politician Lef Nosi, to whom she left her rich personal library.

When Athens became unsafe, she moved to Istanbul as an observer and advised the British Government intelligence about the Albanian situation. Later she went to Cairo, always carrying the Albanian cause with her. In 1945 she was diagnosed as having leukaemia and moved to Cyprus and then to Dublin where she died on 18 October 1948.

On Friday 18 June 2010, the 125th anniversary of her birth, a ceremony took place on her property in Elbasan, Albania. Attended by the prefect of the Elbasan District, Shefqet Deliallisi, the Mayor of Elbasan Qazim Sejdini and Her Excellency Fiona McIlwham, British Ambassador to Albania among many guests, the ceremony was also attended by several members of Margaret's Hardie Family. A plaque was jointly unveiled on her property by her nephew John Donald Morrison Hardie OBE and Qazim Sejdini, Mayor of Elbasan. After a presentation on the life of Margaret Hasluck, held at the 'Home of Hope / Shtëpia e Shpresës' Orphanage which occupies a building on her property, the children of the orphanage gave a presentation of costumes and music, which was followed by a reception at the Home of Hope. Margaret Hasluck's family members were presented with a certificate awarding Margaret Hasluck the status 'Citizen of Honour', on the grounds of 'her outstanding contribution to the public sphere of the city of Elbasan'.[source: Gazeta Shqiptare & Shqip 19 Qershor/June 2010]

Hasluck is one of the principal subjects of the essay collection No Man's Lands: eight extraordinary women in Balkan history, by the British-Kosovan writers Elizabeth Gowing and Robert Wilton.

== Bibliography ==
- The Shrine of Men Askaenos at Pisidian Antioch, 1912
- Dionysos at Smyrna, 1912–1913
- The Significance of Greek Personal Names, 1923
- Christian Survivals among Certain Moslem Subjects of Greece, 1924
- The Nonconformist Moslems of Albania, 1925
- A Lucky Spell from a Greek Island, 1926
- The Basil-Cake of the Greek New Year, 1927
- An Unknown Turkish Shrine in Western Macedonia, 1929
- Measurements of Macedonian Men, 1929
- Traditional Games of the Turks, 1930
- Këndime Englisht-Shqip or Albanian-English Reader: Sixteen Albanian Folk-Stories Collected and Translated, with Two Grammars and Vocabularies, Cambridge, 1932
- Physiological Paternity and Belated Birth in Albania, 1932
- Bride-Price in Albania: A Homeric Parallel, 1933
- A Historical Sketch of the Fluctuations of Lake Ostrovo in West Macedonia, 1936
- The Archaeological History of Lake Ostrovo in West Macedonia, 1936
- Causes of the Fluctuations in the Level of Lake Ostrovo, West Macedonia, 1937
- The Gypsies of Albania, 1938
- Couvade in Albania, 1939
- The Sedentary Gypsies of Metzoro, 1939
- Dervishes in Albania, 9 June 1939 Guardian Newspaper (Page 24)
- Baba Tomor, 13 September 1939 Guardian Newspaper (page 12)
- Firman of A. H. 1013–14 (A.D. 1604-5) Regarding Gypsies in the Western Balkans, 1948
- Oedipus Rex in Albania, 1949
- The unwritten law in Albania, publ. 1954, ISBN 0-88355-910-2

== Books edited by Margaret M. Hasluck ==
- Athos and its Monasteries, 1924
- Letters on Religion and Folklore, 1926
- F.W.Hasluck, Christianity and Islam under the Sultans, 1929
