= Caresus =

Town of the ancient Troad

Caresus or Karesos (Ancient Greek: Κάρησος) was a town of the ancient Troad, on a river of the same name, in a mountainous tract called the Caresene. It was ruined before Strabo's time.

Its site is unlocated.
