= Nilüfer River =

River in Turkey

Coordinates: 40°17′58″N 28°27′26″E

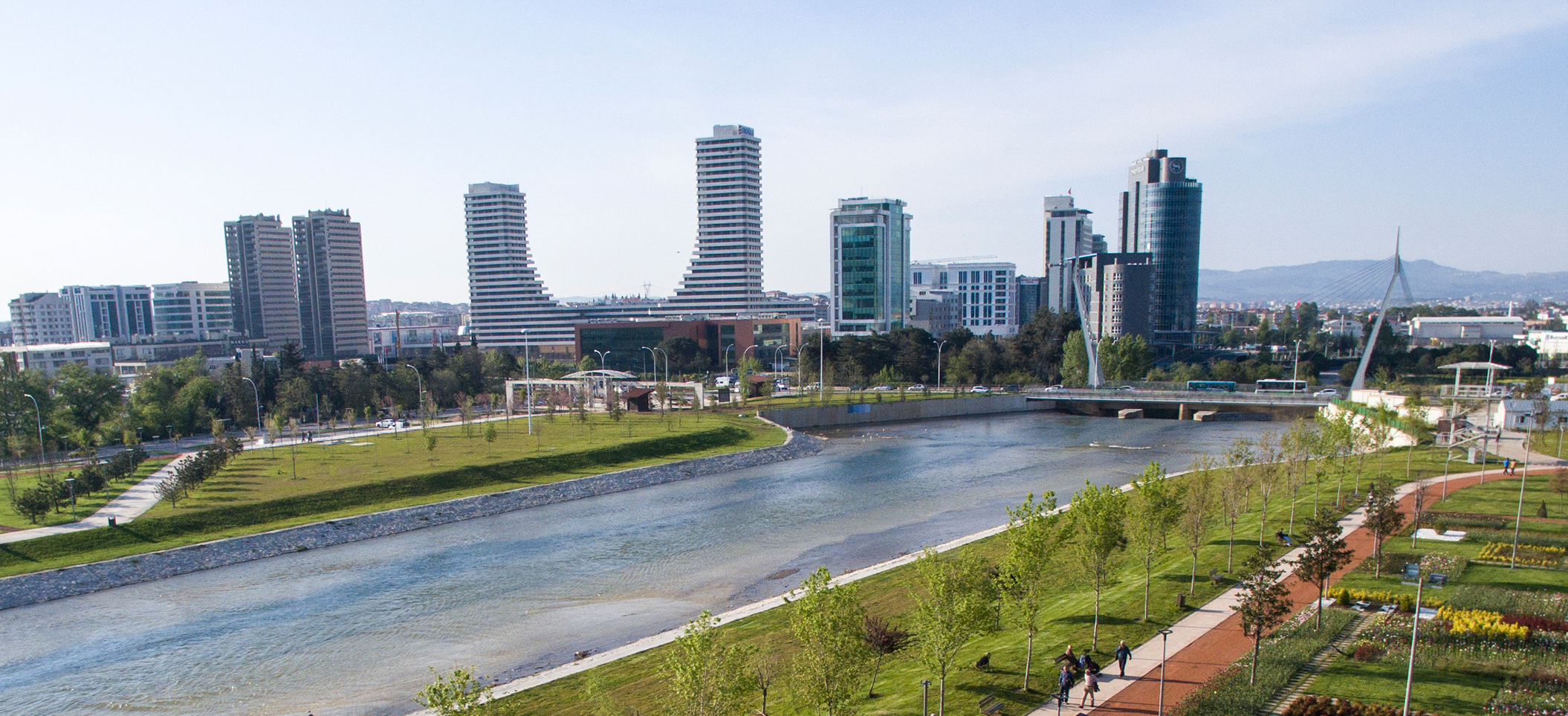
- Hüdavendigar Park, along the shores of the Nilüfer River in Bursa

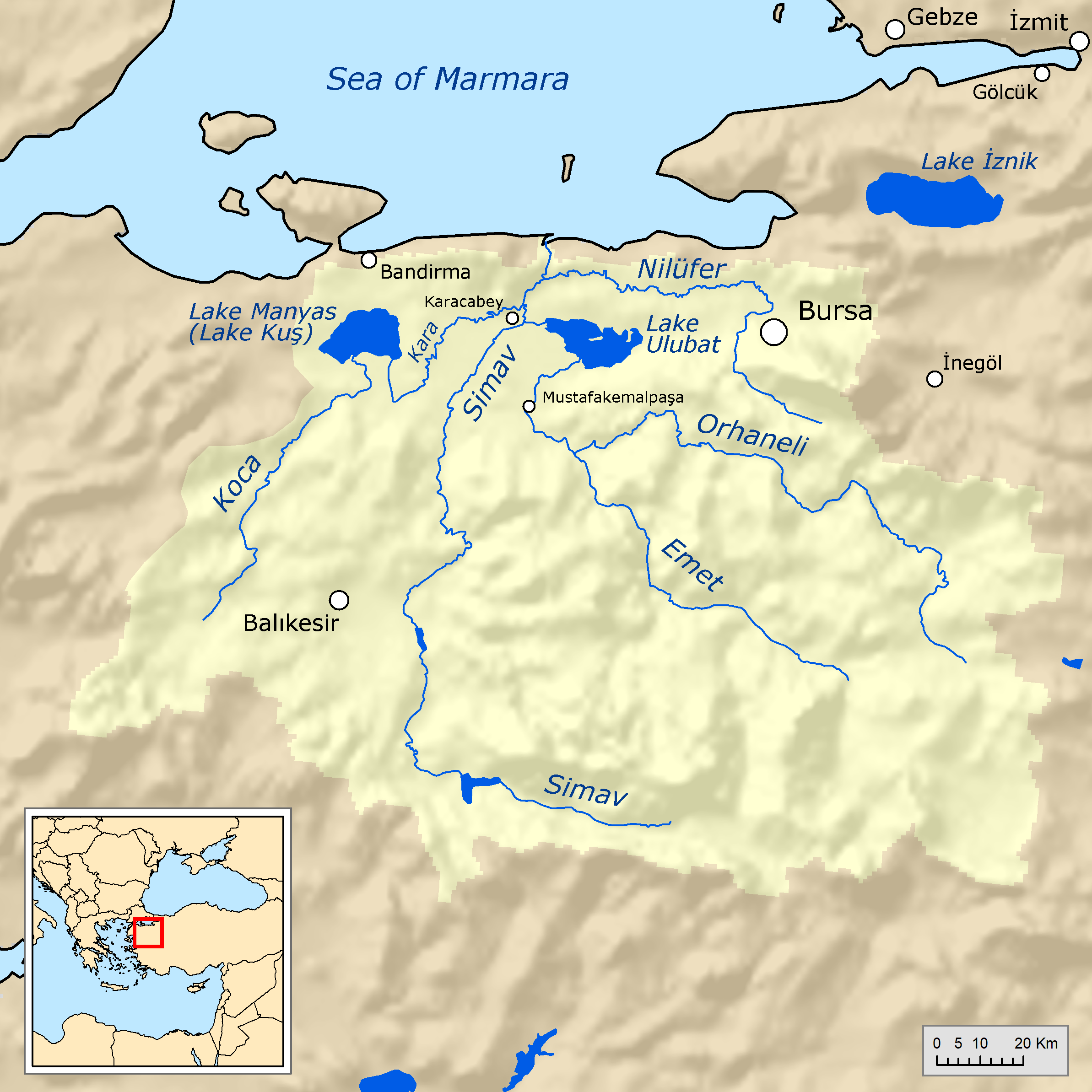
- Map of the Simav River basin of which the Nilüfer is a tributary

Physical characteristics
- Source: Uludağ
- Mouth: Simav River
- Length: 203 km (126 mi)

Basin features
- Cities: Bursa

The Nilufer or Niloufer River (Turkish: Nilüfer Çayı) is a river in Bursa Province, Turkey. From its source near Mount Uludağ (the classical Mysian Olympus) and flowing past the city of Bursa, the river tends to the northwest along its course of 203 kilometres (126 mi). The Doğancı-1 Dam crosses the river.

In Turkish, nilüfer means "water lily." The river may have been named for the flowers or for Nilüfer Hatun, a wife of the Ottoman sultan Orhan. The district of Nilüfer in Bursa Province is named after the river.

Writing in the 19th century, John Cramer considered the Nilufer to be the classical Odrysses, although he noted reasons to question this. (Latin: Horisius). The Barrington Atlas of the Greek and Roman World rejects this identification, instead identifying Odrysses with the modern Karadere, a tributary of the Simav River. According to Strabo, its plain was known as Mygdonia and formed the Persian satrapy of Dascylium. It formerly flowed into the Rhyndacus but now joins the Simav River (ancient Macestos) north of Karacabey.
