= Macestus Bridge =

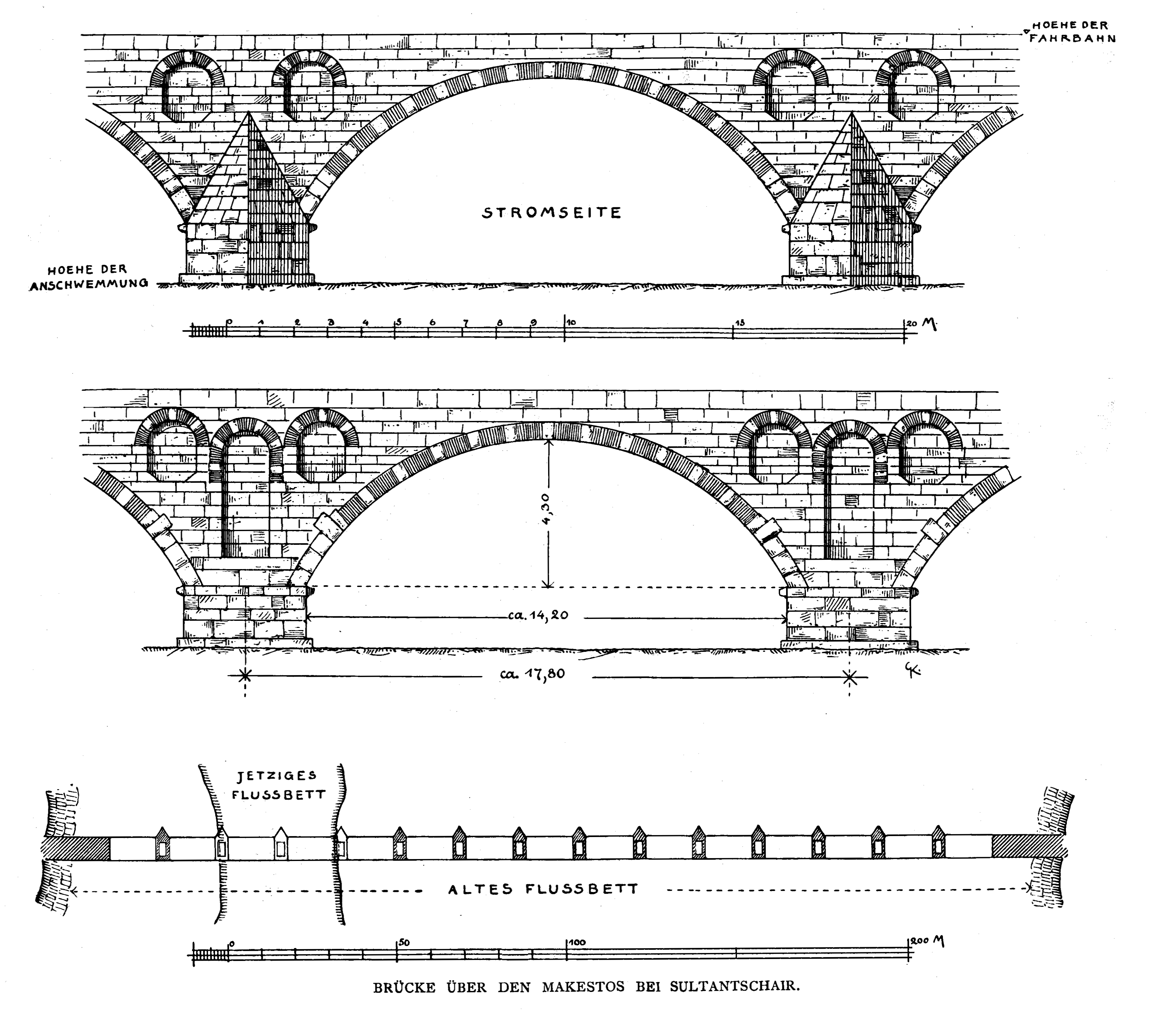
- Elevation and plan of the Macestus Bridge
- Coordinates: 39.865278°N 28.164722°E
- Carries: Hadrianu Therai-Miletopolis road
- Crosses: Simav River (classical Macestus)
- Locale: Mysia

Characteristics
- Design: Half-open spandrel segmental arch bridge
- Material: Stone and brick
- Total length: 234 m (without ramps)
- Width: 6.35 m
- Longest span: 14.20 m
- No. of spans: 13

History
- Construction end: Possibly 4th century AD
- Closed: c. 1870s

The Macestus Bridge or Bridge of Sultançayır was a Roman bridge across the Macestus River (Turkish: Simav or Susurluk Çayı) at Balıkesir, in the northwestern part of modern-day Turkey. Its flattened arches, slender piers and the hollow chamber system documented the progress made in late antique bridge building. A first cursory investigation of the 234 m long structure was conducted in the early 20th century, but since then its existence has been largely neglected by scholars. Current photos from 2009 show that the bridge has collapsed in the meantime.

== Exploration ==
The bridge is located at Sultançayır, in the heart of the ancient region of Mysia, where it carried the road connecting Hadrianu Therai (Balıkesir) with Miletopolis across the Macestus. During an exploration tour in 1902, the German archaeologist Theodor Wiegand found the ancient structure still in an excellent state of preservation; only the fourth pier from the eastern bank had been blown up some thirty years before in what was a crude and ultimately unsuccessful attempt to render the river navigable for larger vessels. Another brief account was given by his English colleague Frederick William Hasluck, who also visited Mysia at the time.

== Construction ==
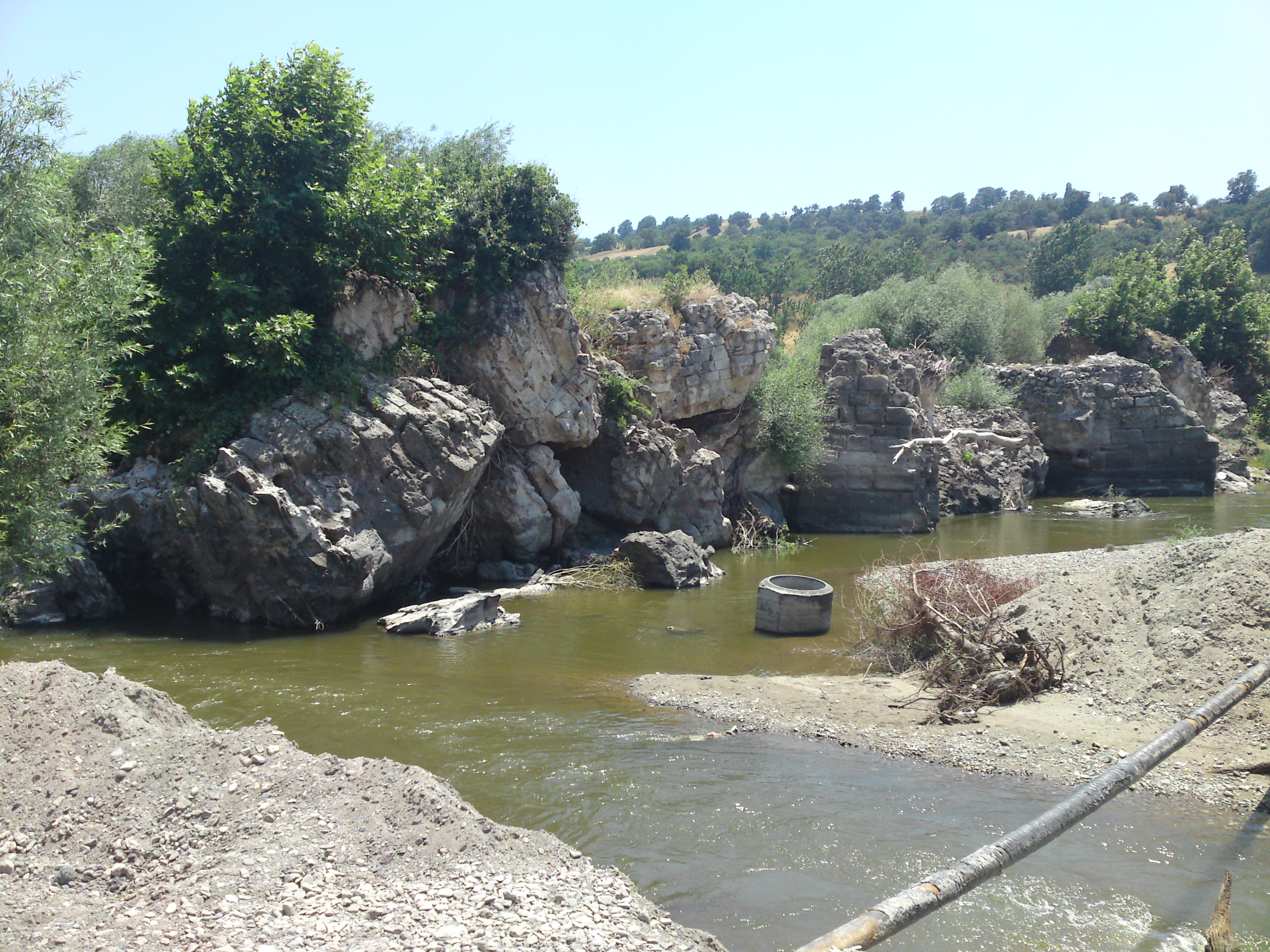
Ruined state of the bridge in 2009

The Macestus Bridge has a width of 6.35 m and a length of 234 m, excluding the ramps at both ends. The distance between the centreline of the piers measures 17.80 m for each of its 13 arches, the clear span being 14.20 m and the pier width, accordingly, 3.60 m. The slender piers are protected upstream by triangular cutwaters and, owing to a favourable thickness against span ratio of almost 1 to 4, allowed the waterflow to pass the bridge relatively unrestricted. The rise from the springing line to the keystone is only 4.30 m (see drawing), giving the arcade a span-to-rise ratio of 3.3 to 1. The bridge is thus one of more than a dozen ancient segmental arch bridges known today.

Inside, hollow chambers were cut out to save material and reduce the weight resting on the arch vaults; these spaces are 4.40 m in width, 2.05 m in length, and are all arranged obliquely to the longitudinal axis of the bridge. Similar hollow chamber constructions are known to exist in other late Roman bridges in Asia Minor, such as the Aesepus Bridge, whose small, slit-like recesses point in the direction of the roadway though.

On the exterior, a pair of arched niches was set into the spandrel wall, with an additional, twice as large niche at the downstream side in between. These half-open spandrels were meant to further relieve the dead load on the bridge. The retaining walls, just as the breakwaters, were built with carefully hewn limestone blocks.

The outer voussoirs of the arch rib are built of alternating bricks and ashlar stones, while the rest of the arch vaults consists entirely out of bricks. Further materials mentioned by Wiegand include marble – probably for facing – and mortar, which could have been used as a binder, or may refer to Roman concrete which often served to fill the interior of the spandrels and the piers. Ancient Spolia were reportedly not used.

== Date ==
The use of flattened arches composed of brick and stone indicates, according to Wiegand, a construction date in the late Roman or early Byzantine period. Hasluck points out architectural parallels with the neighbouring White Bridge and Aesepus Bridge, and dates the Macestus Bridge on that basis to the reign of Constantine the Great († 337 AD). The existence of a late Byzantine fortress, located on a hilltop some 300 m from the bridge, is taken as evidence for a continued use until at least the early 14th century. The present state of the structure is unknown; it is not listed in O'Connor's recent compilation of Roman bridges.

== See also ==
- List of Roman bridges
- Roman architecture
- Roman engineering

== Sources ==
- Hasluck, Frederick William (November 1906), "A Roman Bridge on the Aesepus", The Annual of the British School at Athens, 12: 184–189, doi:10.1017/s0068245400008066
- O’Connor, Colin (1993), Roman Bridges, Cambridge University Press, ISBN 0-521-39326-4
- Wiegand, Theodor (1904), "Reisen in Mysien", Mitteilungen des Deutschen Archäologischen Instituts, Athenische Abteilung, 29: 254–339 (300–301)
