= Caresus River =

River of the ancient Troad

Caresus or Karesos (Ancient Greek: Κάρησος) was a river of the ancient Troad, mentioned by Homer in the Iliad. The river gave name to a mountainous district called Caresene through which it flowed. It flows into the Aesepus River. The Caresus had a considerable valley (αὐλῶν), but less than that of the Aesepus. The Caresus springs between Palaescepsis and Achaeum, which is opposite to the island of Tenedos. There was a town of the same name that ruined before Strabo's time.

Its identification is unknown.
