= Amphilochius of Iconium =

4th-century Anatolian Christian saint

Saint Amphilochius
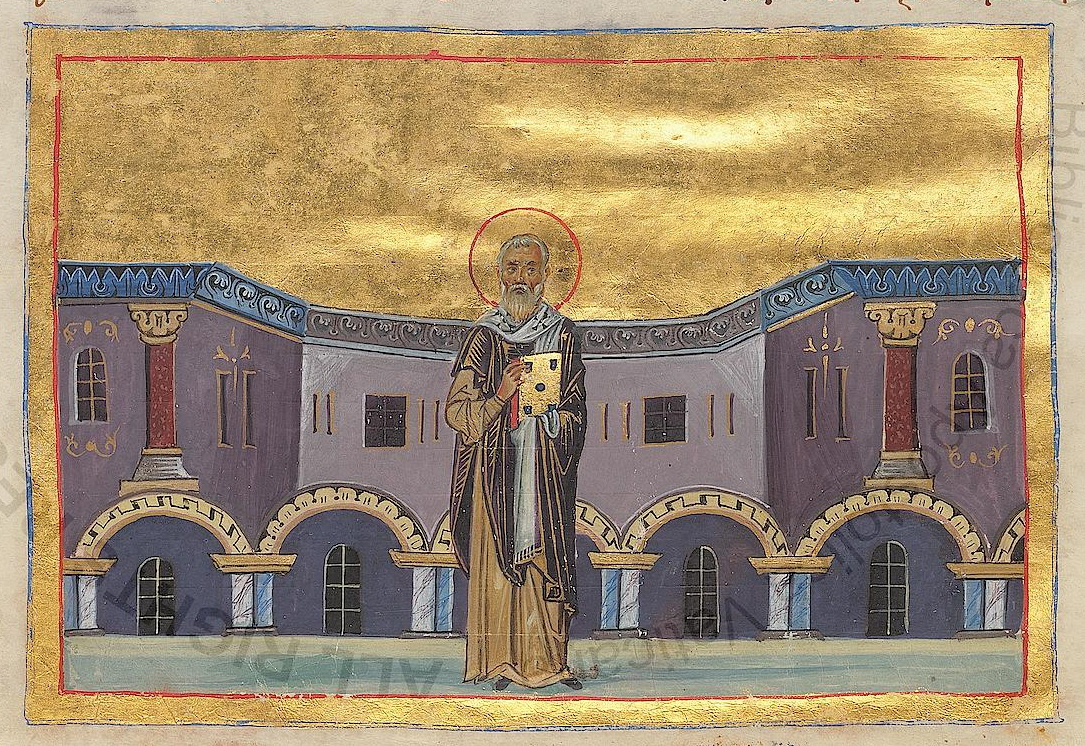
- Saint Amphilochius bishop of Iconium, from the Menologion of Basil II
- Born: ca. 339/340; Caesarea, Cappadocia (modern-day Kayseri, Turkey)
- Died: Iconium, Phrygia (modern-day Konya, Turkey)
- Venerated in: Roman Catholic Church; Eastern Orthodox Church
- Feast: November 22 (Roman Catholic Church), November 23 (Eastern Orthodox Church)
- Patronage: Konya

Amphilochius of Iconium (Greek: Ἀµφιλόχιος Ἰκονίου) was a Christian bishop of the fourth century, son of a Cappadocian family of distinction, born, perhaps at Caesarea, ca. 339/340, died probably 394–403. He is venerated as a saint on November 22 in the Roman Catholic Church and on November 23 in the Orthodox Church.

== Life ==
Amphilochius' father was an eminent lawyer, and his mother Livia was remarkable for gentleness and wisdom. He was probably first cousin to Gregory of Nazianzus, and was brought up in the peculiarly religious atmosphere of the Christian aristocracy of his native province. He studied law in Antioch with Libanius, practised at Constantinople, but soon retired to lead a religious life in the vicinity of his friend and relative, the "theologian" of Nazianzus.

He was soon drawn within the circle of influence around Basil of Caesarea, and seems to have been for a while a member of the Christian "City of the Poor" that Basil had built at Cæsarea. Early in 374 he was bishop of the important see of Iconium, probably placed there by Basil, whom he continued to aid in Cappadocian ecclesiastical affairs until Basil's death (379). Thenceforth he remained in close relations with Gregory of Nazianzus, and accompanied him to the Council of Constantinople (381), where Jerome met and conversed with him (De Vir. Ill., c. 133).

In the history of theology he occupies a place of prominence for his defence of the divinity of the Holy Spirit against the Macedonians. It was to him that Basil dedicated his work "On the Holy Spirit". He wrote a similar work, now lost. We know, however, that he read it to Jerome on the occasion of their meeting at Constantinople.

His attitude towards Arianism is illustrated by the well-known anecdote concerning his audience with Theodosius I and his son Arcadius. When the Emperor rebuked him for ignoring the presence of his son, he reminded him that the Lord of the universe abhorreth those who are ungrateful towards His Son, their Saviour and Benefactor.

He was very energetic against the Messalians, and contributed to the extirpation of that group. Basil, who appointed him to his bishopric, had a high opinion of Amphilochius. In the next generation Theodoret described him in very flattering terms, and he is quoted by councils as late as 787. Jerome also includes him as one of the Cappadocians in a list of Christian exemplars of secular erudition. Because Amphilochius only started to study theology after he became a bishop, his work retains a certain simplicity. According to Georges Florovsky, it becomes evident in his theological writing that he had no philosophical background or particular interest in it. His writing was contingent upon his needs as a pastor and teacher in the struggle against heresy. That said, Florovsky also praises his writing as "inspired by a calm and sincere faith" and his homiletic use of rhetoric, describing it as "reminiscent of Gregory the Theologian."

== Works ==
Most of Amphilochius' work has been lost. Eight homilies have survived, including the oldest known sermon on the Feast of the Purification of the Lord (In Occursum Domini). The Oration at Midpentecost (In Mesopentocostem), refers to the feast of Mid-Pentecost. His style and concern for historical accuracy puts Amphilochius in the place of predecessor to John Chrysostom, who may have been influenced by him. In addition to his homilies, there is also an epistle to the council of Iconium of 376, and a didactic work (of questionable authenticity) Epistula Iambica ad Seleucum. The spurious "Iambics to Seleucus" offers an early and important catalogue of the canonical writings; other spurious fragments, current under his name, are taken from scriptural discourses, dogmatic letters and controversial writings. The polemical treatise Against False Asceticism of Amphilochius of Iconium is expressly directed against the beliefs and practices of the ‘Encratites’ and ‘Apotactites’ of rural Lycaonia. It seems to be written in the second half of the 370s.

His only genuine extant work is, according to Bardenhewer, the "Epistola Synodica", a letter against the Macedonian heresy in the name of the bishops of Lycaonia, and probably addressed to the bishops of Lycia.

== Thought ==
Amphilochius' theology typically follows in the footsteps of his Cappadocian peers, and he defines the Trinity by the hypostatic properties of the Son as generation and the Spirit as procession. He does, however, innovate in designating the hypostases with a new phrase, "mode of being" (τρόποι τῆς ὺπάρξεως). This expression had not been used by the Cappadocian Fathers and was a step toward understanding the Trinity with language not aimed at essence, but relations. By the beginning of the fifth century, this phrase was generally accepted in theological uses.

Besides his Trinitarian thought, Amphilochius also anticipated later theological usage with his Christological terminology of "hypostasis." In his insistence on the human nature of Christ, he was led to conclude that Christ had two wills and two natures.

== See also ==
- Saint Amphilochius (Konya)

== Editions ==
- G. Ficker, Amphilochiana, I. Teil (Leipzig, 1906).
- C. Datema, Amphilochii Iconiensis Opera, Turnhout, Brepols 1978 (Corpus Christianorum, Series Graeca, 3).

== Studies ==
- K. Holl, Amphilochius von Ikonium in seinem Verhältnis zu den grossen Kappadoziern (Tübingen, 1904).
- C. Bonis, ‘The heresies combatted in Amphilochios’ “Regarding False Asceticism”’, Greek Orthodox Theological Review, 9,1 (1963), 79–96.
- E. Rossin, ‘Anfilochio di Iconio e il canone biblico “Contra Haereticos”’, Studia Patavina 43,2 (1996), 131–157.
