= Doğancı-1 Dam =

Coordinates: 40.1134°N 28.9637°E

- Location: Turkey
- Construction began: 1977
- Opening date: 1983

Dam and spillways
- Height: 85 meters

Doğancı-1 Dam is a dam in Bursa, Turkey. The development was backed by the Turkish State Hydraulic Works. Dam construction was begun in 1977, and was finished in 1983, and the dam is still in use.

== See also ==
- List of dams and reservoirs in Turkey
