= White Bridge (Mysia) =

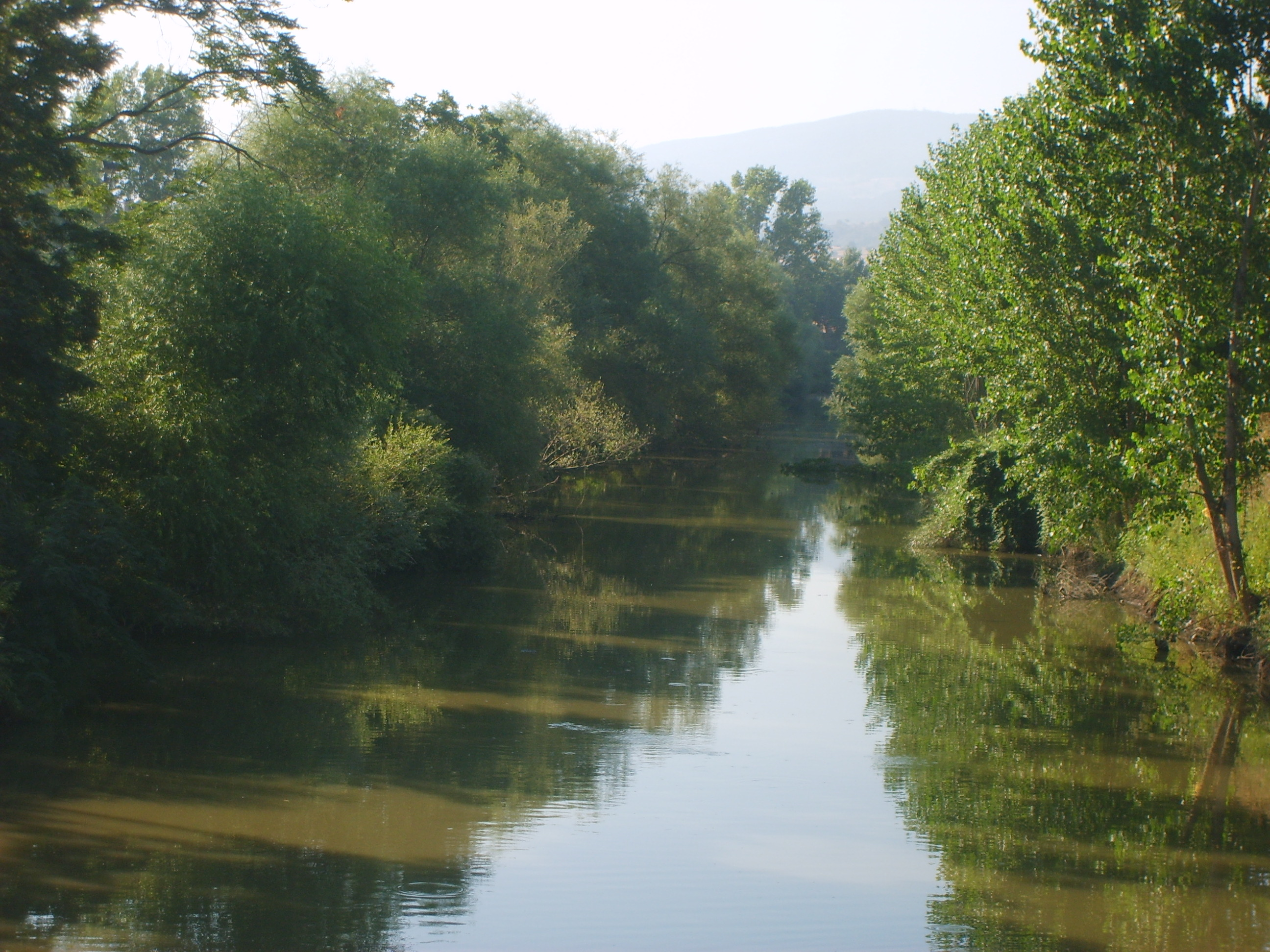
- The river Granicus, which was once spanned by the bridge
- Coordinates: 40°22′21″N 27°18′36″E
- Carries: Road to Gallipoli
- Crosses: Granicus
- Locale: Mysia, Turkey

Characteristics
- Design: Arch bridge
- Material: Brick, marble, stone?
- Width: 8 paces
- Longest span: 18 paces
- No. of spans: 8 (incl. floodways)

History
- Construction end: Presumably 4th century AD

The White Bridge (Turkish: Akköprü) was a Roman bridge across the river Granicus in Mysia in the north west of modern-day Turkey. Presumably constructed in the 4th century AD, it belonged in Ottoman times to the important road to Gallipoli on the Dardanelles. The structure was praised by early European travellers for its fine construction and marble facing, but was plundered for building material during the 19th century.

== Exploration ==
The White Bridge was first mentioned by Edmund Chishull in 1699, who found it still intact. Later visitors included William Turner in 1815, Pyotr Chikhachyov in 1847 and Arthur W. Janke in the 1890s, who all judged the structure to be of ancient origin.

Turner described a very magnificent Roman bridge of brick and small stones with retaining walls of fine marble. It consisted of eight arches, the largest four spanning the river, flanked by two smaller openings at each bank. The span of the largest vault was eighteen paces, its width eight. Small arched chambers immediately under the pavement reduced the load of the bridge; similar relieving chambers also appear in neighbouring ancient bridges such as the Makestos Bridge and the Aesepus Bridge, leading Frederick William Hasluck to postulate a common origin under the reign of emperor Constantine († 337 AD).

Eighty years later, Janke could still identify several semi-circular arches at the left bank, along with piers featuring polished ashlar of 100 × 50 cm, as characteristically for Roman bridge building. Hardly a decade later, however, Hasluck essentially only found a tile-vaulted arch of the western abutment and an adjoining pier, the bridge having been plundered in the meantime for building material for the Karabogha–Boghashehr (Turkish: Karaboğa-Boğazşehir) road. The span could still be established as 2.70 m (8.9 ft), the width of the roadway as 7.40 m (24.3 ft). The remaining upper parts showed carelessly executed Turkish repairs with rough rubble and tiles.

The current state of the remains of the White Bridge is unknown; it is not listed in O’Connor's compilation of Roman bridges.

== See also ==
- List of Roman bridges
- Roman architecture
- Roman engineering

== Sources ==
- Hasluck, Frederick William (1906), "A Roman Bridge on the Aesepus", The Annual of the British School at Athens, vol. 12, pp. 184–189
- Janke, Arthur W. (1904), Auf Alexanders des grossen Pfaden: Eine Reise durch Kleinasien (in German), Weidran
- O’Connor, Colin (1993), Roman Bridges, Cambridge University Press, ISBN 0-521-39326-4
