= Argyria (Troad) =

Town located in the ancient Troad

Coordinates: 39°45′01″N 27°13′20″E

Argyria (Ancient Greek: Ἀργυρία) was a town situated on the ancient Troad, on the right bank of the Aesepus River (modern Gönen Çay) near Scepsis. It was noted for its silver mines, from which the town derived its name (ἄργυρος is Greek for 'silver'). Strabo further describes its location as being at the foot of Mount Ida near the source of the Aesepus.

Its site is located near Karaidin Maden (Gümüş Maden) in Asiatic Turkey.
