= Aesepus River =

River in Çanakkale, Turkey

Coordinates: 40°19′20″N 27°38′05″E

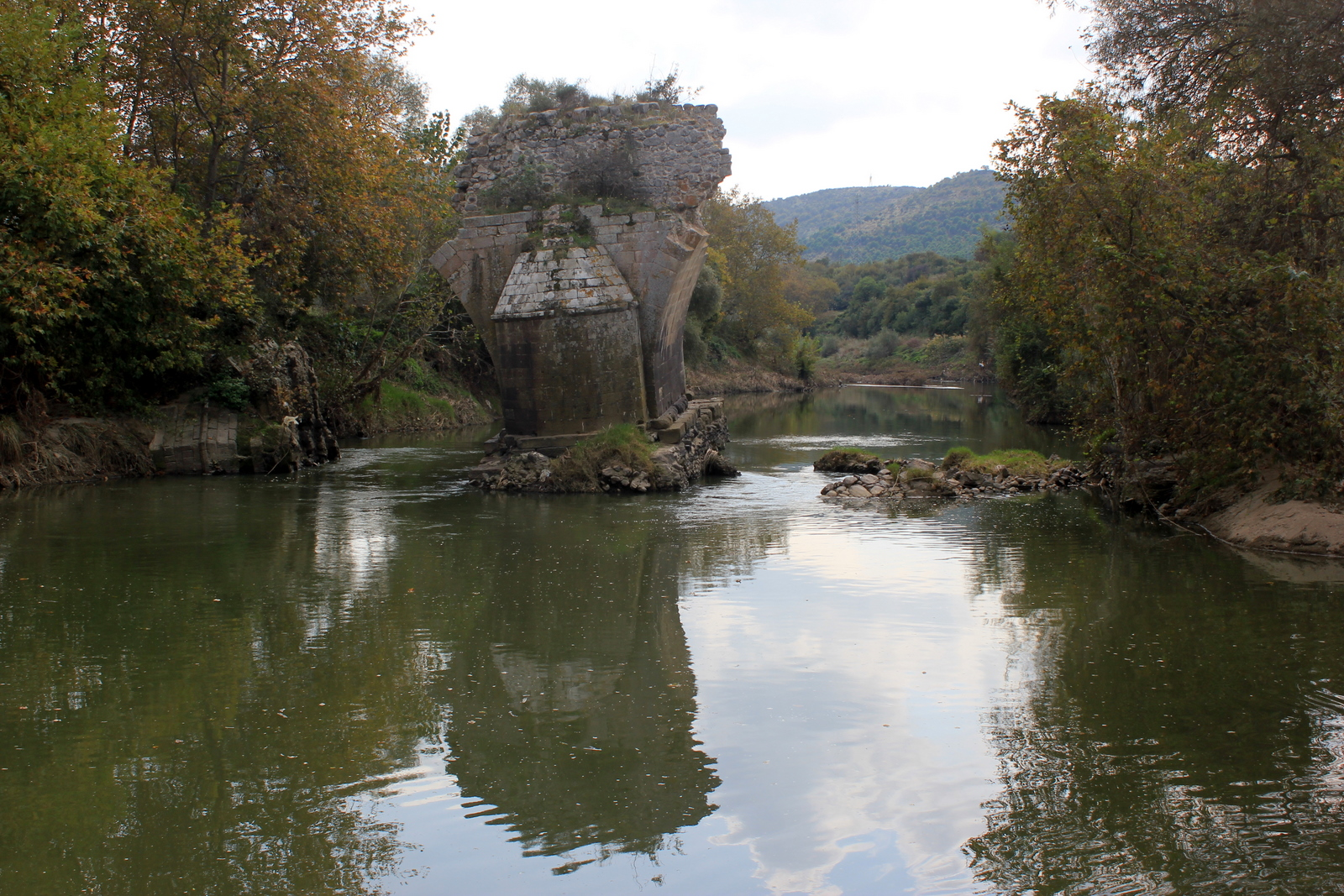
The Aesepus River

The Aesepus River or Aisepos River (Ancient Greek: ἡ Αἴσηπος) was a river of Northern Mysia.

== Description ==
The river was mentioned by Homer in the Iliad as flowing past Zeleia, at the foot of Ida; and in another passage as one of the streams that flow from Ida. According to Strabo's interpretation of Homer, the Aesepus was the eastern boundary of Mysia. The Aesepus is the largest river of Mysia. According to Strabo, it rises in Mount Cotylus, one of the summits of Ida, and the distance between its source and its outlet is near 500 stadia. It is joined on the left bank by the Caresus, another stream which flows from Cotylus; and then taking a northeasterly and northerly course, it enters the Propontis, between the mouth of the Granicus River and the city of Cyzicus.

The modern name is Gönen Çay.

== See also ==
- Aesepus Bridge
