= Mustafakemalpaşa River =

River in northwestern Anatolia in the Bursa Province of Turkey

Coordinates: 40.2125°N 28.3978°E

The Mustafakemalpaşa River, Orhaneli River or Adirnaz River (Turkish: Mustafakemalpaşa Çayı, Orhaneli Çayı or Adırnaz Çayı) is a river in northwestern Anatolia in the Bursa Province of Turkey's Marmara region. It is named for the city of Mustafakemalpaşa which lies near its delta onto Lake Uluabat.

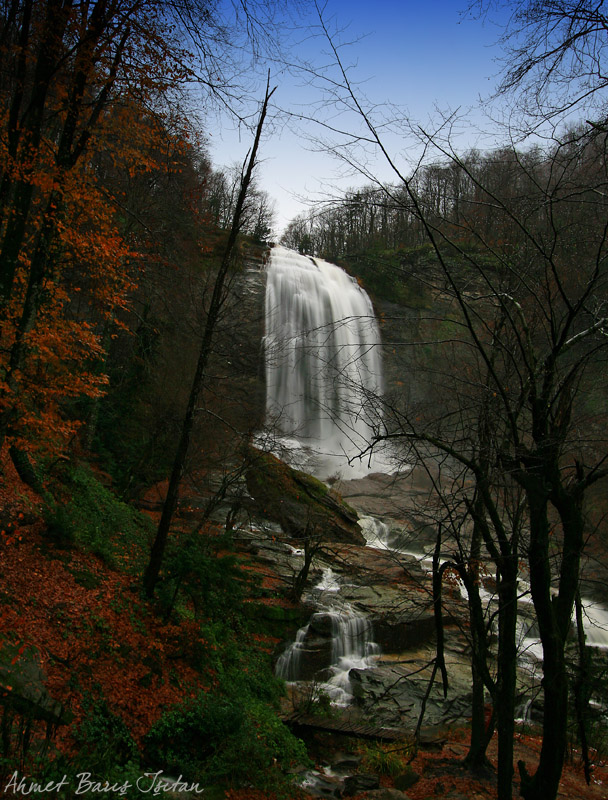
Suuçtu Waterfall, Mustafakemalpaşa River

In antiquity, the river was known as Rhyndacus (Greek: Ῥύνδακος, Rhýndakos). In Greek Mythology, Rhyndacus was a son of Oceanus and Tethys, and his daughters by Mount Didymos, the Rhyndacides, were revered as pegaeæ, meaning water-Springs. In his Dionysiaca, Nonnus recorded their waters being used by Dionysus to drug the nymph Nicaea after she offended the Rhyndacides by murdering the shepherd Hymnus. Upon recovering her senses, she then cursed them. Although the Rhyndacus was formerly the main artery running to the Sea of Marmara and served as the border between Mysia and Bithynia, today the Mustafakemalpaşa is merely a tributary of the Simav, which then flows into the Sea of Marmara.

During the First Mithridatic War, Flavius Fimbria defeated Mithridates VI of Pontus's forces under his son also known as Mithridates along the Rhyndacus in 85 BC. During the third, Lucullus again defeated him at the Rhyndacus in 73 or 72 BC. Under Manuel I, the Byzantine Empire based their main Anatolian army at Lopadion (modern Uluabat) on the Rhyndacus. After the sack of Constantinople during the Fourth Crusade, the Latin emperor Henry won another battle there against the Nicaean Empire on October 15, 1211.

== See also ==
- Constantine's Bridge
- Penkalas Bridge
