= Simav River =

River in Balıkesir, Turkey

Coordinates: 39°N 29°E

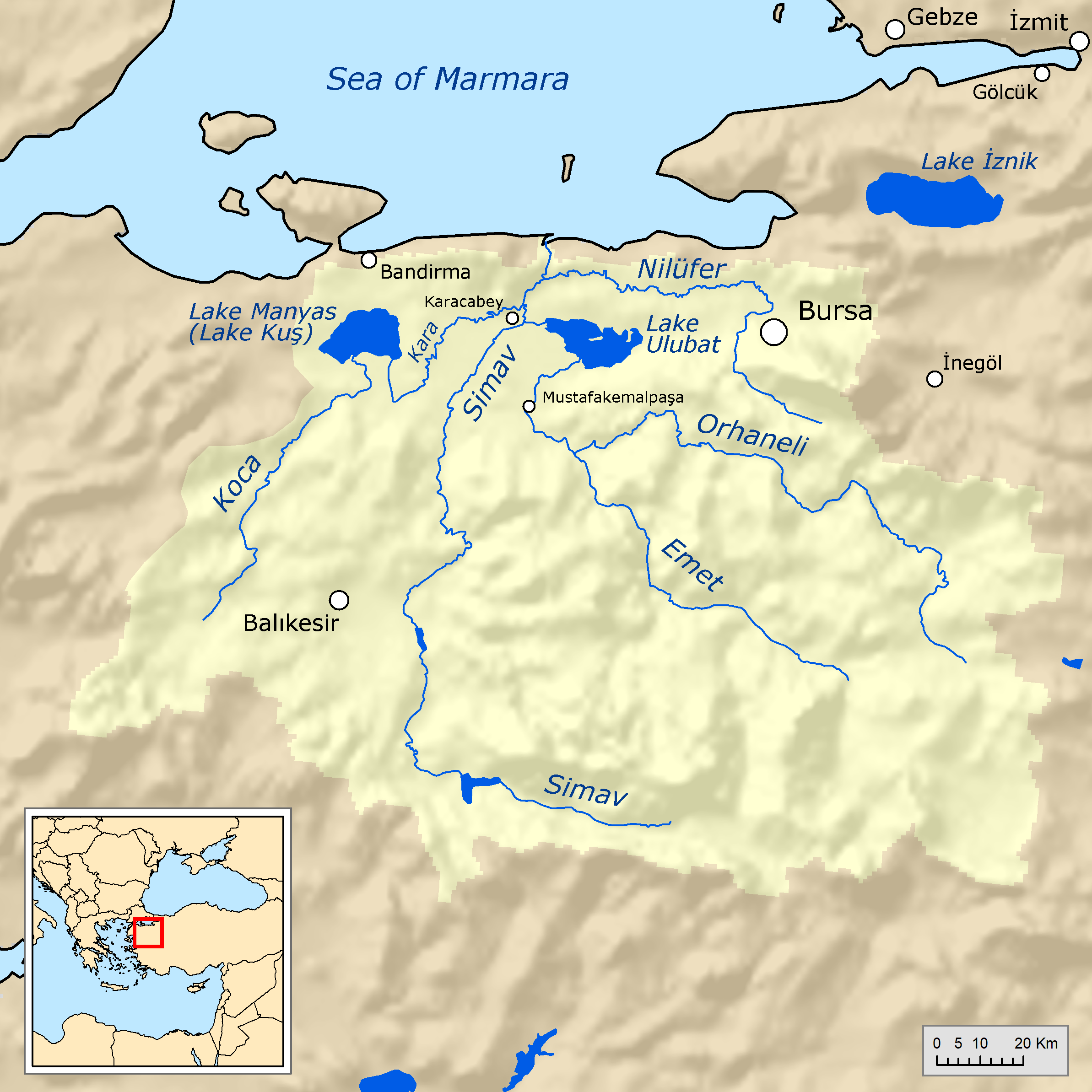
Map of the Simav River basin

The Simav (Turkish: Simav Çayı) or Susurluk River (Susurluk Çayı) is a river in Anatolian Turkey. Its course is 321 km long and its basin comprises 22,400 km^{2}. It was the classical Macestus (/məˈsɛstəs/; Greek: Μέκεστος, Mékestos). In the 19th century, it was known as the Mikalick.

The Simav has its source in Kütahya Province, from which it flows north across the plain of Simav into Balıkesir Province. There is a reservoir at the Çaygören Dam, out of which the Simav flows past Susurluk and meets the Adirnaz. During the classical period, the Macestus was a tributary of the Rhyndacus (the modern Adirnaz), but today the Simav forms the main course from their confluence near Karacabey down to the Sea of Marmara. Along the way, it meets the Nilüfer River (the classical Odrysses).

Its mouth faces the island of Imrali, a high-security prison.
