= Biga Çayı =

River in Turkey

Biga River
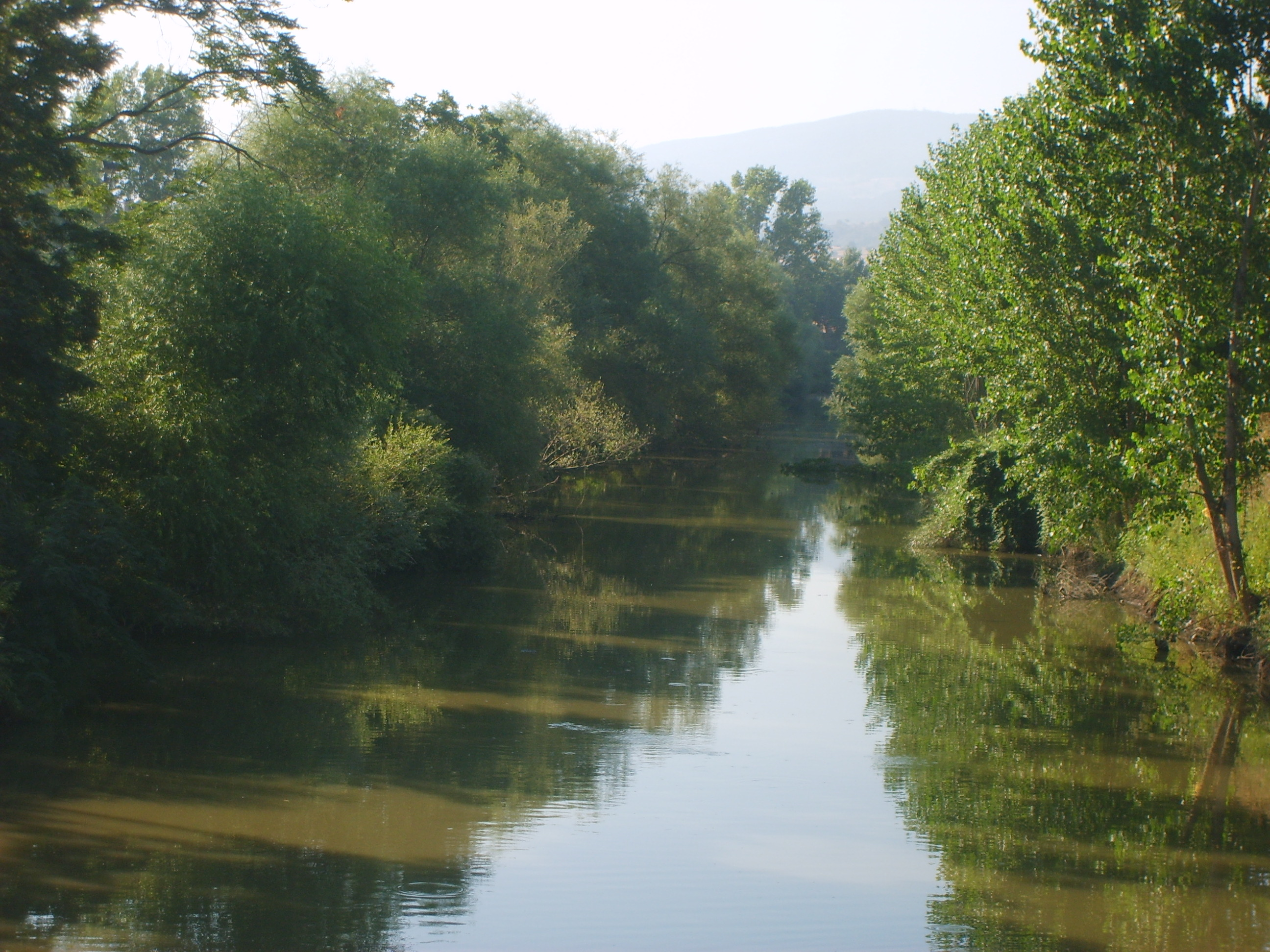
- Biga River

Physical characteristics
- Source
  - location: Kaz Dağı
- Mouth
  - location: Sea of Marmara
- Length: 80 km (50 mi)

The Biga River (Turkish: Biga Çayı) is a small river in Çanakkale Province in northwestern Turkey. The river begins at the base of Mount Ida and trends generally northeasterly to the Sea of Marmara. It is about 50 kilometres (31 mi) east of the Dardanelles. It flows past the towns of Çan and Biga and enters the Sea of Marmara at Karabiga. It is also known as the Çan (Çan Çayı) and the Kocabaş (Kocabaş Çayı).

The Biga was the classical Granicus (Ancient Greek: Γρανικὸς ποταμός, Granikòs Potamós). Cephalon (FGrHist 45 F 5.) wrote that the river named after Graecus (Γραικός).

The banks near the modern-day town of Biga were the site of the Battle of the Granicus, fought in 334 BC between the Macedonian army of Alexander the Great and the forces of the Persian Empire of Darius III. This was Alexander's first victory over the Persians. In antiquity, the river was described as having strong, turbulent current, with steep banks and varying depth.

There is also a valley named in its honor on Mars. The Granicus Valles is at 29.72° N, 131.0° E and runs for 750 kilometres (470 mi).
