= Mysia =

Historical region in the northwest of ancient Asia Minor

Coordinates: 40.0°N 28.5°E

- Ancient Region of Anatolia
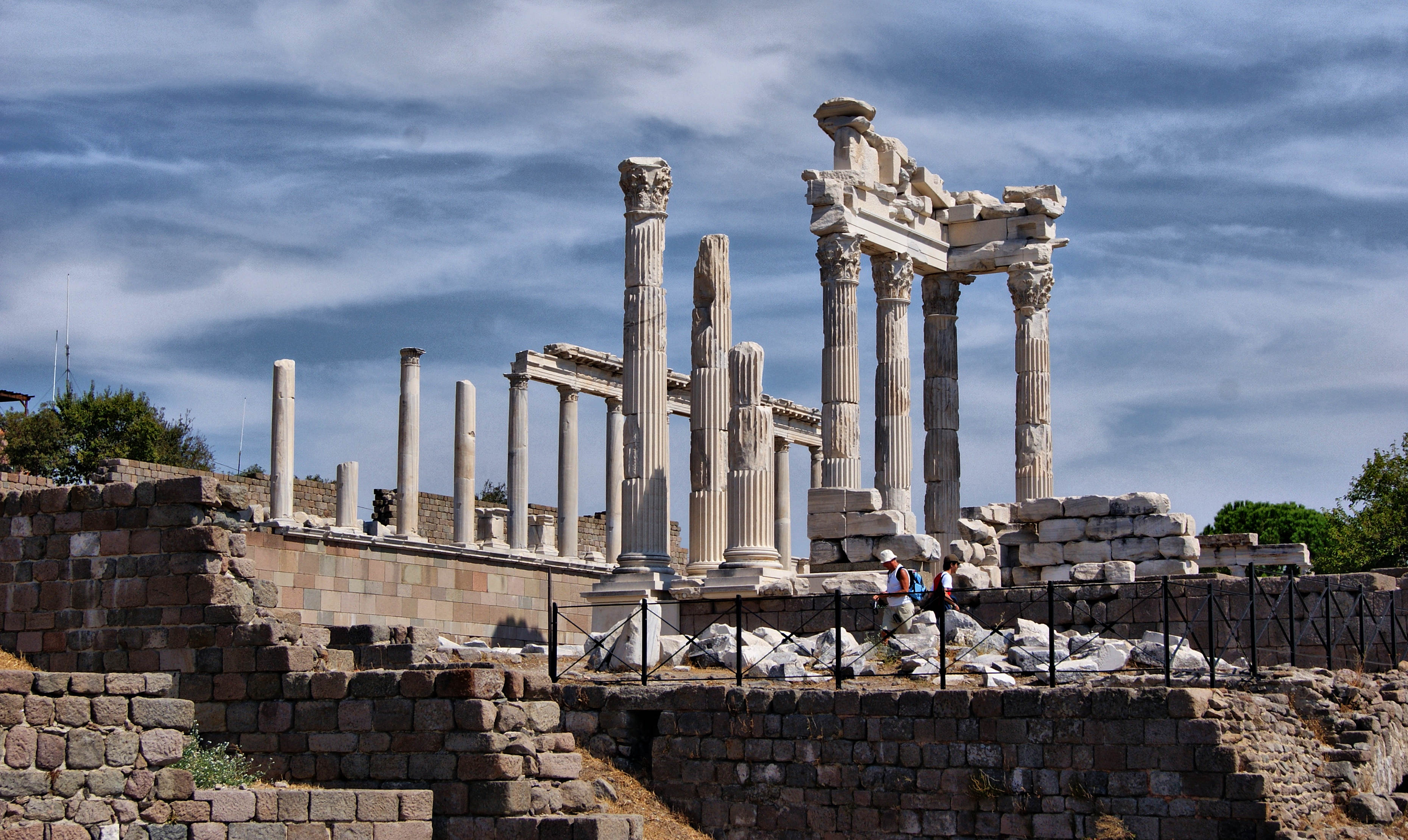
- Acropolis of Pergamon
- Location: North-western Anatolia
- Largest city: Pergamon
- Inhabitants: Mysians
- Language: Mysian
- Achaemenid satrapy: Phrygia
- Roman province: Asia
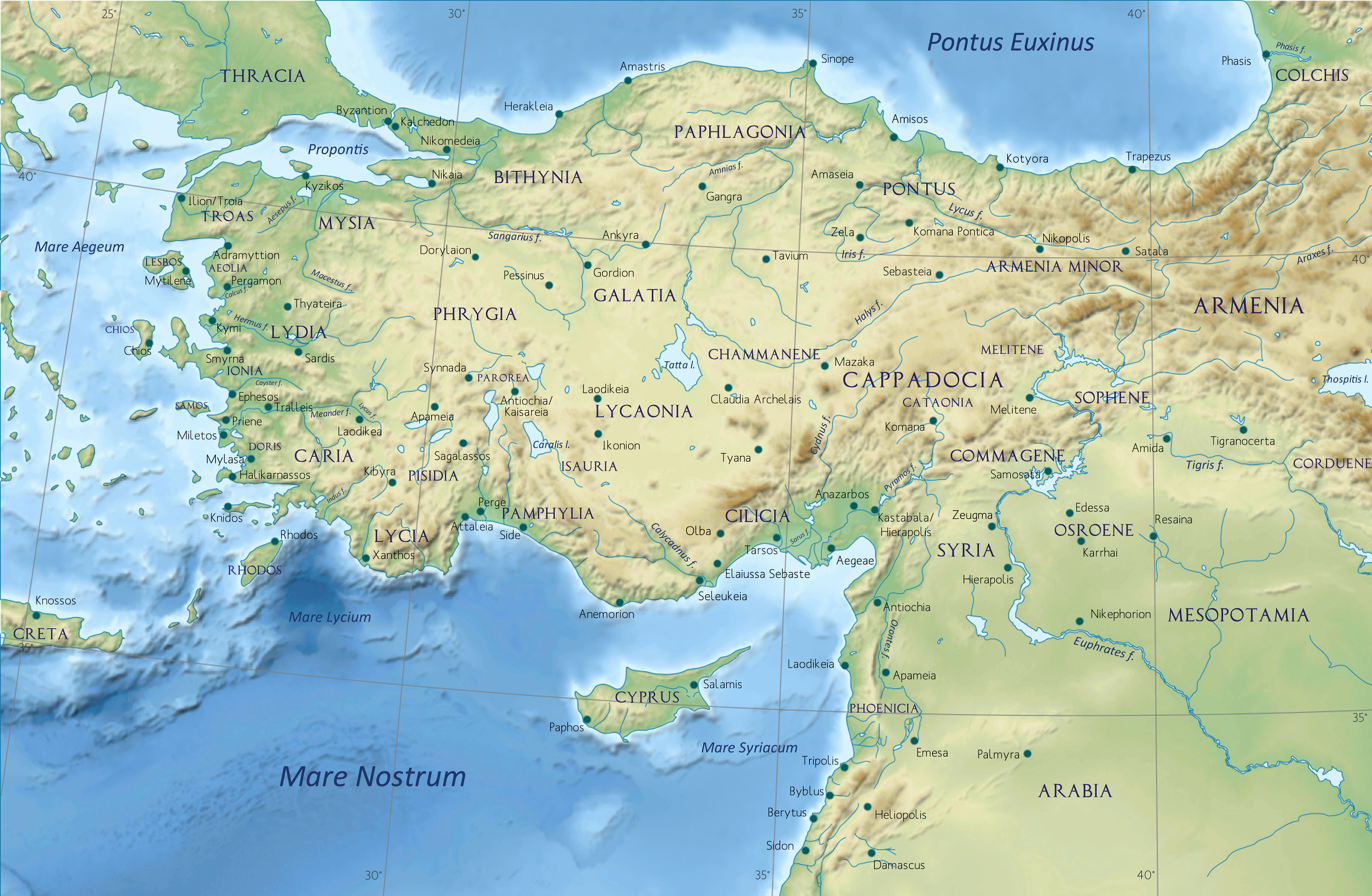
- Anatolia/Asia Minor in the Greco-Roman period. The classical regions, including Mysia, and their main settlements

Mysia (UK /ˈmɪsiə/, US /ˈmɪʒə/ or /ˈmiːʒə/; Greek: Μυσία; Latin: Mysia; Turkish: Misya) was a region in the northwest of ancient Asia Minor (Anatolia, Asian part of modern Turkey). It was located on the south coast of the Sea of Marmara. It was bounded by Bithynia on the east, Phrygia on the southeast, Lydia on the south, Aeolis on the southwest, Troad on the west, and the Propontis on the north. In ancient times it was inhabited by the Mysians, Phrygians, Aeolian Greeks and other groups.

== Geography ==
The precise limits of Mysia are difficult to assign. The Phrygian frontier was fluctuating, while in the northwest the Troad was only sometimes included in Mysia. The northern portion was known as "Lesser Phrygia" or (Ancient Greek: μικρὰ Φρυγία, romanized: mikra Phrygia; Latin: Phrygia Minor), while the southern was called "Greater Phrygia" or "Pergamene Phrygia". Mysia was in later times also known as Hellespontine Phrygia (Ancient Greek: Ἑλλησποντιακὴ Φρυγία, romanized: Hellespontiake Phrygia; Latin: Phrygia Hellespontica) or "Acquired Phrygia" (Ancient Greek: ἐπίκτητος Φρυγία, romanized: epiktetos Phrygia; Latin: Phrygia Epictetus), so named when the region was annexed to the Attalid kingdom.

Under Augustus, Mysia occupied the whole of the northwest corner of Asia Minor, between the Hellespont and the Propontis to the north, Bithynia and Phrygia to the east, Lydia to the south, and the Aegean Sea to the west.

=== Land and elevation ===
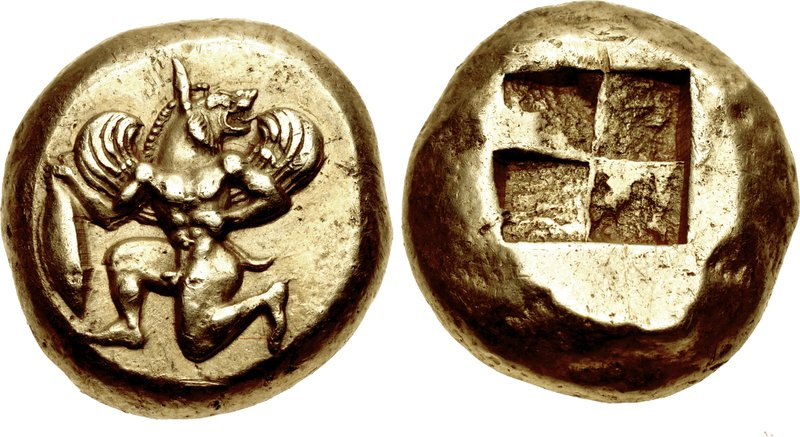
Coin of Kyzikos, Mysia. Circa 550–500 BC

The chief physical features of Mysia are the two mountains—Mount Olympus at (7600 ft) in the north and Mount Temnus in the south, which for some distance separates Mysia from Lydia and afterwards prolonged through Mysia to the neighbourhood of the Gulf of Adramyttium. The major rivers in the northern part of the province are the Macestus and its tributary the Rhyndacus, both of which rise in Phrygia and, after diverging widely through Mysia, unite their waters below the lake of Apolloniatis about 15 miles (24 km) from the Propontis. The Caïcus in the south rises in Temnus, and from thence flows westward to the Aegean Sea, passing within a few miles of Pergamon. In the northern portion of the province are two considerable lakes, Artynia or Apolloniatis (Abulliont Geul) and Aphnitis (Maniyas Geul), which discharge their waters into the Macestus from the east and west respectively.

=== Cities ===
The most important cities were Pergamon in the valley of the Caïcus, and Cyzicus on the Propontis. The whole sea-coast was studded with Greek towns, several of which were places of considerable importance; thus the northern portion included Parium, Lampsacus and Abydos, and the southern Assos, Adramyttium. Further south, on the Eleatic Gulf, were Elaea, Myrina and Cyme.

== History ==
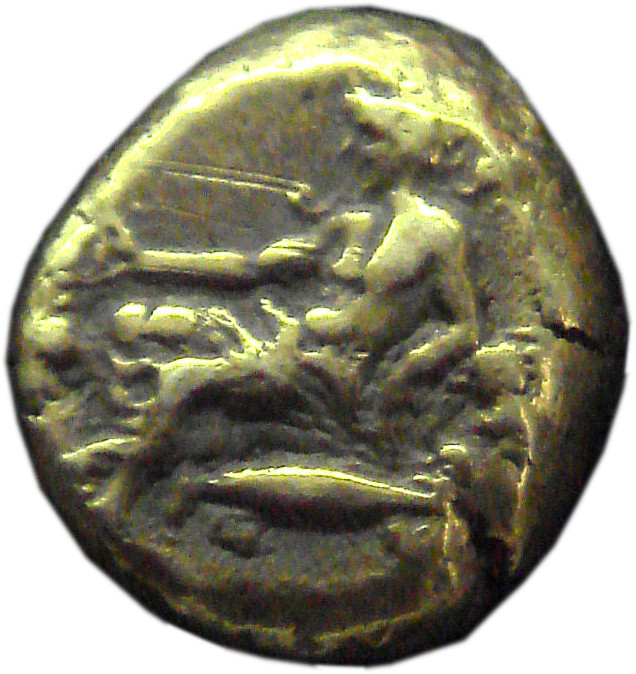
Coin of Mysia, 4th century BC

A minor episode in the Trojan War cycle in Greek mythology has the Greek fleet land at Mysia, mistaking it for Troy. Achilles wounds their king, Telephus, after he slays a Greek; Telephus later pleads with Achilles to heal the wound. This coastal region ruled by Telephus is alternatively named "Teuthrania" in Greek mythology, as it was previously ruled by King Teuthras. In the Iliad, Homer represents the Mysians as allies of Troy, with the Mysian forces led by Ennomus (a prophet) and Chromius, sons of Arsinous. Homeric Mysia appears to have been much smaller in extent than historical Mysia, and did not extend north to the Hellespont or the Propontis. Homer does not mention any cities or landmarks in Mysia, and it is not clear exactly where Homeric Mysia was situated, although it was probably located somewhere between the Troad (to the northwest of Mysia) and Lydia/Maeonia (to its south).

A number of Mysian inscriptions have survived in a dialect of the Phrygian language, written using a variant of the Phrygian alphabet. There are also a small number of references to a Lutescan language indigenous to Mysia in Aeolic Greek sources.

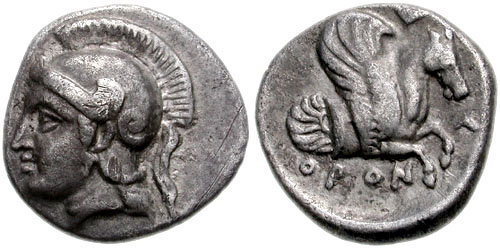
Coin of Orontes as Satrap of Mysia, Adramyteion – c. 357–352 BC

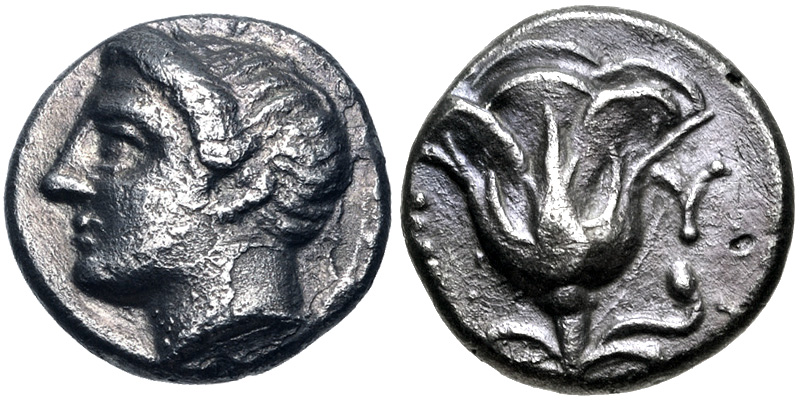
Coinage of Memnon of Rhodes, Mysia. Mid-4th century BC

Under the Persian Achaemenid Empire, the northwest corner of Asia Minor, still occupied by Phrygians but mainly by Aeolians, was called "Phrygia Minor" – and by the Greeks "Hellespontos".

After Rome's defeat of Antiochus the Great in the Roman-Syrian War of 192 to 188 BC, the area, which had been held by the Diadoch Seleucid Empire, passed to Rome's ally, the Attalid kingdom, and, on the death of King Attalus III in 133 BC, to Rome itself, which made it part of the province of Asia and, later, a separate proconsular Roman province, called "Hellespontus".

According to the Acts of the Apostles, the apostles Paul, Silas and Timothy came to (or passed by) Mysia during Paul's second missionary journey. The narrative suggests that they were uncertain where to travel during this part of the journey, being "forbidden by the Holy Spirit to preach the word in Asia". Shortly afterwards Paul had a vision of a "man of Macedonia" who invited the apostles to travel westwards to Macedonia.

== Ancient bridges ==
The remains of several Roman bridges can still be found:

- Aesepus Bridge across the Aesepus (today Gönen Çayı)
- Constantine's Bridge across the Rhyndacus (Adırnas Çayı)
- Makestos Bridge across the Makestos (Susurluk Çayı)
- White Bridge across the Granicus (Biga Çayı)

== See also ==
- Aeolis
- Ancient regions of Anatolia
- Mysian language
- Mysians
- Telephus
