= Eurymedon =

Eurymedon may refer to:

== Historical figures ==
- Eurymedon (strategos) (died 413 BC), one of the Athenian generals (strategoi) during the Peloponnesian War
- Eurymedon of Myrrhinus, married Plato's sister, Potone; he was the father of Speusippus
- Eurymedon the hierophant, the representative of Eleusinian Demetra; together with the school of Isocrates and Demophilos they brought a charge of impiety against Aristotle

== Greek mythology ==
- Eurymedon (mythology)

== Geography ==
- Eurymedon River, now Köprüçay River
- Eurymedon Bridge (Aspendos), over this river at Aspendos
- Eurymedon Bridge (Selge), over this river at Selge

== Other uses ==
- 5012 Eurymedon, asteroid
- The Eurymedon, alternative name for New Zealand Shipping Co. Ltd. v. A. M. Satterthwaite & Co. Ltd. court case
- Eurymedon vase, an Attic red-figure oinochoe, a wine jug attributed to the circle of the Triptolemos Painter made ca. 460 BC, which is now in the Museum für Kunst und Gewerbe Hamburg (1981.173)

== See also ==
- Battle of the Eurymedon (466 BC), a double battle, taking place both on water and land, between the Delian League of Athens and her Allies, and the Persian Empire of Xerxes I
- Battle of the Eurymedon (190 BC), fought in 190 BC (approximate coordinates: 36°49'00"N, 31°10'20"E) between a Seleucid fleet and the navy of the city state of Rhodes, who were allied with the Roman Republic
