= Köprülü Canyon =

National park in Turkey

Köprülü Canyon National Park
- Köprülü Kanyon Milli Parkı
- IUCN category II (national park)
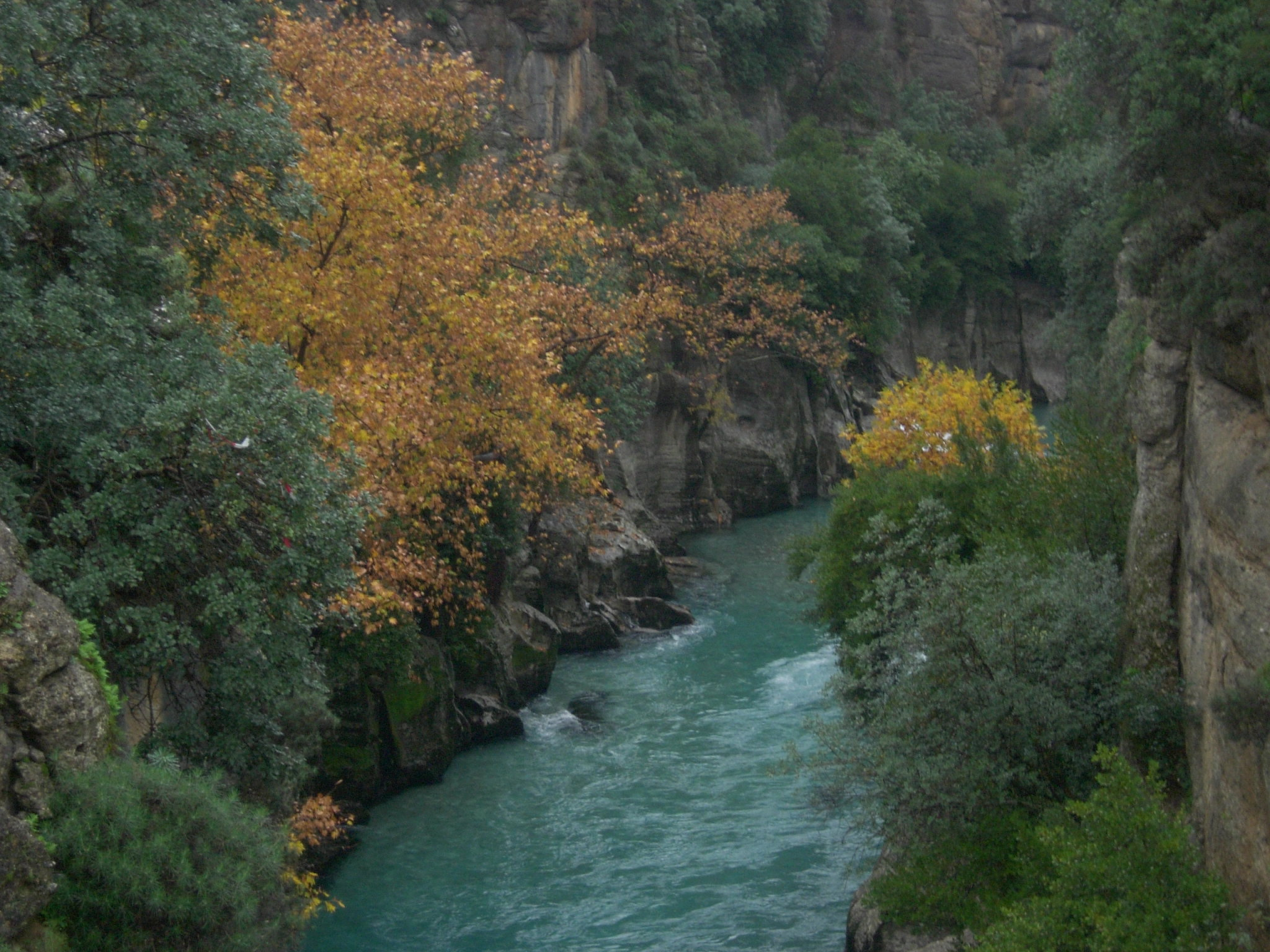
- Köprülü Canyon in Sütçüler, Isparta

- Location within Turkey
- Location: Manavgat, Antalya Province, Turkey
- Nearest city: Antalya
- Coordinates: 37°11′32″N 31°10′51″E
- Area: 366 km^{2} (141 mi^{2})
- Established: December 12, 1973; 52 years ago
- Governing body: Directorate-General of Nature Protection and National Parks; Ministry of Environment and Forest

Köprülü Canyon (Turkish: Köprülü Kanyon) is a canyon and a National Park in the Province of Antalya, Turkey. Covering an area of 366 km^{2} (141 mi^{2}), it was established as a national park by the Ministry of Agriculture and Forestry on December 12, 1973.

== History ==
Within the park are the ruins of the ancient Greco-Roman city of Selge, as well as the intact Eurymedon Bridge, called Oluk Köprü in Turkish.

== Geography ==
The park is situated inside the province of Antalya in the district of Manavgat. The canyon is located 92 km (57 mi) northeast from Antalya City. The canyon's walls are as high as 100m (328 feet) and stretch for 14 km (8.7 mi) along the Köprü River.
