= Thomas Broderick =

Thomas Broderick S.M.A.
- Apostolic Vicar of Western Nigeria
- Church: Catholic Church
- See: Apostolic Vicariate of Western Nigeria
- In office: 24 August 1918 – 13 October 1933
- Predecessor: Carlo Zappa
- Successor: Leo Hale Taylor
- Other post: Titular Bishop of Petnelissus (1918-1933)

Orders
- Ordination: 15 July 1906 by Paul Pellet
- Consecration: 8 December 1918 by Charles O'Sullivan

Personal details
- Born: 23 December 1882 Kilflynn, County Kerry, United Kingdom of Great Britain and Ireland
- Died: 13 October 1933 (aged 50) Genoa, Province of Genoa, Kingdom of Italy

Thomas Broderick, SMA (23 December 1882 – 13 October 1933) was an Irish born priest, a member of the Society of African Missions, who served as Vicar Apostolic of Western Nigeria.

Broderick was born in Kilflynn in North Kerry. He was educated at the SMA St. Joseph's College, Wilton, Cork, before completing his clerical training in Lyon, France.

In 1906. shortly after ordination, Broderick left for the Gold Coast (Ghana). In 1908 he returned to Ireland as director of the new Sacred Heart College, Ballinafad, a juniorate (a preparatory secondary school). With the setting up of the Irish SMA seminary in Blackrock, Co. Cork, Broderick was appointed its first Rector.

Broderick was ordained Titular Bishop of Petnelissus and Vicar Apostolic of Western Nigeria in 1917, in St. Brendans Cathedral in his native Kerry, officiating over the Benin/Asaba diocese he lived in Asaba.

Broderick died following an operation in Genoa, in 1933. He is buried in the SMA cemetery in Wilton, Cork.
