= Pednelissus =

Coordinates: 37°12′51″N 30°56′03″E

- Pednelissus (Turkey)
- Area codes: for multiple area codes

Pednelissus or Petnelissus (both forms are used in ancient writings and on the city's coins, the latter form alone appearing in its later coins) (Greek: Πεδνηλισσός) was a city on the border between Pamphylia and Pisidia in Asia Minor.

== Location ==
Writing in about AD 530, Hierocles placed it in the later Roman province of Pamphylia Secunda, a reckoning accepted also in the Catholic Church's list of titular sees, which thus makes Perge its metropolitan see. Earlier, Strabo (64/63 BC – c. AD 24) placed it in Pisidia and said that it was north of Aspendus. It was near the Eurymedon River, on the southwestern slope of Mount Taurus, overlooking the Pamphylian plain.

The site of the city does not appear to have been identified with certainty; but it is generally believed to be a site near the village of Kozan, Gebiz, Antalya. The ruins of this site are considerable, covering a wide area. Among the better preserved structures are the agora and a gate-tower. Meagre remains of a Byzantine church can also be found.

== History ==
Polybius gives a detailed account of a war waged against Pednelissus by the neighbouring city of Selge. Pendnelissus called in the Seleucid ruler Achaeus, who forced Selge to yield under onerous terms. In 102 BC, Pednelissus became subject to Rome. In 50 BC Cicero was governor of Cilicia and Pisidia and makes mention of Pednelissus.

From the time of Trajan (98-117 AD) to the late 3rd century, Pednelissus minted bronze coins, which seem not to have had a wide circulation.
