= Eurymedon Bridge (Selge) =

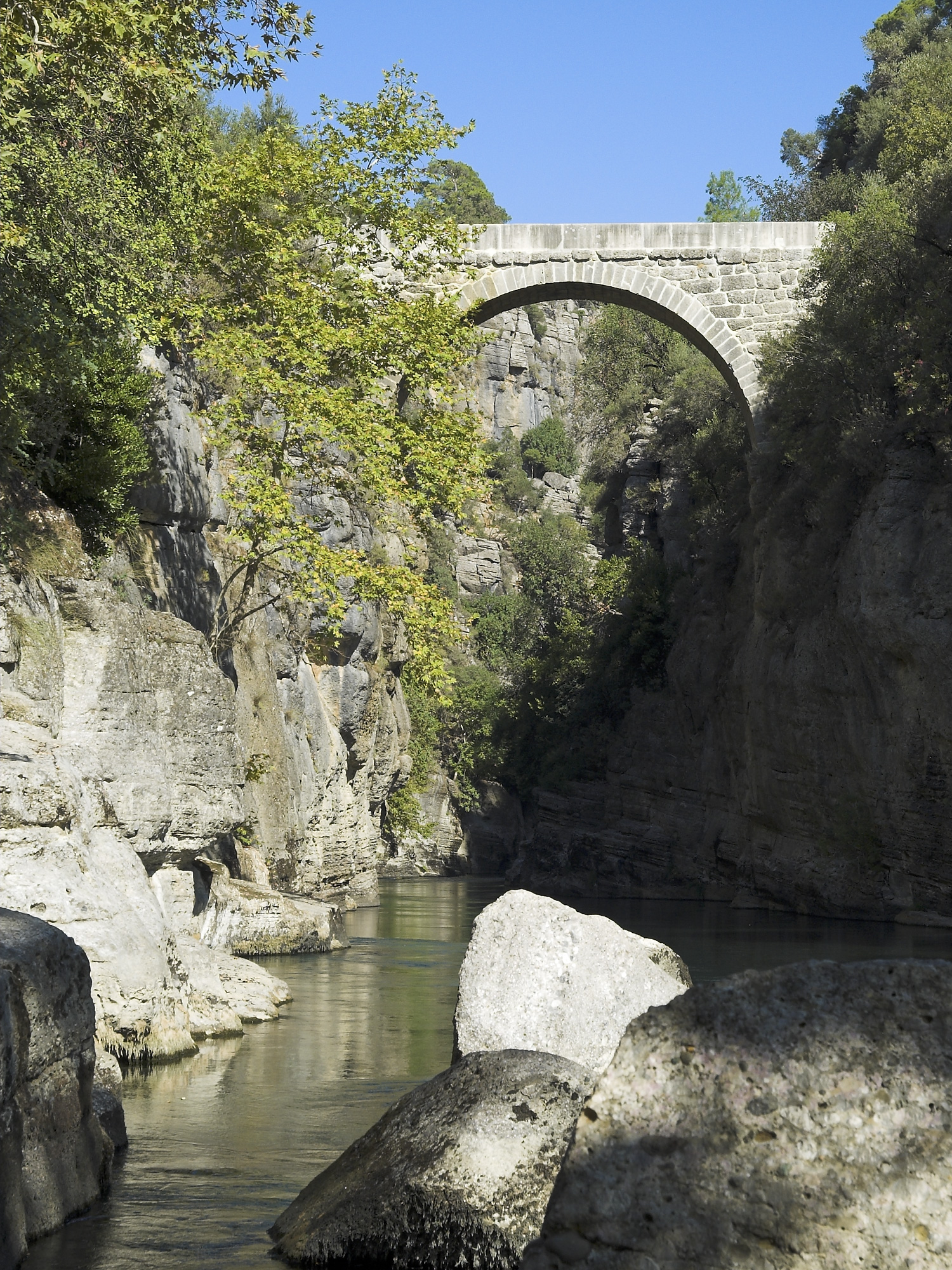
- The Roman bridge over the Eurymedon valley
- Coordinates: 37.191973°N 31.181033°E
- Crosses: Eurymedon (Köprüçay)
- Locale: Near Selge, Pisidia, Turkey
- Official name: Oluk Köprü

Characteristics
- Design: Arch bridge
- Material: Stone
- Total length: 14 m
- Width: 3.5 m
- Longest span: 7 m

History
- Construction end: 2nd century AD

The Eurymedon Bridge (Turkish: Oluk Köprü) is a Roman bridge over the river Eurymedon (modern Köprüçay River) near Selge in Pisidia in southern Turkey. It is part of the road winding up from the coastal region Pamphylia to the Pisidian hinterland. Located 5 km north of the village Beşkonak in a sparsely settled area, the bridge crosses the Eurymedon high above the valley bottom.

The excellently preserved structure is 14 m long and 3.5 m wide (with a roadway of 2.5 m). The clear span of its single arch is c. 7 m, the thickness of its voussoirs, which were set without the use of mortar, 60 cm. The building technique and the sturdy stonework point to a construction date in the 2nd century AD, a time when Selge was flourishing.

Forty-two km downstream at Aspendos, the Eurymedon is crossed by another extant old bridge.

== Gallery ==
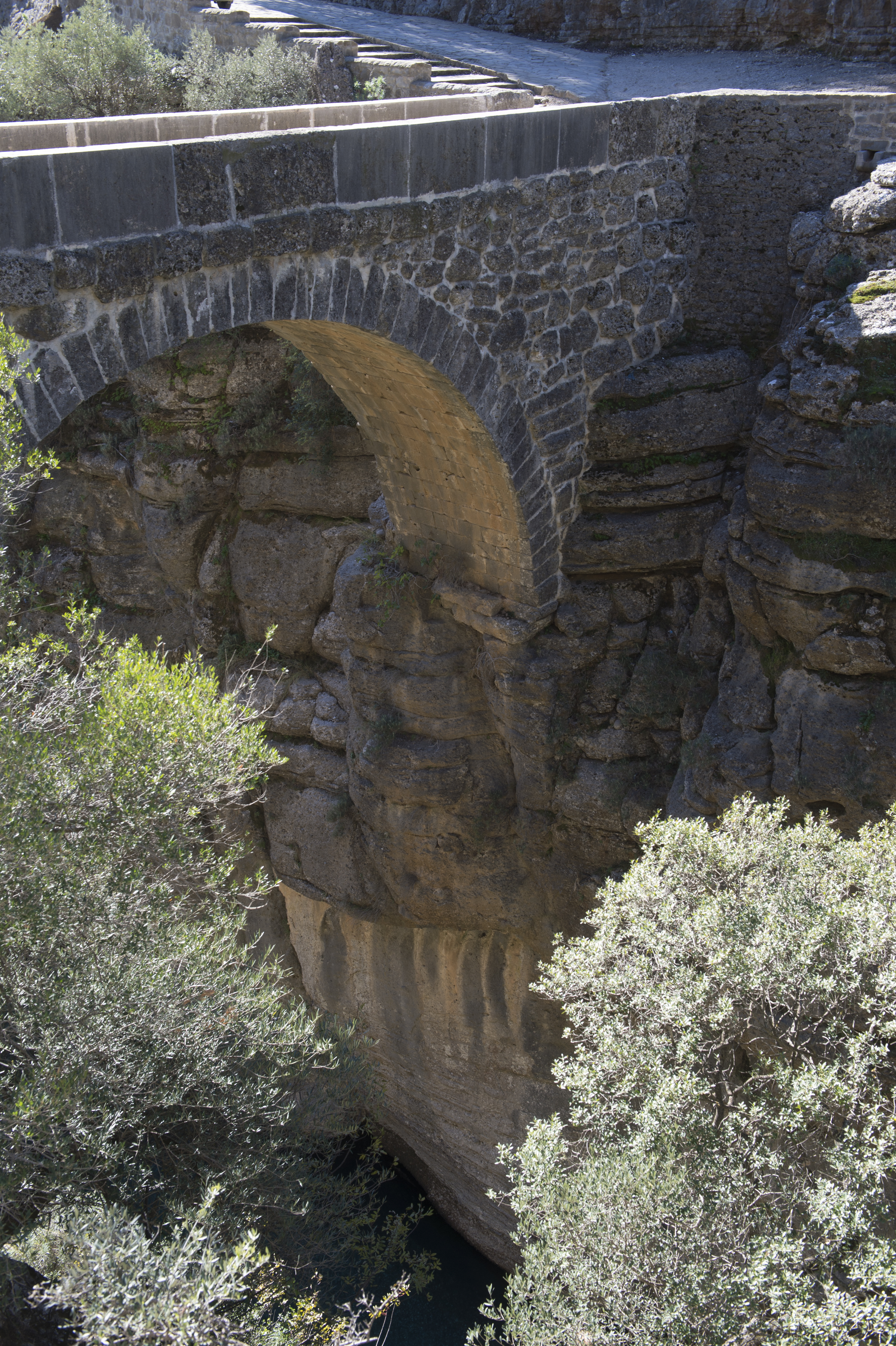

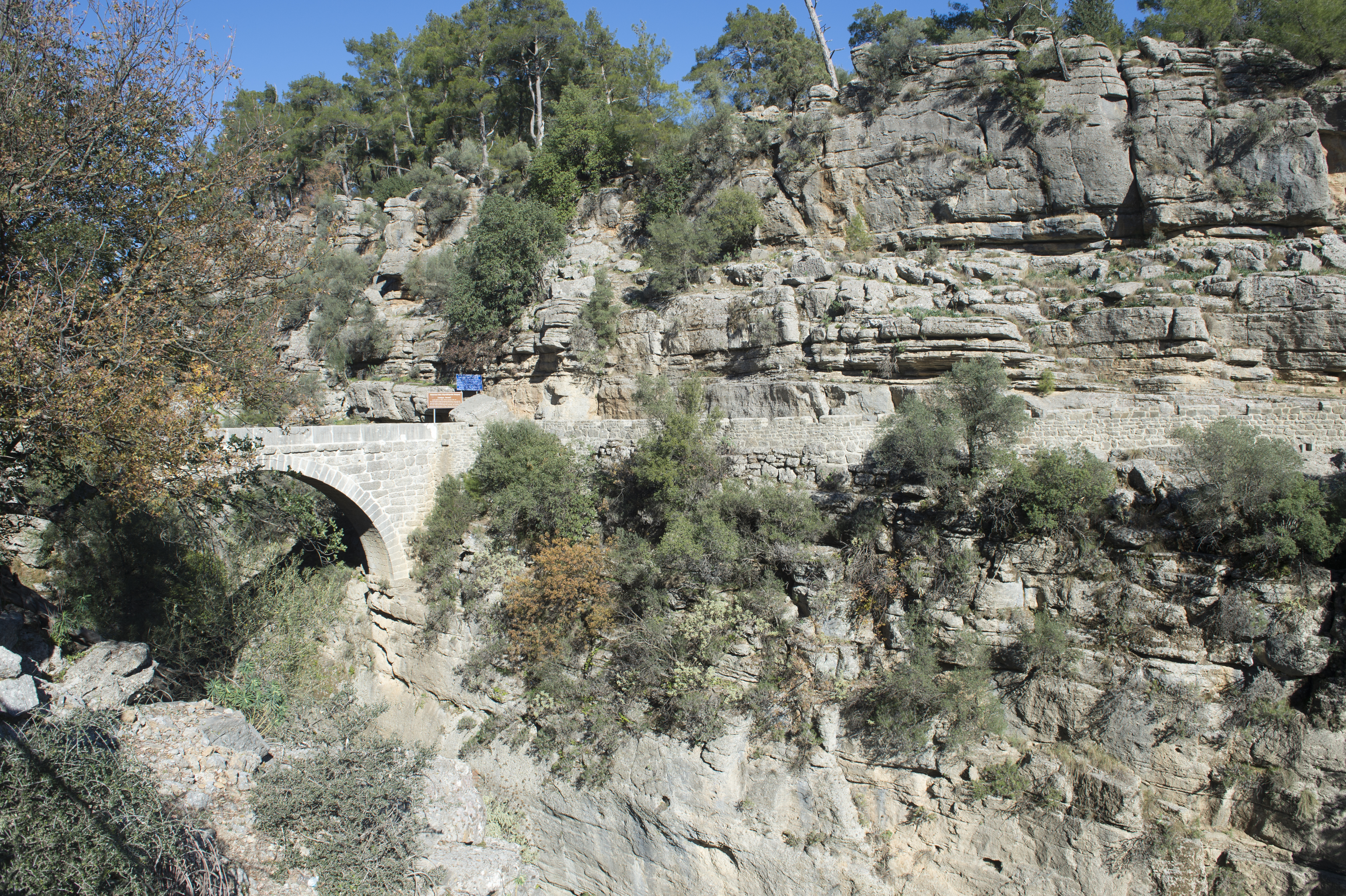

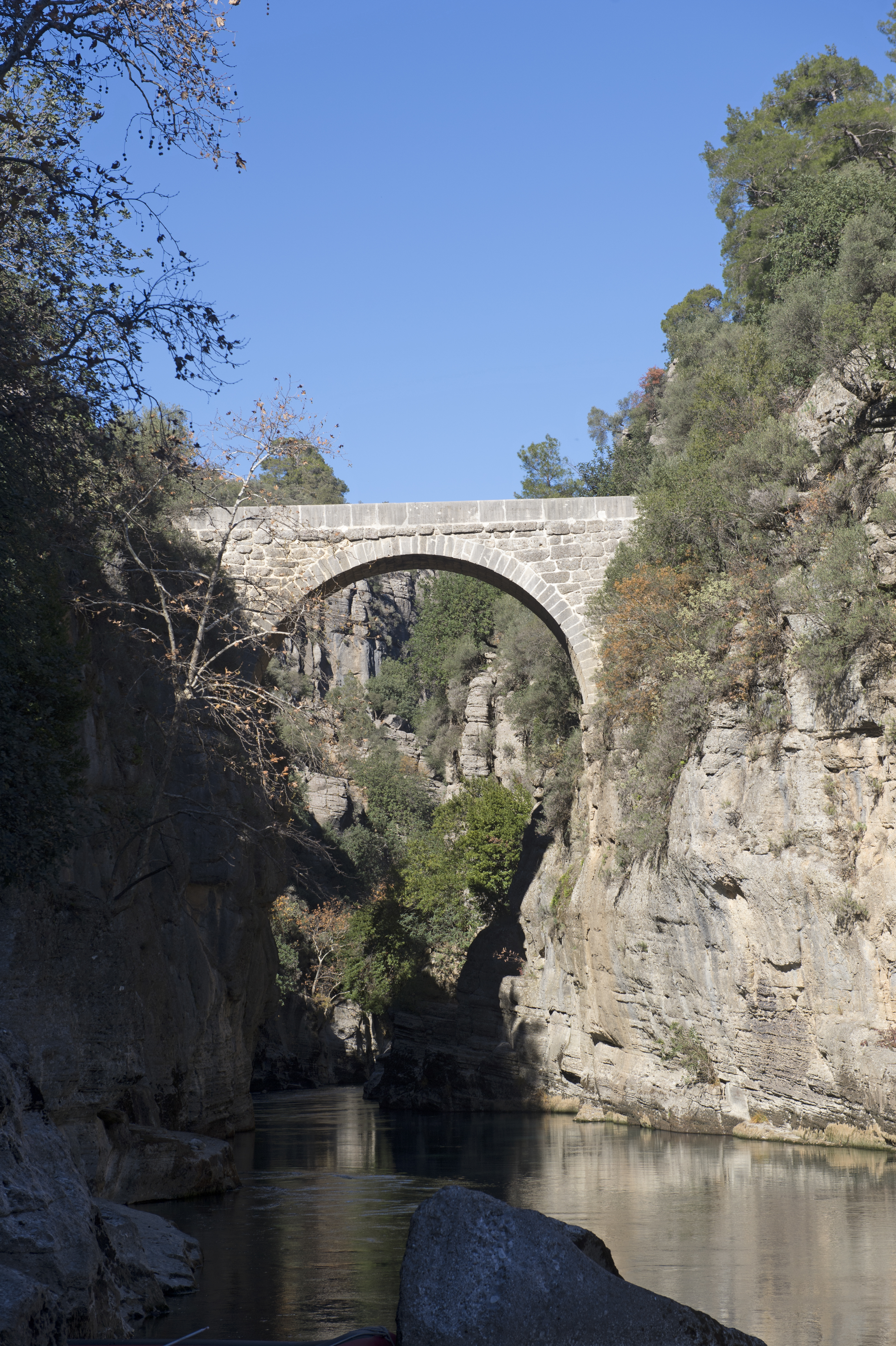

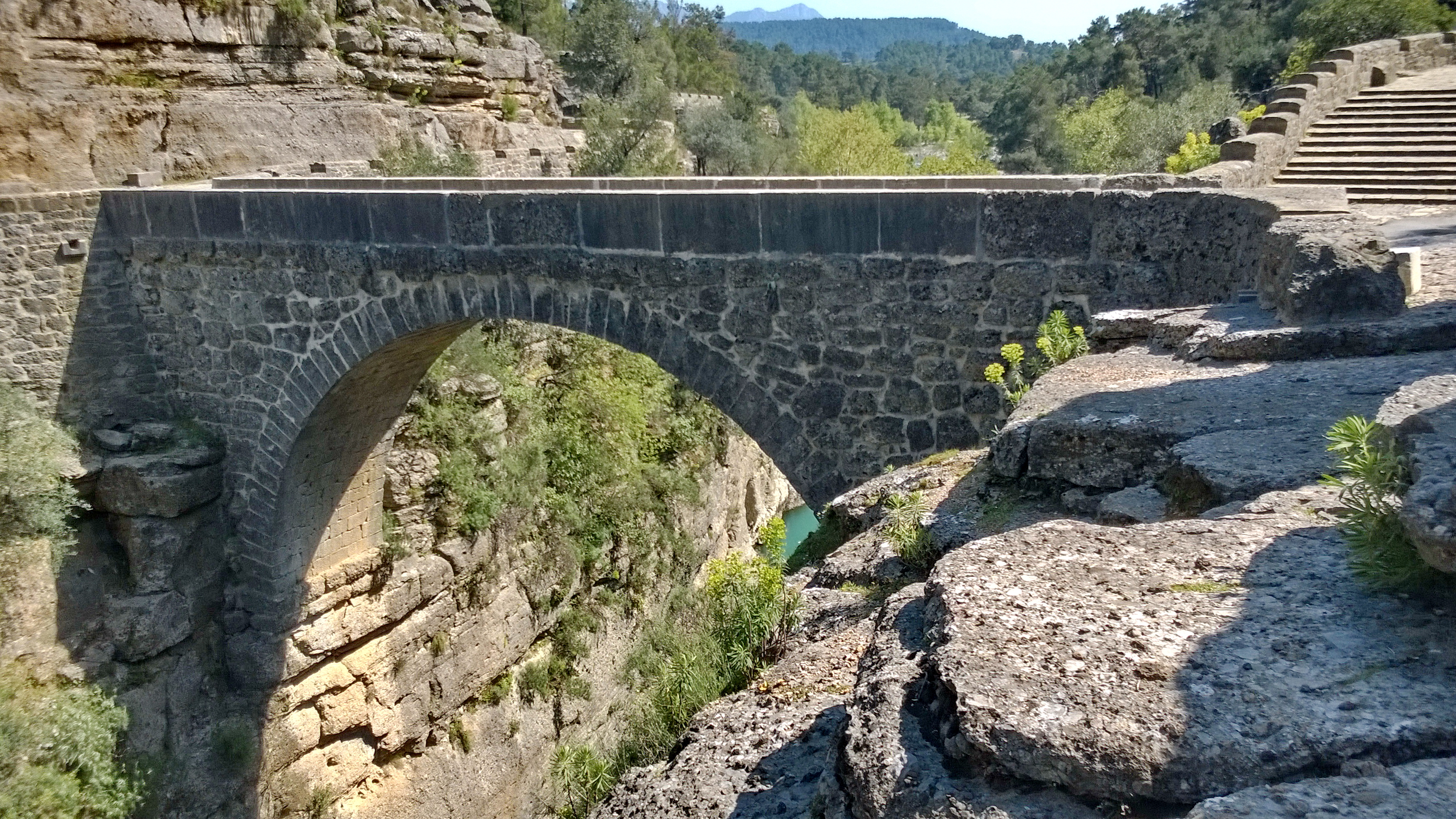

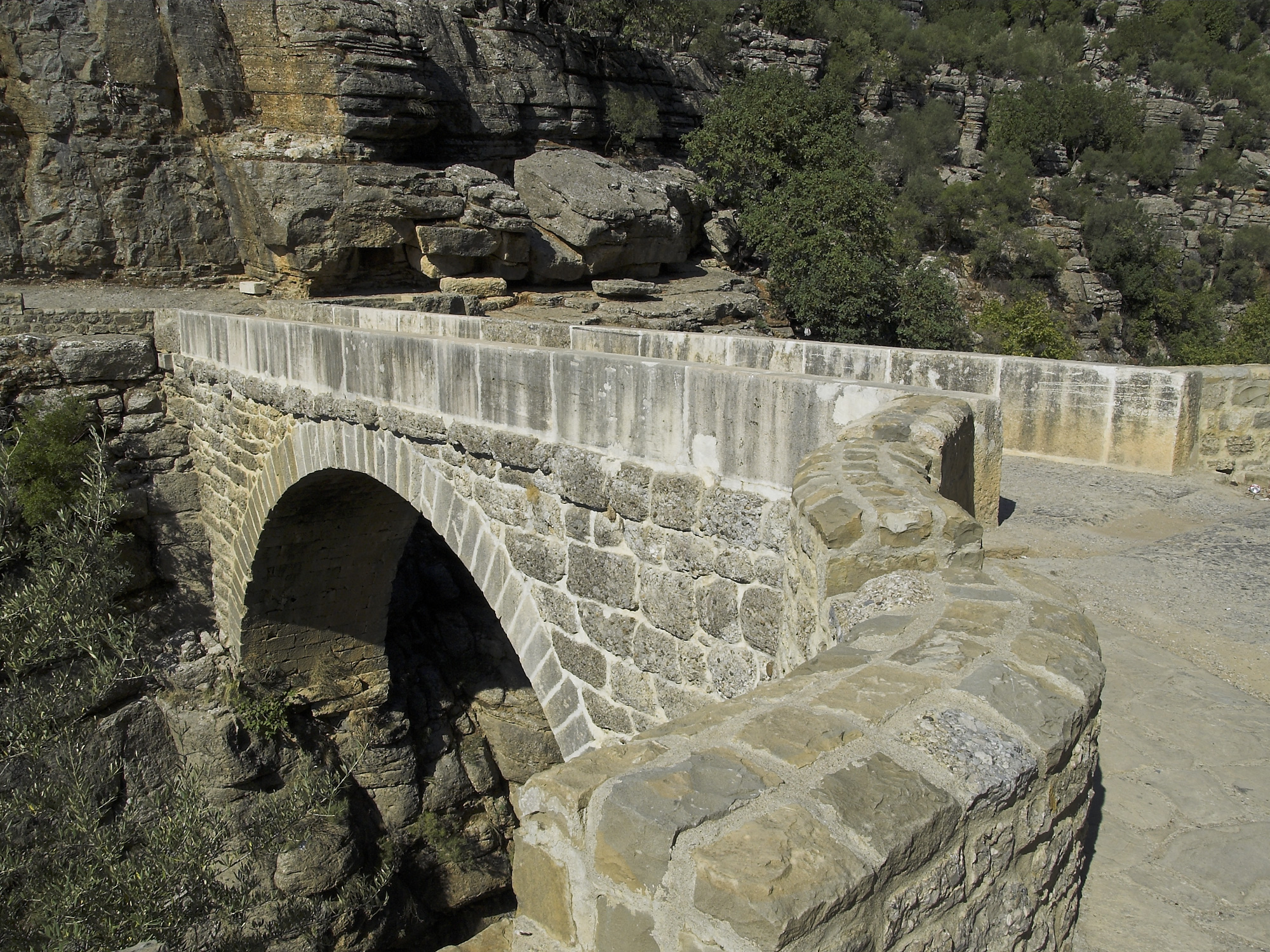

== See also ==
- List of Roman bridges
- Roman architecture
- Roman engineering

== Sources ==
- Bean, George E. (1968), Turkey's Southern Shore. An Archaeological Guide, London, p. 139
- Galliazzo, Vittorio (1994), I ponti romani. Catalogo generale, vol. 2, Treviso: Edizioni Canova, pp. 409–410 (No. 856), ISBN 88-85066-66-6
- O’Connor, Colin (1993), Roman Bridges, Cambridge University Press, p. 126 (E25), ISBN 0-521-39326-4
