= Selge =

Human settlement

- Σέλγη (Greek)
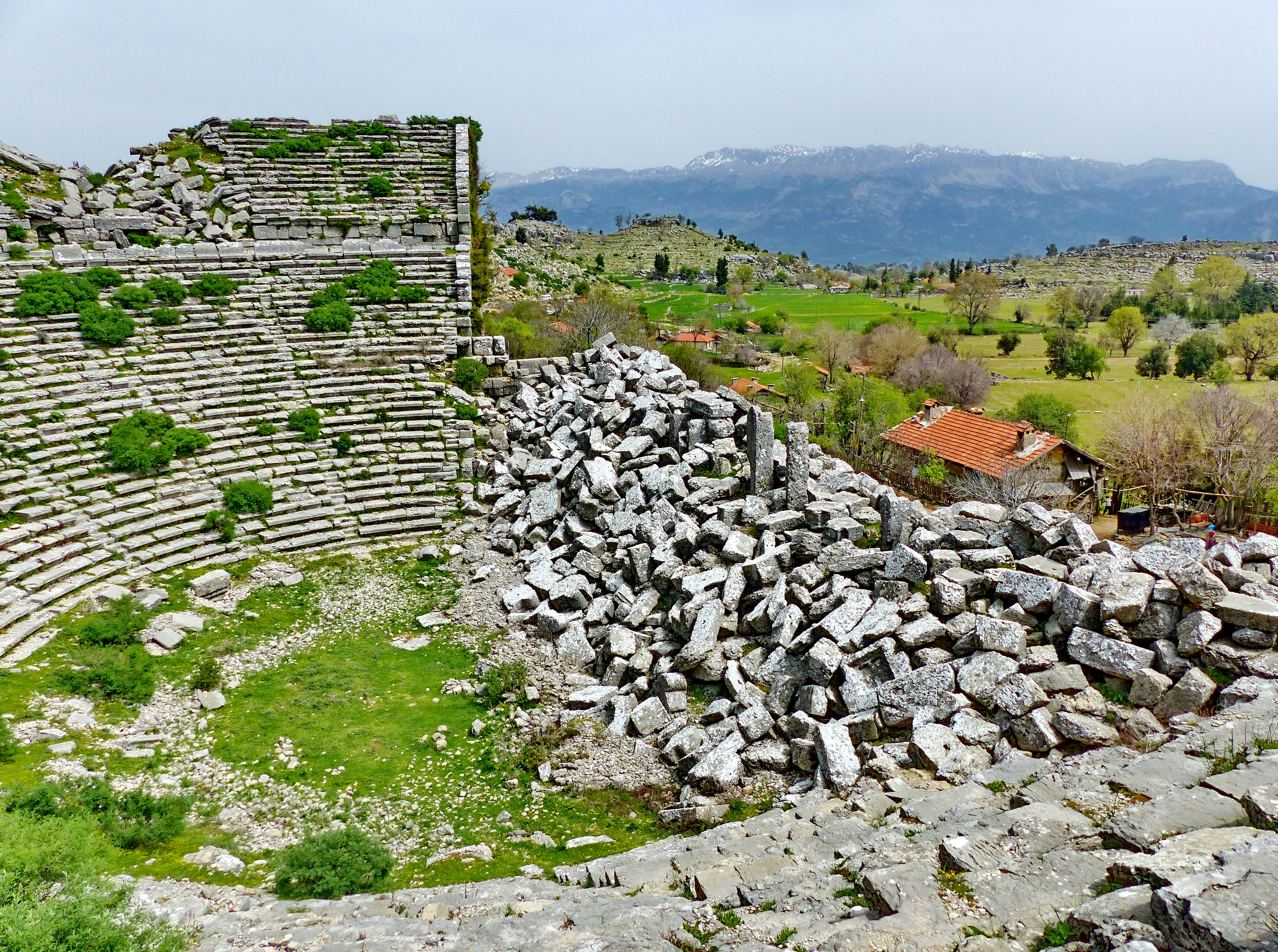
- Roman theatre of Selge

- Location within Turkey
- 37°13′46″N 31°07′38″E
- Type: Settlement
- Cultures: Greek, Roman
- Location: Antalya Province, Turkey
- Region: Pisidia

Site notes
- Condition: In ruins

Selge (Greek: Σέλγη) was an important city in ancient Pisidia and later in Pamphylia, on the southern slope of Mount Taurus, modern Antalya Province, Turkey, at the part where the river Eurymedon River (Turkish: Köprüçay) forces its way through the mountains towards the south.

== History ==
The town was believed to be a Greek colony, for Strabo states that it was founded by Spartans, but adds the somewhat unintelligible remark that previously it had been founded by Calchas. Stephanus of Byzantium, in the Ethnica, also wrote that the city was a Lacedaemon colony. The acropolis of Selge bore the name of Kesbedion. The district in which the town was situated was extremely fertile, producing abundance of oil and wine, but the town itself was difficult of access, being surrounded by precipices and beds of torrents flowing towards the Eurymedon and Cestrus (today Aksu), and requiring bridges to make them passable. In consequence of its excellent laws and political constitution, Selge rose to the rank of the most powerful and populous city of Pisidia, and at one time was able to send an army of 20,000 men into the field. Owing to these circumstances, and the valour of its inhabitants, for which they were regarded as worthy kinsmen of the Spartans, the Selgians were never subject to any foreign power, but remained in the enjoyment of their own freedom and independence. When Alexander the Great passed through Pisidia (333 BC), Selge sent an embassy to him and gained his favour and friendship. At that time they were at war with Termessos.

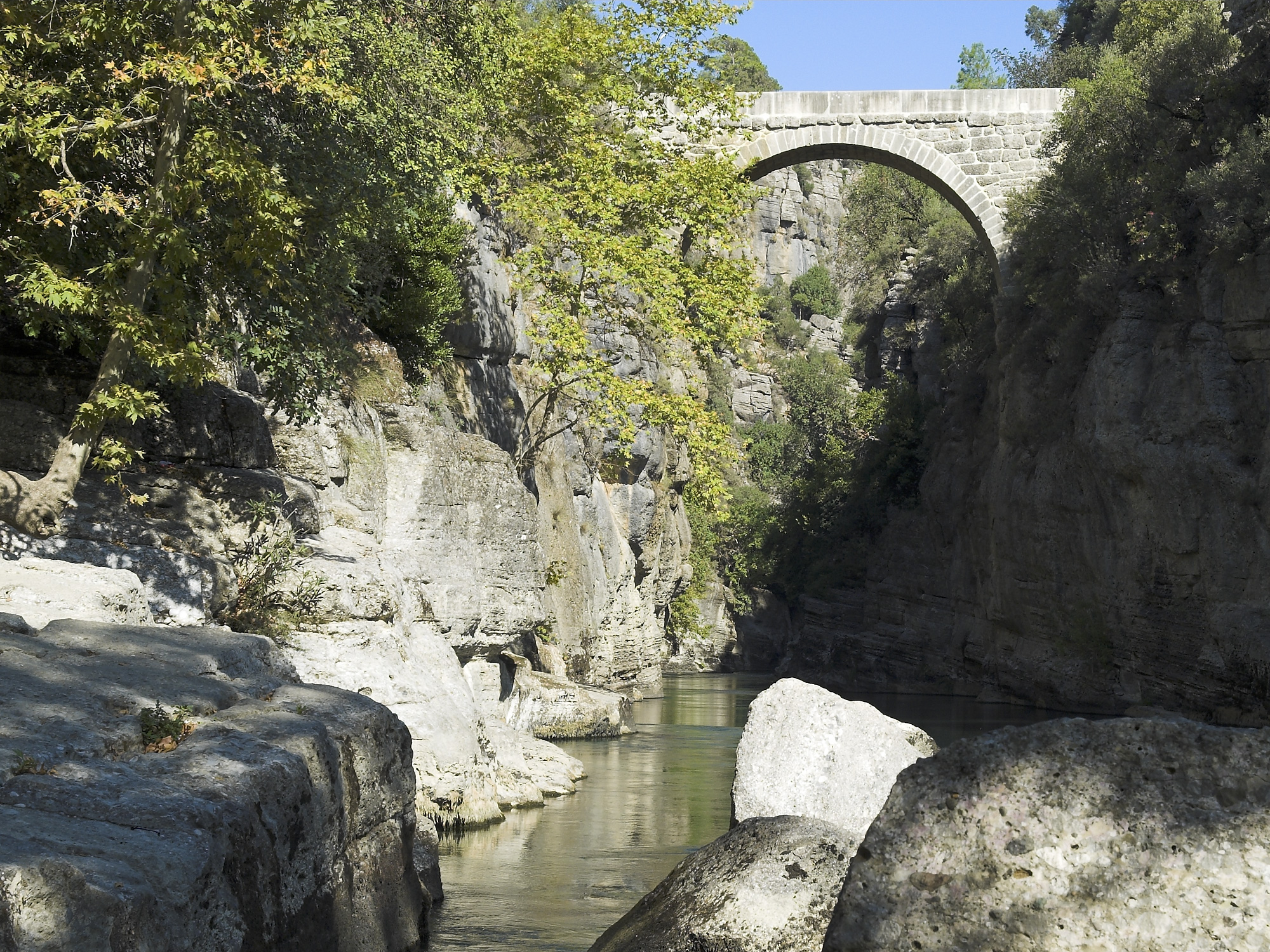
The Roman Eurymedon Bridge near Selge

At the period when Achaeus had made himself master of Western Asia, Selge were at war with Pednelissus, which was besieged by them; and Achaeus, on the invitation of Pednelissus, sent a large force against Selge (218 BC). After a long and vigorous siege, the Selgians, being betrayed and despairing of resisting Achaeus any longer, sent deputies to sue for peace, which was granted to them on the following terms: they agreed to pay immediately 400 talents, to restore the prisoners of Pednelissus, and after a time to pay 300 talents in addition. In the 5th century AD Zosimus calls it indeed a little town, but it was still strong enough to repel a body of Goths. It is strange that Pliny does not notice Selge, for it is known from its coins that it was still a flourishing town in the time of Hadrian; and it is also mentioned in Ptolemy and Hierocles. Independently of wine and oil, the country about Selge was rich in timber, and a variety of trees, among which the storax was much valued from its yielding a strong perfume. Selge was also celebrated for an ointment prepared from the iris root.

== Remains ==
The remains of the city consist mainly of parts of the encircling wall and of the acropolis. A few traces have survived of the gymnasium, the stoa, the stadium and the basilica. There are also the outlines of two temples, but the best conserved monument is the theater, restored in the 3rd century AD. Selge was the seat of a bishop; it remains a titular see of the Roman Catholic Church.

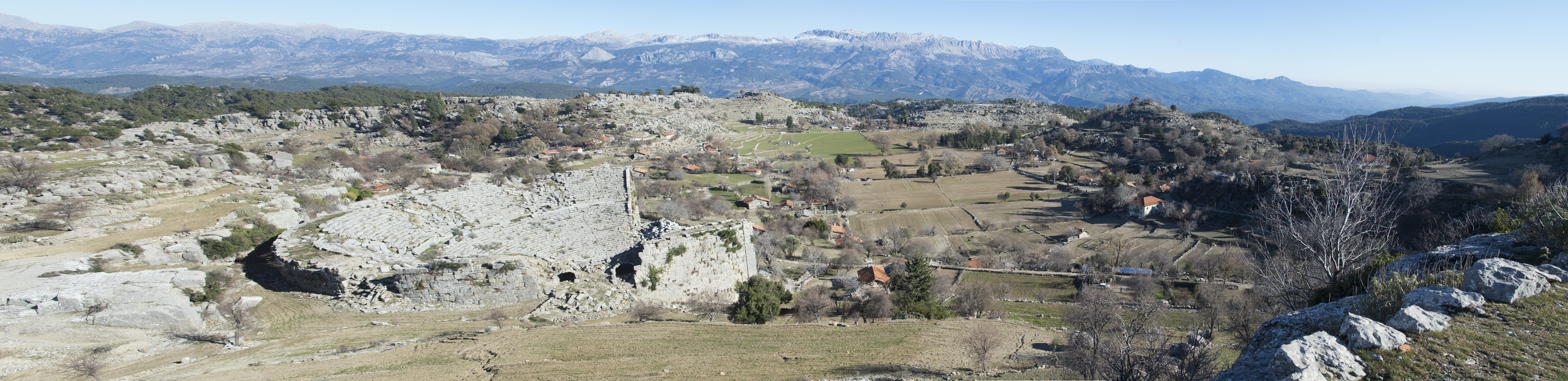
Selge Theatre and surroundings panorama

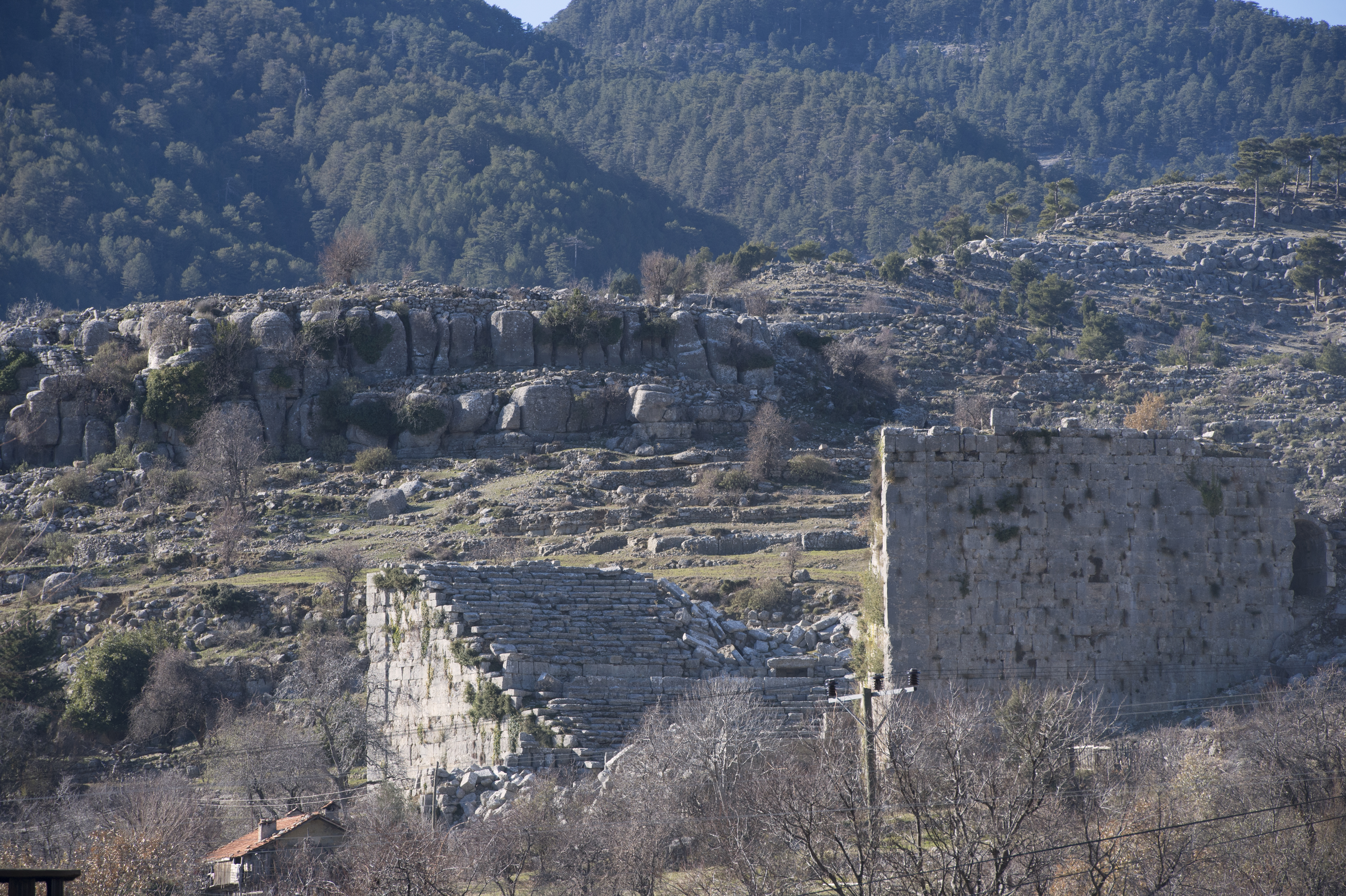
Selge Theatre from far

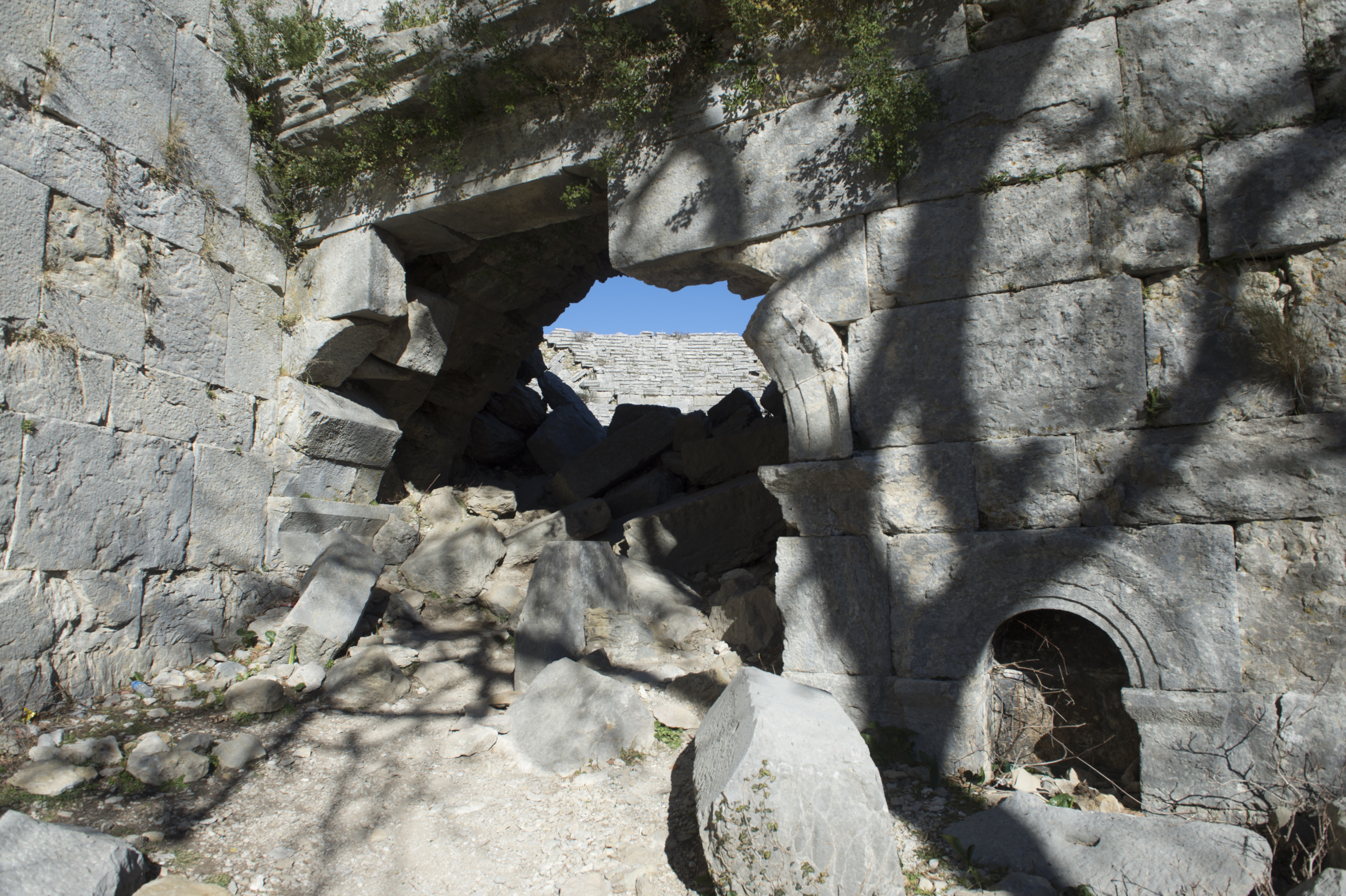
Selge Theatre from side

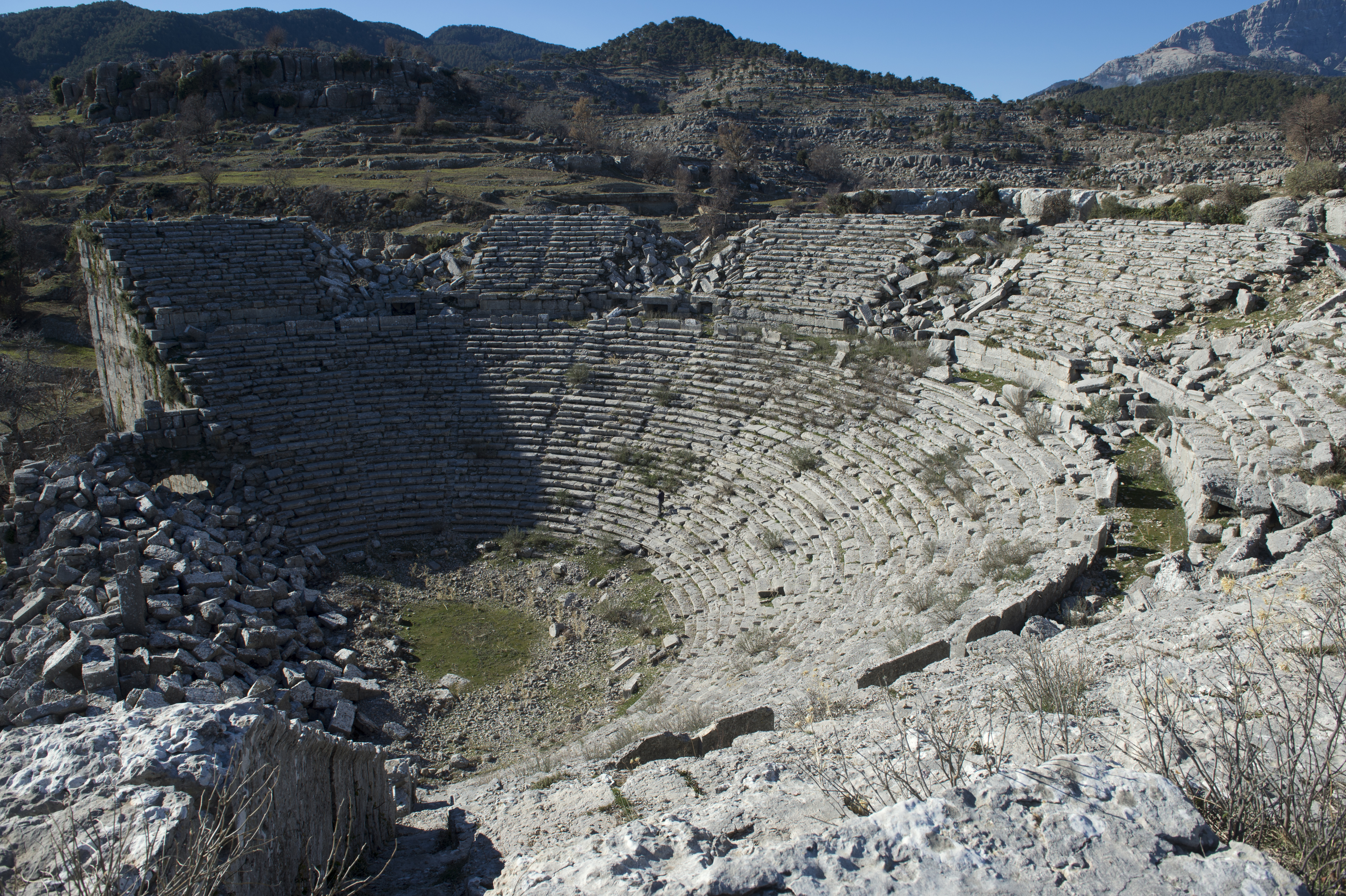
Selge Theatre Inside

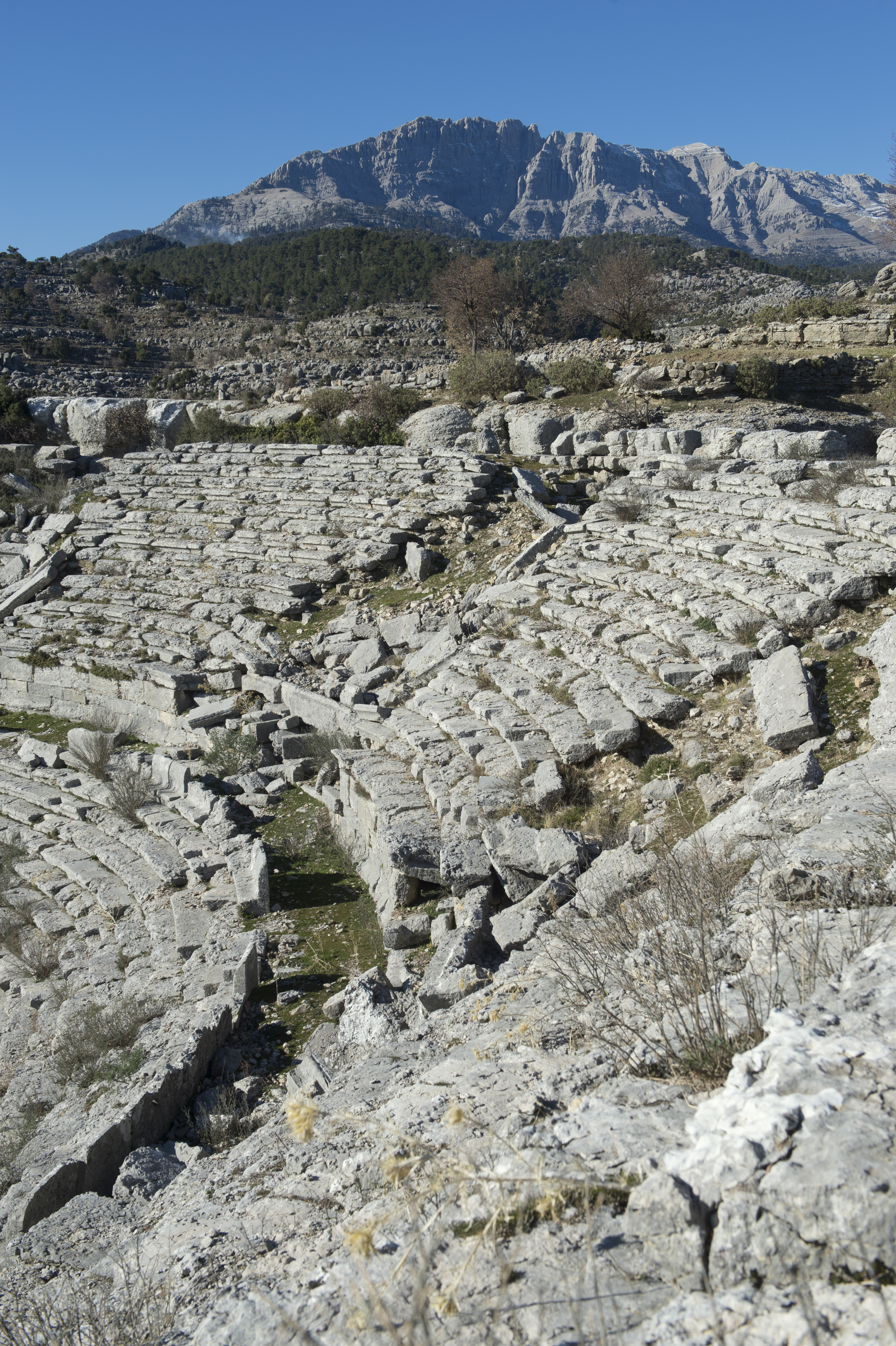
Selge Theatre Inside

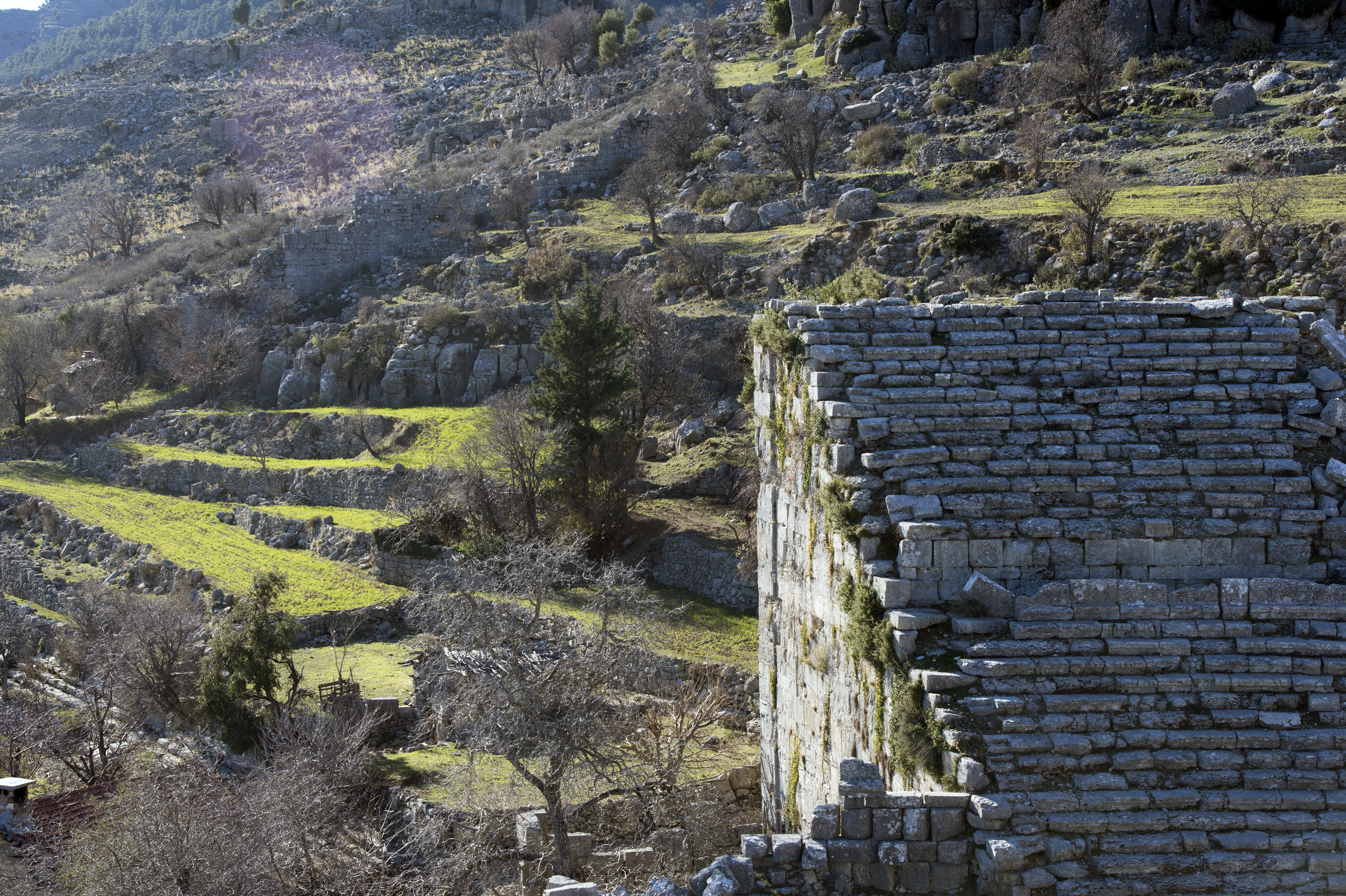
Selge Theatre and countryside

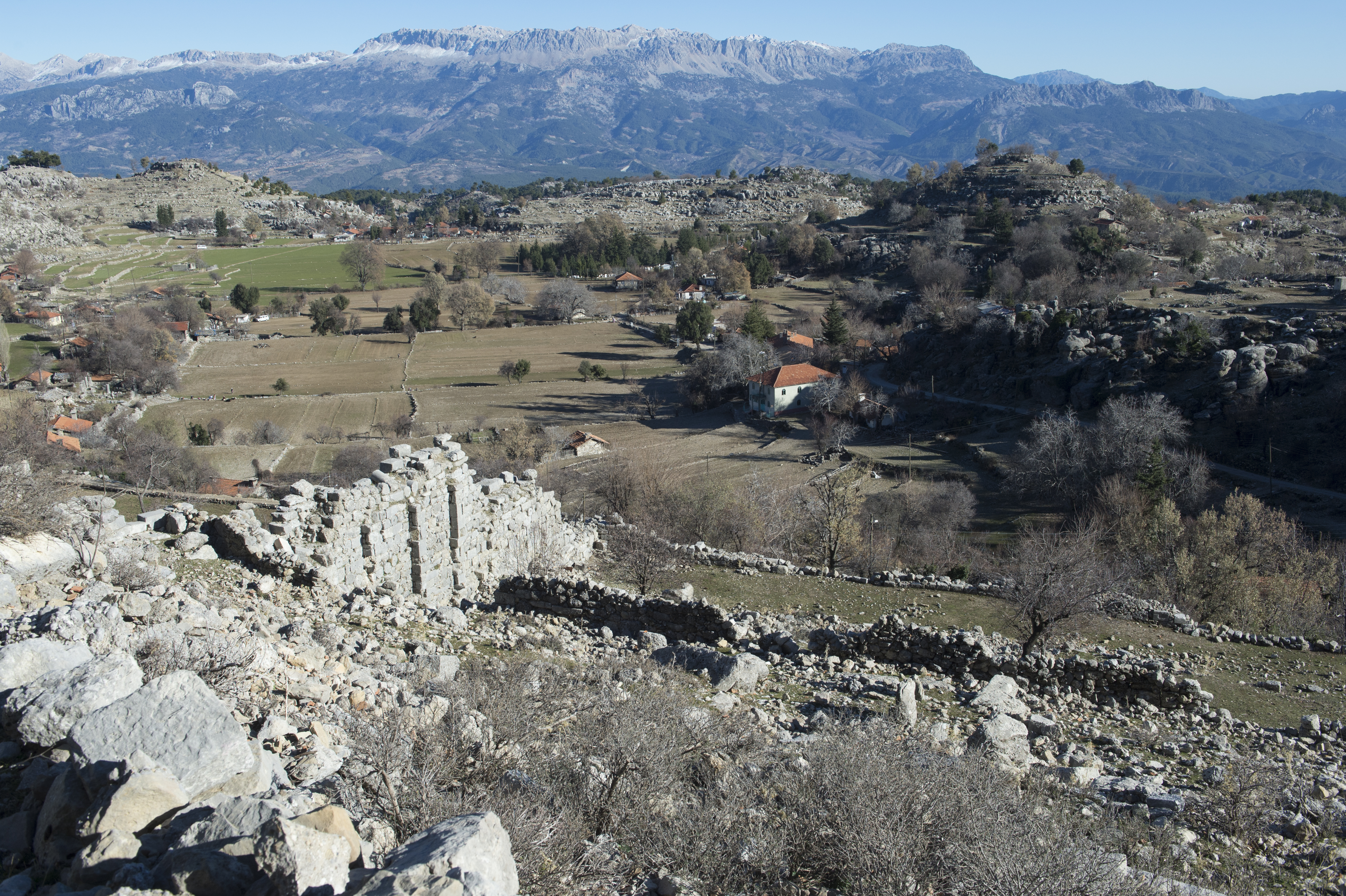
Selge Unknown structure

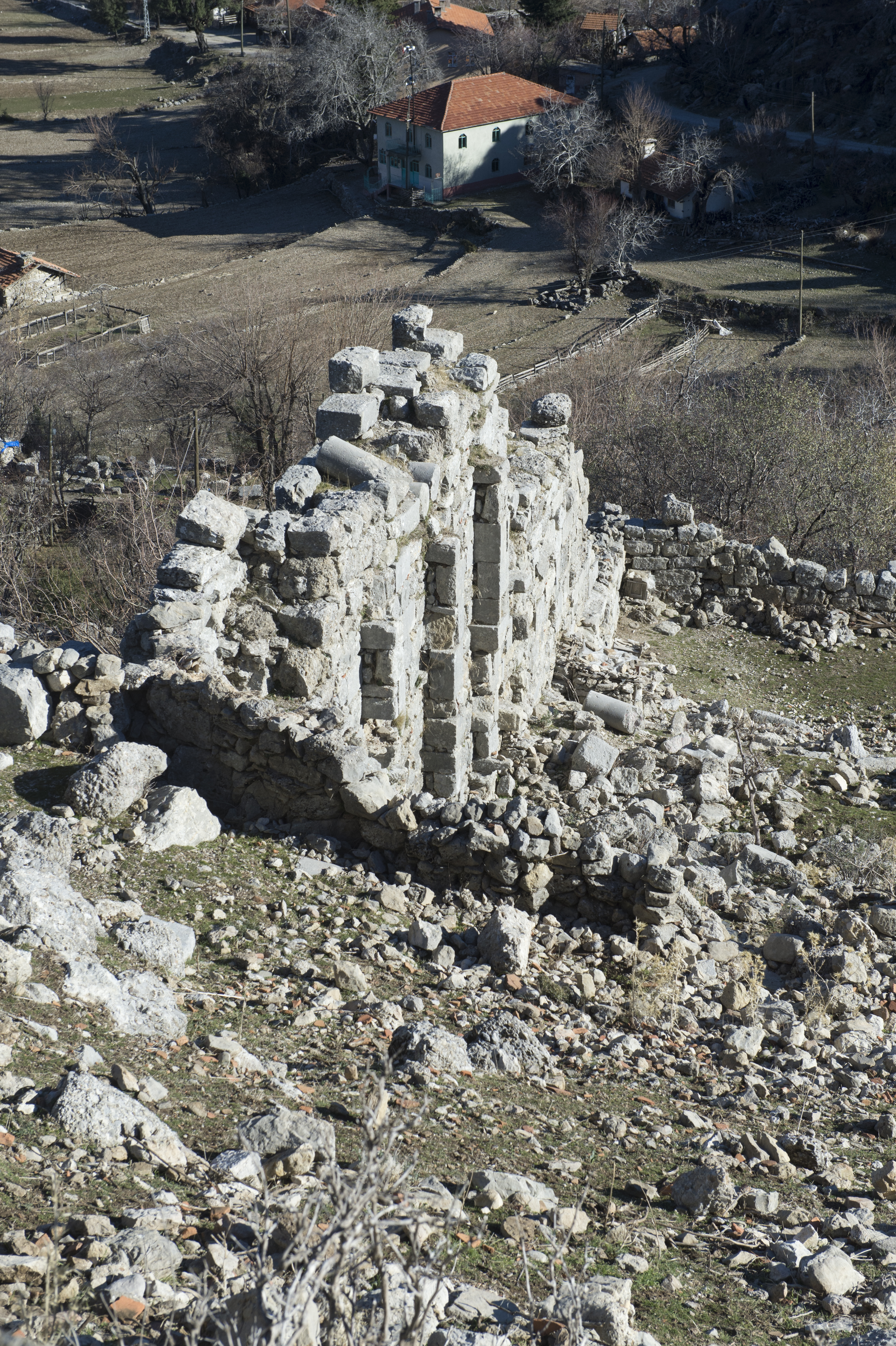
Selge Unknown structure

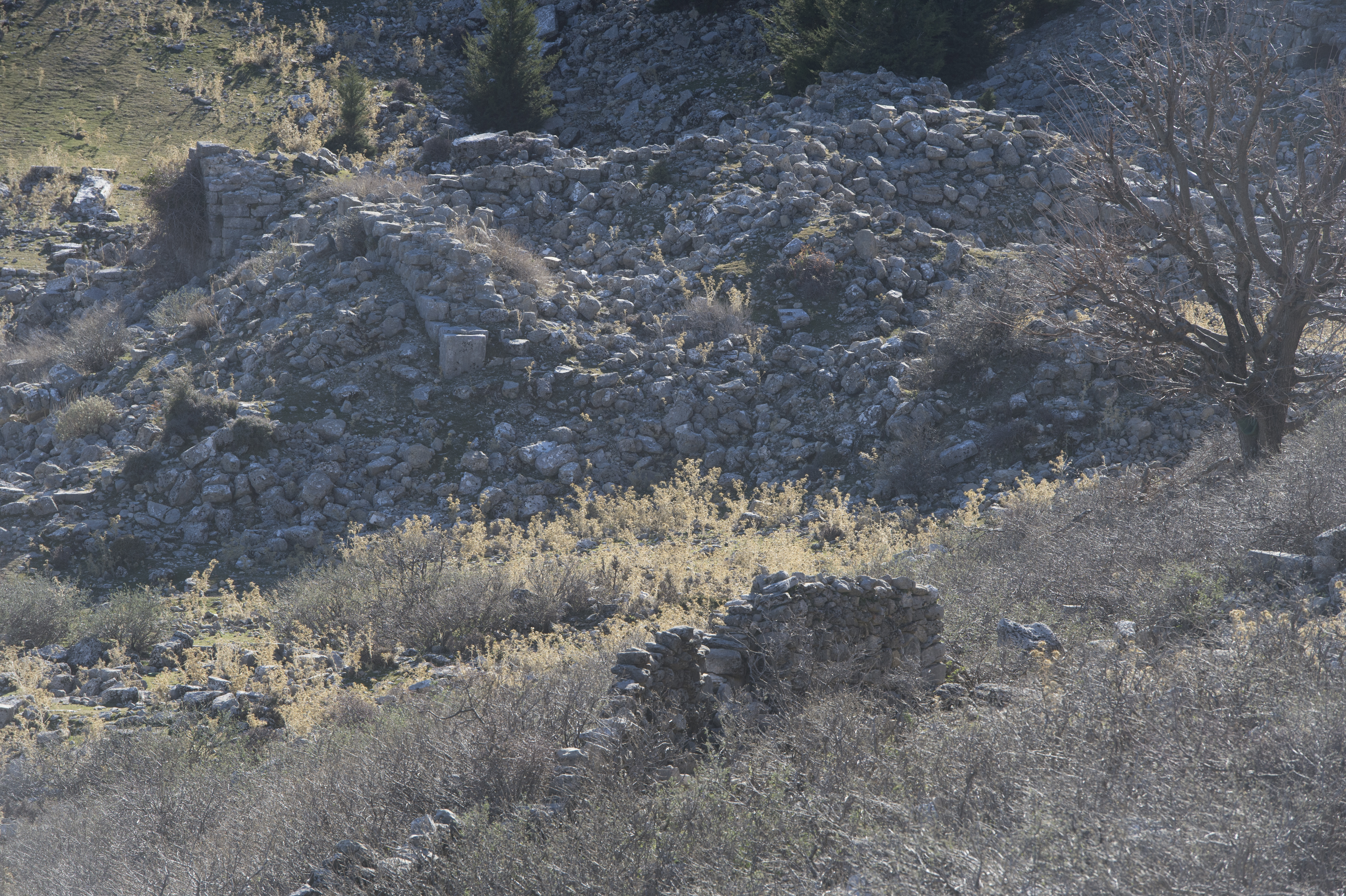
Selge Rubble

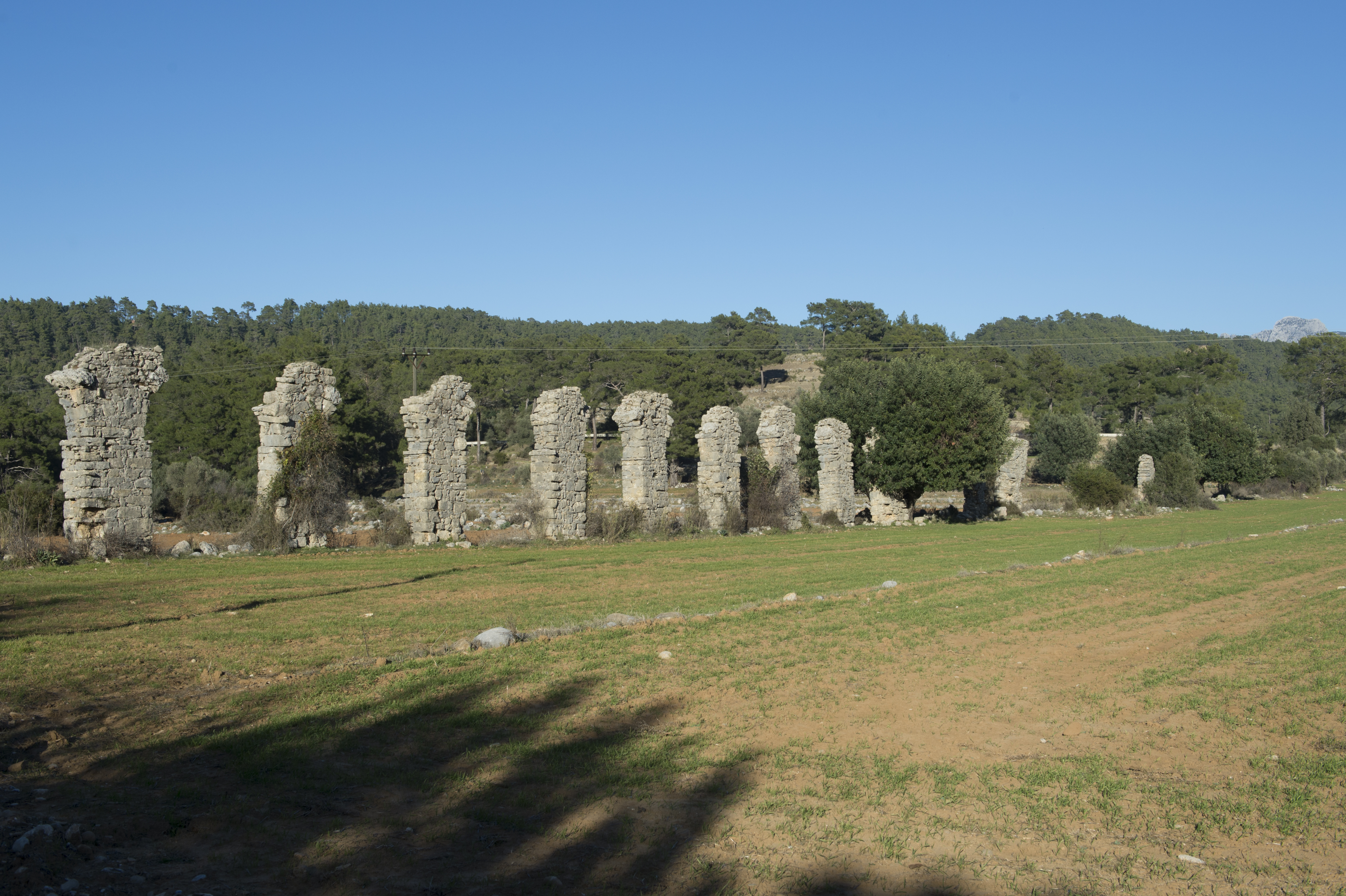
Selge Aqueduct

== Nearby ==
Halfway on the road to Selge from the Pamphylian coastal plain, a well-preserved Roman Bridge crosses the deep Eurymedon valley.

== Bishopric ==
Selge was a see of an ancient bishopric of the Roman province of Pamphylia Prima in the civil diocese of Asia which today survives only as a suppressed seat of the Patriarchate of Constantinople and a titular see of the Catholic Church.

The Bishopric is documented in the Notitiae Episcopatuum of the Patriarchate of Constantinople until the fourteenth century. Its lapse is probably due to the Islamic conquest of Turkey.

Since the nineteenth century Selge has been counted among the titular archbishopric headquarters of the Catholic Church; the title has not been assigned since September 13, 1969.

=== Byzantine-era residential bishops ===
- Uranion (mentioned in 325)
- Nunechius (mentioned in 431)
- Marcianus (mentioned in 869) who intervened in the Council of Constantinople of 869-870
- Gregory (mentioned in 879)
- Basil (around 10th century)
- Theodore (around 11th century)

=== Titular Catholic Archbishops ===
- Antoine-Marie-Joseph Usse, (1893 - 1905)
- Eduardo Solar Vicuña (1914 - 1920)
- Raymond-René Lerouge, (1920-1949)
- João Batista Portocarrero Costa (1953-1959)
- Bernard James Sheil (1959-1969)

== See also ==
- Perga
