= Eurymedon the Hierophant =

Eleusinian hierophant

Eurymedon the Hierophant (/jʊəˈrɪmɪdɒn/; Greek: Εὐρυμέδων ὁ ἱεροφάντης) was a representative of the priestly clan overseeing the Eleusinian Mysteries. Together with Demophilus he reportedly brought a charge of impiety against Aristotle after Alexander the Great's death in 323 BC.
