= Eurymedon of Myrrhinus =

Husband of Plato's sister, Potone

Eurymedon /jʊəˈrɪmɪdɒn/ of Myrrhinus /ˈmɪrɪnəs/ (Greek: Εὐρυμέδων Μυρρινούσιος) married Plato's sister, Potone. He was the father of Speusippus and was potentially the grandson of the elder Eurymedon. His property was adjacent to that of Plato, and he is referred to as the executor of Plato's will. Eurymedon is speculated to have been the grandson of an elder Eurymedon. Additionally, there is a possibility that he was the son of Speusippus.
