= Eurymedon Bridge (Aspendos) =

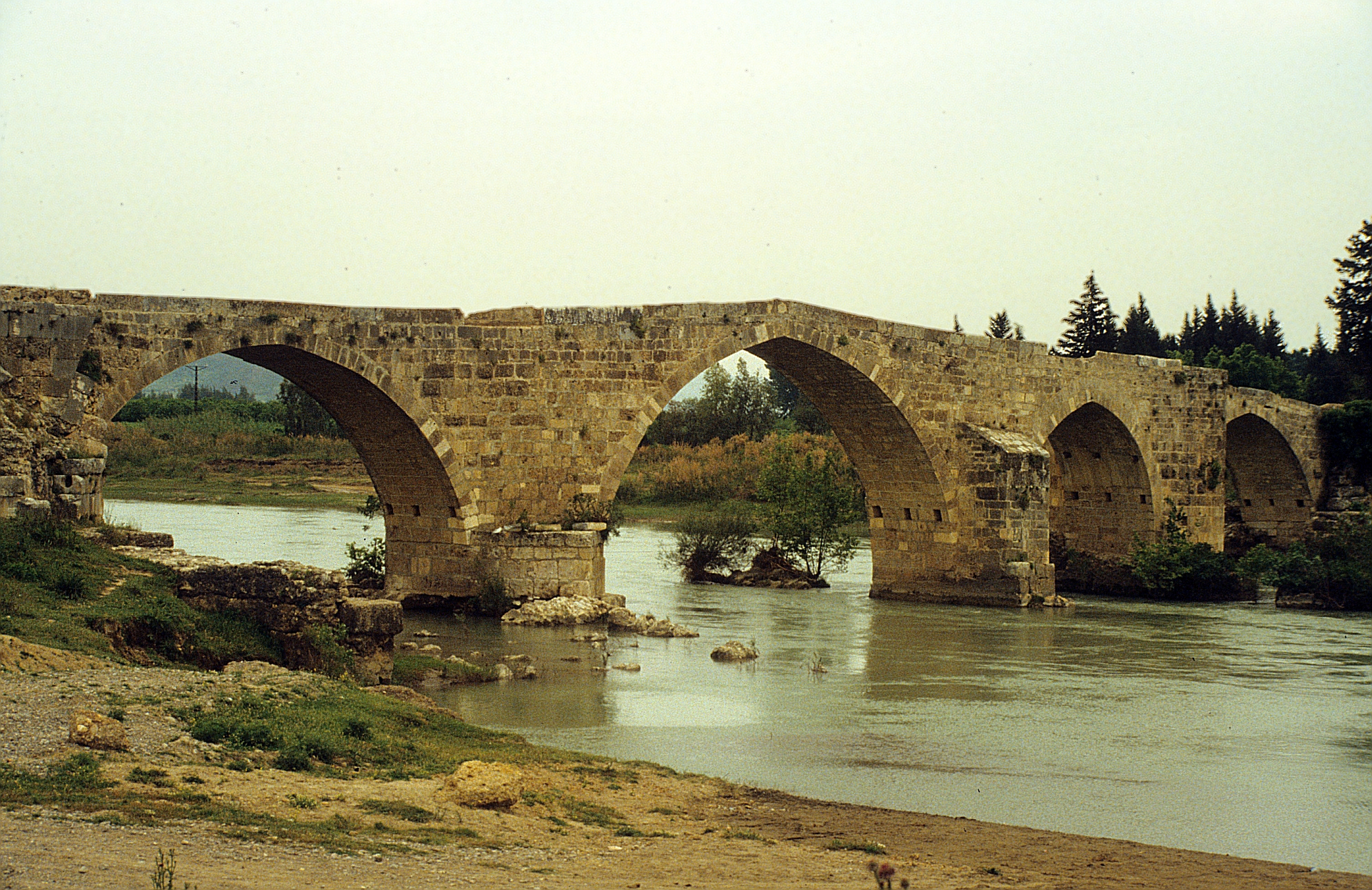
- The Seljuq-era bridge, seen from the southwest
- Coordinates: 36.914232°N 31.162999°E
- Crosses: Eurymedon (Köprüçay)
- Locale: Aspendos, Pamphylia, Anatolia
- Official name: Köprüpazar Köprüsü

Characteristics
- Design: Arch bridge
- Material: Stone, Roman concrete
- Total length: 259.50 m (Roman bridge)
- Width: 9.44 m (Roman bridge)
- Longest span: 23.52 m (Roman bridge)
- No. of spans: 9 (Roman bridge)

History
- Opened: 4th century (Roman bridge); 13th century (Seljuq bridge)

Location
- Interactive map of Eurymedon Bridge (Aspendos)

The Eurymedon Bridge was a late Roman bridge over the river Eurymedon (modern Köprüçay), near Aspendos, in Pamphylia in southern Anatolia. The foundations and other stone blocks (spolia) of the Roman structure were used by the Seljuqs to build a replacement bridge in the 13th century, the Köprüpazar Köprüsü, which stands to this day. This bridge is characterized by a significant displacement along its mid-line, noticeable by looking at its ancient piers.

== Roman bridge ==
=== Structure ===
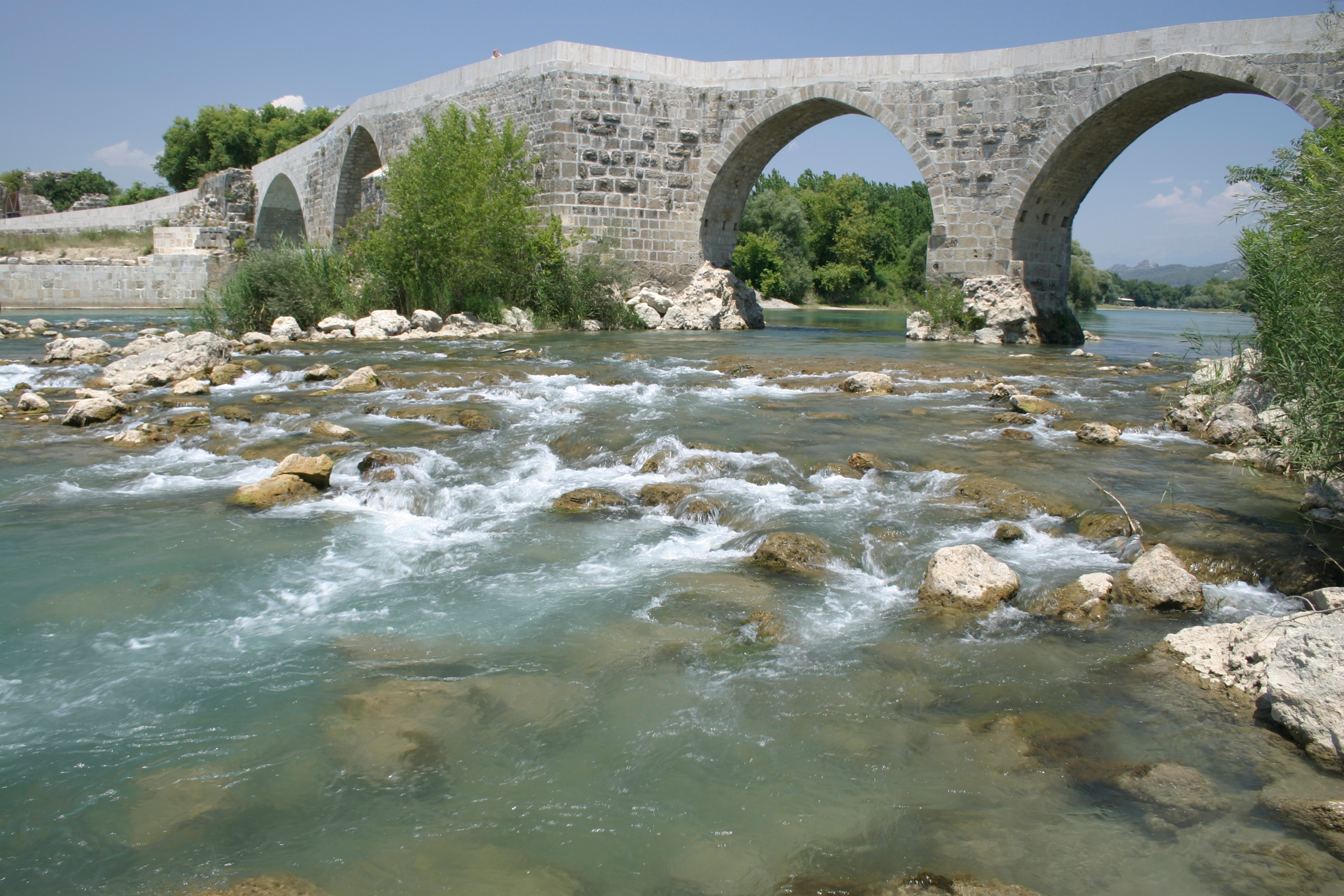
The characteristic mid-course displacement

The original shape and construction of the Roman-era bridge have been reconstructed digitally, based on the extant remains of the ancient structure: the ramps, the abutments, and foundations of the piers. Several pieces of the original bridge are scattered along the river bed on both banks, and were not used during reconstruction.

Originally, the bridge had a length of 259.50 m and a width of 9.44 m, and had nine semicircular arches. It crossed the river at a basic 90-degree angle, although it bent slightly on one end. The two access ramps provide information about the overall height of the structure, and the gradient on each end is similar (12.3% and 12.2%), The midpoint of the bridge was approximately 4.1 m higher than the later Seljuk structure.

This middle section stood on six arches, while both sides had smaller arches (one on the right and two on the left) which served as spillways in case the river overflowed. At its normal level, the river flowed between the three central arches, constrained by double-wedge-shaped reinforcements of masonry, placed at the two outer pillars and intended to prevent their undermining by the river. These masonry structures were – according to the archaeological record – markedly higher on the upstream side (8.15 m) than on the downstream (4.76 m). In addition, wedge-shaped breakwaters were added on the piers, although not all piers feature them on both sides. The clear spans of the three central arches have been determined at 23.52 m for the central arch and 14.95 m for the two flanking arches, while the two piers supporting the central arch were measured at 9.60 m.

The gaps in the right end of the structure reveal the hollow chamber construction method of the bridge deck, typical of several Roman bridges in Asia Minor, e.g. the Aesepus Bridge. The great height of the ancient structure is further verified by the discovery of 1.5 m long iron threaded rods, which, bound together with hooks and loops, were used to reinforce the masonry in the bridge's foundations. The main body of the bridge was built using concrete, which survives in at least one Seljuq-era pier as a foundation.

=== Dates ===
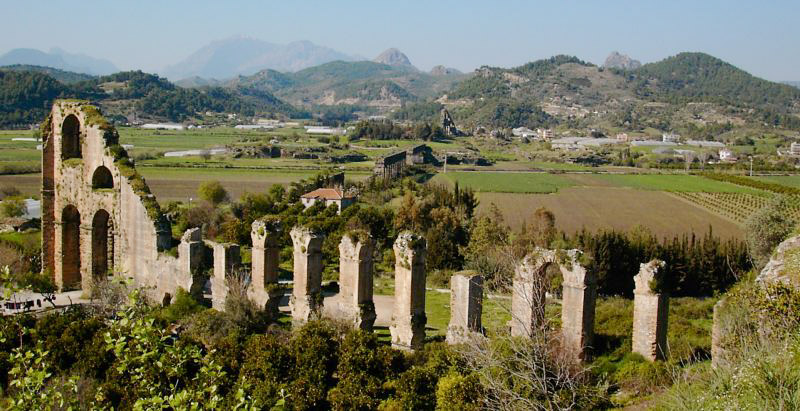
The pressure conduit of the Aspendos aqueduct

The exact date of the bridge's construction is uncertain. The date of construction is closely connected with the Aqueduct of Aspendos, parts of which were re-used in the bridge. In the outer shell of the bridge alone, 250 pipe-shaped stones from the aqueduct's main pressure conduit were re-used. Since the aqueduct has been known to have functioned until into the 4th century AD, that provides a terminus post quem for the construction of the Eurymedon bridge, although it is still possible that an earlier bridge already existed on this location. This bridge could possibly have been destroyed in the large earthquake of May 363, which also ruined the aqueduct, thus explaining the use of the latter's duct stones in the rebuilding of the bridge.

== Seljuq bridge ==
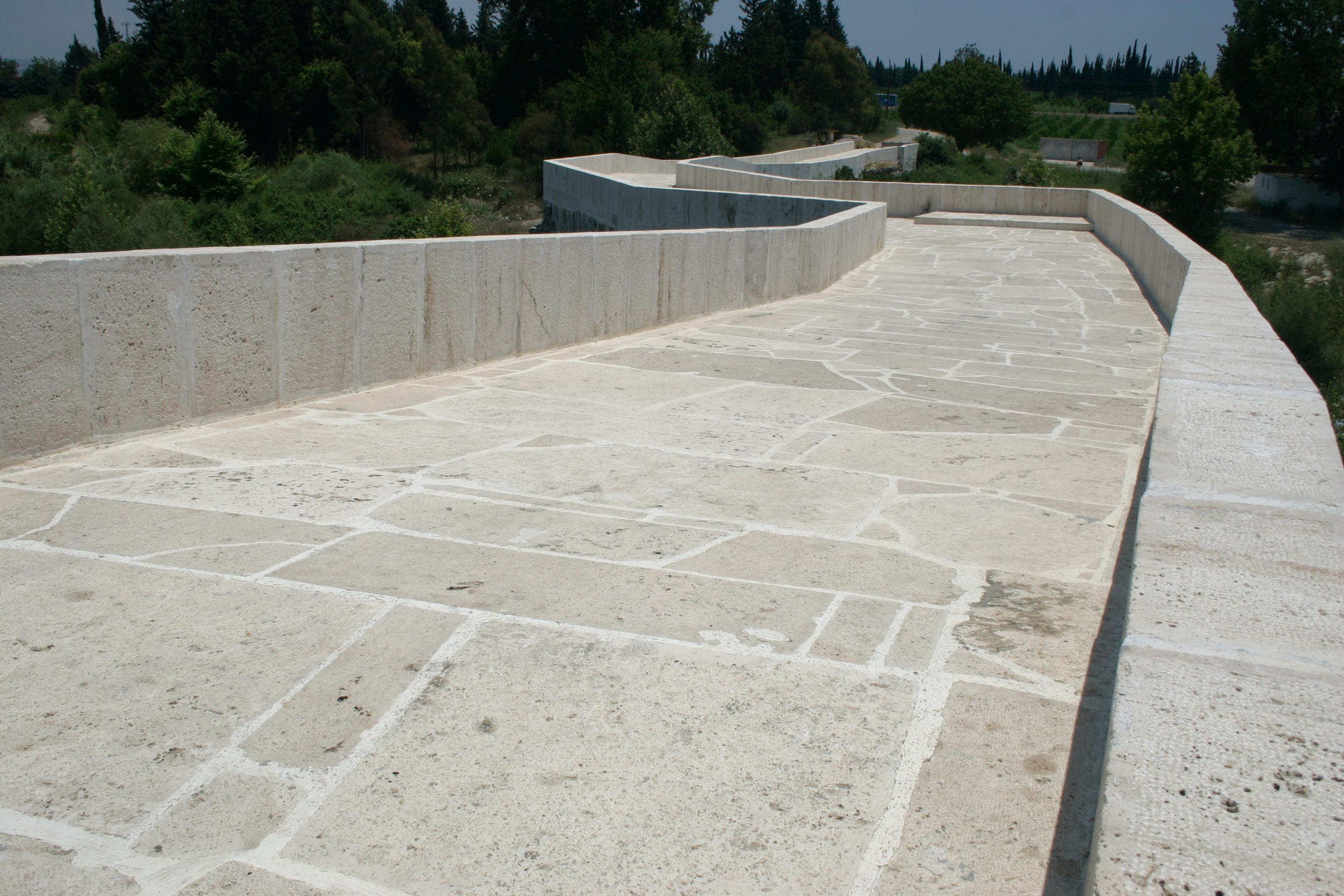
Close-up of the zigzag course

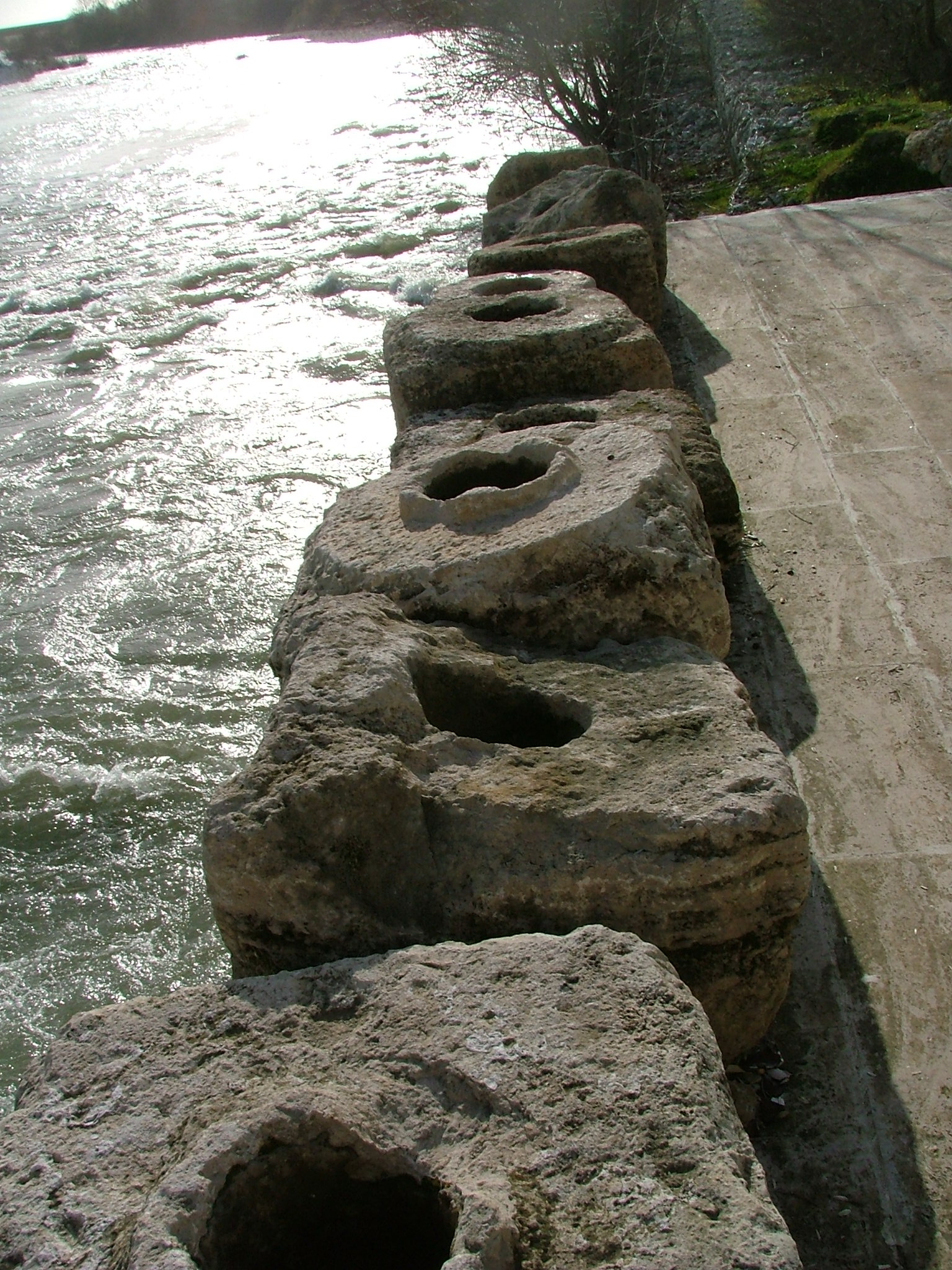
Re-used duct stones

In the early 13th century, the Seljuq Sultan Kayqubad I (1219–1237) built a new bridge over the remains of the late antique structure, which had collapsed, probably also because of an earthquake. The Seljuq builders followed closely the course of the Roman remains, even in sections where the piers had been partly moved downstream from their original position; as a result, the Seljuq bridge features a quite sharp displacement. This zigzag course, formed by two successive, 90 degree bends, in combination with the pointed arches give the Seljuq-era bridge an appearance that is quite distinct from that of its Roman precursor.

The Seljuq bridge is also considerably reduced in dimensions, something that allowed the full use of the Roman remains. Thus, for instance, the reduction of the width to almost half the original made the integration of halfway surviving ancient piers possible. The medieval arches were also 4.1 m lower than the Roman ones, and the length of the bridge was shortened, so that the new bridge ramp began at the place where the Roman structure had already reached its final height level.

The bridge is mainly constructed of stone blocks, while parts of the antique structure have been reused, including the duct stones, which were built into the new ramp. Restoration works in the late 1990s in the bridge's crumbling breastwork also revealed stone inscriptions in Greek and Arabic.

== See also ==
- List of Roman bridges
- Eurymedon Bridge (Selge)

== Sources ==
- Grewe, Klaus (1999), "Im Zickzack-Kurs über den Fluß. Die römisch/seldschukische Eurymedon-Brücke von Aspendos (Türkei)" [Following a zigzag course across the river. The Roman/Seljuk Eurymedon Bridge of Aspendos, Turkey], Antike Welt (in German), vol. 30, no. 1, pp. 1–12
