= Köprüçay River =

River in Turkey

Coordinates: 36°49′48″N 31°10′23″E

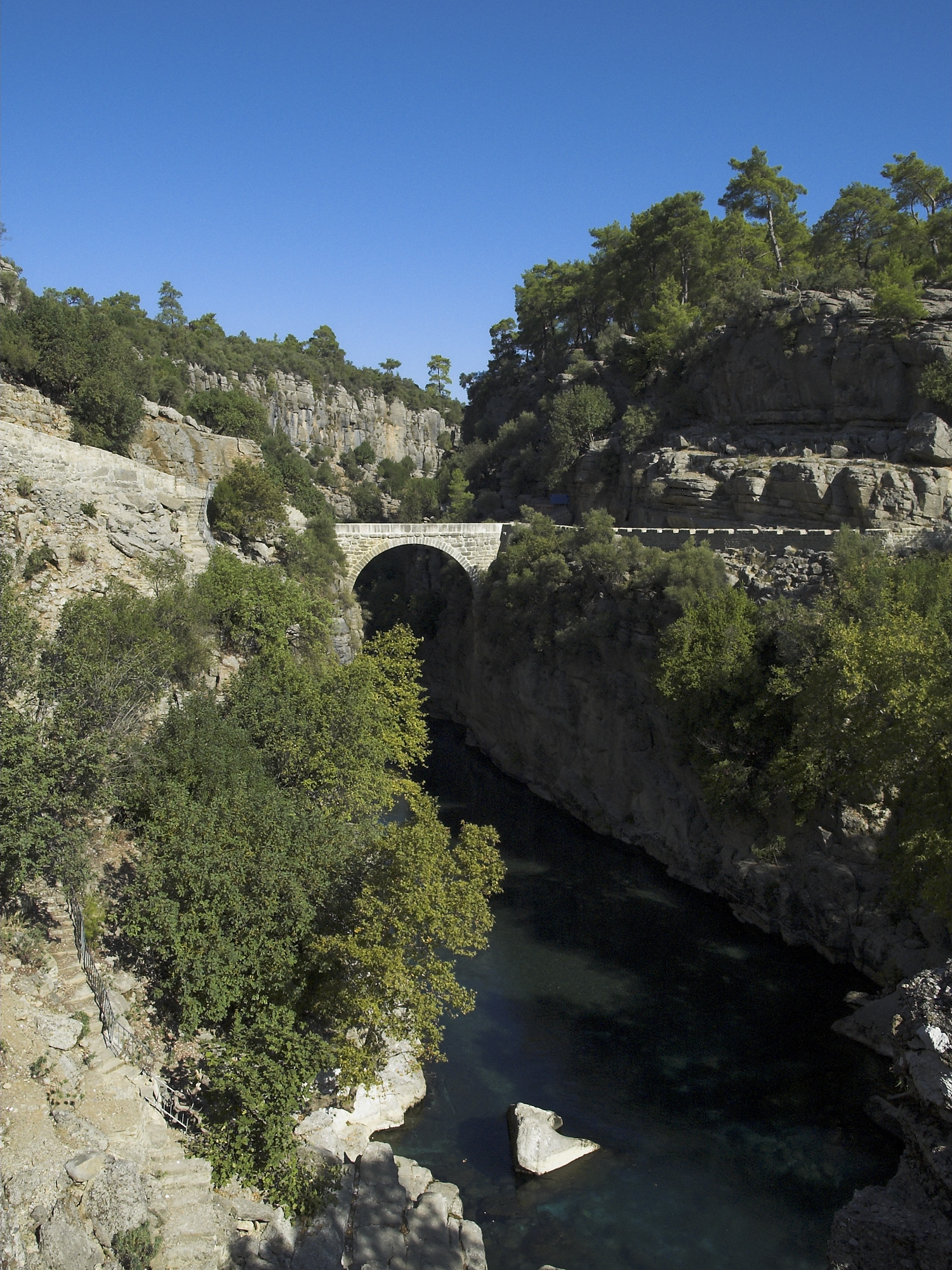
The Eurymedon valley near Selge, spanned by the intact Roman bridge

Köprüçay, ancient Eurymedon (Ancient Greek: Εὐρυμέδων), is a river that is situated in Antalya Province, Turkey, and empties into the Mediterranean.

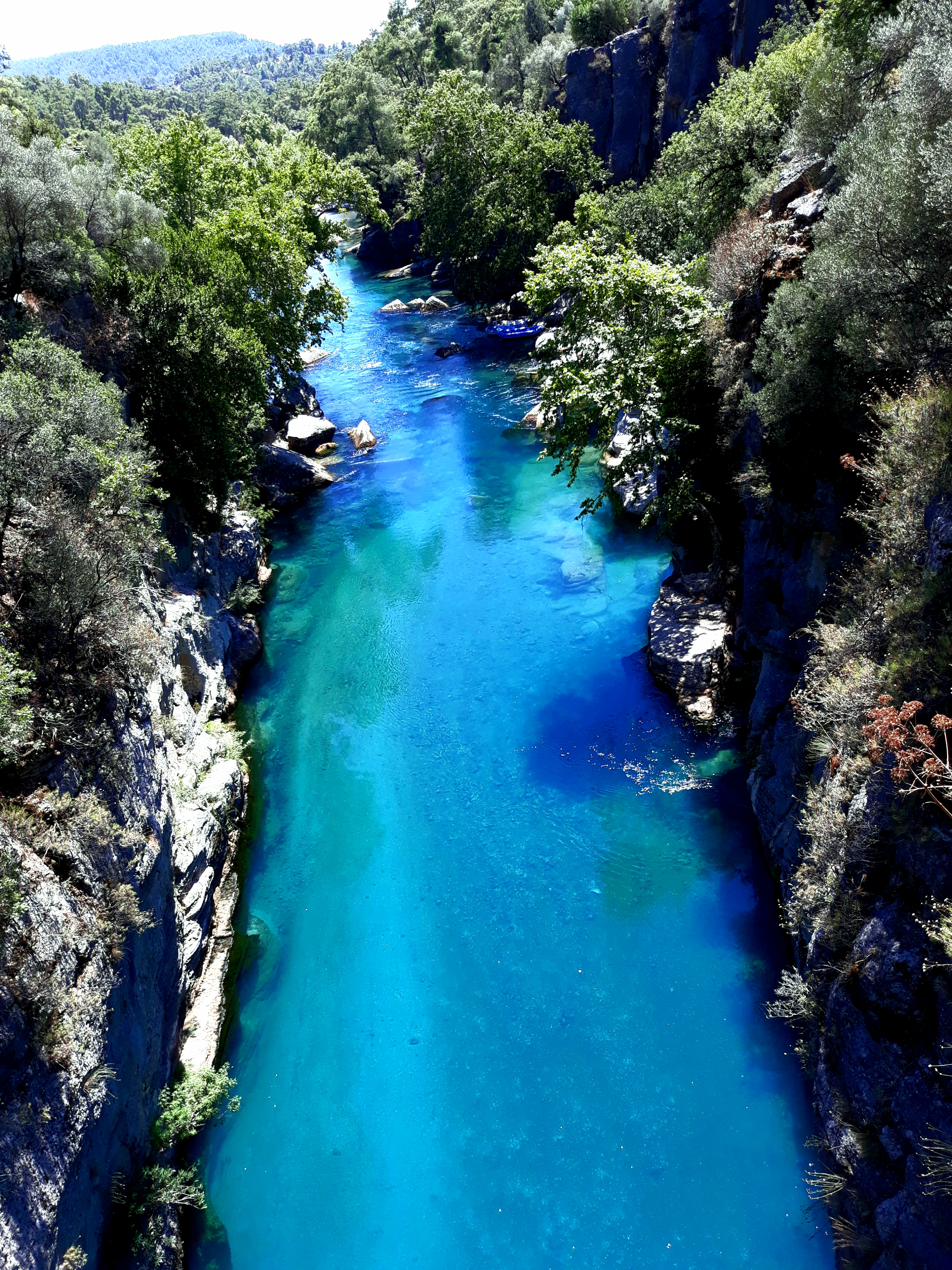
Köprülü Canyon National Park.

At its mouth, in the 460s BC (the actual date is highly disputed), the Athenian general Cimon defeated a large Persian force of ships and men moving westwards (Battle of the Eurymedon). The two land and sea battles lasted one day and included Cimon's capture or destruction of the entire Phoenician fleet of 200 triremes.

In 190 BC, a Roman fleet led by Lucius Aemilius Regillus defeated the Seleucid fleet of Antiochus III the Great, led by Hannibal, near the river.

Strabo records a lake he called Caprias near its mouth although the area is today a salt marsh. The Seljuk-era Eurymedon Bridge, which rests on Roman foundations, crosses the river at Aspendos. Further upstream, half-way on the road to ancient Selge, another Roman bridge spans the Eurymedon valley.
