= Octobot =

Octobot may refer to:

- Octobot (robot) - soft-bodied robot
- Octobot from Sonic the Hedgehog
- Octobots from Doctor Octopus
