= Articulated robot =

Robot with rotary joints

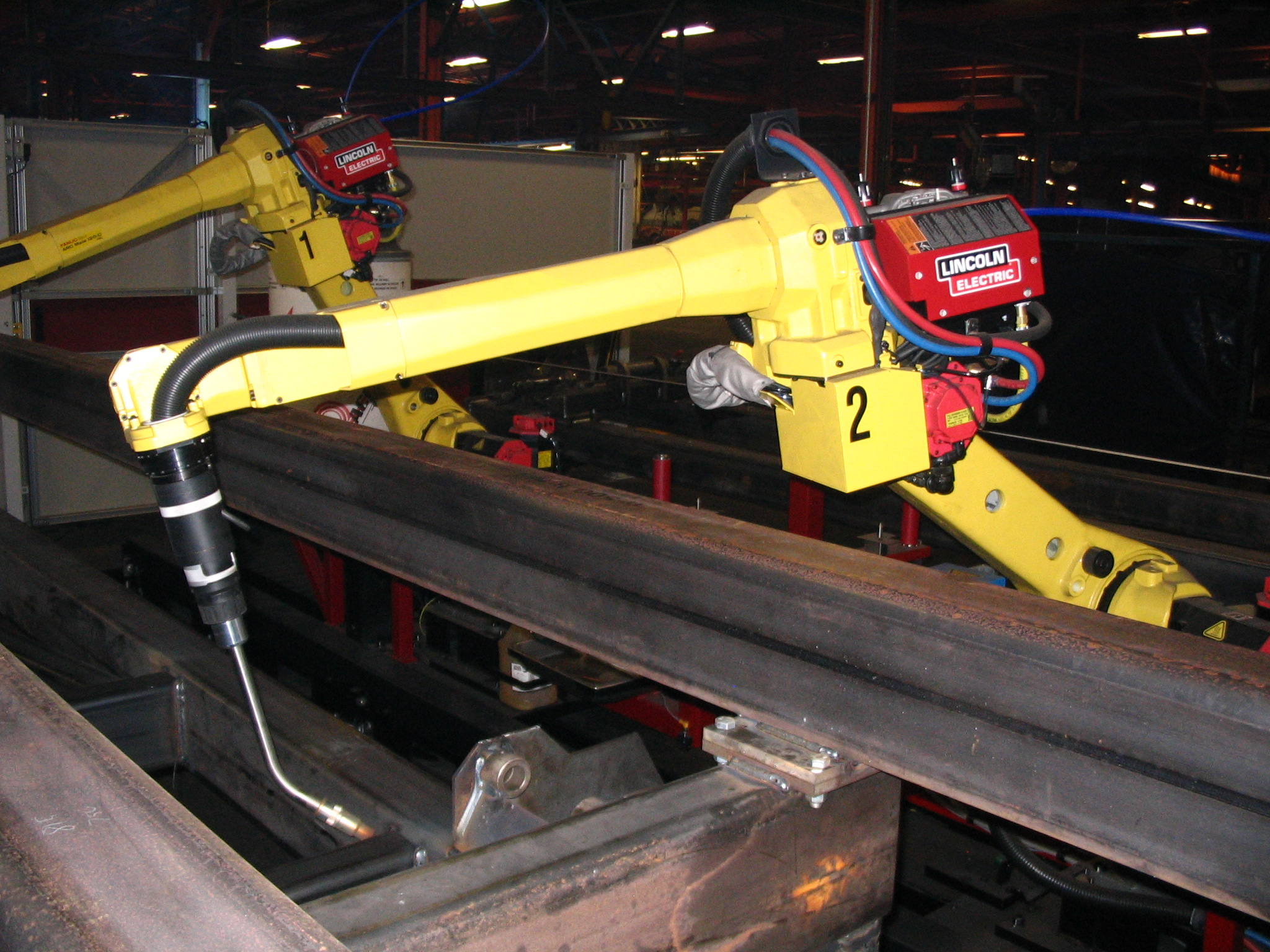
A six-axis articulated welding robot reaching into a fixture to weld

An articulated robot is a robot with rotary joints that has 6 or more degrees of freedom. This is one of the most commonly used robots in the industry today (many examples can be found from legged robots or industrial robots). Articulated robots can range from simple 6 degree-of-freedom structures to systems with 10 or more interacting joints and materials. They are powered by a variety of means, including electric motors. It is estimated that this market will reach $87.93 billion by 2032.

Some types of robots, such as robotic arms, can be articulated or non-articulated.

== Articulated robots ==
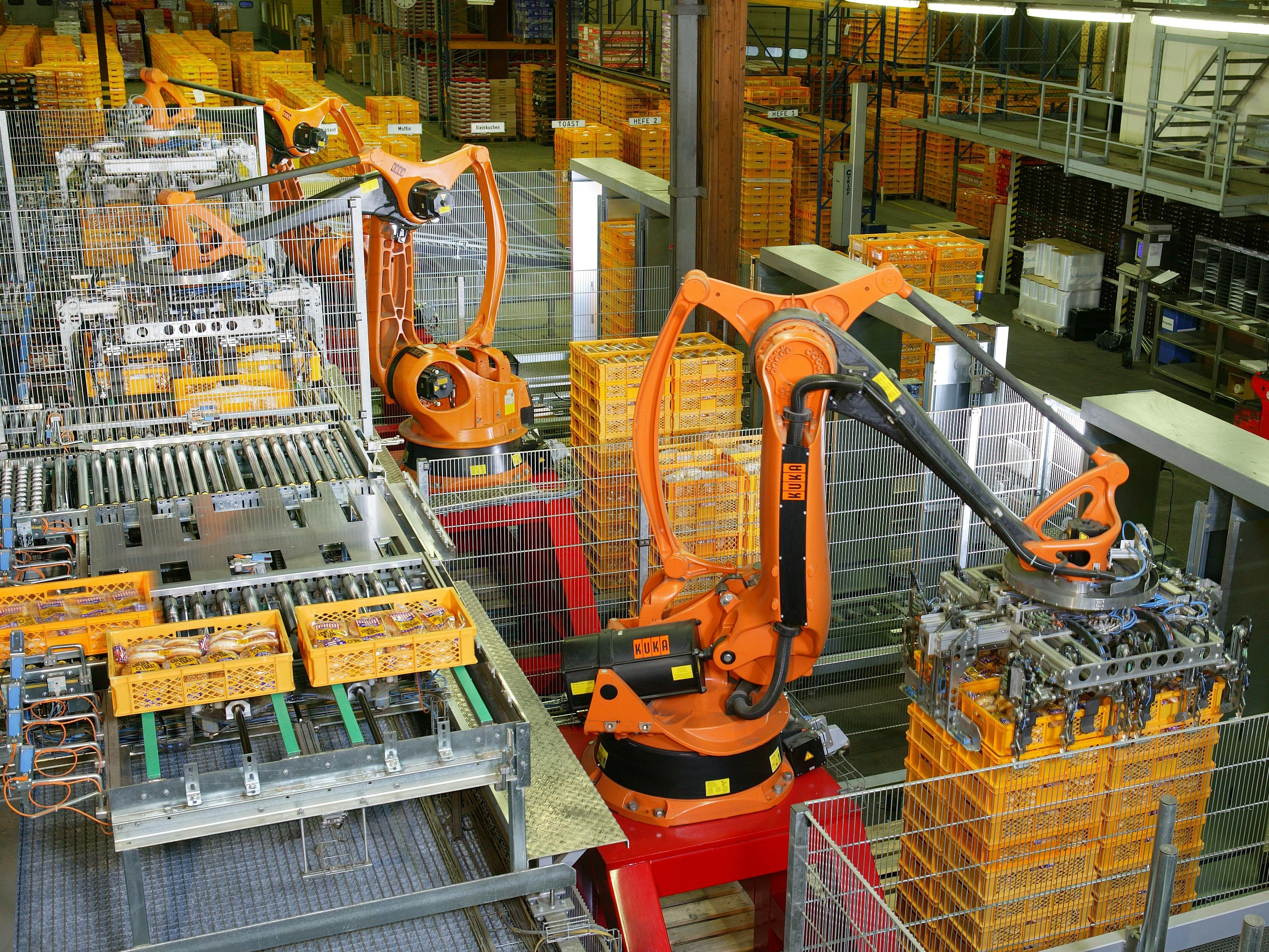
Robots palletizing food at a bakery

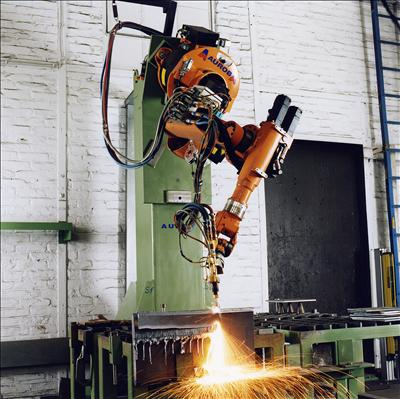
Manufacturing of steel bridges, cutting steel

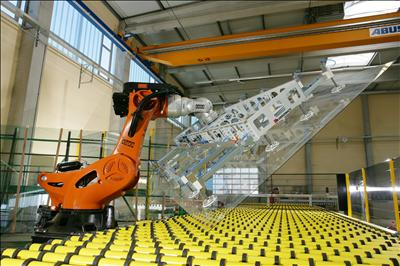
Flat-glass handling, heavy duty robot with 500 kg payload

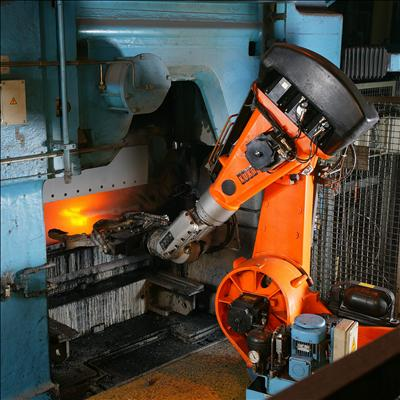
Automation in foundry industry, heat resistant robot

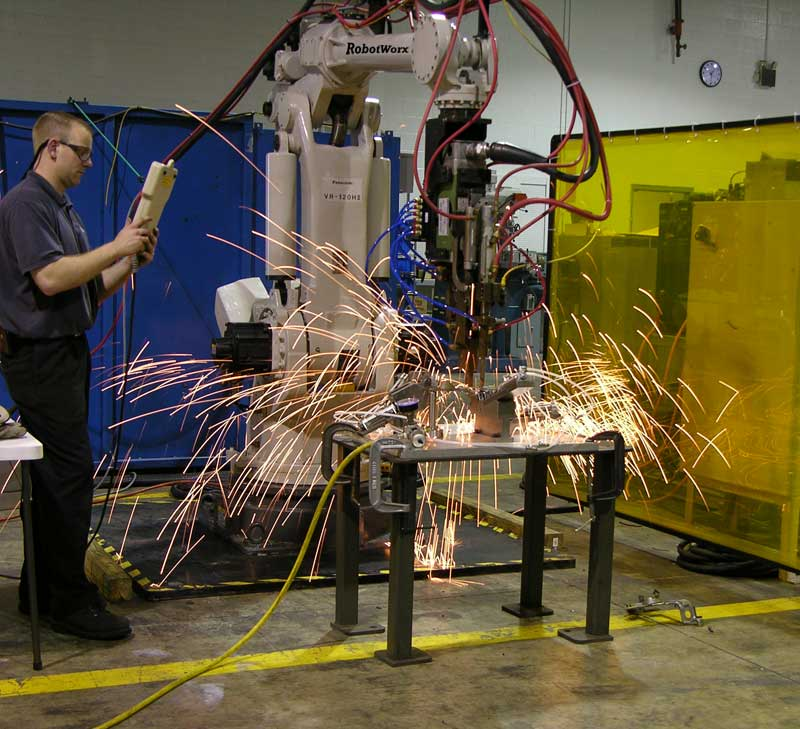
Spot welding robot

== See also ==
- Degrees of freedom (engineering)
- Articulated soft robotics
- Robotics suite
- Industrial robot
- Robotic arms and cranes used in spaceflight:
  - Canadarm, which was used on the Space Shuttle
  - Mobile Servicing System (MSS), also known as the Canadarm2, used on the ISS
  - The Japanese Remote Manipulator System, used on the ISS JEM module Kibo
  - Dextre, also known as the Special Purpose Dexterous Manipulator (SPDM), used on the ISS
  - Strela, a manually operated arm used on the Russian Orbital Segment (ROS) of the ISS to perform similar tasks as the Mobile Servicing System
  - European Robotic Arm, a fifth robotic arm installed on the ISS in 2021
