= Stretchable electronics =

Electronics that can bend and stretch

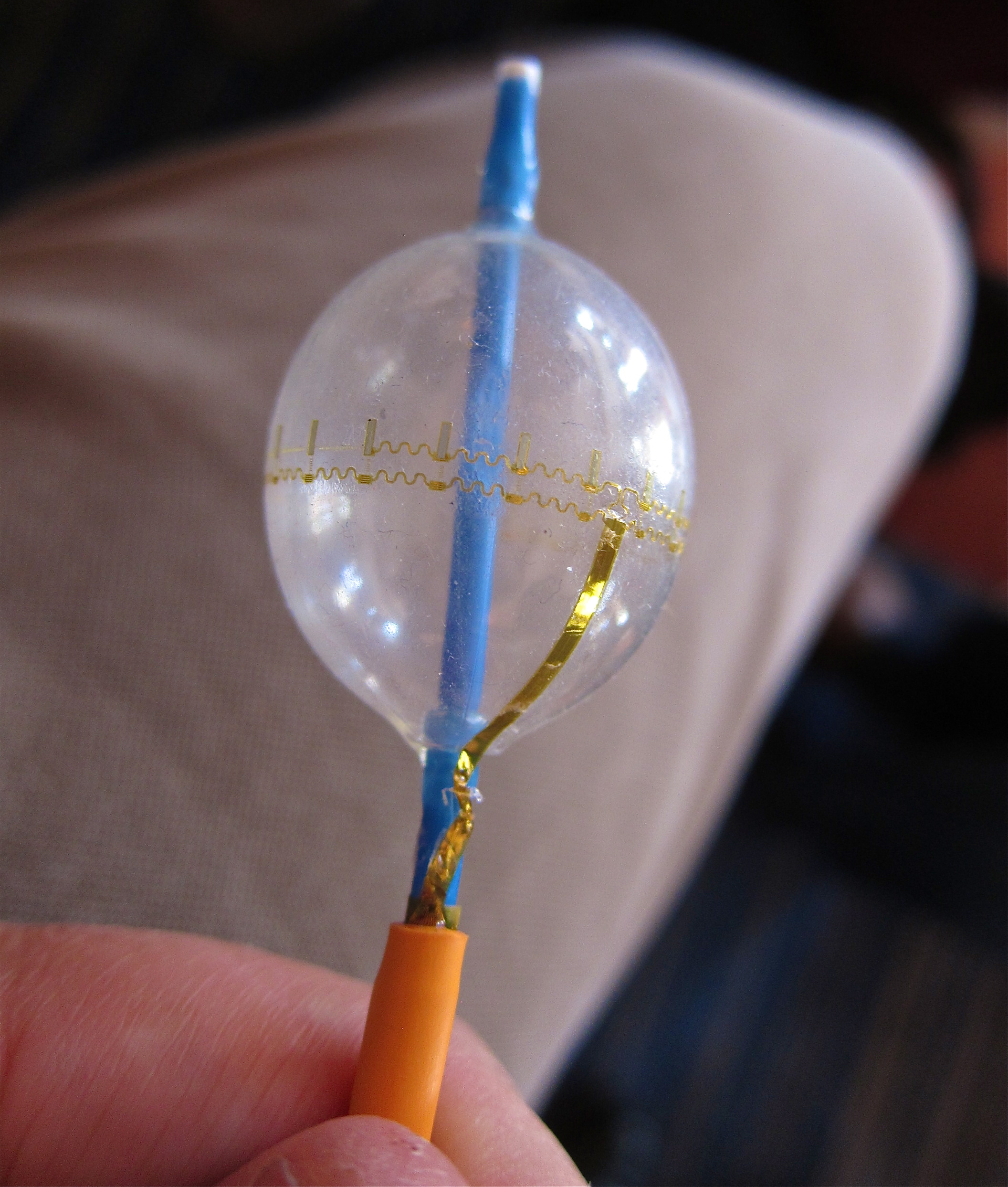
Wrapped around this cardiac balloon catheter are temperature and EKG sensors and LEDs. The wires are stretchable coils. It is manufactured with a lift-off MEMS process. The etched silicon is then stretched and attached to a polymer backing. Silicon usage is minimized over the substrate and the ensemble is quite flexible, to survive inflation and deflation of the balloon.

Stretchable electronics, also known as elastic electronics or elastic circuits, is a group of technologies for building electronic circuits by depositing or embedding electronic devices and circuits onto stretchable substrates such as silicones or polyurethanes, to make a completed circuit that can experience large strains without failure. In the simplest case, stretchable electronics can be made by using the same components used for rigid printed circuit boards, with the rigid substrate cut (typically in a serpentine pattern) to enable in-plane stretchability. However, many researchers have also sought intrinsically stretchable conductors, such as liquid metals.

One of the major challenges in this domain is designing the substrate and the interconnections to be stretchable, rather than flexible (see Flexible electronics) or rigid (Printed Circuit Boards). Typically, polymers are chosen as substrates or material to embed. When bending the substrate, the outermost radius of the bend will stretch (see Strain in an Euler–Bernoulli beam, subjecting the interconnects to high mechanical strain. Stretchable electronics often attempts biomimicry of human skin and flesh, in being stretchable, whilst retaining full functionality. The design space for products is opened up with stretchable electronics, including sensitive electronic skin for robotic devices and in vivo implantable sponge-like electronics.

== Stretchable Skin electronics ==
=== Mechanical Properties of Skin ===
Skin is composed of collagen, keratin, and elastin fibers, which provide robust mechanical strength, low modulus, tear resistance, and softness. The skin can be considered as a bilayer of epidermis and dermis. The epidermal layer has a modulus of about 140-600 kPa and a thickness of 0.05-1.5 mm. Dermis has a modulus of 2-80 kPa and a thickness of 0.3–3 mm. This bilayer skin exhibits an elastic linear response for strains less than 15% and a non linear response at larger strains. To achieve conformability, it is preferable for devices to match the mechanical properties of the epidermis layer when designing skin-based stretchy electronics.

=== Tuning Mechanical Properties ===
Conventional high performance electronic devices are made of inorganic materials such as silicon, which is rigid and brittle in nature and exhibits poor biocompatibility due to mechanical mismatch between the skin and the device, making skin integrated electronics applications difficult. To solve this challenge, researchers employed the method of constructing flexible electronics in the form of ultrathin layers. The resistance to bending of a material object (Flexural rigidity) is related to the third power of the thickness, according to the Euler-Bernoulli equation for a beam. It implies that objects with less thickness can bend and stretch more easily. As a result, even though the material has a relatively high Young's modulus, devices manufactured on ultrathin substrates exhibit a decrease in bending stiffness and allow bending to a small radius of curvature without fracturing. Thin devices have been developed as a result of significant advancements in the field of nanotechnology, fabrication, and manufacturing. The aforementioned approach was used to create devices composed of 100-200 nm thick silicon (Si) nano membranes deposited on thin flexible polymeric substrates.

Furthermore, structural design considerations can be used to tune the mechanical stability of the devices. Engineering the original surface structure allows us to soften the stiff electronics. Buckling, island connection, and the Kirigami concept have all been employed successfully to make the entire system stretchy.

Mechanical buckling can be used to create wavy structures on elastomeric thin substrates. This feature improves the device's stretchability. The buckling approach was used to create Si nanoribbons from single crystal Si on an elastomeric substrate. The study demonstrated the device could bear a maximum strain of 10% when compressed and stretched.

In the case of island interconnect, the rigid material connects with flexible bridges made from different geometries, such as zig-zag, serpentine-shaped structures, etc., to reduce the effective stiffness, tune the stretchability of the system, and elastically deform under applied strains in specific directions. It has been demonstrated that serpentine-shaped structures have no significant effect on the electrical characteristics of epidermal electronics. It has also been shown that the entanglement of the interconnects, which oppose the movement of the device above the substrate, causes the spiral interconnects to stretch and deform significantly more than the serpentine structures. CMOS inverters constructed on a polydimethylsiloxane (PDMS) substrate employing 3D island interconnect technologies demonstrated 140% strain at stretching.

Kirigami is built around the concept of folding and cutting in 2D membranes. This contributes to an increase in the tensile strength of the substrate, as well as its out-of-plane deformation and stretchability. These 2D structures can subsequently be turned to 3D structures with varied topography, shape, and size controllability via the Buckling process, resulting in interesting properties and applications.

=== Energy ===
Several stretchable energy storage devices and supercapacitors are made using carbon-based materials such as single-walled carbon nanotubes (SWCNTs). A study by Li et al. showed a stretchable supercapacitor (composed of buckled SWCNTs macrofilm and elastomeric separators on an elastic PDMS substrate), that performed dynamic charging and discharging. The key drawback of this stretchable energy storage technology is the low specific capacitance and energy density, although this can potentially be improved by the incorporation of redox materials, for example the SWNT/MnO_{2} electrode. Another approach to creating a stretchable energy storage device is the use of origami folding principles. The resulting origami battery achieved significant linear and areal deformability, large twistability and bendability.

=== Medicine ===
Stretchable electronics could be integrated into smart garments to interact seamlessly with the human body and detect diseases or collect patient data in a non-invasive manner. For example, researchers from Seoul National University and MC10 (a flexible-electronics company) have developed a patch that is able to detect glucose levels in sweat and can deliver the medicine needed on demand (insulin or metformin). The patch consists of graphene riddled with gold particles and contains sensors that are able to detect temperature, pH level, glucose, and humidity. Stretchable electronics also permit developers to create soft robots, to implement minimally invasive surgeries in hospitals. Especially when it comes to surgeries of the brain and every millimeter is important, such robots may have a more precise scope of action than a human.

=== Tactile sensing ===
Rigid electronics does not typically conform well to soft, biological organisms and tissue. Since stretchable electronics is not limited by this, some researchers try to implement it as sensors for touch, or tactile sensing. One way of achieving this is to make an array of conductive OFET (Organic Field Effect Transistors) forming a network that can detect local changes in capacitance, which gives the user information about where the contact occurred. This could have potential use in robotics and virtual reality applications.

== See also ==
- Flexible electronics
- Soft robotics
- Stretch sensor
