= Flexible electronics =

Mounting of electronic devices on flexible plastic substrates

Image of flexible printed circuits before de-panelization.

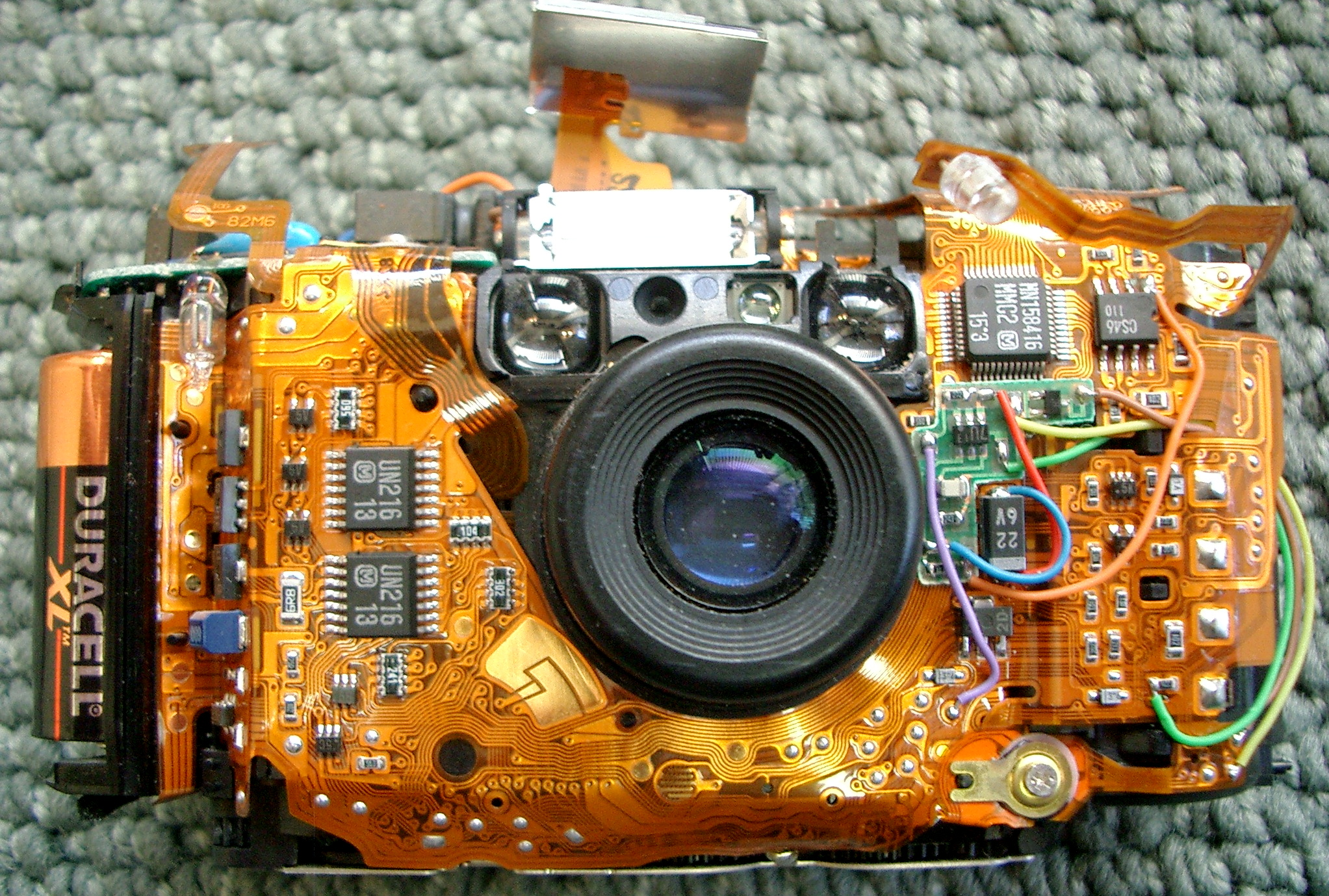
An Olympus Stylus camera without the case, showing the flex circuit assembly.

Flexible electronics, also known as flex circuits, encompass various technologies that are used for assembling electronic circuits by mounting electronic components on flexible plastic substrates, such as polyimide, PEEK, or transparent conductive polyester film. Additionally, flex circuits can have the form of screen-printed silver circuits on polyester. Flexible electronic assemblies may be manufactured using identical components used for rigid printed circuit boards, allowing the board to conform to a desired shape or to flex during its use.

== Manufacturing ==
Flexible printed circuits (FPCs) are developed using photolithographic technology. An alternative approach to making flexible foil circuits or flexible flat cables (FFCs) is laminating very thin (0.07 mm) copper strips in between two layers of PET. These PET layers, typically 0.05 mm thick, are coated with an adhesive that is thermosetting, and will be activated during the lamination process. FPCs and FFCs have several advantages in many applications:

- Tightly assembled electronic packages, where electrical connections are required in 3 axes, such as cameras (static application).
- Electrical connections where the assembly is required to flex during its normal use, such as folding cell phones (dynamic application).
- Electrical connections between sub-assemblies to replace wire harnesses, which are heavier and bulkier, such as in cars, rockets, and satellites.
- Electrical connections where board thickness or space constraints are driving factors.

=== Advantages of FPCs ===
- Potential to replace multiple rigid boards or connectors
- Single-sided circuits are ideal for dynamic or high-flex applications
- Stacked FPCs in various configurations

=== Disadvantages of FPCs ===
- Cost increase over rigid PCBs
- Increased risk of damage during handling or use
- More difficult assembly process
- Repair and rework can be difficult or impossible
- Generally worse panel utilization resulting in increased cost

== Applications ==
Flex circuits are often used as connectors in various applications where flexibility, space savings, or production constraints limit the serviceability of rigid circuit boards or hand wiring.

Most flexible circuits are passive wiring structures that are used to interconnect electronic components such as integrated circuits, resistors, capacitors, and the like; however, some are used only for making interconnections between other electronic assemblies either directly or by means of connectors. Consumer electronics devices make use of flexible circuits in cameras, personal entertainment devices, calculators, or exercise monitors. Flexible circuits are found in industrial and medical devices where numerous interconnections are required in a compact package. Cellular telephones are another widespread example of flexible circuits.

=== Input Devices ===
A common application of flex circuits is in input devices such as computer keyboards; most keyboards use flex circuits for the switch matrix.

=== Displays ===
==== LCD displays ====
In LCD fabrication, glass is used as a substrate. If thin flexible plastic or metal foil is used as the substrate instead, the entire system can be flexible, as the film deposited on top of the substrate is usually very thin, on the order of a few micrometres.

==== OLED displays ====
Organic light-emitting diodes (OLEDs) are generally used instead of a back-light for flexible displays, making a flexible organic light-emitting diode display.

=== Flexible batteries ===
Flexible batteries are batteries, both primary and secondary, that are designed to be conformal and flexible, unlike traditional rigid ones.

=== Automotive circuits ===
In the automotive field, flexible circuits are used in instrument panels, under-hood controls, circuits to be concealed within the headliner of the cabin, as well as in ABS systems.

=== Printers ===
In computer peripherals, flexible circuits are used on the moving print head of printers and to connect signals to the moving arm carrying the read/write heads of disk drives.

=== Solar cells ===
Flexible, thin-film solar cells have been developed for powering satellites. These cells are lightweight, can be rolled up for launch, and are easily deployable, making them a good match for the application. They can also be sewn into backpacks or outerwear, among many other types of consumer-oriented applications.

The growing markets related with flexible and/or portable electronics, such as for self-powered IoT systems, have driven the development of bendable thin-film photovoltaics (PV) in view of enhancing the energetic autonomy of such off-grid devices. It has been shown that this class of PV technologies is already capable of reaching high solar-to-electricity efficiencies, at the level of rigid wafer-based solar cells, particularly when integrated with effective light-trapping structures. Such photonic schemes allow high broadband absorption in the thin PV absorber materials, despite their reduced thickness required for mechanical bendability.

=== Skin-like circuits ===
In December 2021, engineers from Keio University in Tokyo and Stanford University announced the creation of stretchable and skin-like semiconductor circuits. In the future, these wearable electronics may be used to send health data to doctors wirelessly.

=== Printed Electronics ===
Printed electronics are in use or under consideration, including wireless sensors in packaging, skin patches that communicate with the internet, and buildings that detect leaks to enable preventative maintenance. Most of these applications are still in the prototyping and development stages. There is a particularly growing interest in flexible smart electronic systems, including photovoltaic, sensing, and processing devices, driven by the desire to extend and integrate the latest advances in (opto-)electronic technologies into a broad range of low-cost (even disposable) consumer products of everyday life, and as tools to bring together the digital and physical worlds.

Norwegian company ThinFilm demonstrated roll-to-roll printed organic memory in 2009.

Another company, Rotimpres, based in Spain, has successfully introduced applications on different markets as for instance; heaters for smart furniture or to prevent mist and capacitive switches for keyboards on white goods and industrial machines.

== History ==
Patents issued at the turn of the 20th century show interest in flat electrical conductors sandwiched between layers of insulating material. The resulting electrical circuits were to serve in early telephony switching applications. One of the earliest descriptions of what could be called a flex circuit was unearthed by Dr Ken Gilleo and disclosed in a 1903 English patent by Albert Hansen that described a construction consisting of flat metal conductors on paraffin-coated paper. Moreover, Thomas Edison’s lab books from the period indicate that he was thinking of coating cellulose gum applied to linen paper with graphite powder to create what would have clearly been flexible circuits, though no evidence indicates that it was reduced to practice.

The 1947 publication "Printed Circuit Techniques" by Brunetti and Curtis includes a brief discussion of creating circuits on what would have been flexible insulating materials (e.g., paper). In the 1950s, Dahlgren and Sanders made significant strides in developing and patenting processes for printing and etching flat conductors on flexible base materials to replace wire harnesses. An advertisement from the 1950s, placed by Photocircuits Corporation, demonstrated their interest in flexible circuits.

Flexible circuits are known by various names around the world, such as flexible printed wiring, flex print, flexi circuits, are used in many products. Credit is due to the efforts of Japanese electronics packaging engineers who have found ways to employ flexible circuit technology. Flexible circuits are one of the fastest-growing interconnection product market segments. One variation on flexible circuit technology is called "flexible electronics". It involves the integration of both active and passive functions in the device.

== Flexible circuit structures ==
Flexible circuits display significant variation in their construction.

=== Single-sided flex circuits ===
Single-sided flexible circuits have a conductor layer made of either a metal or conductive (metal filled) polymer on a flexible dielectric film. Component termination features are accessible only from one side. Holes may be formed in the base film to allow component leads to pass through for interconnection, normally by soldering. Single sided flex circuits can be fabricated with or without such protective coatings as cover layers or cover coats, however the use of a protective coating over circuits is the most common practice. The development of surface mounted devices on sputtered conductive films has enabled the production of transparent LED Films, which is used in LED Glass but also in flexible automotive lighting composites.

=== Double access or back-bared flex circuits ===
Double access flex, also known as back-bared flex, are flexible circuits that have a single conductor layer, but allow access to selected features of the conductor pattern from both sides. While this type of circuit has benefits, the specialized processing requirements for accessing the features limits its use.

=== Sculptured flex circuits ===
Manufacturing sculptured flex circuits involves a special flex circuit multi-step etching method that yields a flexible circuit having finished copper conductors wherein the conductor thickness differs at various places along their length. (i.e., the conductors are thin in flexible areas and thick at interconnection points).

=== Double-sided flex circuits ===
Double-sided flex circuits have two conductor layers. They can be fabricated with or without plated through holes, though the plated through hole variation is much more common. When constructed without plated through holes, connection features are accessed from one side only, and the circuit is defined as a "Type V (5)" according to military specifications. Because of the plated through hole, terminations are provided on both sides of the circuit, thus allowing components to be placed on either side. Depending on design requirements, double-sided flex circuits can be fabricated with protective coverlayers on one, both or neither side of the completed circuit, but are most commonly produced with the protective layer on both sides. One major advantage is that it allows easy crossover connections. Many single sided circuits are built on a double sided substrate because of the crossover connections. An example of this use is the circuit that connects a mousepad to the motherboard. All connections on that circuit are located on only one side of the substrate, except a small crossover connection that uses the other side.

=== Multilayer flex circuits ===
Flex circuits with three or more layers of conductors are known as multilayer flex circuits. Commonly the layers are interconnected by means of plated through holes, though this is not required because it is possible to provide openings to access lower circuit level features. The layers may or may not be continuously laminated together throughout the construction with the exception of the areas occupied by through-holes. Discontinuous lamination is common in cases requiring maximum flexibility. This is accomplished by leaving unbonded the areas where flexing or bending is to occur.

=== Rigid-flex circuits ===
Rigid-flex circuits are a hybrid combining rigid and flexible substrates laminated into a single structure. Rigid-flex circuits are not rigidized flex constructions, which are flex circuits to which a stiffener is attached to support the weight of the components. A rigidized or stiffened flex circuit can have one or more conductor layers. The terms represent quite different products.

The layers are normally interconnected by plated through holes. Rigid-flex circuits are often chosen by military product designers and increasingly in commercial products. Compaq Computer chose the approach for laptop computer boards in the 1990s. While the computer's main rigid-flex PCBA did not flex during use, subsequent Compaq designs utilized rigid-flex circuits for the hinged display cable, passing tens of thousands of flexures during testing. By 2013, the use of rigid-flex circuits in consumer laptop computers had become common.

Rigid-flex boards are normally multilayer structures; however, two metal layer constructions are sometimes used.

=== Polymer thick film flex circuits ===
Polymer thick film (PTF) flex circuits print circuit elements onto a polymer film. They are typically single conductor layer structures, however two or more metal layers can be printed sequentially separated by printed insulating layers. While lower in conductivity and thus limited to certain applications, PTF circuits have found a home in low-power applications at slightly higher voltages. Keyboards are a common application.

== Flexible circuit materials ==
Each element of the flex circuit construction must be able to consistently meet the demands placed upon it for the life of the product. In addition, the material must work reliably in concert with the other elements of the flexible circuit construction to assure ease of manufacture and reliability. Following are brief descriptions of the basic elements of flex circuit construction and their functions.

=== Base material ===
The base material is the flexible polymer film which provides the foundation for the laminate. Under normal circumstances, the flex circuit base material provides most primary physical and electrical properties of the flexible circuit. In the case of adhesiveless circuit constructions, the base material provides all of the characteristic properties.

While a wide range of thickness is possible, most flexible films are provided in a narrow range of relatively thin dimension from 12 μm to 125 μm (1/2 mil to 5 mils) but thinner and thicker material are possible. Thinner materials are of course more flexible and for most material, stiffness increase is proportional to the cube of thickness. Thus for example, means that if the thickness is doubled, the material becomes eight times stiffer and will only deflect 1/8 as much under the same load.

Cu and Al wires and contact pads on freestanding Parylene C

There are a number of different materials used as base films including: polyester (PET, polyethylene terephthalate), polyimide (PI), polyethylene naphthalate (PEN), polyetherimide (PEI), along with various fluoropolymers (FEP) and copolymers. Polyimide films are most prevalent owing to their blend of advantageous electrical, mechanical, chemical and thermal properties. PET is also common due to its cheap cost. PET is not as strong (needs thicker films) and has lower thermal resistance. On the other hand, it is not as moisture-sensitive and can be made fully transparent. More recently, Parylene-based ultra-thin (5 to 20 µm), flexible circuit boards have been demonstrated. Because the material is compatible with cleanroom technologies such as photolithography, CMP, as well as wet and dry etching, electronic structures can be directly fabricated and patterned on the substrate, enabling higher-level integration schemes. While parylene-based printed circuit boards are slightly more expensive than polyimide, they offer a high material and process compatibility and improved miniaturization capabilities. Parylene’s dielectric loss factor is lower than that of polyimide, which makes it well-suited for high-frequency applications. Parylene’s transparency in the visible and IR spectrum also allows for applications in the field of optics and integrated photonics. Furthermore, Parylene-based wafer bonding enables more sophisticated 3D integration processes.

=== Bonding adhesive ===
Adhesives are used as the bonding medium for creating a laminate. When it comes to temperature resistance, the adhesive is typically the performance limiting element of a laminate especially when polyimide is the base material. Because of the earlier difficulties associated with polyimide adhesives, many polyimide flex circuits presently employ adhesive systems of different polymer families. However some newer thermoplastic polyimide adhesives are making important in-roads.

As with the base films, adhesives come in different thickness. Thickness selection is typically a function of the application. For example, different adhesive thickness is commonly used in the creation of cover layers in order to meet the fill demands of different copper foil thickness which may be encountered.

=== Metal foil ===
A metal foil is most commonly used as the conductive element of a flexible laminate. The metal foil is the material from which the circuit paths are normally etched. A wide variety of metal foils of varying thickness are available from which to choose and create a flex circuit, however copper foils serve the vast majority of all flexible circuit applications. Copper's excellent balance of cost and physical and electrical performance attributes make it an excellent choice. There are actually many different types of copper foil. The IPC identifies eight different types of copper foil for printed circuits divided into two much broader categories, electrodeposited and wrought, each having four sub-types.) As a result, there are a number of different types of copper foil available for flex circuit applications to serve the varied purposes of different end products. With most copper foil, a thin surface treatment is commonly applied to one side of the foil to improve its adhesion to the base film. Copper foils are of two basic types: wrought (rolled) and electrodeposited and their properties are quite different. Rolled and annealed foils are the most common choice, however thinner films which are electroplated are becoming increasingly popular.

In certain non standard cases, the circuit manufacturer may be called upon to create a specialty laminate by using a specified alternative metal foil, such as a special copper alloy or other metal foil in the construction. This is accomplished by laminating the foil to a base film with or without an adhesive depending on the nature and properties of the base film.

== Flexible circuit industry standards and specifications ==
Specifications are developed to provide a common ground of understanding of what a product should look like and how it should perform. Standards are developed directly by manufacturer's associations such as the Association Connecting Electronics Industries (IPC) and by users of flexible circuits.

== Scientific Publications ==
IEEE Journal on Flexible Electronics (J-FLEX)

== Scientific Conferences ==
IEEE International Flexible Electronics Technology Conference (IFETC)

== See also ==
- Amorphous silicon
- Copper indium gallium selenide (CIGS)
- Flexible circuit
- Flexible keyboard
- Kapton
- Organic electronics
- Polyimide Film
- Rollable electronics
- Printed electronics
- Roll-to-roll
- Soft robotics
- Solar vehicle
- Stretchable electronics
- Stretch sensor
- Thin film
- Zero insertion force
