= Hemolymph =

Bloodlike fluid in arthropods

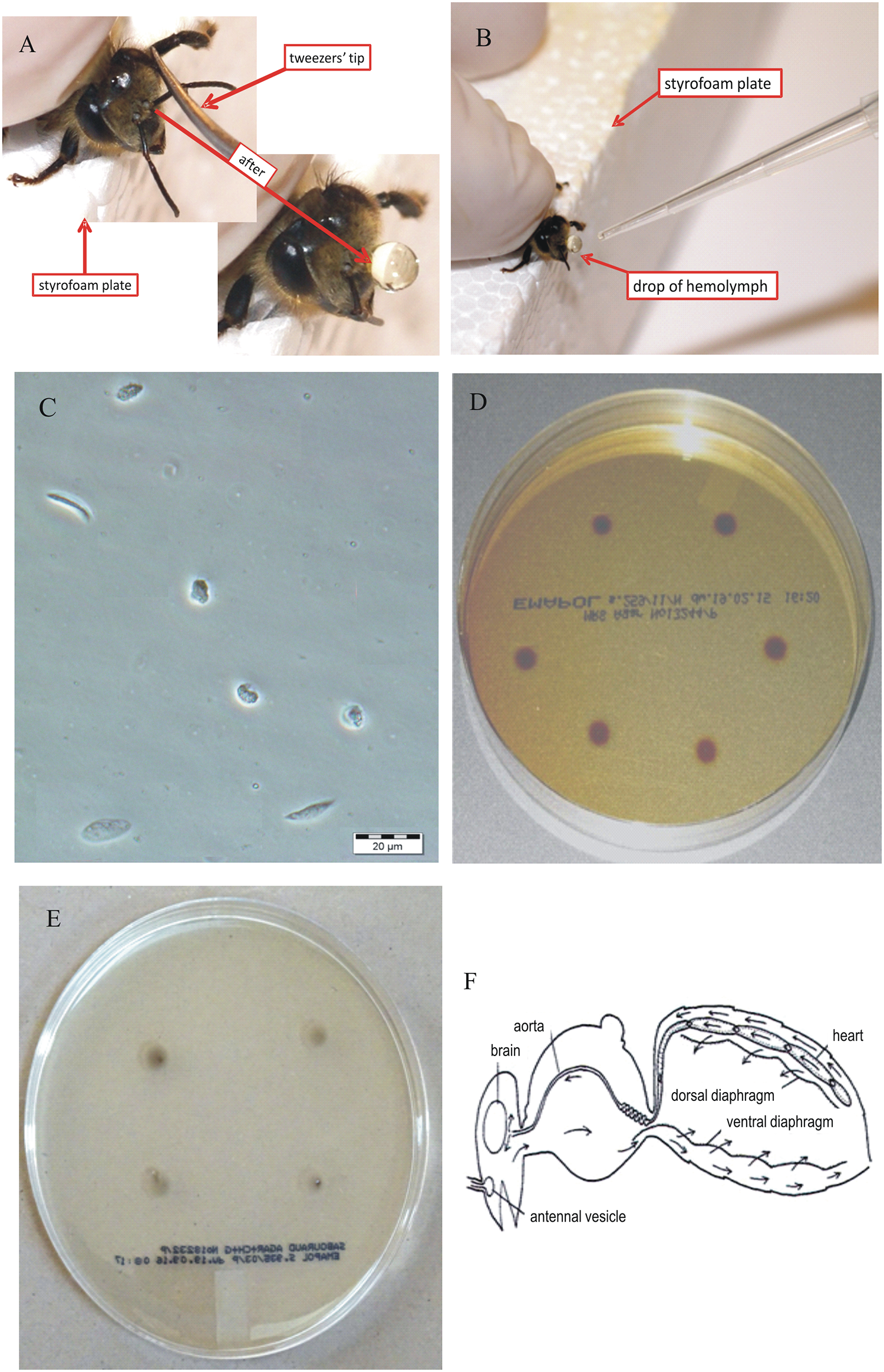
Collection of hemolymph from a worker honeybee.

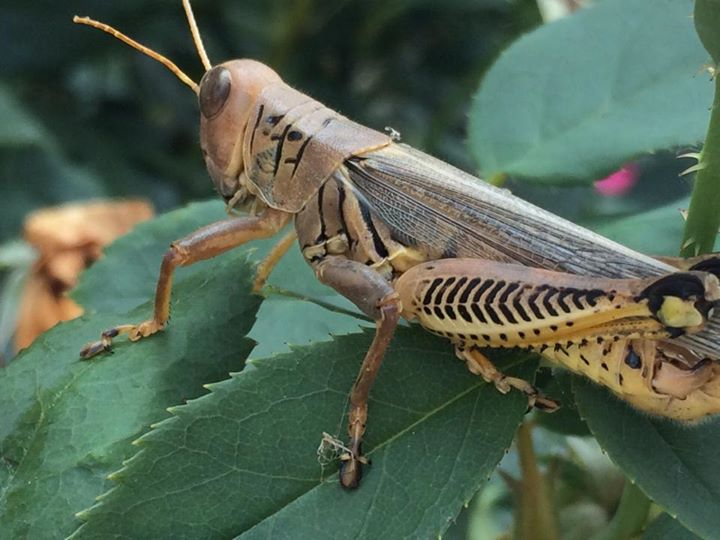
A grasshopper has an open circulatory system, where hemolymph moves through interconnected sinuses or hemocoels, spaces surrounding the organs.

Above is a diagram of an open circulatory system. An open circulatory system is made up of a heart, vessels, and hemolymph. This diagram shows how the hemolymph is circulated throughout the body of a grasshopper. The hemolymph is first pumped through the heart, into the aorta, dispersed into the head and throughout the hemocoel, then back through the ostia that are located in the heart, closing the circuit.

Hemolymph or haemolymph is a body fluid that circulates inside arthropod bodies transporting nutrients and oxygen to tissues, comparable to blood in vertebrates. It is composed of a plasma in which circulating immune cells called hemocytes are dispersed in addition to many plasma proteins (hemoproteins) and dissolved chemicals. It is the key component of the open circulatory system characteristic of arthropods such as insects, arachnids, myriapods and crustaceans. Some non-arthropod invertebrates such as molluscs and annelids also possess a similar hemolymphatic circulatory system.

In insects, the largest arthropod clade, the hemolymph mainly carries nutrients but not oxygen, which is supplied to the tissues separately by direct deep ventilation through an extensive tracheal system. In other arthropods, oxygen is dissolved into the hemolymph from gills, book lungs or across the cuticle and then distributed to the body tissues via the hemocoel.

== Method of transport ==
Hemolymph fills the whole interior (the hemocoel) of the animal's body and surrounds all cells.

In the grasshopper, the closed portion of the system consists of tubular hearts and an aorta running along the dorsal side of the insect. The hearts pump hemolymph into the chambers — called sinuses — of the hemocoel where exchanges of materials take place. Coordinated movements of the body muscles gradually bring the hemolymph back to the dorsal sinus surrounding the hearts. Between contractions, tiny valves — called ostia — in the walls of the hearts open and allow hemolymph to enter.

Hemolymph contains hemocyanin, a copper-based protein that turns blue when oxygenated, causing the hemolymph to turn from grey to blue-green in color. This contrasts with the iron-based hemoglobin found in the red blood cells of vertebrate blood which turns a brighter red when oxygenated.

The hemolymph of lower arthropods, including most insects, contains nutrients such as proteins and sugars but is not used for oxygen transport. These animals respirate through other means, such as tracheas. Ancestral and functional hemocyanin has, however, been found in the hemolymph of some insects. Insect hemolymph generally does not carry hemoglobin, but hemoglobin may be present in the tracheal system and may play some role in respiration there.

Muscular movements by the animal during locomotion can facilitate hemolymph movement, but diverting flow from one area to another is limited.

== Constituents ==
Hemolymph can contain nucleating agents that confer extracellular freezing protection. Such nucleating agents have been found in the hemolymph of insects of several orders, i.e., Coleoptera (beetles), Diptera (flies), and Hymenoptera.

=== Inorganic ===
Hemolymph is composed of water, inorganic salts (mostly sodium, chlorine, potassium, magnesium, and calcium), and organic compounds (mostly carbohydrates, proteins, and lipids). The primary oxygen transporter molecule is hemocyanin.

=== Amino acids ===
Arthropod hemolymph contains high levels of free amino acids. Most amino acids are present but their relative concentrations vary from species to species. Concentrations of amino acids also vary according to the arthropod stage of development. An example of this is the silkworm and its need for glycine in the production of silk.

=== Proteins ===
Proteins present in the hemolymph vary in quantity during the course of development. These proteins are classified by their functions: chroma proteins, protease inhibitors, storage, lipid transport, enzymes, the vitellogenins, and those involved in the immune responses of arthropods. Some hemolymphic proteins incorporate carbohydrates and lipids into the structure.

=== Other organic constituents ===
Nitrogen metabolism end products are present in the hemolymph in low concentrations. These include ammonia, allantoin, uric acid, and urea. Arthropod hormones are present, most notably the juvenile hormone. Trehalose can be present and sometimes in great amounts along with glucose. These sugar levels are maintained by the control of hormones. Other carbohydrates can be present. These include inositol, sugar alcohol, hexosamines, mannitol, glycerol and those components that are precursors to chitin.

Free lipids are present and are used as fuel for flight.

=== Hemocytes ===
There are free-floating cells, the hemocytes, within the hemolymph. They play a role in the arthropod immune system.

== Comparisons to vertebrates ==
This open system might appear to be inefficient compared to the closed circulatory systems of the vertebrates, but the two systems have very different demands placed on them. In vertebrates, the circulatory system is responsible for transporting oxygen to all the tissues and removing carbon dioxide from them. It is this requirement that establishes the level of performance demanded of the system. The efficiency of the vertebrate system is far greater than is needed for transporting nutrients, hormones, and so on; whereas in insects, exchange of oxygen and carbon dioxide occurs in the tracheal system. Hemolymph plays no part in the process in most insects. Only in a few insects living in low-oxygen environments are there hemoglobin-like molecules that bind oxygen and transport it to the tissues. Therefore, the demands placed upon the system are much lower. Some arthropods and most molluscs possess the copper-containing hemocyanin, however, for oxygen transport.

== Specialist uses ==
In some species, hemolymph has other uses than transporting nutrients. As the insect or arachnid grows, the hemolymph works something like a hydraulic system, enabling the insect or arachnid to expand segments before they are sclerotized. It can also be used hydraulically as a means of assisting movement, such as in arachnid locomotion. Some species of insect or arachnid are able to autohaemorrhage when they are attacked by predators. Queens of the ant genus Leptanilla are fed with hemolymph produced by the larvae. On the other hand, Pemphigus spyrothecae utilize hemolymph as an adhesive, allowing the species to stick to predators and subsequently attack the predator; it was found that with larger predators, more aphids were stuck after the predator was defeated.

== See also ==
- Insect physiology
- Respiratory system of insects

== Sources ==
- Chapman, R.F. (1998). The Insects: Structure and Function (4th ed.). Cambridge: Cambridge University Press. ISBN 978-0-521-57890-5.
