= Articulated soft robotics =

The term “soft robots” designs a broad class of robotic systems whose architecture includes soft elements, with much higher elasticity than traditional rigid robots. Articulated Soft Robots are robots with both soft and rigid parts, inspired to the muscloloskeletal system of vertebrate animals – from reptiles to birds to mammalians to humans. Compliance is typically concentrated in actuators, transmission and joints (corresponding to muscles, tendons and articulations) while structural stability is provided by rigid or semi-rigid links (corresponding to bones in vertebrates).

The other subgroup in the broad family of soft robots includes continuum soft robots, i.e. robots whose body is a deformable continuum, including its structural, actuating and sensing elements, and take inspiration from invertebrate animals such as octopuses or slugs, or parts of animals, such as an elephant trunk.

Soft robots are often designed to exhibit natural behaviours, robustness and adaptivity, and sometimes mimick the mechanical characteristics of biological systems.

== Characteristics and Design ==
Articulated Soft Robots are built taking inspiration from the intrinsic properties of muscle-skeletal system of vertebrates, whose compliant nature enables humans and animals to effectively and safely perform a large variety of tasks, ranging from walking on uneven terrains, running, and climbing, to grasping and manipulating. It also makes them resilient to dynamic, unexpected events such as environmental impacts. The interplay of vertebrates' physical properties with neural sensory-motor control makes motion energy–efficient, safe and effective.

Robots able to co-exist and co-operate with people and reach or even surpass their performance require a technology of actuators, responsible for moving and controlling the robot, which can reach the functional performance of the biological muscle and its neuro-mechanical control.

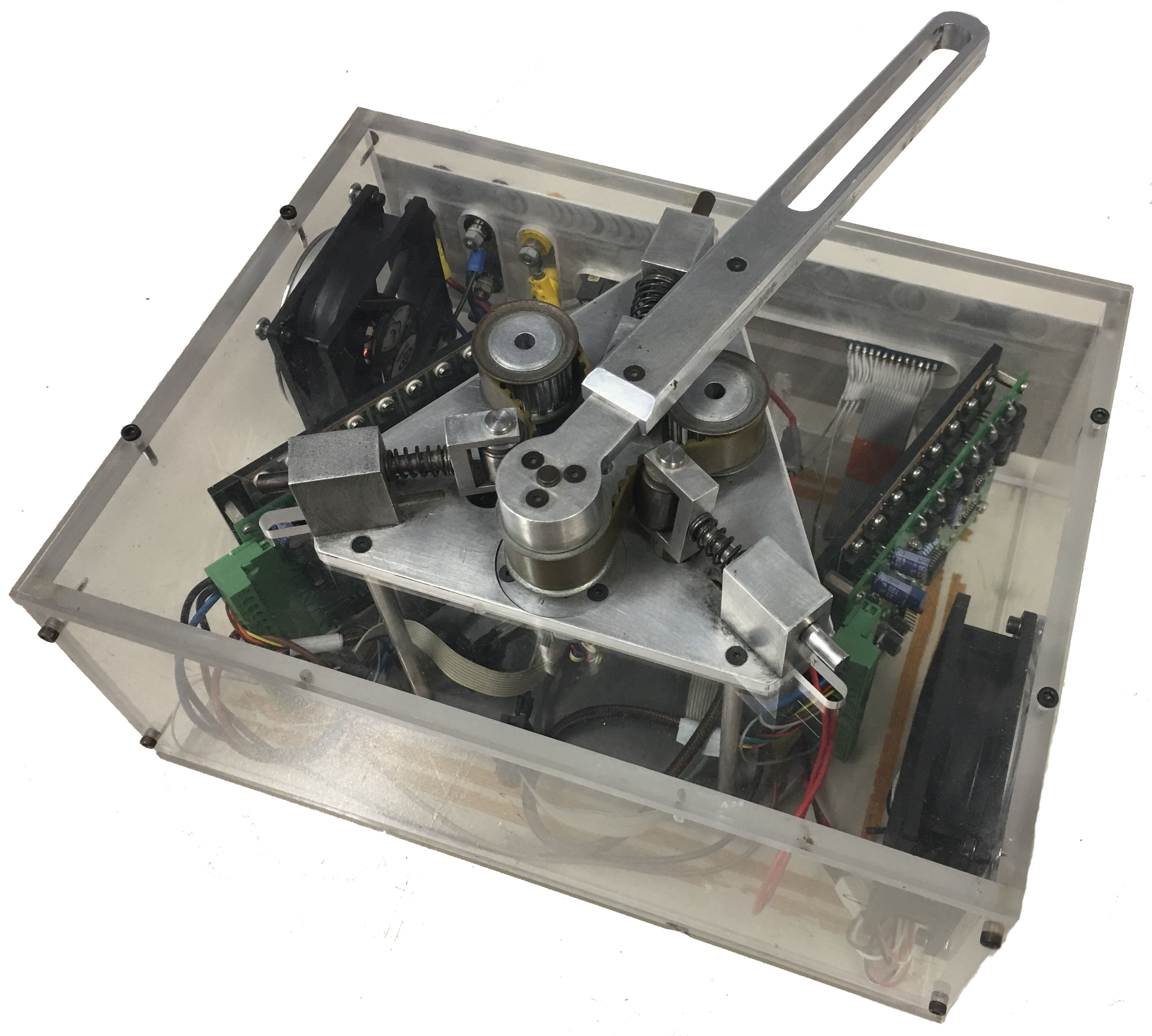
The VSA-I, a variable stiffness actuator with an agonistic-antagonistic architecture, Centro di Ricerca “Enrico Piaggio”, University of Pisa

The most promising class of actuators for soft robots is the class of Variable Impedance Actuators (VIA) and the subclass of Variable Stiffness Actuators (VSA), complex mechatronic devices that are developed to build passively compliant, robust, and dexterous robots. VSAs can vary their impedance directly at the physical level, thus without the need of an active control capable to simulate different stiffness values. The idea of varying the mechanical impedance of actuation comes directly from natural musculo-skeletal systems, which often exhibit this feature.

A class of Variable Stiffness Actuators achieve simultaneous control of the robot by using two motors antagonistically to manipulate a non-linear spring which acts as an elastic transmission between each of the motors and the moving part, so as to control both the equilibrium point of the robot, and its rigidity or compliance.

Such control model is very similar in philosophy to Equilibrium-Point hypothesis of human motor control. This similitude makes soft robotics an interesting field of research capable to exchange ideas and insights with the research community in motor neuroscience.

Variable Impedance Actuators increase the performance of the soft robotics systems in comparison with the traditional rigid robots in three key aspects: Safety, Resilience and Energy-Efficiency.

== Safety in physical human-robot interaction ==
One of the most revolutionary and challenging features of the class of articulated soft robots is Physical Human-Robot Interaction. Soft robots designed to physically interact with people are designed to coexist and cooperate with humans in applications such as assisted industrial manipulation, collaborative assembly, domestic work, entertainment, rehabilitation or medical applications. Clearly, such robots must fulfill different requirements from those typically met in conventional industrial applications: while it might be possible to relax requirements on velocity of execution and absolute accuracy, concerns such as safety and dependability become of great importance when robots have to interact with humans.

Safety can be increased in different ways. The classical methods include control and sensorization, e.g. proximity-sensitive skins, or the addition of external soft elements (soft and compliant coverings or airbags placed around the arm for increasing the energy-absorbing properties of protective layers).

Advanced sensing and control can realize a “soft” behavior via software. Articulated Soft Robotics realizes a different approach at increasing the safety level of robots interacting with humans by introducing mechanical compliance and damping directly at the mechanical design level.,

“By this approach, researchers tend to replace the sensor-based computation of a behavior and its error-prone realization using active actuator control, by its direct physical embodiment, as in the natural example. Having compliance and damping in the robot structure is by no means sufficient to ensure its safety, as it might indeed be even couterproductive for the elastic energy potentially stored: just like a human arm, a soft robot arm will need intelligent control to make it behave softly as when caressing a baby, or strongly as when punching”.

== Resilience ==
Physical interaction of a robot with its environment can also be dangerous to the robot itself. Indeed, the number of times a robot is damaged because of impacts or force overexertion is rather large.

Resilience to shocks is not only instrumental to achieve viable applications of robots in everyday life, but would also be very useful in industrial environments, substantially enlarging the scope of applicability of robot technology.

Soft robotics technologies can provide solutions that are effective in absorbing shocks and reducing accelerations: soft materials can be used as coverings or even as structural elements in robot limbs, but the main technological challenge remains with soft actuators and transmissions.

== Performance and Energy Efficiency ==
The dynamic behavior of the actuators with controllable compliance guarantees high-performance, lifelike motion and higher energy efficiency than rigid robots.

The natural dynamics of the robot can adapt to the environment, and thus the intrinsic physical behavior of the resulting system is close to the desired motion. In these circumstances, actuators would only have to inject and extract energy into and out of the system for small corrective actions, thus reducing energy consumption.

The idea of embodying desirable dynamics in the physical properties of soft robots finds its natural application in humanoid robots, having to resemble the movements of humans, or in robotic systems realized for prosthetic uses, e.g. anthropomorphic artificial hands. A relevant example of use is in and walking/running robots: indeed, the fact that natural systems change the compliance of their muscular system depending on the gait and environmental conditions, and even during the different phases of the gait, seem to indicate the potential usefulness of Variable Impedance Actuators (VIA) for locomotion. An emerging trend of use of VIA technologies is connected to the growing of a novel category of industrial robots connected to Industry4.0, the Co-Bots.

Exploration of soft robots’ full potential is leading to more and more applications in which the robots overcome conventional- robot performance, and it is widely believed that more applications are yet to come

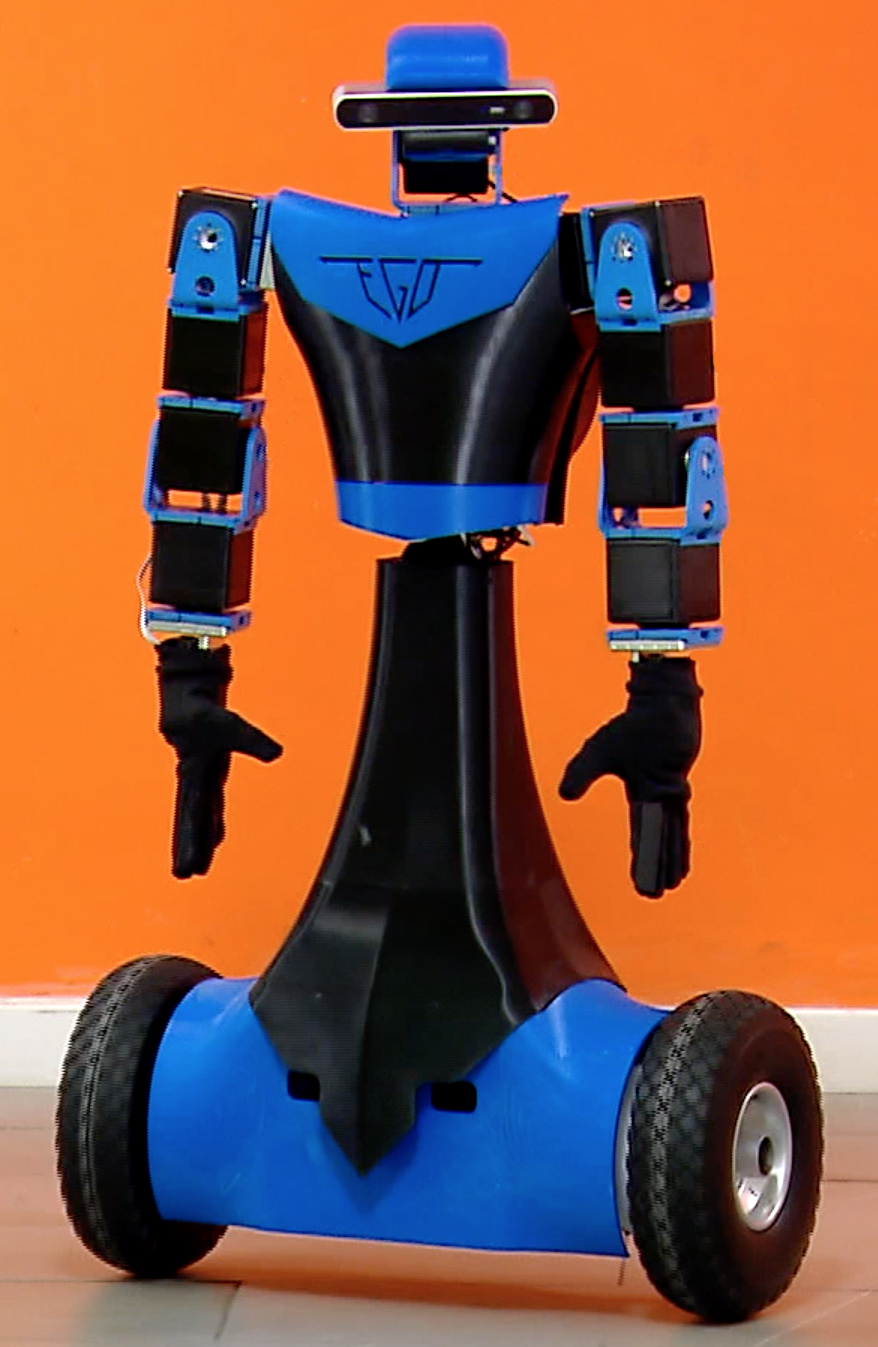
EGO, a soft humanoid robot for physical interaction. The robot has a soft articulated structure equipped with 12 variable stiffness actuators (VSA-Cube) and two under actuated soft robotic hands (Pisa/IIT SoftHands) - Centro di Ricerca "Enrico Piaggio", University of Pisa

== Related European Projects and Initiatives ==
- SOMA (Soft Manipulation)
- SOFTPRO (Synergy-based Open-source Foundations and Technologies for Prosthetics and Rehabilitation)
- SOFTHANDS
- Natural Natural Machine Motion Initiative (NMMI)
- SAPHARI (Safe and Autonomous Physical Human-Aware Robot Interaction)
- VIACTORS (Variable Impedance Actuation systems embodying advanced interaction behaviors)
- ROBLOG (Cognitive Robot for Automation of Logistic Processes)
- THE (The Hand Embodied)
- PHRIENDS (Physical Human-Robot Interaction, dependability and safety)
- STIFF (Enhancing biomorphic agility through variable stiffness)

== See also ==
- Continuum soft robotics
- Collaborative Robotics
- Human-Robot Interaction
- Humanoid robots
- Autonomous robots
- Personal robot
