= Spring scale =

Mechanism to measure force based on the extension of a spring

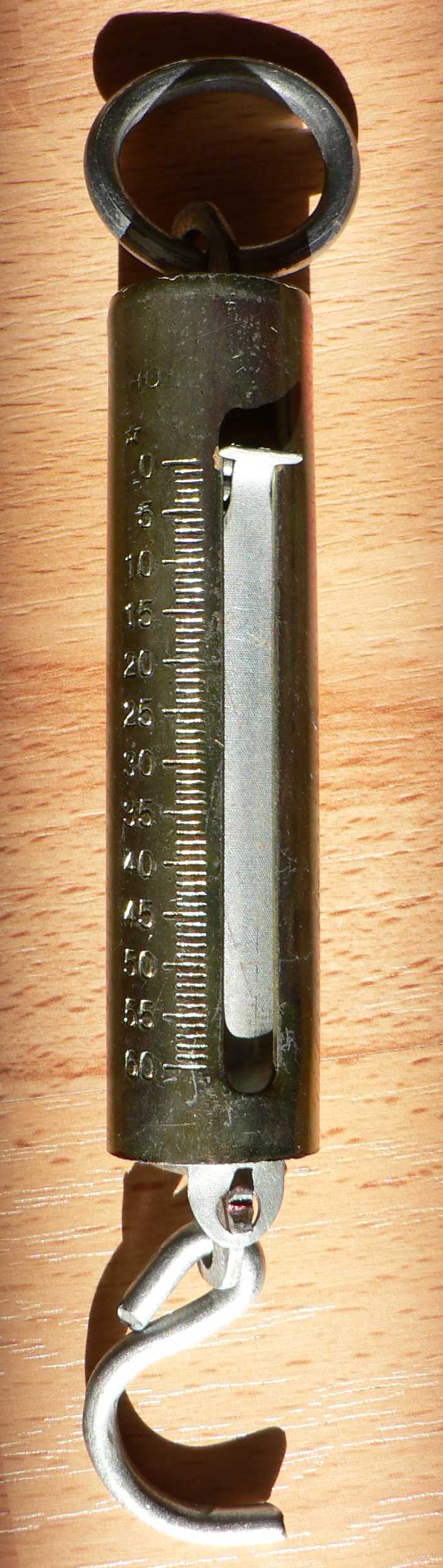
A spring scale

A spring scale, also known as a spring balance or newton meter, is a type of mechanical force gauge or weighing scale. It consists of a spring fixed at one end with a hook to attach an object at the other. It works in accordance with Hooke's law, which states that the force needed to extend or compress a spring by some distance scales linearly with respect to that distance. Therefore, the scale markings on the spring balance are equally spaced.

A spring balance can be calibrated for the accurate measurement of mass in the location in which they are used, but many spring balances are marked right on their face "Not Legal for Trade" or words of similar import due to the approximate nature of the theory used to mark the scale. Also, the spring in the scale can permanently stretch with repeated use.

A spring scale will only read correctly in a frame of reference where the acceleration along the spring axis is constant (such as on earth, where the acceleration is due to gravity). This can be shown by taking a spring scale into an elevator, where the weight measured will change as the elevator moves up and down changing velocities.

If two or more spring balances are hung one below the other in series, each of the scales will read approximately the same, with the full weight of the body hung on the lowest scale. The scale on top would read slightly more due to also supporting the proper weight of the lower scales.

Spring balances come in different sizes. Generally, small scales that measure newtons will have a less firm spring (one with a smaller spring constant) than larger ones that measure tens, hundreds or thousands of newtons or even more depending on the scale of newtons used. The largest spring scale ranged in measurement from 5000 to 8000 newtons.

A spring balance may be labeled in units of force (poundals, Newtons) or mass (pounds, kilograms/grams). Strictly speaking, only the force values can be correctly labeled. In order to infer that the labeled mass values are correct, an object must be hung from the spring balance at rest in an inertial reference frame, interacting with no other objects but the scale itself.

== Uses ==
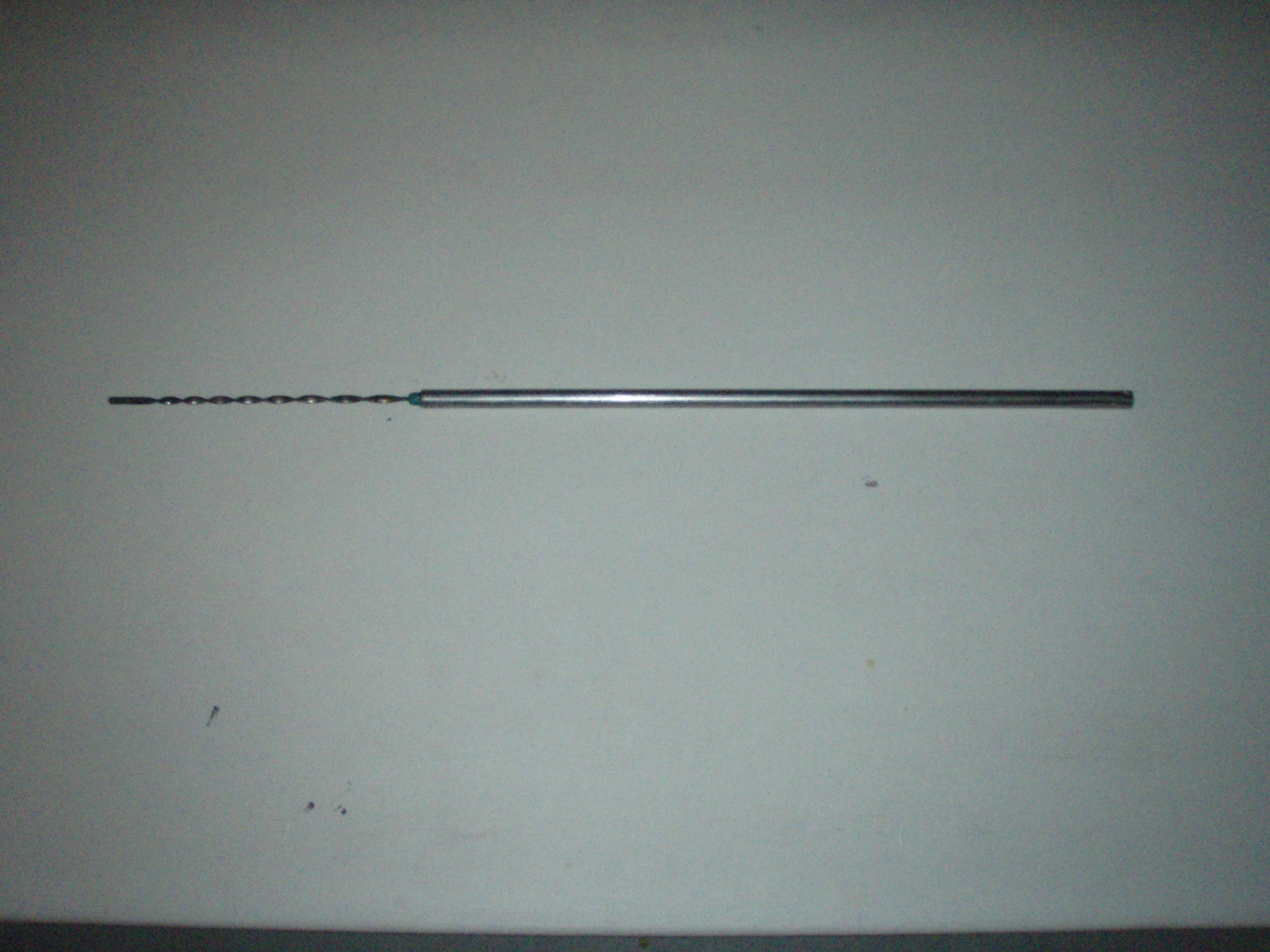
Example of spiral balancer for a sash window

Main uses of spring balances are to weigh heavy loads such as trucks, storage silos, and material carried on a conveyor belt. They are also common in science education as basic accelerators. They are used when the accuracy afforded by other types of scales can be sacrificed for simplicity, cheapness, and robustness.

A spring balance measures the weight of an object by opposing the force of gravity acting with the force of an extended spring.

== History ==
The first spring balance in Britain was made around 1770 by Richard Salter of Bilston, near Wolverhampton. He and his nephews John & George founded the firm of George Salter & Co., still notable makers of scales and balances, who in 1838 patented the spring balance. They also applied the same spring balance principle to steam locomotive safety valves, replacing the earlier deadweight valves.

== See also ==
- Weighing scale
