= Force gauge =

Instrument for measuring force

A force gauge, also known as a push-pull gauge. Manufactured by Nidec.

A force gauge (also called a force meter) is a measuring instrument used to measure forces. Applications exist in research and development, laboratory, quality, production and field environment. There are two kinds of force gauges today: mechanical and digital force gauges. Force Gauges usually measure pressure in stress increments and other dependent human factors.

== Mechanical force gauges ==
A common mechanical force scale, known as the spring scale, features a hook and a spring that attach to an object and measure the amount of force exerted on the spring in order to extend it.

== Electrical gauge ==
An example of an electrical force gauge is an "electronic scale".

One or more electrical load cells (commonly referred to as "weigh bars") are used to support a vertical or horizontal "live load" and are solid-state potentiometers which have variable internal resistance proportional to the load they are subjected to and deflected by. As the load and deflection increase, the internal current path circuit which the "supply voltage" from the "scale head" control/display unit must travel increases in length and resistance. At "no load" the resistance and resulting voltage drop are near "zero" and the "signal voltage" returning from the cell to the "scale head" is at or near "supply voltage" sent to it. As load is added and deflection increases, the internal conductor is "stretched" creating a longer, thinner current path with increasing internal resistance. The "signal voltage" is reduced as a result and the "scale head" - whether "analog" or "digital" - will show the increase in load as an increase in weight. Multiple weigh bars are always required and can be used "between" a load and a "cart" under it to make a "portable scale" or the bars can be used as actual "axles" to support a wheeled or tracked cargo wagon/trailer/cart as well as to measure "tongue weight" so even if part of the load is supported by a "tow vehicle" an accurate measurement and record of cargo loaded onto and/or off of the "mobile scale" is possible.

The same type of "weigh bar" can be used to measure horizontal loads and "drawbar pull" of wheeled/tracked or vehicles or "bollard pull" of boats or the "thrust" of jet engines when a proper "test rig" is designed and constructed to provide "frictionless" fore-aft movement of the load relative to the weigh bars.

So-called "strain gauges" which are also electrical "load cells" but which have internal mechanical components and/or combine the "scale head" and/or "power supply" into one unit and permit the use of relatively common, inexpensive and easily "serviced" vertical weigh bars and in a horizontal load situation in a "compact" and "cheap" alternative to the "frictionless" multi-cell custom-made "test rig" as well as those used in/on modern crane "lift computers" are often used as and referred to as "load cells" when in fact in every case the actual "load cell" is in and of itself "useless" without a "scale head" and properly engineered, designed and constructed "test rig" which allows it to convert "live loads" and a supply or "reference" voltage to varying output signal voltages as its "strained".

Load cells do NOT internally "generate" or otherwise "create" electrical "signals" are no "piezo-electric" devices and do not do anything but deflect and create varying voltage "signals" based upon electrical current supplied to them whether by a "display" or the scale head in actual operation or an analog volt-ohmmeter or digital multimeter when "bench tested" or otherwised demonstrated "operating" but not "in operation".

== See also ==
- Drawbar force gauge
- Dynamometer
- Stretch sensor
- Weighing scale
