= Magnetic slime robot =

Soft Robotic Magnetic Slime

The (left) magnetic slime robot inside a model of a stomach, (right) the robot by itself.

A magnetic slime robot is a self-healing soft robot made up of polyvinyl alcohol, borax and neodymium magnet particles. It was co-created by professor Li Zhang of Chinese University of Hong Kong. It is a non-Newtonian fluid that behaves like a liquid or solid depending on force, having "visco-elastic properties". The robot is developed by and could be deployed inside the human body to perform tasks such as retrieving objects out of it. Contrary to its name, it currently does not have a robot in it, and is only controlled by magnets. It can reach speeds of 30 millimeters per second.

== Properties ==
Magnetic slime robot is in the form of a blob of slime. It is said to be able to make C and O shapes with its body, and these robots could navigate passages as small as 1.5 millimeters. Its self-healing properties make it able to connect with other separate parts of itself to make a whole. It is made of neodymium magnet particles, which make the slime magnetic, and allow the slime to stretch when being attracted to metal.

== Hypothetical uses ==
It is believed that this kind of magnetic robot could extract unhealthy objects ingested by humans, and possibly traverse out of the body with the ingested object with it, and scientists state that the slime is capable of “transporting harmful things”. The robot could be used to be deployed into the human body to retrieve objects that were possibly accidentally ingested. Zhang states that the slime can prevent toxic electrolytes from leaking out by performing encapsulation, and create a kind of coating around the object that is leaking. It can go inside of a child's body.

Despite the possible health benefits this "robot" can provide, it is currently toxic to ingest for humans, and will leak out toxic neodymium particles into the body. Researchers coated the slime robot in silicon dioxide to make a protective layer in the belief that it will prevent the slime from having neodymium leak into human insides. Zhang states that the safety of the slime being in the human body is dependent on the time it stays inside.

=== Electrical ===
The magnetic slime robot is shown and told to be able to conduct electricity, and to pull wires together. Scientists state that the robotic slime is capable of “circuit switching and repair,”.
