= Soft Growing Robotics =

Soft Growing Robotics is a subset of soft robotics concerned with designing and building robots that use robot body expansion to move and interact with the environment.

Soft growing robots are built from compliant materials and attempt to mimic how vines, plant shoots, and other organisms reach new locations through growth. While other forms of robots use locomotion to achieve their objectives, soft growing robots elongate their body through addition of new material, or expansion of material. This gives them the ability to travel through constricted areas and form a wide range of useful 3-D formations. Currently there are two main soft growing robot designs: additive manufacturing and tip extension. Some goals of soft growing robotics development are the creation of robots that can explore constricted areas and improve surgical procedures.

== Additive manufacturing design ==
One way of extending the robot body is through additive manufacturing. Additive manufacturing generally refers to 3-D printing, or the fabrication of three dimensional objects through the conjoining of many layers of material. Additive manufacturing design of a soft growing robot utilizes a modified 3-D printer at the tip of the robot to deposit thermoplastics (material that is rigid when cooled and flexible when heated) to extend the robot in the desired orientation.

=== Design characteristics ===
The body of the robot consists of:

1. A base, where the power supply, circuit board, and spool of thermoplastic filament is stored.
2. The tubular body of varying length created by additive manufacturing which extends outwards from the base.
3. The tip where new material is deposited to lengthen the tubular body, and house sensors.

The additive manufacturing process involves polylactic acid filament (a thermoplastic) being pulled through the tubular body of the robot by a motor in the tip. At the tip, the filament passes through a heating element, making it pliable. The filament is then turned perpendicular to the direction of robot growth and deposited onto the outer edge of a rotating disk facing the base of the robot. As the disk (known as the deposition head) rotates, new filament is deposited in spiraling layers. This filament solidifies in front of the previous layer of filament, pushing the tip of the robot forward. The interactions between the temperature of the heating element, the rotation of the deposition head, and the speed the filament is fed through the heating element is precisely controlled to ensure the robot grows in the desired manner.

=== Movement control ===
The speed of the robot is controlled by changing the temperature of the heating element, the speed at which filament is fed through the heating element, and the speed the deposition head is spun. Speed can be defined as the function:

$S=\frac{L_d}{\sqrt{\frac{1}{(\tan\alpha)^2}+1}}$

Where $L_d$ is the thickness of the deposited layer of filament, and $\alpha$ is the angle of the helix in which the filament material is deposited.

Controlling the direction of growth (and thus the direction of robot "movement") can be done in two ways:

1. Changing the thickness of the filament deposited on one side of the deposition head (tilting the tip away from that side).
2. Changing the number of layers of filament on one side of the deposition head by using partial rotation of the deposition disk to add extra material in that sector (tilting the tip away from the side with extra layers of filament). For example, the disk could normally rotate clockwise, rotate counter-clockwise for 1 radian, and then resume rotating clockwise. This would add two extra layers of material in the 1 radian section.

=== Capabilities ===
One of the major advantages of soft growing robots is that minimal friction exists between the outside environment and the robot. This is because only the robot tip moves relative to the environment. Multiple robots using additive manufacturing for growth were designed for burrowing into the soil, as less friction with the environment reduces energy required to move through the environment.

- Unsubmerged, one robot was able to grow at a speed of 1.8–4 mm/min. with a maximum bending speed of 1.28 degrees per minute and a growing force of up to 6 kg.
- Unsubmerged, a second prototype was able to grow at a speed of 3–4 mm/min. as well as passively turn 40 degrees with a 100% success rate and 50 degrees with a 60% success rate (where passively turning means the robot was grown into a slanted wall and the properties of the thermoplastic filament used to bend the robot in the desired direction).

== Tip extension design ==
A second form of soft growing robot design is tip extension. This design is characterized by a tube of material (common materials include nylon fabric, low density polyethylene, and silicone coated nylon) pressurized with air or water that is folded into itself. By letting out the folded material, the robot extends from the tip as the pressurized tube pushes out the inner folded material.

=== Design characteristics ===
In contrast with additive manufacturing where new material is deposited behind the tip of the robot to push the tip forward, tip extension utilizes the internal pressure within the robot body to push out new material at the tip of the robot. Often, the tubing inside the robot body is stored on a reel to make it easier to control the release of tubing and thus robot growth.

Multiple methods of turning a tip extension robot have been developed. They include:

1. Pinching the inner tube of robot body material and securing the pinched material with latches. To turn the robot, a latch is opened, releasing more robot body material on one side of the robot. The internal pressure causes the extra material to inflate, making one side of the robot longer than the other, and turning the robot away from the longer side. To grow the robot straight, none of the latches are released or all of the latches are released. The latches are controlled through their placement in a second set of inflatable tubing attached to the main robot body material.
  - If a latch's tubing is uninflated, the latch can never open because the internal robot body pressure forces it closed.
  - If a latch's tubing is inflated, and the latch is on a straight section of the robot body, the latch will not open due to the slant of the latch's angled, interlocking hooks.
  - If a latch's tubing is inflated, and the latch is on the tip of the robot, the curve of the tip allows the interlocking hooks to slip past each other and open the latch.
2. Adding a second set of inflatable tubing to the sides of the robot body. This tubing is pinched periodically along its length so that when inflated, the tubing will contract lengthwise. To turn the robot, one set of tubing is inflated, causing the tubing to contract along the length of robot body and turn the robot body in the direction of the inflated tubing.

Robots utilizing the tip extension design are retractable. Current designs use a wire attached to the tip of the robot that is used to pull the tip of the robot back into the robot body.

=== Mathematical analysis ===
The theoretical force the tip grows under can be modelled as:

$F_{driving}=PA$

Where $F_{driving}$ represents the force the tip grows under, $P$ represents internal pressure, and $A$ represents cross sectional area of the robot tip. However, the experimental force the tip expands under has been found to be less than this largely due to axial tension in the robot body. A model that approximates $F_{driving}$ more accurately is:

$F_{driving}=PAk-[YA+F_v]-[F_l+\Sigma_iF_{Ci}]$

Here, $k$ is an experimentally determined constant and $Y$ is yield pressure when no growth occurs. $F_v$, $F_l$, and $F_{Ci}$, are force terms dependent on velocity, length, and curvature or the robot respectively.

Additionally, multiple mathematical models for various forms of turning, twisting, and retracting have been developed.

== Methods of robot operation ==
Soft growing robots can be controlled in various ways depending on how well the objective and growth path are defined. Without a clearly defined goal or robot growth path, teleoperation is used. When a clearly defined goal exists (such as a light source), computer vision can be used to find a path to the goal and grow a robot along that path. If the desired path of robot growth is known before the robot is deployed, pre-planned turning positions can be used to control the robot.

- Teleoperation: a human operator controls robot growth, speed, and turning. This can be done either with the operator viewing the robot, or with the operator using an onboard camera.
- Computer vision: using a camera and software to detect a pre-defined goal and steer the robot towards the goal autonomously.
- Pre-determined turning positions: With the latch turning design, the latches can be made so they open at pre-planned times, making the robot grow in pre-planned shapes.

== Applications ==
Possible applications of soft growing robots focus on their low friction/interaction with the environment, their simple method of growth, and their ability to grow through cramped environments.

- Coral reef exploration:
  - Soft growing robots potentially have the ability to grow within the passageways of the reefs, with sensors (optical, distance, etc.) without damaging the reef.
- As the support structure for an antenna:
  - A soft growing robot can grow into a helix configuration with an antenna attached to it, which is an optimal configuration for the operation of the antenna.
- Surgical Procedures:
  - Minimally invasive surgery involves medical procedures within sensitive, constricted environments (the human body) which could be well suited to the flexibility and controllability of soft growing robots.
- Burrowing into the ground:
  - As friction is only experienced by the tip of the soft growing robot body when digging, soft growing robots may be more energy efficient than other methods of digging that involve the entire robot body moving relative to the environment.
