= Stretch sensor =

Sensor measuring deformation and stretching

A stretch sensor is a sensor which can be used to measure deformation and stretching forces such as tension or bending. They are usually made from a material that is itself soft and stretchable.

Most stretch sensors fall into one of three categories. The first type consists of an electrical conductor for which the electrical resistance changes (usually increases) substantially when the sensor is deformed.

The second type consists of a capacitor for which the capacitance changes under deformation. Known properties of the sensor can then be used to deduce the deformation from the resistance/capacitance. Both the rheostatic and capacitive types often take the form of a cord, tape, or mesh.

The third type of sensor uses high performance piezoelectric systems in soft, flexible/stretchable formats for measuring signals using the capability of piezoelectric materials to interconvert mechanical and electrical forms of energy.

== Applications ==
Wearable stretch sensors can be used for tasks such as measuring body posture or movement. in 2018, New Zealand based company StretchSense began making a motion capture glove (data glove) using stretch sensors. Unlike gloves that use inertial or optical sensors, stretchable sensors do not suffer from drift or occlusion.

They can also be used in robotics, particularly in soft robots.

Stretch sensors are now widely used in medical fields for analysis and measuring the human dielectric properties w.r.t skin.

== See also ==
- Flexible electronics
- Force gauge
- Thermistor
- Stretchable electronics
- Stretch receptor
