= Arachnid locomotion =

Arachnid locomotion is the various means by which arachnids walk, run, or jump; they make use of more than muscle contraction, employing additional methods like hydraulic compression. Another adaptation seen especially in larger arachnid variants is inclusion of elastic connective tissues.

== Hydraulics ==
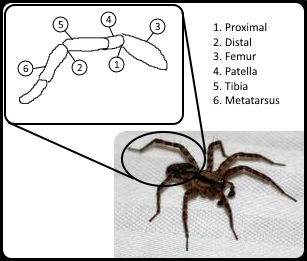
Segments of the legs of a spider.

In most arachnids, hydraulic compression acts as the primary means of extension in several of their hinged leg joints, namely the femur–patella joint and tibia–metatarsus joints or second and third leg joints respectively. Instead of blood, hemolymph is used to move nutrients around inside of the arachnid, and has the secondary function of acting as a hydraulic fluid. When compressed by the body of the arachnid, the hemolymph applies compressive force through channels in the limbs that cause them to extend. This motion is then balanced by flexor muscle to retract the leg joints as needed. Due to hydraulics being used for extension, the flexor muscle is able to be significantly larger than would otherwise be possible without impacting size or weight. Measurable core body volume change can occur during periods of higher compression to the legs, as the sinuses of the body contract to achieve pressurization in specific legs. Aside from the normal gait of the arachnid, in some variants, extremely high pressures are used as a means of jumping, propelling rear legs and allowing for much greater and more sudden motion.

== Elastics ==
In larger variants of arachnids, such as the tarantulas and hairy desert spiders, another mechanism used for locomotion is an elastic sclerite. These sclerites are semi-rigid connectors between leg segments that allow storage and expending of potential energy. This is used as a supplement or in conjunction with the hydraulics normally employed in those joints, allowing for greater weights to be carried, more rapid and sudden movement when combined with the already pronounced flexor muscle acting in those joints, as well as fine motor control with reduced sudden disruption of hemolymph flow. At higher compression of the joint the stiffness of the sclerite has been found to increase significantly, denoting support even outside of normal tension.

== Influence on biomimetic design ==
Hydraulic locomotion in arachnids has acted as an inspiration for many modern biomimetic concepts in robotics intended for use by or with people, especially in the field of soft robotics. The use of hydraulics in robotic joints is aimed at replacing the more control heavy nature of modern robotics with a more passive system developed in soft actuation. Various forms of actuation and force transmission can be achieved through these inspired designs, including rotation, lifting, and even damping effects. The passive nature of the hydraulic and elastic extensor mechanisms employed have found use in orthotics projects aimed at assisting joints weakened by age or disease.

== Fluid secretion ==
An additional method used by some arachnids to improve locomotion is to secrete fluids, characterized by a hydrophobic effect, through the pads on the ends of their legs that are in contact with the walking surface. It has been shown that the arachnid is capable of using the adhesive fluid selectively, meaning it can choose to not secrete the fluid in certain circumstances where it would be unwarranted such as in moist conditions. The use of fluids allow the arachnid better traction through improved shear force for both standard locomotion and also sudden movements such as in jumping and leaping.

== Challenges in modelling ==
Modelling the hydraulic system used by arachnids has been a challenge in the past due to scale and complexity. Simplified models focusing on individual joints and flow channels using modern imaging such as Micro-CT has allowed for mathematical expressions of pressure and flow acting on the joints. Visualizing the flow of hemolymph in small bodies directly has been difficult due to resolution constraints and lack of contrast causing fluid and soft tissue being indistinguishable, but techniques have been employed using a combination of injected microbubbles as tracers in the hemolymph and synchrotron x-ray contrast imaging to track them.

== See also ==
- Arachnid
