= Robotic arm =

Type of mechanical arm with similar functions to a human arm

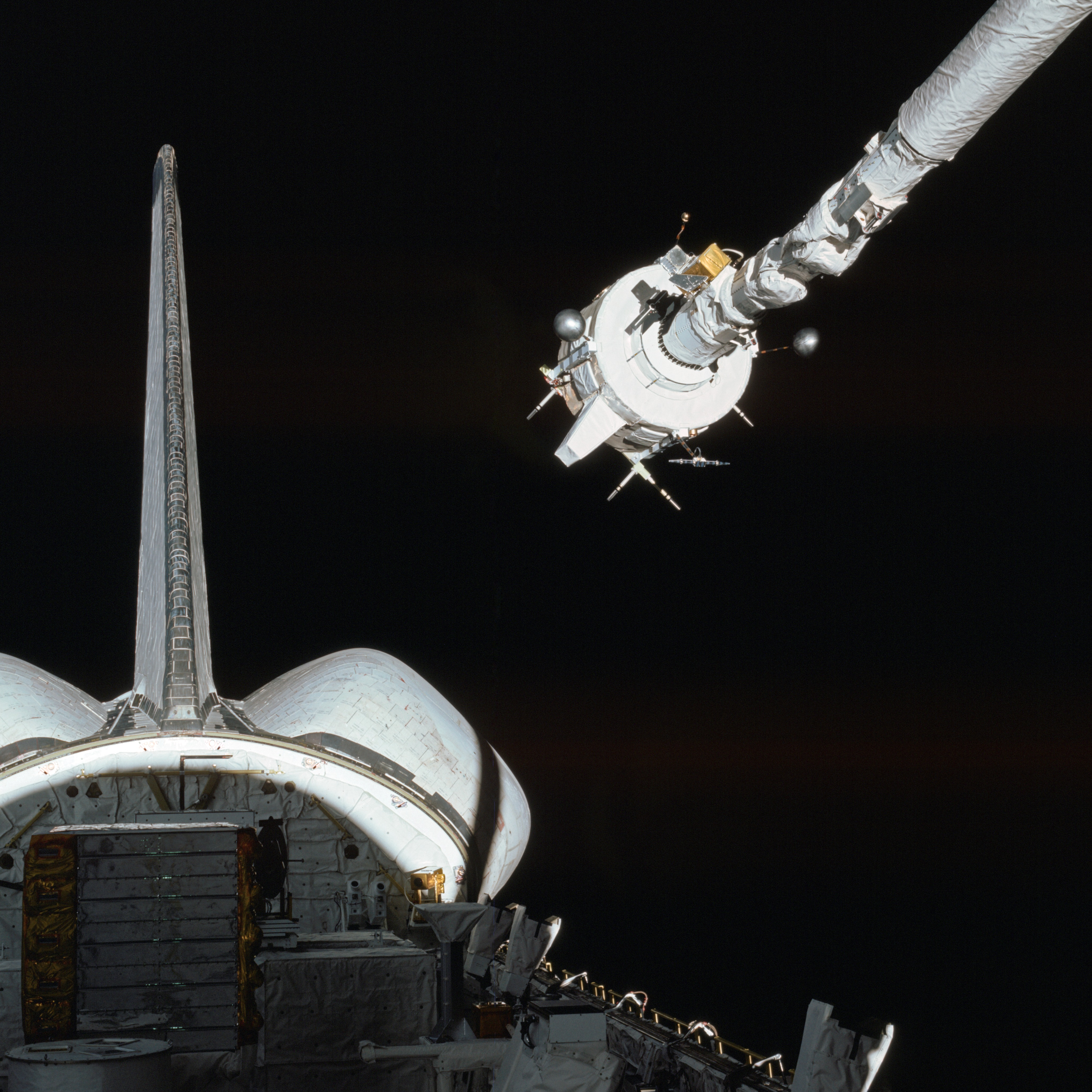
The Canadarm while deploying a payload from the cargo bay of the Space Shuttle

A robotic arm is a type of mechanical arm, usually programmable, with similar functions to a human arm; the arm may be the sum total of the mechanism or may be part of a more complex robot. The links of such a manipulator are connected by joints allowing either rotational motion (such as in an articulated robot) or translational (linear) displacement.

The links of the manipulator can be considered to form a kinematic chain. The terminus of the kinematic chain of the manipulator is called the end effector and it is analogous to the human hand.

== Classification ==
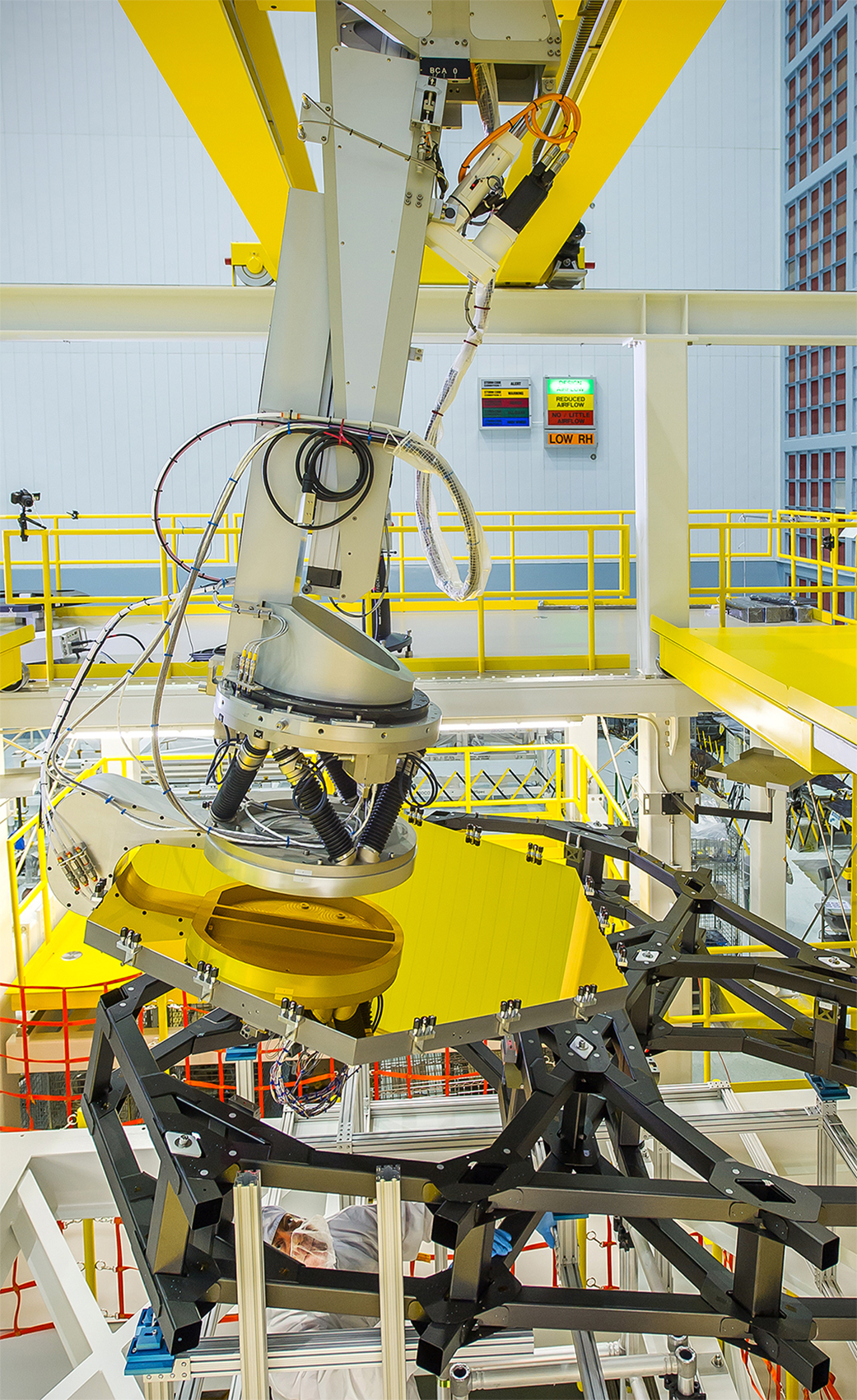
Robotic arm installs primary mirror segments of the James Webb Space Telescope.

A serial robot arm can be described as a chain of links that are moved by joints which are actuated by motors. An end-effector, also called a robot hand, can be attached to the end of the chain. As other robotic mechanisms, robot arms are typically classified in terms of the number of degrees of freedom (DOF). Usually, the number of DOF is equal to the number of joints that move the links of the robot arm. At least six DOF are required to enable the robot hand to reach an arbitrary pose (position and orientation) in three dimensional space.

Additional DOF allow to change the configuration of some link on the arm (e.g., elbow up/down), while keeping the robot hand in the same pose. Inverse kinematics is the mathematical process to calculate the configuration of an arm, typically in terms of joint angles, given a desired pose of the robot hand in three-dimensional space.

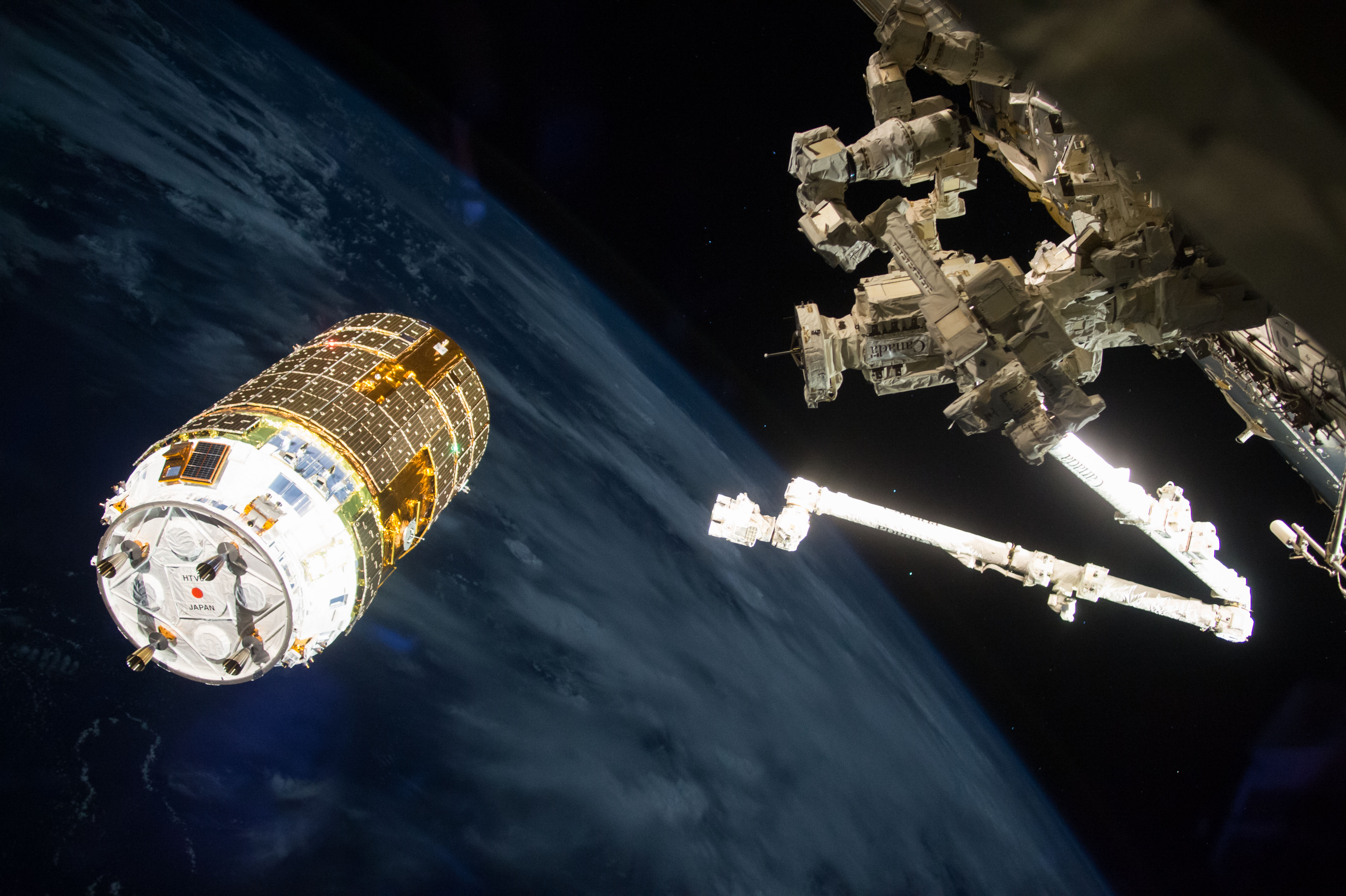
The Canadarm reaches for a space resupply spacecraft in Earth orbit.

== Types ==
- Articulated robot: Used for assembly operations, diecasting, fettling machines, gas welding, arc welding and spray-painting. It is a robot whose arm has at least three rotary joints.
- Cartesian robot / Gantry robot: Used for pick and place work, application of sealant, assembly operations, handling machine tools and arc welding. It is a robot whose arm has three prismatic joints, whose axes are coincident with a Cartesian coordinator.
- Cylindrical robot: Used for assembly operations, handling at machine tools, spot welding, and handling at die casting machines. It is a robot whose axes form a cylindrical coordinate system.
- Humanoid robot: It is shaped anthropomorphically, i.e. with independent fingers and thumbs.
- Parallel robot: One use is a mobile platform handling cockpit flight simulators. It is a robot whose arms have concurrent prismatic or rotary joints.
- SCARA robot: Used for pick and place work, application of sealant, assembly operations and handling machine tools. This robot features two parallel rotary joints to provide compliance in a plane.
- Spherical robot / Polar robot: Used for handling machine tools, spot welding, die casting, fettling machines, gas welding and arc welding. It is a robot whose axes form a polar coordinate system.

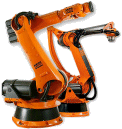
6 Axis Articulated Robots from KUKA

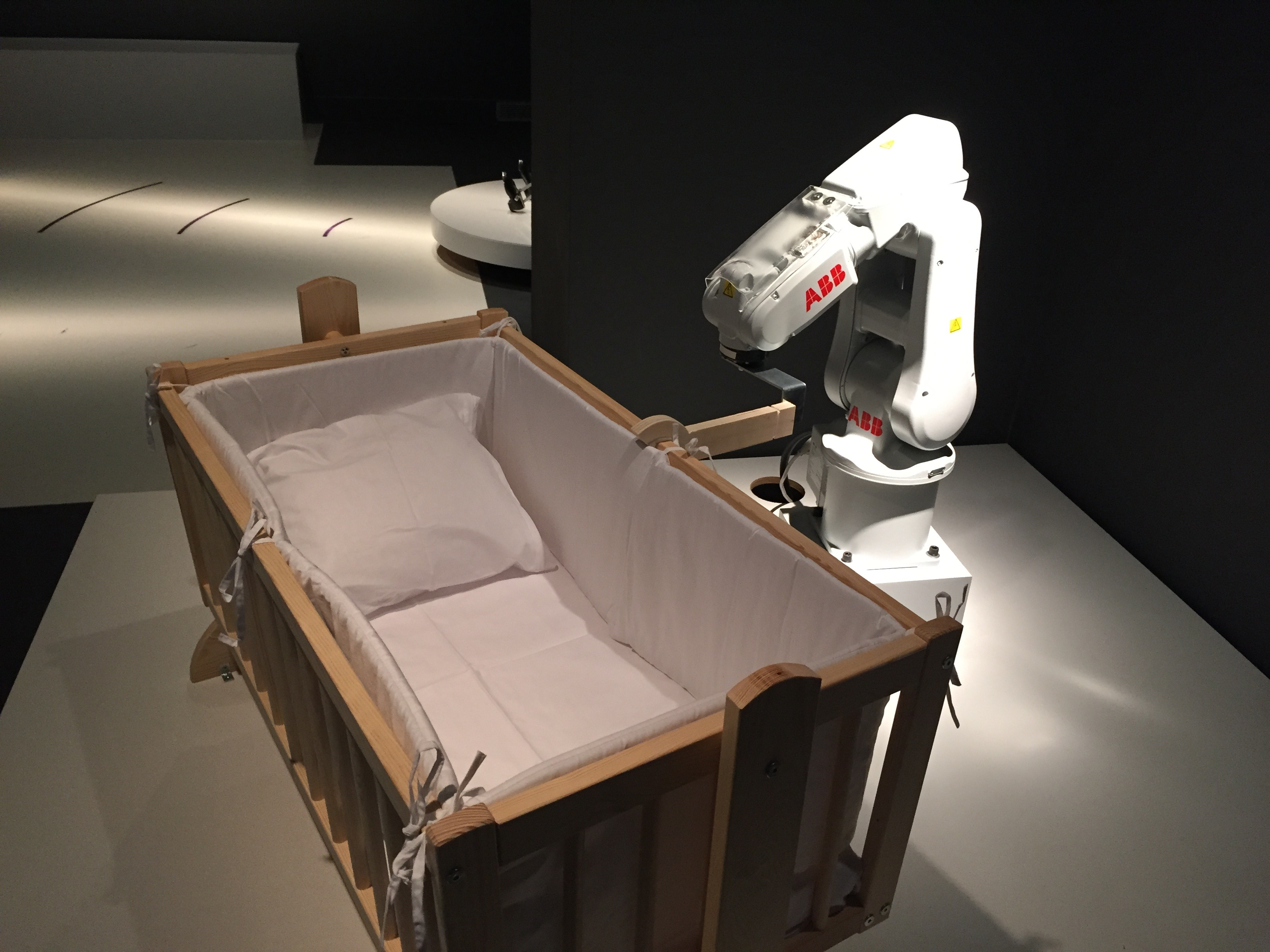
Humans+ exhibit

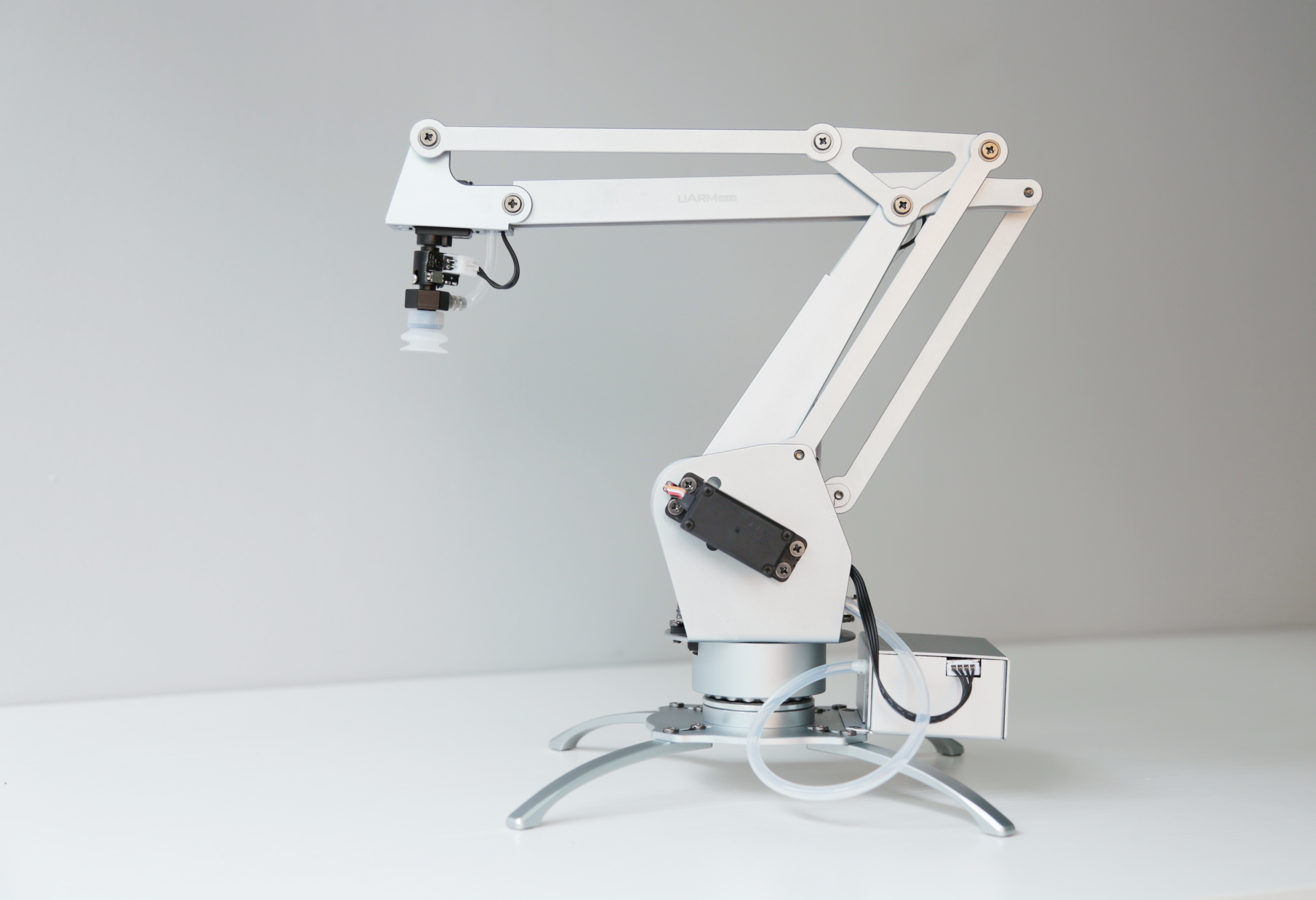
uArm Metal Commercial Robot Arm

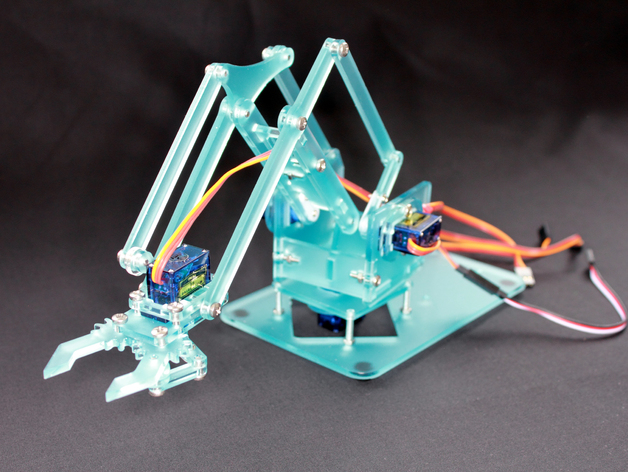
MeArm Open-source robotics Arm

== Notable robotic arms ==
Four notable manufacturers of robotic arms include FANUC, ABB, Yaskawa, and KUKA.

FANUC was established in Japan in 1972. As of 2023, it has shipped over 1 million robots. In 2022, VW Group purchased 1,300 FANUC arms for automobile production. Additionally, FANUC announced in 2025 that it had sold 50 more robots for car painting. In November 2025, FANUC unveiled a new robot arm aimed to target food handling and cleaning applications.

ABB was established in Switzerland in 1988. In October 2025, ABB announced that its industrial robotics division was sold to the Japanese conglomerate SoftBank for USD5.4 billion. In May 2025, ABB showed off a collaboration with California restaurant Burgerbots. The arms were capable of assembling customized burgers in under 30 seconds.

Yaskawa was established in Japan in 1915 and started developing the MOTO arm series in the 1960’s. Their first robot arm, the Motoman-L10, started production in 1977. In 2021, Yaskawa announced that over 500,000 Motoman robots had been sold. Yaskawa Europe has partnered with the Netherlands-based vision AI company Fizyr to create industrial robot arms, with ventures in automotive manufacturing and dishwashing.

KUKA was established in Germany in 1898 and began industrial robot development in 1971. In 1973, KUKA introduced FAMULUS, the first electric six-axis robot arm. In 2008, KUKA released the KR 1000 Titan, which was the first robot arm capable of lifting 1000 kilograms. Since at least 2014, Tesla automotive factories have used KUKA arms to manufacture products like the Model X, the Model 3, and the Cybertruck.

In space, the Canadarm and its successor Canadarm2 are examples of multi-DOF robotic arms. These robotic arms have been used to perform a variety of tasks such as inspection of the Space Shuttle using a specially deployed boom with cameras and sensors attached at the end effector, and also satellite deployment and retrieval manoeuvres from the cargo bay of the Space Shuttle.

The Curiosity and Perseverance rovers on the planet Mars also use robotic arms. Additionally, Perseverance has a smaller sample caching arm hidden inside its body below the rover in its caching assembly.

The European Sample Transfer Arm was developed for the cancelled NASA-ESA Mars Sample Return mission.

TAGSAM is a robotic arm for collecting a sample from a small asteroid in space on the spacecraft OSIRIS-REx.

The 2018 Mars lander InSight has a robotic arm called the IDA, which has a camera, grappler, and is used to move special instruments.

Animation of the InSight lander's seismometer being lifted off the saucer by its robotic arm and placed on the surface of Mars

== Low-cost robotic arms ==
In the 2010s, the availability of low-cost robotic arms increased substantially. Low-cost arms have been marketed as hobby or educational devices and have found use in laboratory automation, like their use as autosamplers. Reductions in cost have been made possible by selling DIY robot arm kits, where consumers purchase servo motor kits from licensed distributors and 3D print the links and other parts from files online. One example of a low-cost arm is the Standard Open Arm from HuggingFace, who released their SO-101 robot arm model in April 2025 with pricing starting as low as USD100.

Open-source robotics arms such as MeArm have further reduced costs and enabled iterative community improvements to designs. In 2024, HuggingFace released LeRobot, an open-source Python library designed for helping in the robot learning process. LeRobot supports the SO-101 and SO-100 models along with other low-cost arms such as the Koch v1.1 arm and the LeKiwi mobile robot.

== Robotic hands ==
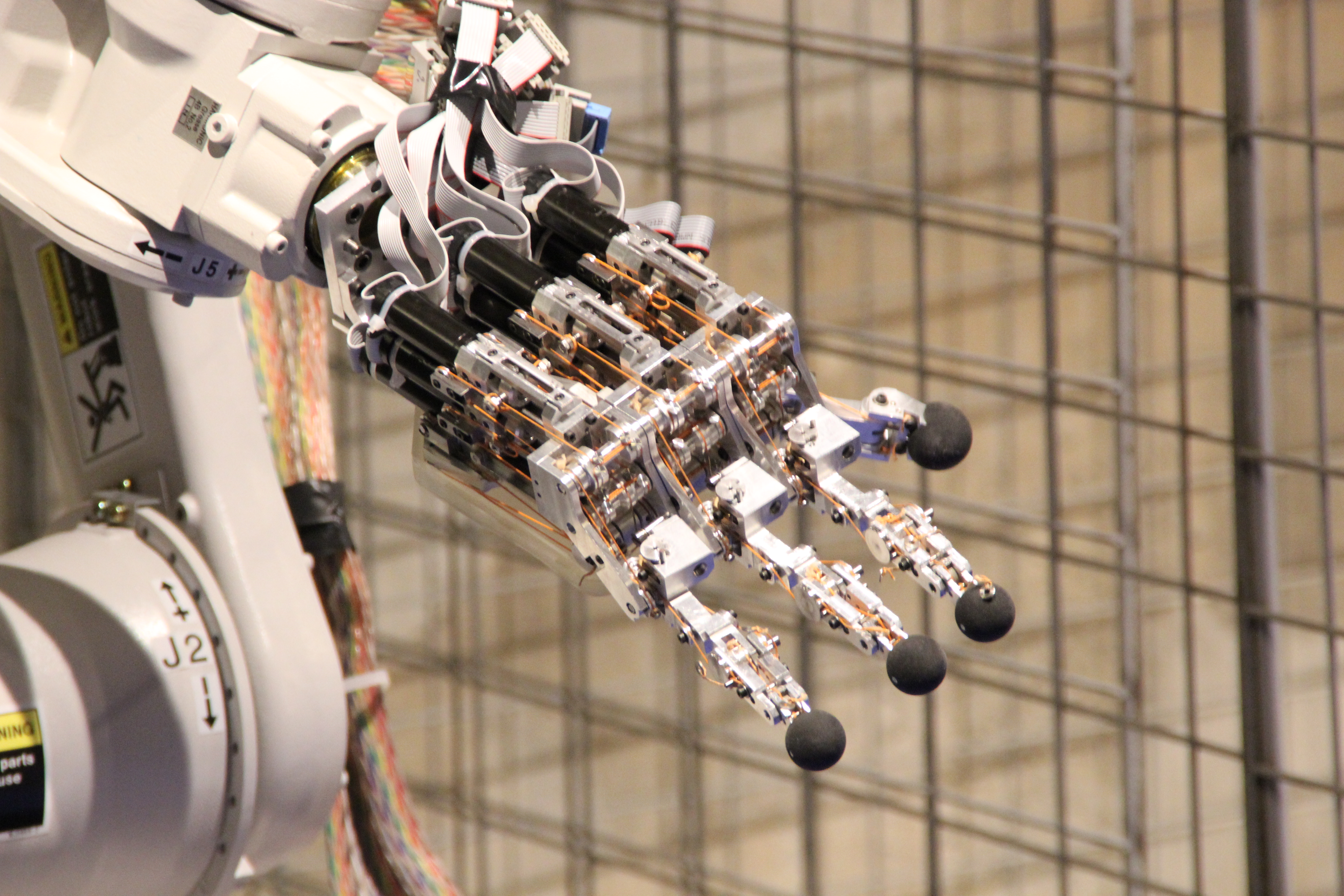
Robotic hand

The end effector, or robotic hand, can be designed to perform any desired task such as welding, gripping, spinning etc., depending on the application. For example, robot arms in automotive assembly lines perform a variety of tasks such as welding and parts rotation and placement during assembly. In some circumstances, close emulation of the human hand is desired, as in robots designed to conduct bomb disarmament and disposal or when performing robot-assisted surgeries.

Teleoperation of robotic arms and hands is a popular way to develop control methods for robot arms. One or more "master" arms are used to control the motion of one or more "slave" or "follower" arms. The operator of the master arm may receive some form of feedback, such as visual or tactile feedback from the interaction of the follower arm and the environment.

In 2026, 1X Technologies demoed the hand of its Neo humanoid robot, which has 25 DOF and closely replicates the capabilities of a human hand.

== Artificial intelligence and machine learning ==
The significance of artificial intelligence and machine learning in robotic arm functioning and control has grown over the past few years. Even in unstructured surroundings, arms can identify and control a variety of items. This is possible because of vision-based AI systems. Motion planning, adaptive grasping, and the ability for robots to learn tasks from human examples are all made possible by machine learning. These features have expedited the usage of robotic arms in medical surgery, autonomous warehouses, and collaborative robots, among other applications.

These AI-powered robotic arms are used more widely in the industrial sectors, logistics, healthcare, and also in the agricultural sectors. They increase productivity, eliminate human error, and do repetitive or precision-intensive activities faster than humans, such as assembling electronics, quality checking, and aiding in surgeries. These intelligent robotic arms automation helps reduce labor shortages and operating expenses across a number of different industries.

The usage of edge computing, which allows robots to interpret sensor data in real time and make choices, is one recent advancement that has improved reaction times in fast-paced sectors. AI and sophisticated sensing are being used by collaborative robots, sometimes known as "cobots," to securely assist people. During joint work, they instinctively modify their motions. Robotic arms are also predicted to grow more autonomous, flexible and adaptive as machine learning and artificial intelligence advance, carrying out an ever widening range of activities in a variety of sectors.

== Machine-learning applications ==
AI-capable robotic arms are increasingly essential in a variety of industries, including manufacturing, shipping, healthcare, and agriculture. These robotic arms are used in manufacturing to do intricate and repetitive jobs with exceptional speed and accuracy, such as welding automotive parts and assembling electronic components. Machine learning algorithms that adapt to minute changes in components enable these jobs, increasing quality and reducing waste. AI-enabled robotic arms help solve manpower shortages and boost operational efficiency in logistics and warehousing by facilitating sorting, packaging, and palletizing with improved speed and precision. Robotic-assisted surgeries are one example of a healthcare application where AI-driven arms increase dexterity and stability, allowing for less invasive treatments and faster recovery. AI-powered manipulators are also used in agricultural robots for precise planting, harvesting, and crop monitoring, maximizing resource efficiency and yield quality.

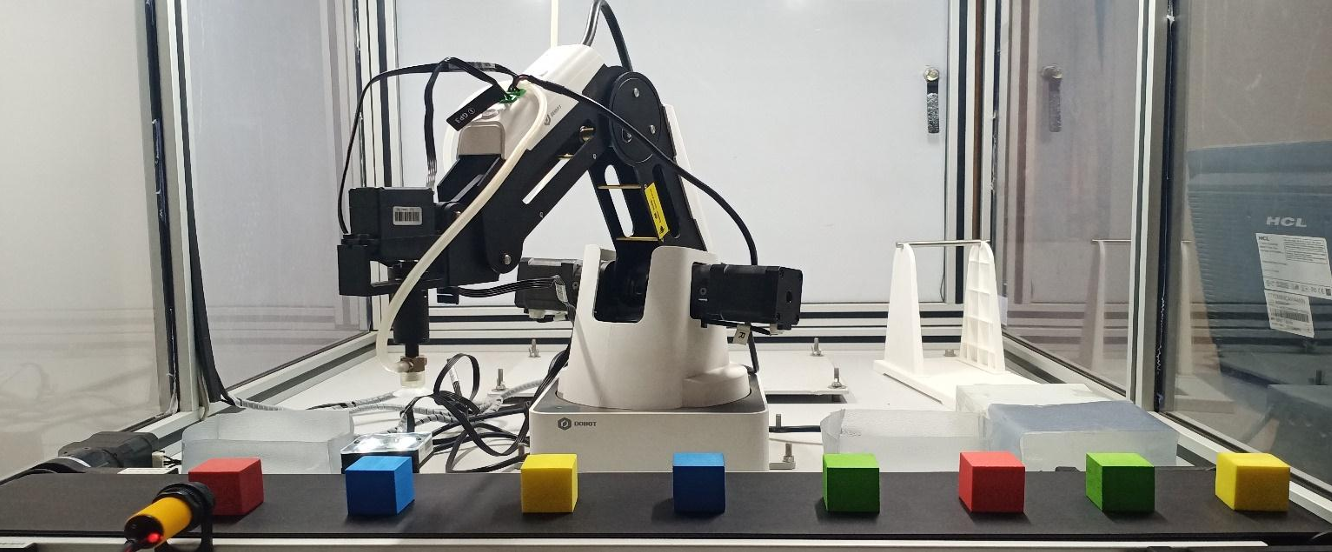
A robot arm used for applications like color sorting, stacking, and laser printing

These robotic arms are further equipped with real-time sensor processing and autonomous decision-making capabilities, made possible by real time data analytics performed directly on robot and integrated AI systems. Collaborative robots, that are outfitted with advanced sensors and artificial intelligence may work securely alongside people, dynamically modifying their actions to improve both productivity and safety. A growing role for robotic arms is indicated by the ongoing development of machine learning models and sensor integration, which gradually increases their autonomy, adaptability, and range of applications in both existing and emergent industries.

== See also ==
- European Robotic Arm
- Offline programming
- Open-hardware robotics
- Prosthetics
- Robotics simulator
- Robotics suite
- Telerobotics
- Working envelope
