= Octobot (robot) =

Concept soft-bodied mechanism

External videos
- Introducing the Octobot from Harvard University

Octobot is a proof of concept soft-bodied autonomous robot. The project team included Harvard University faculty members Robert Wood and Jennifer A. Lewis, along with researchers with backgrounds in mechanical engineering, 3D printing, microfluidics, and robotics. Octobot was described in the journal Nature in 2016.

== Overview ==
Octobot is a 3D-printed autonomous robot shaped like a small octopus, with a soft body made of 3D-printed silicone gel. It uses hydrogen peroxide as its main power source and also contains a microfluidic logic circuit. Octobot is said to be able to move on its own without any aid by a battery or an electrical power source. The hydrogen peroxide flows around a network of 3D printed hollows (or freckles) within the body of the robot. Hydrogen peroxide moves over platinum pieces, which causes a chemical reaction. This chemical reaction causes a gas to form creating the main power source for the robot. This phenomenon produces a reaction that inflates and moves the arms, to propel the robot through water.

== Design influences ==
The 3D printed silicone gel body of Octobot is designed to mimic the body of an octopus, and neither one has an internal skeleton. This material is flexible and sturdy, all while being able to move with ease. The Octobot is designed to mimic the movements of an octopus.

The Octobot itself has also inspired new possibilities for technologies. Some scientists think that this new technology could pave the way for advancements in the medical field. The discussion of possibly changing the material that these soft-bodied robots are made from has also surfaced. The Octobot could be made from biodegradable material instead of 3D printed silicone gel, leading to many advancements in environmental awareness. These robots also have the possibility to be used in search and rescue missions, leveraging their ability to be very flexible and possibly squeeze through spaces that humans or current robots may not.
