= IfThenSheCan =

120 3D printed statues in Washington, US

#IfThenSheCan
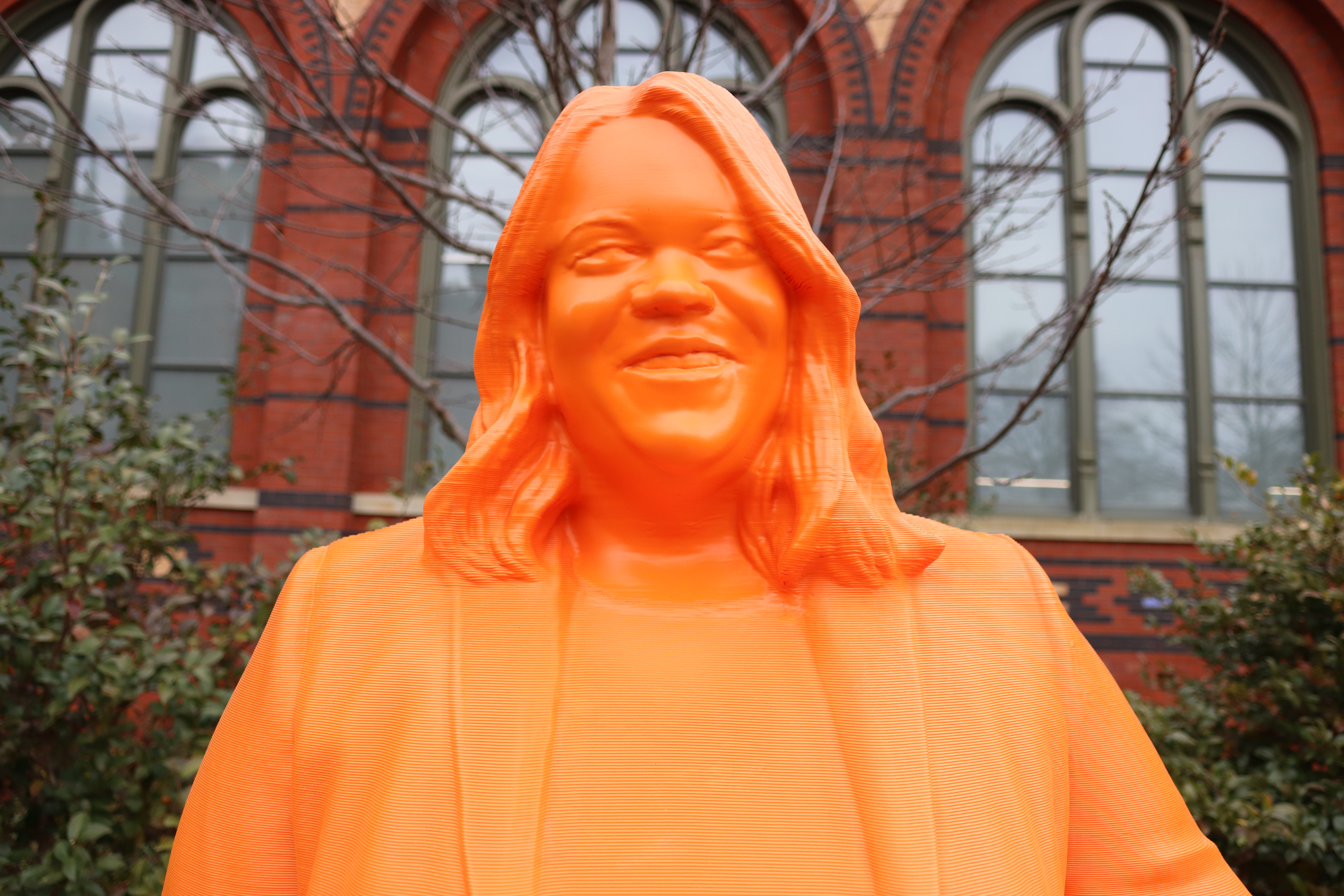
- Year: 2022
- Medium: 3D-printed plastic
- Subject: women in STEM (US scope)
- Location: AIB, the Smithsonian Castle, Enid A. Haupt Garden, National Museum of Natural History, National Air and Space Museum, Washington, D.C.
- Owner: Lyda Hill Philanthropies
- Website: Official website

#IfThenSheCan is a collection of 120 3D-printed orange freestanding 1:1 scale statues of American women in STEM fields. Various subsets of these sculptures have been exhibited across the United States, most prominently at Smithsonian Institution buildings in Washington DC. The exhibition is part of a wider project called #IfThen (also stylised IF/THEN), the name of which takes the form of a hashtag and refers to the project's motto: "if she can see it, then she can be it" (a concept called representation). Taken in the context of computer engineering (part of the E in STEM), an if/then statement controls logic flow.

== Depicted ==
Notable women depicted include:

- Erika Anderson
- Katy Croff Bell
- Deborah Berebichez
- Dana Bolles
- Afua Bruce
- Raychelle Burks
- Olivia Castellini
- Minerva Cordero
- Jess Cramp
- Catie Cuan
- Greetchen Díaz-Muñoz
- Sylvia A. Earle
- Crystal R. Emery
- Jessica Esquivel
- Xyla Foxlin
- Allison Fundis
- Joyonna Gamble-George
- Jaye Gardiner
- Sylvie Garneau-Tsodikova
- Anamita Guha
- Erika T. Hamden
- J'Tia Hart
- Victoria Herrmann
- Vanessa Hill
- Chavonda Jacobs-Young
- Lataisia Jones
- Mitu Khandaker
- Kelly Korreck
- Kellyn LaCour-Conant
- Corinna E. Lathan
- Kristen Lear
- Janis Louie
- Shirley M. Malcom
- Earyn McGee
- Harshini Mukundan
- Burçin Mutlu-Pakdil
- Becca Peixotto
- Karina Popovich
- Ana Maria Porras Corredor
- Shyla Raghav
- Kimberly Sass
- Ciara Sivels
- Ahna Skop
- Debbie Sterling
- Helen Tran
- Rae Wynn-Grant
- others

== Exhibition history ==
The initial exhibit ran from March 5 to March 27, 2022.

== See also ==
- 500 Women Scientists
