= Joyonna Gamble-George =

American neuroscientist, researcher and entrepreneur

- Education: Vanderbilt University (Ph.D.); University of South Florida College of Public Health (MHA); Xavier University of Louisiana (B.S.)

Joyonna Gamble-George is an American neuroscientist, innovator, and entrepreneur known for her research with the endocannabinoid system in stress-induced maladaptations of the brain. She is an Adjunct Professor at St. Petersburg College, Florida.

== Education ==
Gamble-George graduated from Eleanor Roosevelt High School of Greenbelt, Maryland with merit from the school's science and technology program. Following graduation, Gamble-George attended Xavier University of Louisiana and joined the Alpha Kappa Alpha sorority. She graduated cum laude with a Bachelor of Science in Biochemistry and Biology/Pre-Medicine and was the only student in her class to graduate with an Honors in Mathematics. She then received a Master of Health Administration from the University of South Florida College of Public Health. Gamble-George continued her education at Vanderbilt University where she earned a Doctor of Philosophy degree in Neuroscience. She completed her postdoctoral training at the University of Florida, where she researched communication in the human brain and animal models of HIV-1 infection.

== Research ==
Gamble-George works in the fields of medical science and biotechnology, and has scientific publications concerning Alzheimer's disease pathology, anxiety and stress-related disorders, neurotoxicity, HIV, and therapeutics. In addition, she has co-authored several publications regarding two distinct fields: the connection between HIV and several chronic diseases (cardiovascular, metabolic, neurologic, and pulmonary), and the treatment of Parkinson's Disease.

Gamble-George's first pre-baccalaureate research experience involved investigating the bonding structure between molybdenum in oxidation state six and amino acid type ligands in an effort to understand how molybdenum's involvement in the development of gout could prevent the disease from spreading. As an undergraduate, she conducted research focused on palmetto and licorice root as a possible treatment for prostate cancer.

At Bay Pines Veterans Affairs Healthcare System, Gamble-George investigated how Raf inhibitors could possibly assist neurological disorders, such as Alzheimer's disease, and as anti-neurodegenerative agents. Thereafter, she became involved in drug addiction research at Meharry Medical College and published research on the effects of methamphetamine on the brain.

Gamble-George's PhD research focused on the endocannabinoid system with regard to anxiety and depression.

At the University of Florida, she investigated the cellular mechanisms involved in drug addiction and HIV-1 infection.

== Career ==
Gamble-George worked at the National Institutes of Health National Heart, Lung, and Blood Institute as a health scientist and AAAS Science & Technology Policy Fellow. She served as an expert science advisor at NIH to advise others with their research on vulnerable populations.

Along with her research, Gamble-George worked as a healthcare administrator and health system specialist where she evaluated daily functions of Central Alabama Veterans Healthcare System. During this time, she performed strategic planning and implementation to improve customer service, Veterans benefits, and patient hospital admission through a program sponsored by the American Hospital Association.

She also co-founded SciX and now serves as a national team member for the company. SciX is a biotech development company aiming to create wearable devices that can predict heart related problems using artificial intelligence.

She is an adjunct professor at St. Petersburg College in Pinellas County, Florida.

== Personal life ==
Gamble-George grew up in rural Alabama on her grandparents' farm, located in an area where access to primary care was often challenging. She has stated that she believes these issues motivated her to pursue a career in healthcare.

== Awards and honors ==
Gamble-George has won awards and honors including the following:

- 2014 – ICRS Monique and George Braude Student Travel Award
- 2014 – Lindau Nobel Laureate Meeting Attendee
- 2018 – Entrepreneur of the Year Awarded by the Small Business Expo
- 2019 – AAAS IF/THEN® Ambassador Program
- 2019 – National Small Business Associations Lewis Shattuck Small Business Advocate of the Year Award Finalist
- 2020 – The 40 under 40 Honoree Awarded by the Tampa Bay Business Journal
- 2020 – Special Recognition Global Award awarded by WomenTech Network
- 2020 – NHLBI Director's Award for Partnership/Collaboration, NIH NHLBI Women's Health Working Group
- 2021 – Nepris Trailblazer Award
