= María Porras =

María Porras may refer to:

- María Consuelo Porras (born 1953), Guatemalan judge
- María Paula Porras (born 2002), Costa Rican footballer
- Ana Maria Porras, American biomedical engineer
- Ana María Porras (born 1991), Costa Rican hurdler
