= Zamanillo =

Zamanillo is a Spanish surname. Notable people with the surname include:

- Jorge Zamanillo (born 1969), American archaeologist, curator, and museum administrator
- José Luis Zamanillo González-Camino (1903–1980), Spanish politician
