= National Museum of the American Latino =

Future museum in Washington, DC

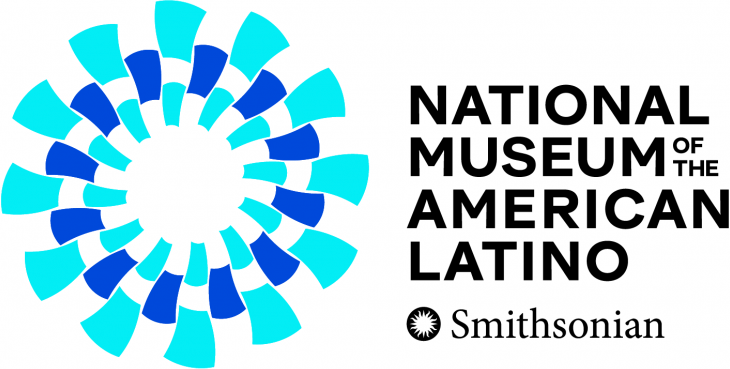
- Established: December 27, 2020
- Type: History museum
- Collections: American Latino history, art, music
- Director: Jorge Zamanillo
- Website: latino.si.edu

The National Museum of the American Latino is a future Smithsonian Institution museum dedicated to highlighting the contributions of American Latinos in U.S. history and culture. The enacting legislation for the museum called for it to be situated in a "signature location on the National Mall" in Washington, D.C., and the Smithsonian chose the preexisting Arts and Industries Building on the National Mall as the site for the museum. A commission to study the idea of the museum was originally created in 2008, and its May 2011 report called for federal legislation to establish a museum. Legislation was subsequently introduced in Congress and the Consolidated Appropriations Act, 2021 established the museum.

== History ==
=== Background and beginnings ===
The idea for a national Smithsonian museum dedicated to the artistic, musical, literary, political, economic, and other socio-economic contributions of Americans with Cuban, Mexican, South American, and Spanish backgrounds (among others) was first broached in the mid-1990s. In April 1993, Robert McCormick Adams, Jr., Secretary of the Smithsonian, and Under Secretary Constance Berry Newman appointed a 15-member task force to study the role of and focus on Latinos in Smithsonian Institution budget, collections and exhibits, governance, personnel policies, and programs. In 1994, it issued a report, titled Willful Neglect, which concluded that the Smithsonian had ignored the contributions of Hispanics and Latinos in its exhibits and that a new national museum might help to correct the problem.

In 2003, Representative Xavier Becerra introduced legislation to establish a commission to study such a museum. It became law on May 8, 2008, creating the Commission to Study the Potential Creation of the National Museum of the American Latino, with 23 members appointed by the president and congressional leadership. The commission was authorized to spend $3.2 million over two years, and charged with studying the need for a museum, the museum's vision and purpose, possible governance structure, potential sites, construction costs, and how funds for the museum might be raised. The commission held its inaugural meeting on September 18–19, 2009. Henry Munoz III, a San Antonio architect, was chosen as the commission's chairman.

In February 2010, the commission gave a preliminary estimate of $250 million to $500 million for construction alone. The commission hired contractors to help with its feasibility studies. A series of public meetings were held to judge public interest in a museum, and provide input and feedback on the issues under discussion by the commission. In May 2010, commission staff said that the commission was considering a traveling or virtual museum, as well as locating the museum in a city other than Washington, D.C. The commission also heard testimony voicing concern over the use of the word "Latino" in the museum's name.

=== Report ===
On April 21, 2011, the New York Times reported that the commission had already settled on a building about 310,000 square feet (29,000 m^{2}) in size, which would be approximately the same size as the $250 million National Museum of African American History and Culture. The commission was said to have selected four sites on the National Mall for the proposed museum.

The commission issued its report on May 4, 2011. Nine sites were considered for the potential museum, including one on the grounds of the U.S. Capitol. But this site, although preferred by the commission, was ultimately rejected due to security concerns and because the land would continue to be owned by the United States Senate and not the Smithsonian. Instead, it recommended that an underground museum be built on the National Mall next to and below the Arts and Industries Building, with an entrance and introductory displays within a portion of that historic structure. The commission said it would cost $600 million to build and endow the museum, and said that half of this money should be raised from private donors. Congress would not need to provide funding until at least 2017. Fundraising for both construction and the endowment would take 10 years.

=== Legislative attempts to establish a museum ===
In November 2011, nine members of the Senate and two members of the House of Representatives introduced legislation (H.R. 3459) in Congress to authorize the Smithsonian to establish the new museum and to proceed with planning and fund-raising. On December 8, the group Friends of the National Museum of the American Latino (FRIENDS) announced that actress Eva Longoria and music producer Emilio Estefan would lead a campaign to build support for the museum. The museum proposal drew criticism for encouraging cultural isolationism, for seeking space on the already-crowded National Mall, and for its cost. The 2011 legislation was not acted on.

On March 15, 2013, new legislation (H.R. 1217/S. 568) was introduced to designate the Smithsonian's Arts and Industries Building as the site of the museum. The bills, co-sponsored by senators Bob Menendez, Harry Reid, and Marco Rubio and representatives Xavier Becerra and Ileana Ros-Lehtinen, would also require the Smithsonian to establish a formal panel to study how to fund the museum and what a construction timeline should be. The bills would not commit the government to build the museum, however. Museum backers already had a design for the proposed museum and began a formal push to win passage of the legislation that year, but Fox News Latino called the museum effort "in indefinite limbo" and the bills did not move forward.

A bipartisan group of lawmakers in both houses reintroduced legislation in June 2017. They were joined on the Capitol grounds by actress and activist Diane Guerrero and FRIENDS, a coalition of corporations, nonprofits and trade associations, to formally introduce the legislation, the National Museum of the American Latino Act (H.R. 2911), to secure a location on the National Mall. The legislation followed the funding model of the newly opened and highly acclaimed National Museum of African American History and Culture with a 50/50 split of public and private dollars. It also authorizes the Smithsonian Institution to conduct a feasibility study over an 18-month period.

The museum was established in the Consolidated Appropriations Act, 2021 in December 2020, along with the Smithsonian American Women's History Museum. The bill provides half of the funding for the museum's construction, with the other half expected to come from private donations, as with the National Museum of African American History and Culture. It created a board of trustees that acquire artifacts for the museum, develop content of exhibits, and coordinate fundraising.

Sites under consideration in the bill are the Arts and Industries Building, the Jamie L. Whitten Building, the site across the mall from the African American Museum, and the site east of the National Gallery of Art.

=== First exhibit and future opening ===
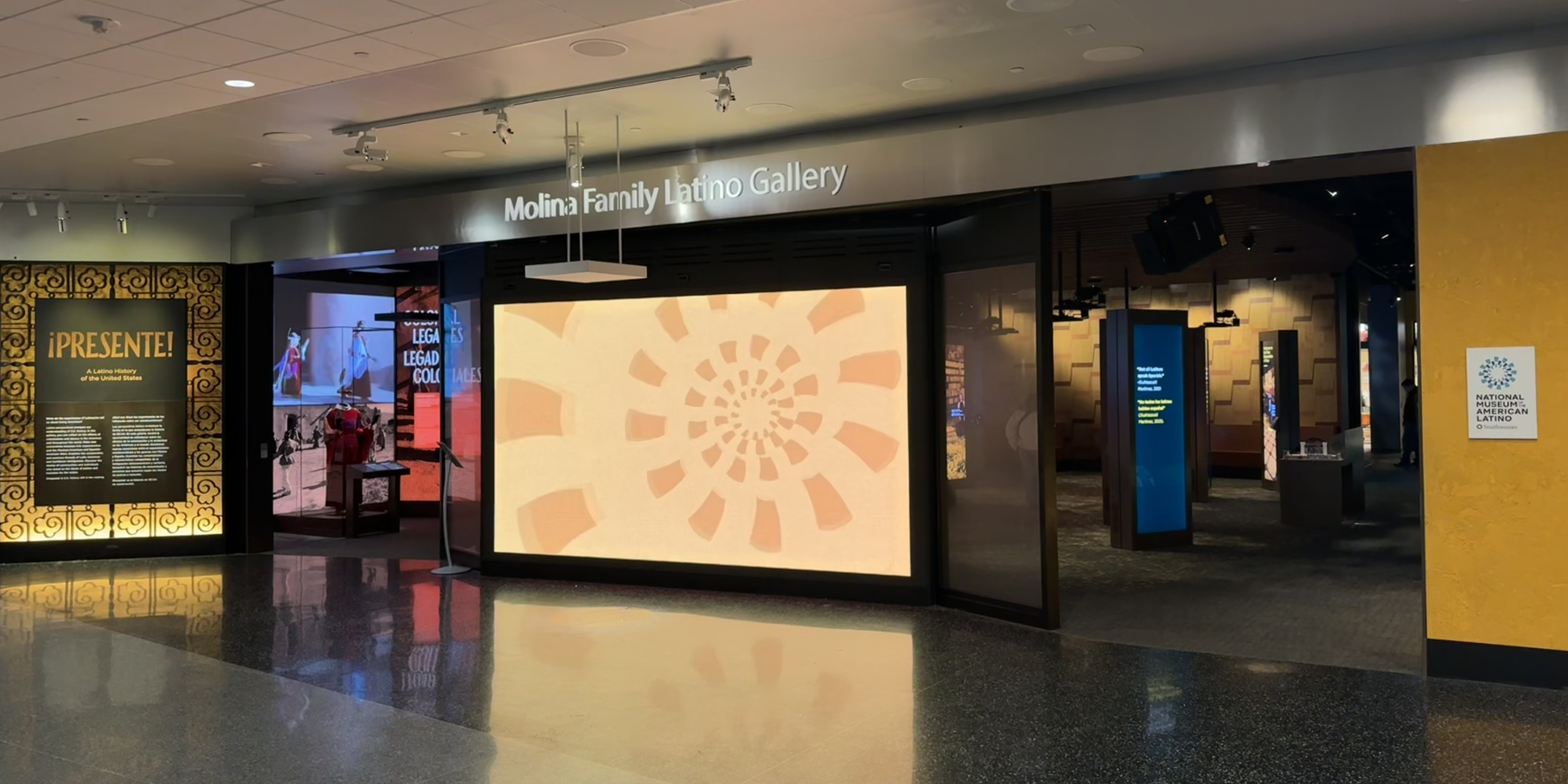
The museum's first exhibition, held in the Molina Family Latino Gallery at the National Museum of American History

In June 2022, the National Museum of American History started hosting ¡Presente! A Latino History of the United States, which is classified as the first exhibit of the new museum. The exhibit serves as a "101 on American Latino presence in the United States and how it fits into the larger American history narrative" according to Jorge Zamanillo, the director of the National Museum of the American Latino. The full physical museum building is expected to open sometime around 2032 to 2034.

=== Museum site chosen ===
In August 2026, the Smithsonian's Board of Regents voted to locate the museum in the Arts & Industries Building on the National Mall. By choosing a preexisting Smithsonian facility, the institution was not required to seek legislative action for the siting of the museum.

== See also ==
- National Museum of Mexican Art
