= Xiaodan Gu =

American scientist

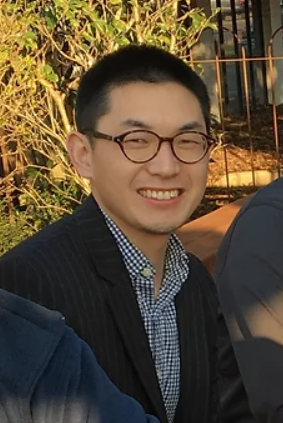
- Education: Nanjing University (BS); University of Massachusetts, Amherst (PhD)
- Scientific career
- Fields: Polymer science Polymer Physics
- Workplaces: The University of Southern Mississippi; SLAC National Accelerator Laboratory; Stanford University; Berkeley Advanced Light Source
- Thesis: Self-assembly of Block Copolymers by Solvent Vapor Annealing, Mechanism and Lithographic Applications (2013)
- Doctoral advisor: Thomas P. Russell
- Other academic advisors: Zhenan Bao (postdoctoral advisor)
- Notable students: Zachary Chase
- Website: xiaodangu.wixsite.com/guresearchgroup

Xiaodan Gu is the Nina Bell Suggs endowed professor of Polymer Science and Engineering at The University of Southern Mississippi (Southern Miss). Since 2017, Gu has been a professor at Southern Miss where his research involves studying the physics and morphology of conjugated polymers.

Gu's work in polymer science has resulted in a number of recognitions including the NSF CAREER Award and the DOE Early Career Research Award.

== Biography ==
Gu, a native of China, received his Bachelor of Science in chemistry from Nanjing University in 2008. He went on to complete his doctorate degree at the University of Massachusetts, Amherst where he studied block copolymers and morphological patterning techniques under Thomas P. Russell. While earning his doctorate, Gu earned a doctoral fellowship at Lawrence Berkeley National Laboratory where he worked as a visiting scientist at the Advanced Light Source and the Molecular Foundry. He earned his Ph.D. in Polymer Science and Engineering in 2014 after which he accepted a postdoctoral position at Stanford University and SLAC National Lab. At Stanford, Gu worked with Zhenan Bao and Michael F. Toney on flexible electronics and roll-to-roll printed electronics. In 2017, Gu joined Southern Miss as an assistant professor before becoming tenured in 2022.

== Research ==
Gu's research focuses primarily on polymer semiconductors and the influence that physical forces have on their properties and morphology. Gu's lab investigates donor-acceptor polymers for use in stretchable electronics by studying how the morphology of thin films can be manipulated to achieve specific electronic and optical properties. In working towards this goal, Gu's lab has developed a method to investigate the mechanical properties of ultra-thin polymer films. The method, called the Shear Motion Assisted Robust Transfer (SMART) method employs the use of a liquid support to accomplish a pseudo-free-standing tensile test.

Gu's lab also focuses on characterization methods for understanding the structure, chain conformation, and various polymer dynamics that influence the macroscopic properties of conjugated polymers. His research in X-ray and neutron scattering was recently featured in "35 Challenges in Materials Science Being Tackled by PIs under 35," published by Matter. Gu stated that his goal is to "combat the challenges associated with developing autonomous in-situ characterization that can speed up new materials discovery."

In 2018, Gu was named as a leader for the future Center for Optoelectronic Materials and Devices at Southern Miss which plans to promote collaborative research in emerging areas of polymer optoelectronics.

== Awards and recognition ==
Gu's early work has garnered several awards. Additionally, several of his students have collected a number of recognitions, such as winning the NSF Graduate Research Fellowship and the Barry Goldwater Scholarship, and becoming finalists for the Fulbright Program and the Frank J. Padden Jr. Award.

Gu has been recognized with:

- 3M Non-Tenured Faculty Award
- Journal of Materials Chemistry C Emerging Investigators
- Featured in "35 challenges in materials science being tackled by PIs under 35"
- ACS Polymer Au Rising Stars in Polymers 2021
- Department of Energy Early Career Research Program Award
- NSF Faculty Early Career Development Award
- Ralph E. Powe Junior Faculty Enhancement Award
