= EV Nautilus =

Research vessel

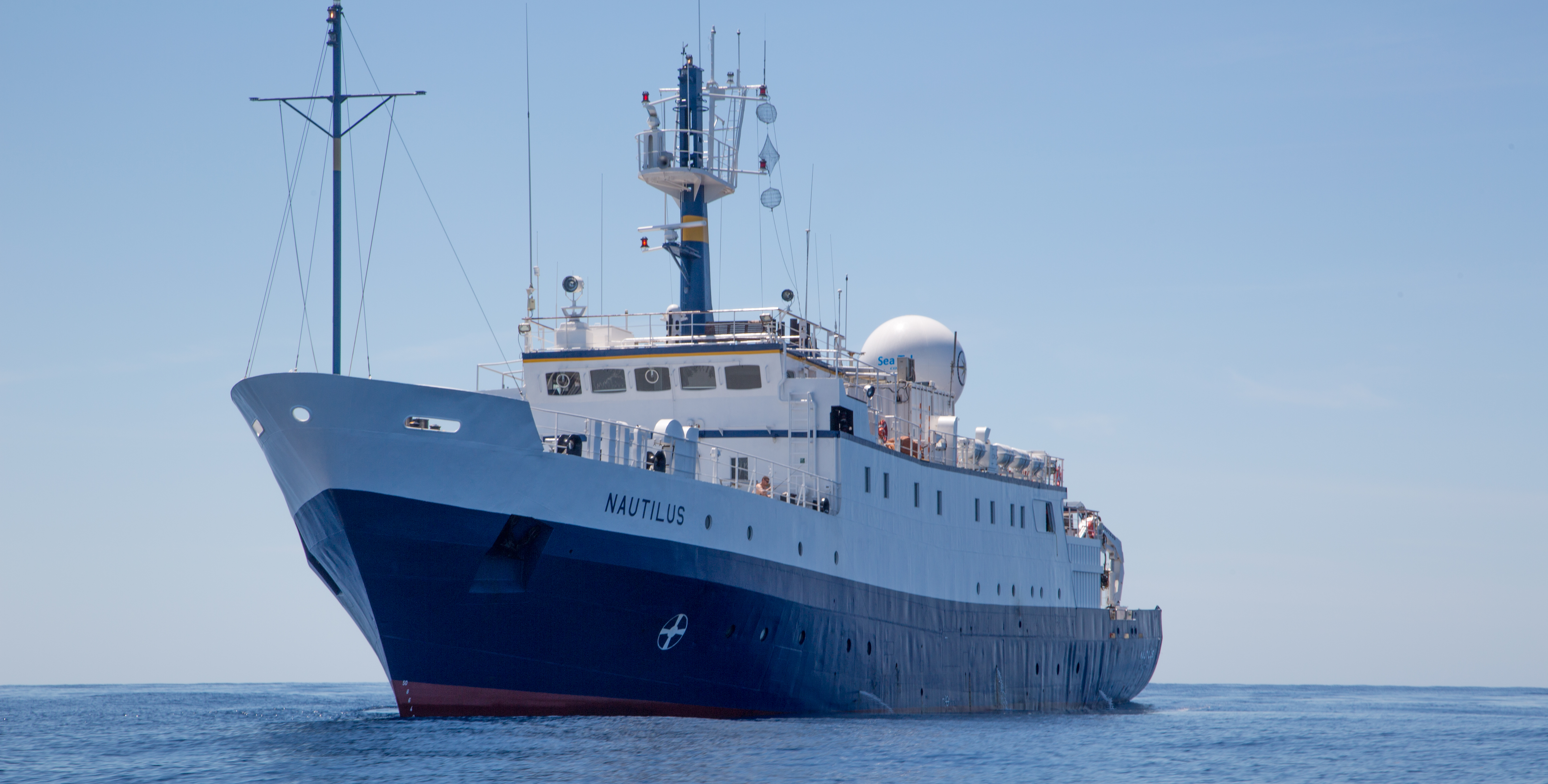

History

Saint Vincent and the Grenadines
- Name: Nautilus
- Builder: Ps Werften Wolgast, East Germany
- Laid down: 1967
- Renamed: 30 July 2009
- Homeport: Los Angeles, California
- Identification: IMO number: 6711883; MMSI number: 376404000; Callsign: J8B3605

General characteristics
- Class & type: Germanischer Lloyd 100 A5 E1
- Tonnage: 1,249 GT, 374 NT
- Length: 223 ft (68 m)
- Beam: 34.5 ft (10.5 m)
- Installed power: 1,472 kilowatts (1,974 hp)
- Speed: 10 knots (19 km/h; 12 mph)
- Complement: 17 crew, 31 science/mission

EV Nautilus is a 68-meter (223 ft) research vessel owned by the Ocean Exploration Trust under the direction of Robert Ballard, the researcher known for finding the wreck of the Titanic and the German battleship Bismarck. The vessel's home port is at the AltaSea facility in San Pedro in the Port of Los Angeles, California. Nautilus is equipped with a team of remotely operated vehicles (ROVs), Hercules, Argus, Little Hercules, and Atalanta, a multibeam mapping system, and mapping tools Diana and Echo, allowing it to conduct deep sea exploration of the ocean to a depth of 4,000 meters (13,000 ft).

== History ==
The ship was originally the FS A. v. Humboldt, and was in service for the Leibniz Institute for Baltic Sea Research Warnemünde (IOW) until 2004.

The vessel underwent a partial refit in 2021; which saw the vessel lengthened to 68 meters, the addition of a crane, additional cabins, and a mission control center.

== Remotely operated vehicles ==
=== Hercules ===
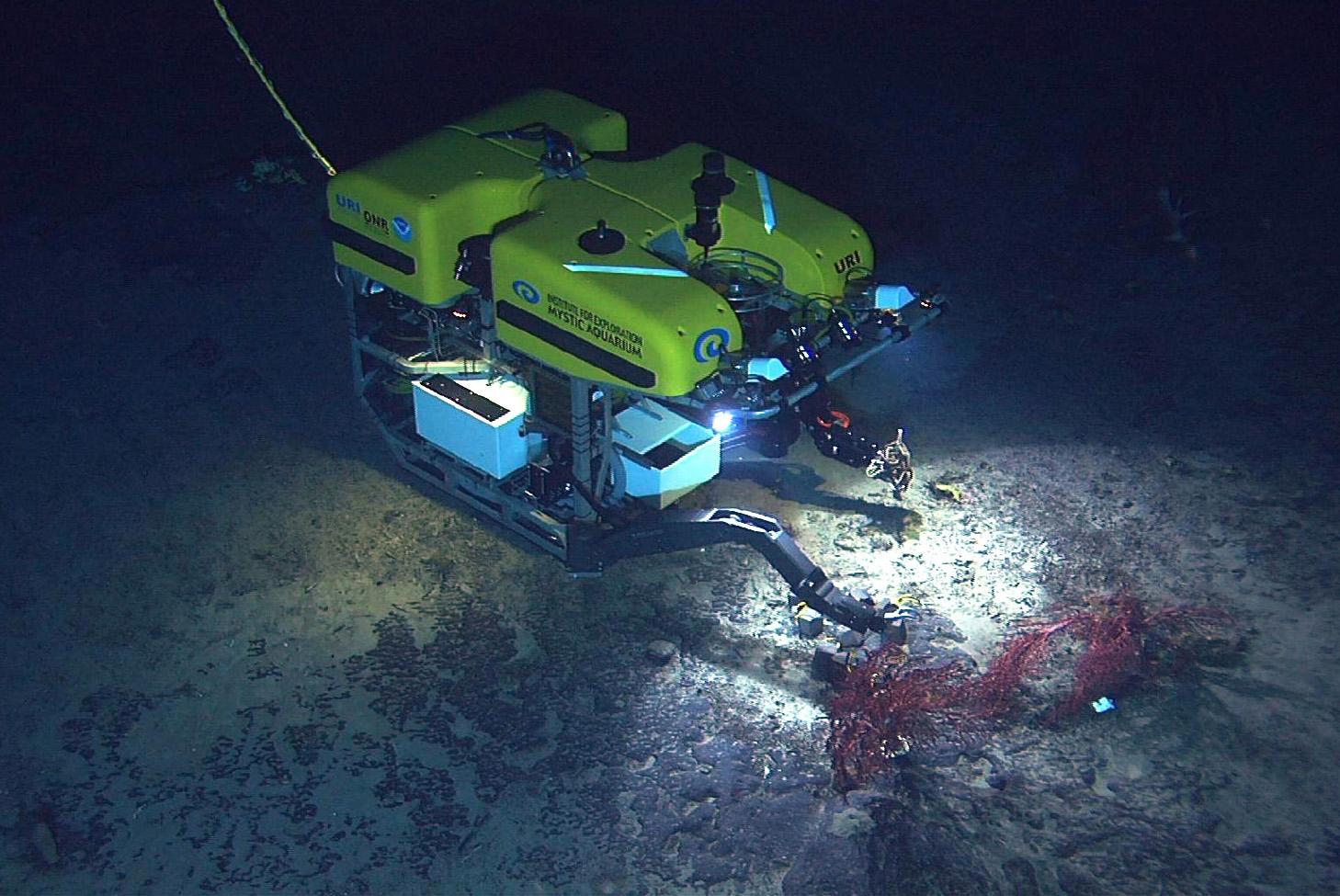
ROV Hercules

Hercules is the primary vehicle of a two-body remotely operated underwater vehicle (ROV) system. Hercules is rated to a depth of 4,000 meters (13,000 ft), and is always deployed with Argus. It is equipped with cameras, lights, instruments, manipulators, and a wide array of sampling tools. The primary camera is a high definition system augmented by six standard-definition cameras. Four lights (over 60,000 lumens total) illuminate the forward working area, while smaller incandescent lights provide auxiliary illumination. Standard instrumentation includes a fast profiling conductivity-temperature-depth (CTD) sensor, an oxygen probe, two high-resolution scanning sonars, a 1.2 MHz multibeam sonar and a high resolution stereo still camera system. The primary manipulator is an arm with force feedback, complemented by a seven-function manipulator for sample collection. Hercules is also equipped with a number of tools, including a suction sampler, sampling boxes with actuating trays, and sediment coring equipment, as well as several other purpose-built tools for different scientific objectives. Using a navigation system in tandem with ultra-short baseline positioning, Hercules is capable of maneuvering and hovering on a centimeter-scale grid.

=== Argus ===
Argus is a deep-tow system capable of diving as deep as 6,000 meters (20,000 ft). Argus is typically used in tandem with Hercules, where it hovers several meters above the seafloor and provides a view of Hercules on the seafloor, but can also be used as a standalone tow sled. The frame carries a broadcast quality high definition camera, standard definition cameras, and two 1,200 Watt arc lamps capable of producing over 100,000 lumens of light each. Argus also supports a wide range of instrumentation, including a depth sensor, altimeter, CTD, sub-bottom profiler, scanning sonar, and side-scan sonar. Argus uses dual 2-horsepower (1.5 kW) electric thrusters for heading adjustment and limited lateral movement.

=== Diana ===
Diana is one of two side-scan sonar systems on board Nautilus. It is used to create maps of the seafloor and to identify targets of interest that ROVs Hercules and Argus investigate in more detail. Diana is a side-scan sonar tow-fish that uses dual 300 and 600 kHz frequencies, with a range of approximately 200 meters on either side of the towfish. The Diana system is capable of being towed to a depth of 2,000 meters (6,600 ft) but is limited by cable length to 600 meters (2,000 ft). Diana's transducers can also be installed on the Argus towsled, which greatly increases the maximum towing depth to 2,000 meters.

=== Echo ===
Echo is a five-channel deep tow, side scan sonar system rated to 3,000 meters (9,800 ft) water depth. Echo's operating frequencies are 100 and 400 kHz, which cover a total swath width up to 1,000 meters (3,300 ft). Echo is also equipped with a 2–7 kHz sub-bottom profiler that permits identification of sub-seafloor features.

== Telepresence systems ==
The EV Nautilus satellite system uses a very-small aperture terminal (VSAT) to enable two-way Internet connectivity between ship and shore. The maximum uplink capability is up to 46 Mbit/s, depending on the ship’s location and the satellite being used. The signal is sent from Nautilus to a geosynchronous satellite, and then down to a ground station in Andover, Maine. The ground station passes the signals to the Inner Space Center (ISC) at the University of Rhode Island Graduate School of Oceanography. From the ISC, the multicast video streams are distributed to the Internet and used in highlight reels and webcasts. During expeditions, Nautilus can send broadcast-quality video streams, associated intercom traffic and data back to shore in real time.

All audio components of the telepresence network use a centralized intercom system for managing shipboard and ship-to-shore communications. This network provides communication between users working in the control van, the ship's officers on the bridge, and the various labs around the ship, as well as participants on shore. The intercom system is integrated with the Nautilus video streaming and video recording subsystems, which allow the intercom audio to be heard in the live video streams on shore and in the recorded video clips.

== Live production studio ==
A studio was built on board Nautilus to support live interactions and outreach production. Educators and scientists conduct interactive interviews with partners located at schools, museums, aquariums, and science centers around the world. Shore-based groups are able to communicate with the ship either with an intercom unit or via a telephone number that is bridged into the shipboard intercom system.

== See also ==
- Allison Fundis, chief operating officer of Ocean Exploration Trust
