= Edna Cukierman =

Mexican biochemist and academic

Eti Cukierman
- אתי קוקיירמן
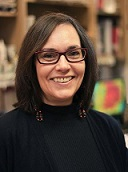
- Cukierman in a Congressionally Directed Medical Research Programs (CDMRP) photo, 2018
- Born: Edna Cukierman; Mexico City
- Education: Technion – Israel Institute of Technology
- Scientific career
- Fields: Tumor microenvironment Cancer associated fibroblasts Extracellular matrix Pancreatic cancer Desmoplasia
- Workplaces: National Institute of Dental and Craniofacial Research; Fox Chase Cancer Center
- Thesis: Molecular characterization of an ARF directed GTPase activating protein (1997)
- Doctoral students: Jaye Gardiner
- Website: www.foxchase.org/edna-cukierman

Edna "Eti" Cukierman (Hebrew: עדנה "אתי" צוקירמן) is a Mexican biochemist who is a professor at the Fox Chase Cancer Center. She serves as co-director of the Marvin & Concetta Greenberg Pancreatic Cancer Institute, and co-leader of the Cancer Signaling and Microenvironment Program at Fox Chase. Her research investigates pancreatic cancer and the tumor microenvironment.

== Early life and education ==
Cukierman was born in Mexico City. She emigrated to Israel in 1986. She joined Technion – Israel Institute of Technology for her doctoral research, where she studied ARF directed GTPase.

== Research and career ==
After her PhD, Cukierman was awarded a postdoctoral fellowship in 1997, and joined the National Institute of Dental and Craniofacial Research. She developed a multilayered fibroblastic cell-derived extracellular matrix, which became widely used in biomaterials research.

Cukierman joined the Fox Chase Cancer Center in 2002. She studies pancreatic cancer, with a specific focus on the tumor microenvironment and the identification of strategies that can change the tumor microenvironment. Desmoplasia, which is the growth of connective tissue, shows similarities to wound healing pathologies (e.g. chronic inflammation). She believes it will be possible to stall the growth of tumors by transforming the microenvironment into one which harnesses anti-tumor functions.

In 2005, Cukierman demonstrated that desmoplastic extracellular matrices could induce a myofibroblastic phenotype on naïve fibroblastic cells. This work involved the realization of a human mimetic three-dimensional stroma system, which allowed Cukierman to understand the extracellular factors that determine the function of fibroblasts. Through multi-cellular culturing, Cukierman has shown how cancer-associated fibroblasts impart immunosuppressive influences, communicate and provide nutrition to cancer cells. She identified that cancer communication involved the TGF beta signaling pathway, extracellular matrix and integrin signalling pathway and the reorganization of cytoskeletal elements. She demonstrated that the glutamatergic presynaptic protein Netrin G1 promoted tumorgenesis by providing nutritional support and immunity to cancer-associated fibroblasts. She has shown that anti-Netrin G1 antibodies can halt tumorgenesis.

Cukierman joined the American Gastroenterological Association in 2010. At the time, this was considered novel because the association is mainly a medical association, and Cukierman is not a physician. In 2017, she established the Marvin and Concetta Greenberg Pancreatic Cancer Institute.

=== Awards and honors ===
- 2004 AACR-Pennsylvania Department of Health Career Development Award
- 2005 Nikon Small World Competition Image of Distinction
- 2015 United States Department of Defense Idea Award
- 2016 Chinese Society of Clinical Oncology Distinguished Achievement Award
- 2020 Elected to the Council of the American Society of Matrix Biology
- 2020 Worldwide Cancer Research Award
- 2020 Elected Fellow of the American Gastroenterological Association

=== Academic service ===
Cukierman has supported the development of early career researchers, and has developed a philosophy around teaching and mentoring. She is a member of the American Cancer Society, and on the editorial board of Matrix Biology.

=== Selected publications ===
- Taking cell-matrix adhesions to the third dimension
- Modeling tissue morphogenesis and cancer in 3D
- A framework for advancing our understanding of cancer-associated fibroblasts
