= Zhenan Bao =

Chemical engineer

- 鲍哲南
- Bao in 2024
- Born: 1970 (age 55–56); Nanjing, Jiangsu, China
- Citizenship: United States
- Education: Nanjing University; University of Illinois Chicago; University of Chicago (MS, PhD)
- Known for: Organic semiconductors, electronic skin
- Scientific career
- Fields: Polymer science
- Workplaces: Lucent Technologies, Inc.; Stanford University
- Thesis: Exploration of palladium-catalyzed reactions for the syntheses of functional conjugated polymers (1995)
- Doctoral advisor: Luping Yu
- Notable students: Helen Tran; Xiaodan Gu; Jia Liu
- Website: baogroup.stanford.edu

Zhenan Bao (Chinese: 鲍哲南; pinyin: Bào Zhé-nán; born 1970) is a Chinese-born American chemical engineer. She serves as K. K. Lee Professor of Chemical Engineering at Stanford University, with courtesy appointments in Chemistry and Material Science and Engineering. She served as the Department Chair of Chemical Engineering from 2018 to 2022. She was an Associate Editor for the Royal Society of Chemistry journal Chemical Science, Polymer Reviews and Synthetic Metals. Bao is known for her work on organic field-effect transistors and organic semiconductors, for applications including flexible electronics and electronic skin.

== Early life and education ==
Bao was born in Nanjing, China in 1970. She is the daughter of a professor of physical chemistry at Nanjing University.

Bao studied chemistry as an undergraduate student at Nanjing University beginning in 1987. While at Nanjing University, she worked in the laboratory of Gi Xue on gold cross-linked polymers.

In 1990, Bao moved to the United States with her family, enrolling in the University of Illinois at Chicago as she had family nearby. Several months later, Bao was accepted directly into the PhD program in chemistry at the University of Chicago without a bachelor's degree, owing to two awards she won while an undergraduate at Nanjing University. At the University of Chicago, as one of the first graduate students of Luping Yu, Bao applied palladium-catalyzed cross-coupling reactions towards the synthesis of conductive and liquid crystalline polymers.

Bao received a Master of Science in chemistry in 1993 and a Doctor of Philosophy in chemistry in 1995, both from the University of Chicago. To this day, she does not hold any bachelor's degrees.

== Career ==
Upon the completion of her doctorate, Bao received an offer to join the University of California, Berkeley as a postdoctoral scholar, but instead chose to join the Materials Research Department at Bell Labs of Lucent Technologies. At Bell Labs, she developed the first all-plastic transistor, or organic field-effect transistor, which allows for use in electronic paper. It was also during this time when Jan Hendrik Schön published a series of papers claiming major breakthroughs involving semiconductors, two of which included Bao as a coauthor. Schön's papers were ultimately retracted due to fraud, but Bao was cleared of allegations of misconduct. She was named a Distinguished Member of Technical Staff at Bell Labs in 2001. She founded the Stanford Wearable Electronics Initiative (eWEAR) and is the current faculty director.

In 2004, she returned to academia by joining the faculty at Stanford University where she is now focusing on studying organic semiconductor and carbon nanotubes using new fabrication methods. Recent work in the lab includes developing electronic skin and all-carbon solar cells. Bao is a co-founder and on the board of directors for C3 Nano and PyrAmes Health, both of which are Silicon Valley venture-funded startup companies. She serves as an advising Partner for Fusion Venture Capital.

== Research ==
Bao and her team of researchers at Stanford University have several current projects in her research group as of 2022. Utilizing a “newly created printing method”, Bao and her team have developed skin-like integrated circuits. This new material can be used for “on-skin sensors, body-scale networks and implantable bioelectronics.” The process used for developing these materials is known as photolithography which, when combined with novel photochemistries, can generate the flexible materials.

In conjunction with Karl Deisseroth, Bao has developed biocompatible polymers that can be used to “modulate the properties of target cells”. These cell-modulating biocompatible polymers alter certain properties of neurons and can either inhibit or boost neuronal firing. This technology can be used as a tool for exploration to better understand diseases such as multiple sclerosis.

== Fellowships and societies ==
=== Fellowships ===
- American Association for the Advancement of Science
- American Chemical Society
- SPIE
- Terman Fellow, Stanford University

=== Advisory board positions ===
- ACS Nano
- Advanced Functional Materials
- Advanced Functional Materials
- Chemical Communications
- Chemistry of Materials
- Materials Today, Nanoscale
- NPG Asia Materials

=== Other positions ===
- Board of Directors, Camille and Henry Dreyfus Foundation, 2022–present.
- Advisory Council Member, Pritzker School of Molecular Engineering, University of Chicago, 2022–present.
- Science Committee member, Future Science Prize of China, 2018–2021.
- Board member, National Academies Board on Chemical Sciences and Technology, 2009–2012.
- Board of Directors, Materials Research Society, 2003–2005.
- Executive Committee Member/Member-at-Large, Polymers Materials Science and Engineering division of the American Chemical Society, 2000–2006, 2009–2012

== Awards and honors ==
- 2000: Named among Top 100 Young Engineers by U.S. National Academy of Engineering.
- 2000: Listed among Top 10 Research Breakthroughs for work on large scale integrated circuits based on organic materials, Science Magazine.
- 2001: Awarded R&D 100 Award for the work on Printed Plastic Circuits for Electronic Paper Displays by R&D Magazine
- 2001: Editor's Choice of the "Best of the Best" in new technology by R&D Magazine.
- 2002: ACS Team Innovation Award.
- 2003: Named Among Top 100 young innovators for this century by MIT Technology Review.
- 2003: University Relations of Lucent Technologies Best Mentor Award.
- 2004: 3M Faculty Award.
- 2004–2005: Robert Noyce Faculty Scholar.
- 2009: Awarded Beilby Medal and Prize for her contributions and discoveries in the field of organic semiconductors.
- 2011: ACS Cope Scholar Award.
- 2013: Named one of MIT Technology Review's TR35 and C&EN 12 rising stars for her work with organic semiconductors.
- 2015: Named one of Nature's 10 "people who mattered" in science for her work with wearable electronics, including artificial skin that mimics touch sense.
- 2016: Elected as a member into the U.S. National Academy of Engineering.
- 2017: Laureate of L'Oréal-UNESCO Awards for Women in Science for her contribution to the development of novel functional polymers for consumer electronics, energy storage and biomedical applications.
- 2017: ACS Award in Applied Polymer Science "for pioneering work on the design, processing, and applications of polymer electronic materials for flexible and stretchable electronics."
- 2020: Willard Gibbs Award.
- 2021: Elected to American Academy of Arts and Sciences.
- 2021: Awarded ACS POLY Charles G. Overberger International Prize for Excellence Polymer Research.
- 2021: Awarded MRS Mid-Career Award.
- 2021: Awarded AICHE Alpha Chi Sigma Award for Chemical Engineering Research.
- 2021: Awarded Alumni Professional Achievement Award by the Alumni Board of the University of Chicago.
- 2022: Awarded ACS Chemistry of Materials Award.
- 2022: Awarded the VinFuture Prize in Female Innovator category for the development of electronic skins.
- 2023: Samsung Research Award, Samsung Electronics
- 2023: Innovation Investigator, Arc Institute
- 2024: Member, National Academy of Science, National Academy of Sciences
- 2024: Fellow, Asian American Academy of Science and Engineering (AAASE)
- 2024: Faculty Women's Forum (FWF) Outstanding Leader Award, Stanford University

== Personal life ==
One of her major mentors was Elsa Reichmanis, who was the department director at Bell Labs. She is married and has two children.
