= Kellyn LaCour-Conant =

Restoration Ecologist

- Born: Houston, TX
- Citizenship: USA
- Education: Amherst College (BA), Nicholls State (MS), Southern University and A&M College (PhD)
- Occupation: Restoration Ecologist

Kellyn LaCour-Conant is a restoration ecologist specializing in coastal and forested ecosystems, climate resilience, and traditional ecological knowledge (TEK). She has led and supported wetland protection, intersectional research, and environmental justice movements, particularly across the Gulf South, Appalachia, and Global South.

LaCour-Conant was featured in the #IfThenSheCan Exhibit celebrating contemporary women innovators in STEM at the Smithsonian in 2022.

== Background ==
LaCour-Conant grew up in Houston, Texas, with family roots in the Isle Brevelle Creole community. As a teen she served extensively with the Student Conservation Association, working alongside professionals from the U.S. Army Corps of Engineers, National Park Service, and Bureau of Land Management. She was also active with Interfaith Ministries of Greater Houston, the Texas Wildlife Rehab Coalition, Model United Nations, World Quest, and the University Interscholastic League in high school.

LaCour-Conant earned Bachelor's in biology and Russian from Amherst College, and later a Master's in Marine and Environmental Biology from Nicholls State, where she conducted research on long-term impacts of the Deepwater Horizon oil spill and studies on Lycium carolinianum. She later worked for the Coastal Protection and Restoration Authority until 2020, when she began managing community farms with Baton Roots (The Walls Project) to address food insecurity during the COVID-19 pandemic.

LaCour-Conant was selected as an #If/Then Ambassador in 2019 by the American Association for the Advancement of Science to amplify the stories of women in STEM. Through the #IF/THEN Initiative, she was featured in 2020 on the CBS television series Mission Unstoppable to highlight coastal restoration efforts in Louisiana and coastal science careers.

In 2021, LaCour-Conant served as the Director of Habitat Restoration Programs with the Coalition to Restore Central Louisiana (CRCL) where she led the Native Plant and Oyster Shell Recycling Programs. LaCour-Conant expanded CRCL's work with tribal communities to protect sacred mound sites, and earned CRCL a National Academies' award for her Community Art Living Shorelines (CALS) proposal, which fostered innovative community engagement in coastal restoration.

From 2022-2025, LaCour-Conant served as Senior Climate Strategist with Taproot Earth, a US nonprofit advancing community-led climate solutions. With Taproot Earth, LaCour-Conant led participatory policy research and co-facilitated Global Climate Reparations assemblies in Nairobi 2024 and Rome 2025. In this time she also served on the Standing Committee for the National Academies Mississippi River Delta Transition Initiative (MissDelta), a research consortium effort to forecast the physical and socioeconomic future of the Mississippi River Delta under conditions of climate change and other factors to inform river management.

LaCour-Conant has served on various Boards and Advisory Committees in the south Louisiana area, including the Board of Directors for Common Ground Relief and The New Orleans Water Collaborative, the Foundation for Louisiana's Truth, Racial Healing, and Transformation Committee, and the Louisiana Environmental Education Collective Impact hosted by The Ripple Effect.

LaCour-Conant completed her Ph.D. in Urban Forestry at Southern University, with a dissertation on historic land use, oral history, climate resilience, and federal management of Kisatchie National Forest. She was named an Intergenerational Knowledge Transmission Awardee by the Center for Cultural Power in 2023 for her research.
