= The Deadliest Disease in America =

2010 US health documentary

- Directed by: Crystal R. Emery
- Written by: Crystal R. Emery
- Produced by: Crystal R. Emery
- Starring: Dr. Marcella Nunez-Smith; Dr. Camara Jones; Dr. Harlan Krumholz; Dr. Amelie G. Ramirez
- Production company: The URU Right To Be
- Distributed by: The URU Right To Be
- Release date: 27 January 2010; (USA)
- Running time: 108 minutes
- Country: United States
- Language: English

The Deadliest Disease in America is a 2010 documentary film directed and produced by Crystal R. Emery. The film features commentary from medical and public health experts including Dr. Marcella Nunez-Smith, Dr. Camara Jones, Dr. Harlan Krumholz and Dr. Amelie G. Ramirez, and focuses on the history of racism in American healthcare including brutal scientific experiments that were done on African slaves, and the inequalities and biases that continue to produce worse health outcomes for Black people.

The film was shot in New Haven, Connecticut, USA, and took ten years to complete. It premiered on 27 January 2010, and received positive reviews from critics. The film was again screened at New York City’s Cinema Village on September 10 and running through September 16, 2021.

== Cast ==
- William Chapin, PT
- Dr. Amelie G. Ramirez, P.H.
- Dr. Harlan Krumholz
- Dr. Marcella Nunez-Smith
- Elisabeth Krause
- Dr. Bert Petersen
- Anna Novais
- Durrell J. Fox
- Dr. Camara Jones
