= Helen Tran =

American chemist and academic

- Education: Columbia University; University of California, Berkeley
- Scientific career
- Workplaces: University of Toronto; Lawrence Berkeley National Laboratory
- Thesis: Block copolymer templates for functional nanostructured materials : Periodic patterning and hierarchical ordering (2016)

Helen Tran is a professor of chemistry at the University of Toronto. She was named by Chemical & Engineering News as one of their "Talented 12" in 2022. A statue of Tran was exhibited for the IfThenSheCan exhibit in the NorthPark Center in Dallas in 2021 and in Washington, D.C., in March 2022.

== Early life and education ==
Tran grew up in the United States. She was interested in art when she was at middle school, but shifted her focus to chemistry during her undergraduate studies at the University of California, Berkeley. Tran then worked at the Lawrence Berkeley National Laboratory with polymer chemist Ron Zuckerman. Tran was a graduate student at Columbia University, where she worked alongside Luis Campos on hierarchical ordering in block co-polymer systems. After earning her doctorate, she moved to Stanford University, where she worked under the supervision of Zhenan Bao. She was selected as an American Association for the Advancement of Science IF/THEN ambassador in 2019.

== Research and career ==
Tran's research considers next-generation materials that are stimuli-responsive for novel technologies. She started her independent scientific career at the University of Toronto in 2021. She has studied peptide-like polymers, 'peptoids', which undergo self-assembly to form useful nanomaterials.

== Awards and honors ==
- 2019 American Association for the Advancement of Science IF/THEN Ambassador
- 2019 Helena Anna Henzl-Gabor Award
- 2021 Dorothy Shoichet Award
- 2022 Chemical & Engineering News Talented 12

== Selected publications ==
- Lei Wang; I Meric; Pinshane Huang; et al. (November 1, 2013). "One-dimensional electrical contact to a two-dimensional material". Science. 342 (6158): 614–617. doi:10.1126/science.1244358. ISSN 0036-8075. PMID 24179223. Wikidata Q34381846.
- Clementine M Boutry; Levent Beker; Yukitoshi Kaizawa; et al. (January 8, 2019). "Biodegradable and flexible arterial-pulse sensor for the wireless monitoring of blood flow". Nature biomedical engineering. 3 (1): 47–57. doi:10.1038/s41551-018-0336-5. ISSN 2157-846X. PMID 30932072. Wikidata Q92739164.
- Sihong Wang; Jin Young Oh; Jie Xu; Helen Tran; Zhenan Bao (April 25, 2018). "Skin-Inspired Electronics: An Emerging Paradigm". Accounts of Chemical Research. doi:10.1021/acs.accounts.8b00015. ISSN 0001-4842. PMID 29693379. Wikidata Q52564270.
