= Kristen Lear =

Environmental Educator

Kristen Lear is an American bat conservationist and environmental educator. She is an Endangered Species Interventions Specialist at Bat Conservation International. Lear is an If/Then ambassador and was featured in the Smithsonian's "#IfThenSheCan - The Exhibit", a collection of life-sized 3D-printed statues of role models in STEM.

== Early life and education ==
Lear grew up in Cincinnati, Ohio, where she developed an interest in bats from an early age. As a child she loved the book Stellaluna, which features a bat protagonist, and at age 12, she built bat houses for her Girl Scout Silver Award project. Lear graduated from Finneytown High School before going on to receive a BA in zoology from Ohio Wesleyan University and a PhD in integrative conservation from the University of Georgia.

== Career ==
After completing her undergraduate degree in 2011, Lead earned by Fulbright scholarship to monitor Australia's population of the critically endangered Southern bent-wing bat for 14 months.

She works on the conservation of the Mexican long-nosed bat. As part of her PhD program, she spent four summers in Mexico working on conservation of the bat. At Bat Conversation International, she leads an agave restoration program to benefit endangered pollinating bats (including the Mexican long-nosed bat) in the US and Mexico. Lear is a founding member of the Nivalis Conservation Network, a group of US and Mexican researchers, NGOs, and governmental agencies working on the conservation of the Mexican long-nosed bat.

She was featured on the show Mission Unstoppable, which features women in science and is hosted by Miranda Cosgrove.
