= Pinshane Huang =

Materials scientist

Pinshane Yeh Huang
- Born: Arlington, Texas
- Education: Carleton College; Cornell University
- Known for: 2D Materials Electron Microscopy
- Awards: PECASE (2019)
- Scientific career
- Workplaces: Columbia University; University of Illinois Urbana-Champaign
- Thesis: Transmission Electron Microscopy Of Structural Disorder In Two-Dimensional Materials (2014)
- Website: Huang Lab

Pinshane Yeh Huang is an Associate Professor of Materials Science at the University of Illinois Urbana–Champaign. She develops transmission electron microscopy to investigate two-dimensional materials. During her PhD she discovered the thinnest piece of glass in the world, which was included in the Guinness World Records. Huang was awarded the 2019 Presidential Early Career Award for Scientists and Engineers.

== Early life and education ==
Huang grew up in Arlington, Texas. She was interested in science as a child, and eventually studied physics at Carleton College. She was not sure whether she would major in anthropology or physics. She spent a summer teaching science in a summer camp at Johns Hopkins University, and decided that she wanted to be involved with physics teaching. As a senior she played violin. She moved to Cornell University for her graduate studies, completing a PhD in applied physics under the supervision of David A. Muller. Huang started working with graphene in 2009, and developed the methodology to create the world's thinnest sheet of glass. The piece of glass was so thin that it was possible to resolve individual silicon and oxygen atoms using transmission electron microscopy. Huang created the glass by accident whilst making graphene, when she found that her graphene was actually composed from silicon and oxygen, the elements that constitute glass. This accidental discovery made it possible to identify the arrangement of atoms in glass for first time, and was included in the Guinness World Records. Her work involved using two-dimensional materials as a model to investigate the structure-property relationships in materials, as well as informing the design and fabrication of two-dimensional materials with desired chemical, optical and electronic properties. She investigated grain boundaries in molybdenum disulfide and graphene. After earning her doctorate Huang was a postdoctoral researcher at Columbia University, where she worked with Louis E. Brus in the Materials Science & Engineering Research Center.

== Research and career ==
Huang was appointed to the University of Illinois Urbana–Champaign in 2015. Her lab, Small Things Considered, use nanotechnology and electron microscopy to investigate the properties of different materials. She is based in the University of Illinois Urbana–Champaign Materials Research Laboratory. She has pioneered techniques to study individual atoms in glass as it bends and breaks, making it possible to image defects in ultra-thin materials. In particular, Huang works on aberration-corrected electron microscopy to study two-dimensional materials. To visualise glass as it bends, Huang used the electron beam of a transmission electron microscope to simultaneously excite and image atoms within glasses. Huang created videos that make it possible to understand the liquid state of glass. Defects and dopants can have significant impacts on the electronic properties of two-dimensional materials. The materials investigated by Huang have applications in catalysis, energy generation and storage; including solar cells, batteries and graphene-based devices. As the performance of nanostructured catalysts and batteries is determined by the atomic arrangement on the surfaces of nanoparticles, Huang uses atom-by-atom electron microscopy to characterise these interfacial atoms. She combines microscopy with transient spectral imaging to understand the reactivity and stability of metallic nanoparticles. She combines atom-by-atom imaging with device measurements and spectroscopy to correlate atomic structure, performance and optical properties.

Huang told The Daily Telegraph about the need for scientists to engage the public in their research, “If I can do something to inspire a young person to become a scientist, become a teacher, or vote to make sure we have funding for scientific research, that makes it worthwhile for me". Her research was featured in the Science and Industry Museum Wonder Materials exhibition. She has also featured on PBS Nova's Hunting the Elements.

=== Awards and honours ===
Her awards and honours include;

- 2012 Microscopy Society of America Presidential Scholarship
- 2012 Microbeam Analysis Society Raymond Castaing Award
- 2013 Cornell University College of Engineering William Nichols Findley Award
- 2016 Air Force Research Laboratory Young Investigator Award
- 2017 Microscopy Society of America Albert Crewe Award
- 2017 3M Non-Tenured Faculty Award
- 2017 Packard Fellowship
- 2018 Kavli Foundation Fellow
- 2018 Sloan Research Fellowship
- 2018 Global Highly Cited Researcher
- 2019 National Science Foundation CAREER Award
- 2019 Presidential Early Career Award for Scientists and Engineers

=== Selected publications ===
Her publications include;

- Huang, Pinshane (2011). "Grains and grain boundaries in single-layer graphene atomic patchwork quilts". Nature. 469 (7330): 389–92. arXiv:1009.4714. Bibcode:2011Natur.469..389H. doi:10.1038/nature09718. PMID 21209615. S2CID 205223553.
- Huang, Pinshane (2013). "One-dimensional electrical contact to a two-dimensional material". Science. 342 (6158): 614–617. Bibcode:2013Sci...342..614W. doi:10.1126/science.1244358. PMID 24179223. S2CID 24531061.
- Huang, Pinshane (2013). "Grains and grain boundaries in highly crystalline monolayer molybdenum disulphide". Nature Materials. 12 (6): 554–561. arXiv:1301.1985. Bibcode:2013NatMa..12..554V. doi:10.1038/nmat3633. PMID 23644523. S2CID 36712829.
