= Shyla Raghav =

Climate Change Expert

Shyla Raghav is a climate change expert and policy maker. She is the Vice President of Climate Change at the non-profit Conservation International.

== Early life and education ==
Raghav was born in India and lived in Nigeria and Saudi Arabia, where was witnessed the effects of climate change first hand. While in high school, she encouraged her peers to lower their emissions by switching to LED lightbulbs and taking the stairs instead of the elevator.

She studied ecology and international relations at the University of California, Irvine and holds a master's degree in environmental management from Yale University.

== Career ==
Raghav worked as a United Nations delegate for the Maldives before joining Conservation International where she oversees conservation efforts in almost 30 countries. She has been a key contributor to the non-profit's carbon footprint calculator, which allows users to input information about their habits to see the impact on the environment.

She participated in the Paris Agreement negotiations.

Raghav is an If/Then ambassador and was featured in the Smithsonian's "#IfThenSheCan - The Exhibit", a collection of life-sized 3D-printed statues of role models in STEM. As part of her ambassadorship, Raghav led a session at the 2020 Teen Vogue Summit where she spoke about effective science communication, shedding stereotypes of women in the workplace, and making an impact on the climate as a teen.
