= Jess Cramp =

Marine biologist

- Education: James Cook University
- Known for: Shark Research
- Scientific career
- Fields: Marine Biology
- Workplaces: Sharks Pacific

Jess Cramp is an American marine biologist and shark researcher. She is the founder of Sharks Pacific, a non-profit organization focused on compiling and providing data collected during expeditions on sharks and rays in the Cook Islands.

== Career ==
Cramp worked as a biologist in a drug discovery laboratory in San Diego for almost ten years. She volunteered for marine-related initiatives in Central America before moving to the Pacific in 2011. While living in the Cook Islands, Cramp managed the Pacific Islands Conservation Initiative (PICI). She was instrumental in the community campaign that resulted in the Cook Islands Shark Sanctuary. This is the largest shark sanctuary in the world, measuring 772,204-square-miles.

Cramp completed a Ph.D. at James Cook University in Australia, where she studied the effectiveness of large-scale marine reserves on wide-ranging sharks. In 2015, Cramp was named a National Geographic Emerging Explorer. This included a three week long trip, where Cramp visited the northern islands of Darwin and Wolf to study sharks. In 2017, Cramp was awarded a National Geographic grant on "Evaluating the effectiveness of large-scale marine reserves on highly migratory sharks."

Cramp now specializes in conservation policy and engaging communities in ocean management. Cramp founded Sharks Pacific, a non-profit research, policy, and outreach organization that is focused on compiling and providing data collected during expeditions on sharks and rays in the Cook Islands. The data her team collects are used to establish baselines around species distribution and population size. This information is crucial for researchers who are trying to measure changes and impacts to marine habitats over space and time.

In 2019, Cramp was named an AAAS If/Then Ambassador, a program created by the American Association for the Advancement of Science to bring together 125 women from different STEM careers to serve as role models for middle school girls. In 2020, Cramp was featured as part of the IfThenSheCan – The Exhibit, an exhibit of over 120 3-D printed statues featuring the AAAS If/Then Ambassadors.

== Awards and honors ==
- AAAS IF/THEN Ambassador, 2019
- National Geographic Emerging Explorer, 2015

== Selected publications ==
- Global status and conservation potential of reef sharks. Nature. 2020.
- Are we ready for elasmobranch conservation success? John K Carlson, Michelle R Heupel, Chelsey N Young, Jessica E Cramp, and Colin A Simpfendorfer. Environmental Conservation. 2019.
- Benzothiophene containing Rho kinase inhibitors: Efficacy in an animal model of glaucoma. Robert L Davis, Mehmet Kahraman, Thomas J Prins, Yan Beaver, Travis G Cook, Jessica Cramp, Charmagne S Cayanan, Elisabeth MM Gardiner, Marsha A McLaughlin, Abbot F Clark, Mark R Hellberg, Andrew K Shiau, Stewart A Noble, Allen J Borchardt. Bioorganic & Medicinal Chemistry Letters. 2010.
- Beware silent waning of shark protection. Jessica E Cramp, Colin A Simpfendorfer, Robert L Pressey. Science. 2018.
- Cyclic Tetranuclear and Hexanuclear Palladium (II) Complexes and Their Host−guest Chemistry. Judith A Walmsley, Shourong Zhu, Antonio Matilla, Tiffanee G Donowick, Jessica E Cramp, Jose Manuel Tercero, and Tatyana Dalrymple. Inorganic Chemistry. 2007.
