= Kelly Korreck =

American space scientist

Kelly Korreck is an American space scientist. She is currently an astrophysicist at the Center for Astrophysics | Harvard & Smithsonian and Program Scientist at NASA as head of operations for the Solar Wind Electrons Alphas and Protons (SWEAP) instrument aboard the Parker Solar Probe spacecraft.

== Background and scientific career ==
Korreck obtained a BSc in astronomy and physics from the University of Michigan in 1999, followed by a PhD in space physics in 2005. Since 2006, she has worked at the Center for Astrophysics | Harvard & Smithsonian, first as an astrophysicist and, since 2017, as a project manager. She was the science Co-I and chief observer for the X-ray telescope (XRT) aboard JAXA's Hinode spacecraft. Korreck was involved in the development and build of the High Resolution Coronal Imager (Hi-C) Sounding Rocket. She is currently science Co-I for the Solar Wind Electrons Alphas and Protons (SWEAP) instrument on board the Parker Solar Probe spacecraft.

== Research interests ==
Korreck's main research interests are high energy particle processes associated with shocks in the heliosphere and other astronomical systems, such as supernovae.

== Outreach and mentoring ==
Korreck in actively involved in a wide range of outreach and mentoring activities aimed at promoting science and engineering, and increasing engagement. She is one of 125 women selected as American Association for the Advancement of Science (AAAS) IF/THEN ambassadors which seek to further women in STEM. She has also developed a series of planetarium shows about space weather and results from Parker Solar Probe. As part of the American Astronomical Society and Smithsonian Astrophysical Observatory "Space on the Hill" series, Korreck worked on a series of educational programs designed to brief Hill staff about astronomical sciences.

Korreck also undertakes regular media appearances related to space and astronomy.
