= Olivia Castellini =

American physicist and science educator

Olivia Castellini Ph.D.
- Education: University of Wisconsin–Madison
- Employer(s): Museum of Science and Industry, Chicago

Olivia Castellini, an American physicist and science educator, is the senior exhibit developer at the Museum of Science and Industry in Chicago, where she developed the Science Storm exhibit.

== Early education ==
Olivia Castellini was born in Cincinnati, Ohio. She is a member of a family of six girls and one boy. Being raised by supportive parents, each child in her family was encouraged to pursue their different interests. Olivia found her passion for math as she thinks “it’s like solving little puzzles” and “endlessly fascinating.” She also developed her interest in music, which has enriched her capacity of being a scientist. When she was five, she started playing the violin and attended The School of Creative and Performing Arts in Cincinnati when she was in the sixth grade, learning instrumental music, vocal music, and drama.

Seeking her career path, she didn't intend to work on physics at first. Instead, she was more interested in being a cardiac surgeon and wanted to go to medical school. But later, she met her enlightened physics teacher in high school and decided to apply for music and pre-med double major for college. Olivia then went to DePauw University and graduated in 1999 with a physics major registered since the university did not offer a pre-med major.

After Graduate school, Olivia began to look for jobs and ended up with a job that excited her the best. She worked as a program coordinator at the University of Wisconsin-Madison, at the college of engineering, worked with people doing nanotechnology-related research, and translated their lab research into material for the general public. At U.W., Olivia met her advisor, Professor Wendy Crone, and realized her initial interest in big ideas of science and “the excitement of what science is trying to discover, to the public.”

== Career ==
Working as a physicist and science educator, Olivia's career in museums did not evolve until an opportunity of making a prototype exhibit for Discovery World Science + Technology Center. Later, she joined the Museum of Science and Industry in Chicago and worked as an exhibit developer for an exhibition called Science Storms. The exhibit was planned to be small but turned out to be a years-long project and a permanent exhibit now at MSI in Chicago.

Olivia is a senior exhibit developer at the MSI now. She promotes projects related to artificial intelligence, the environment, and other subjects that fit in well with the museums’ mission of creating exhibits designed to spark scientific inquiry and creativity.

== Science Storms ==
Science Storms is a permanent exhibit in the Museum of Science and Industry in Chicago. It transforms Allstate Court to represent the force of nature under one roof, letting the visitors observe and experiment with seven natural phenomena: lighting, fire, tornados, avalanches, tsunamis, sunlight, and atoms in motion.

The brainstorming for the exhibit began in 2003 when the museum initially planned it to be a small 7,000 square foot exhibit. After the museum called together educators, designers, and scientists to explore the exhibit's framework, the original plan quickly blew up and eventually expanded as a 26,000 square foot gallery of spectacle on natural phenomena. The exhibit officially opened in 2010, and its installations are considered the most technically complex and sophisticated by SEGD.

Olivia Castellini was one of six members of the core creative team in-house, who also collaborated with Evidence Design, a design firm based out of Brooklyn. As an exhibit developer, Olivia work jointly with project director to dream up the idea and essential structure. Then they connected with the project manager, who made the exhibit exit in three dimensions.
