= Arts and Industries Building =

Museum in Washington, D.C.

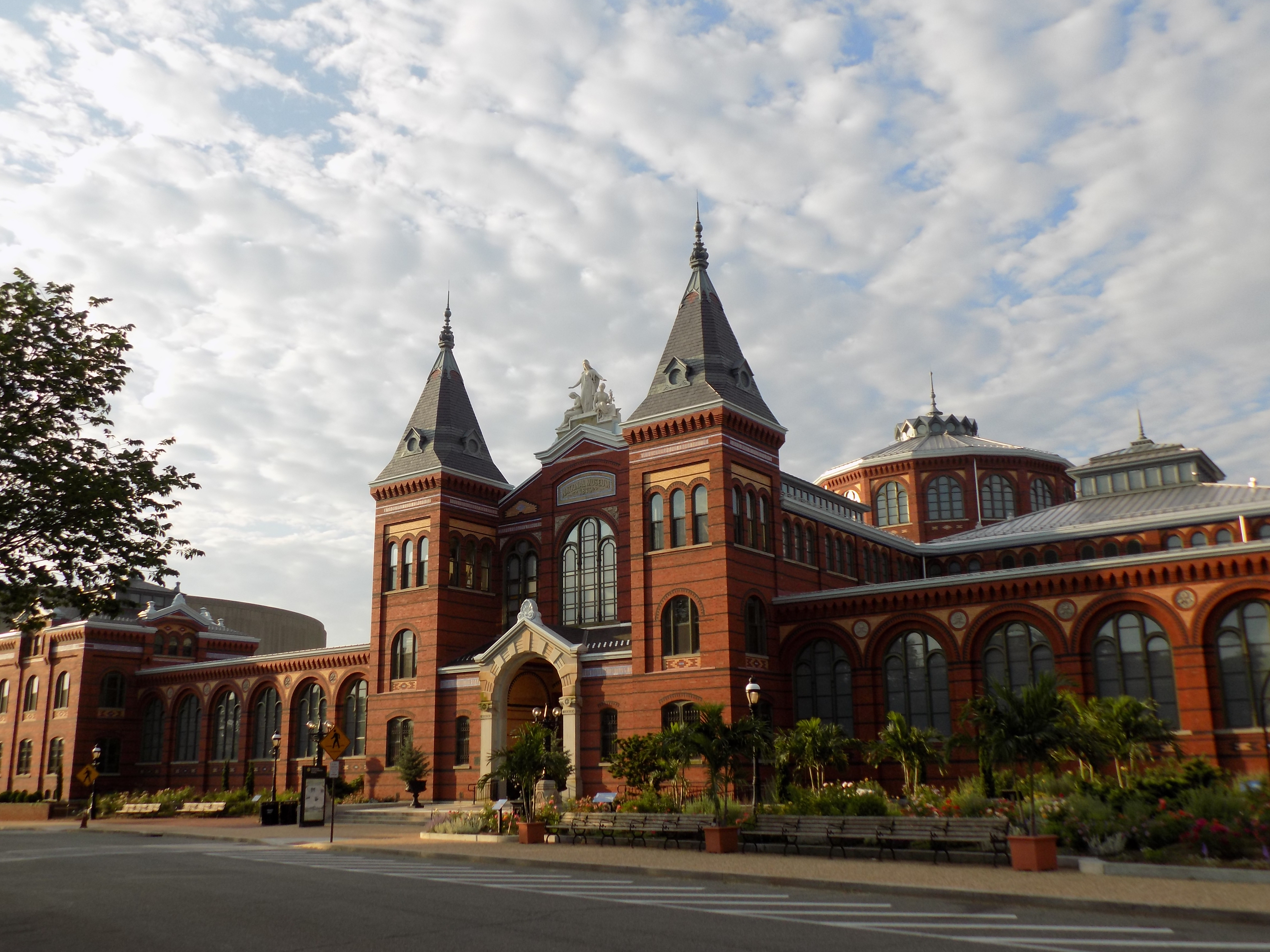

- Location within Central Washington, D.C. Location within the District of Columbia Location within the United States
- Former name: United States National Museum
- Established: 1879; 147 years ago
- Location: 900 Jefferson Drive SW, Washington, D.C.
- Coordinates: 38°53′18″N 77°1′28″W
- Director: Rachel Goslins
- Website: aib.si.edu
- Arts and Industries Building
- U.S. National Register of Historic Places
- U.S. National Historic Landmark
- D.C. Inventory of Historic Sites
- Built: 1881; 145 years ago
- Architect: Cluss & Schulze; Meigs, Montgomery
- Architectural style: Renaissance Revival
- NRHP reference No.: 71000994

Significant dates
- Added to NRHP: November 11, 1971
- Designated NHL: November 11, 1971
- Designated DCIHS: November 8, 1964

The Arts and Industries Building is the second oldest (after The Castle) of the Smithsonian museums on the National Mall in Washington, D.C. Initially named the National Museum, it was built to provide the Smithsonian with its first proper facility for public display of its growing collections. The building, designed by architects Adolf Cluss and Paul Schulze, opened in 1881, hosting an inaugural ball for President James A. Garfield. It was designated a National Historic Landmark in 1971. After being closed since 2004 for repair and renovation, the building reopened in 2021 with a special exhibition, Futures. In August of 2026, the Smithsonian Board of Regents voted to set the building as the permanent site of the National Museum of the American Latino.

== Description ==
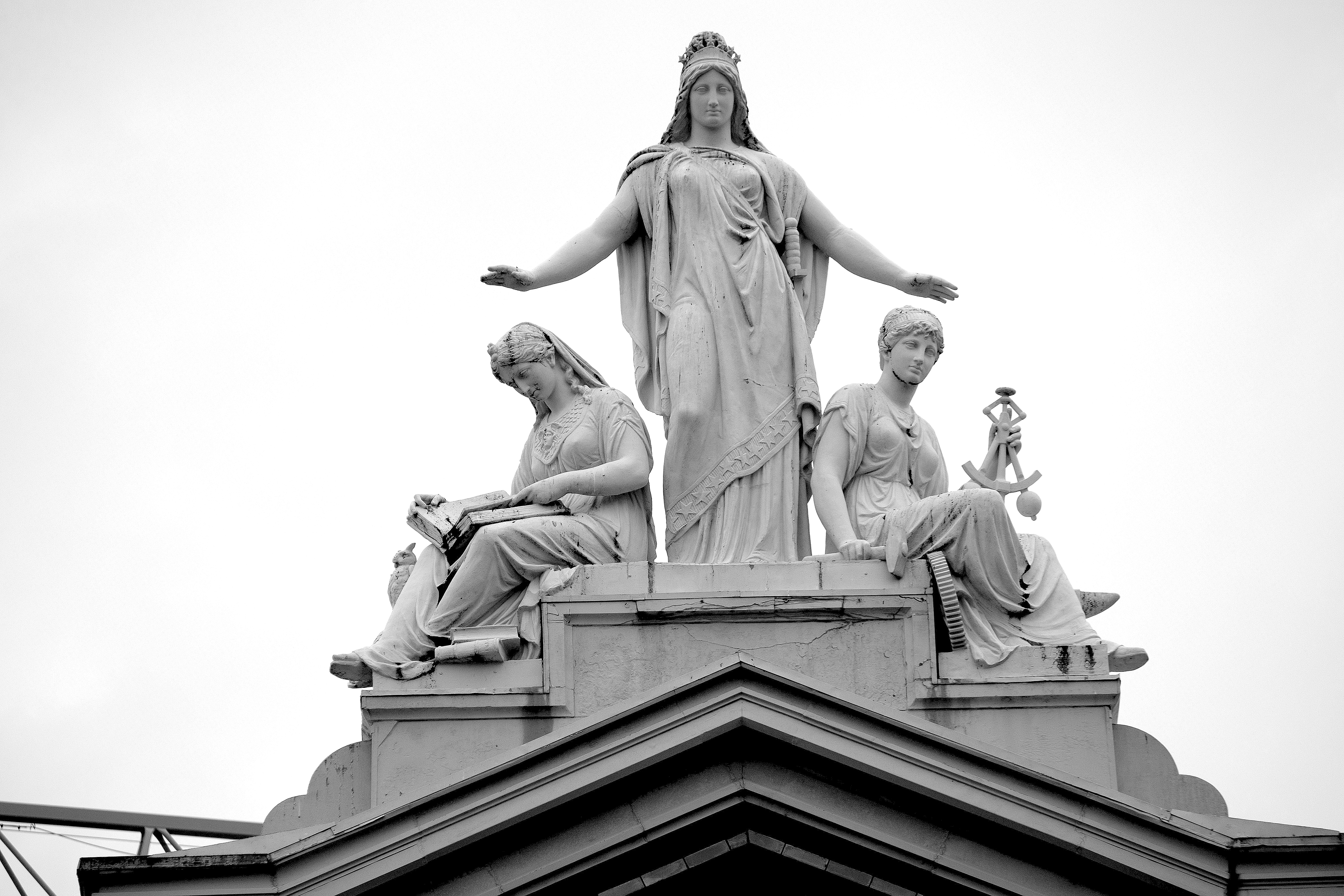
Columbia Protecting Science and Industry by sculptor Caspar Buberl.

The Arts and Industries Building was sited slightly farther back from the Mall than the Smithsonian Castle to avoid obscuring the view of the Castle from the Capitol. The building was designed to be symmetrical, composed of a Greek cross with a central rotunda. The exterior was constructed with geometric patterns of polychrome brick, and a sculpture entitled Columbia Protecting Science and Industry by sculptor Caspar Buberl was placed above the main entrance on the north side.

The interior of the building was partially lit through the use of skylights and clerestory windows. An iron truss roof covers the building. In 1883, the exterior was adjusted to use a more vibrant maroon-colored brick.

The building is composed of four pavilions, one at each corner, about 40 feet (12 m) square and three stories tall. These surround a central rotunda. Lower sections or "ranges" were placed outside the pavilions. Pervasive complaints of dampness and the poor health of the building's occupants led to the replacement of the wood floors in the 1890s. Balconies were added in 1896–1902 to increase space after a new Smithsonian Building failed to be authorized by the United States Congress. A tunnel was constructed in 1901 to the Smithsonian Institution Building next door.

== History ==
=== 19th century ===
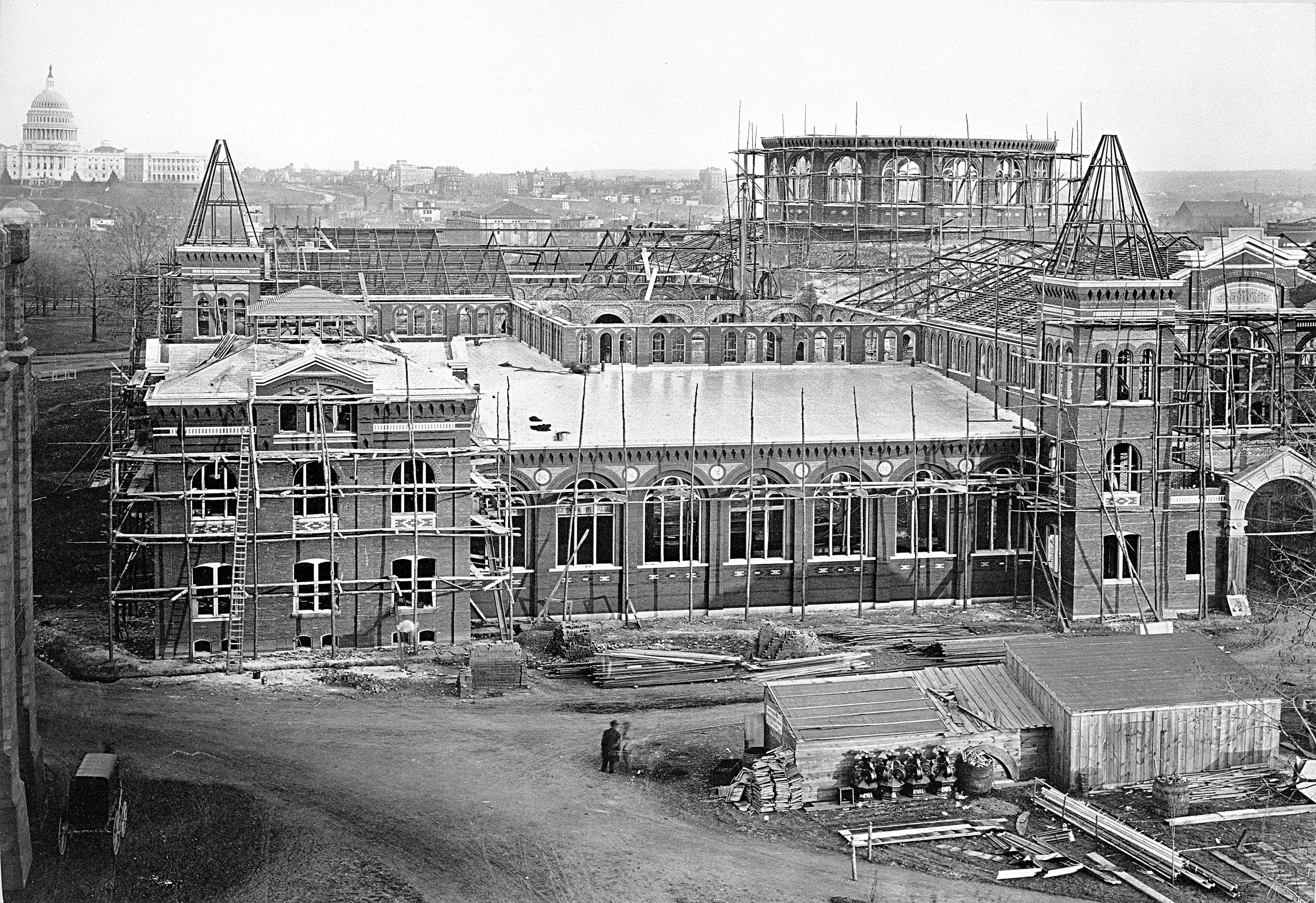
Construction of the Arts and Industries Building in 1879

According to the Smithsonian Archives, "the Congressional appropriation for the 1876 Philadelphia Centennial Exposition contained an interesting proviso. It stated that the appropriation was considered a loan, and if income from the exhibition allowed the loan to be repaid, Congress would then allow part of those funds to be used to construct a new building for the National Museum."

The success of the exhibits allowed the loan to be paid off soon after the event. As promised, then, a bill was introduced in Congress two years later by the Board of Regents of the Smithsonian to build a suitable structure. The bill included plans developed by General Montgomery C. Meigs, which were based on the Government Building by James Windrim at the Philadelphia Centennial Exposition, which was itself inspired by structures at the 1873 Vienna Exposition. Funds were approved in 1879 and the design was executed by Cluss and Schulze, based on the Meigs plan.

During its construction, the materials featured at the Philadelphia Centennial Exposition—up to "sixty box cars worth" of donations—were too numerous to fit in the Smithsonian Institution Building and so were temporarily stored in the District Armory Building at the corner of 7th Street SW and Independence Avenue.

According to the aforementioned Smithsonian Archives, "the first event to take place in the new National Museum Building was the Inaugural Ball for President James Garfield and Vice President Chester A. Arthur on March 4, 1881. A temporary wooden floor was laid, two electric lights were placed in the Rotunda, 10,000 bins for hats and coats were erected, 3,000 gas lights were installed, and festive buntings, state flags and seals decorated the halls. A colossal "Statue of America" stood in the Rotundia, illustrative of peace, justice and liberty, grasping in her uplifted hand an electric light "indicative of the skill, genius, progress, and civilization" of America in the 19th century."

Eight months later the museum officially opened to the public. "It contained 80,000 square feet of exhibit space with specially designed mahogany exhibit cases. The exhibit halls contained exhibits on geology, metallurgy, zoology, medicine, anthropology, art, history and technologies such as ceramics, printing, transportation, textiles, fisheries, and agriculture." Under the guidance of George Brown Goode, a historian and ichythyologist, a Division of Arts and Industries and Materia Medica was established that same year and materials from the museum were sent to many late nineteenth century expositions to teach people about the country's political and natural history.

=== 20th century ===
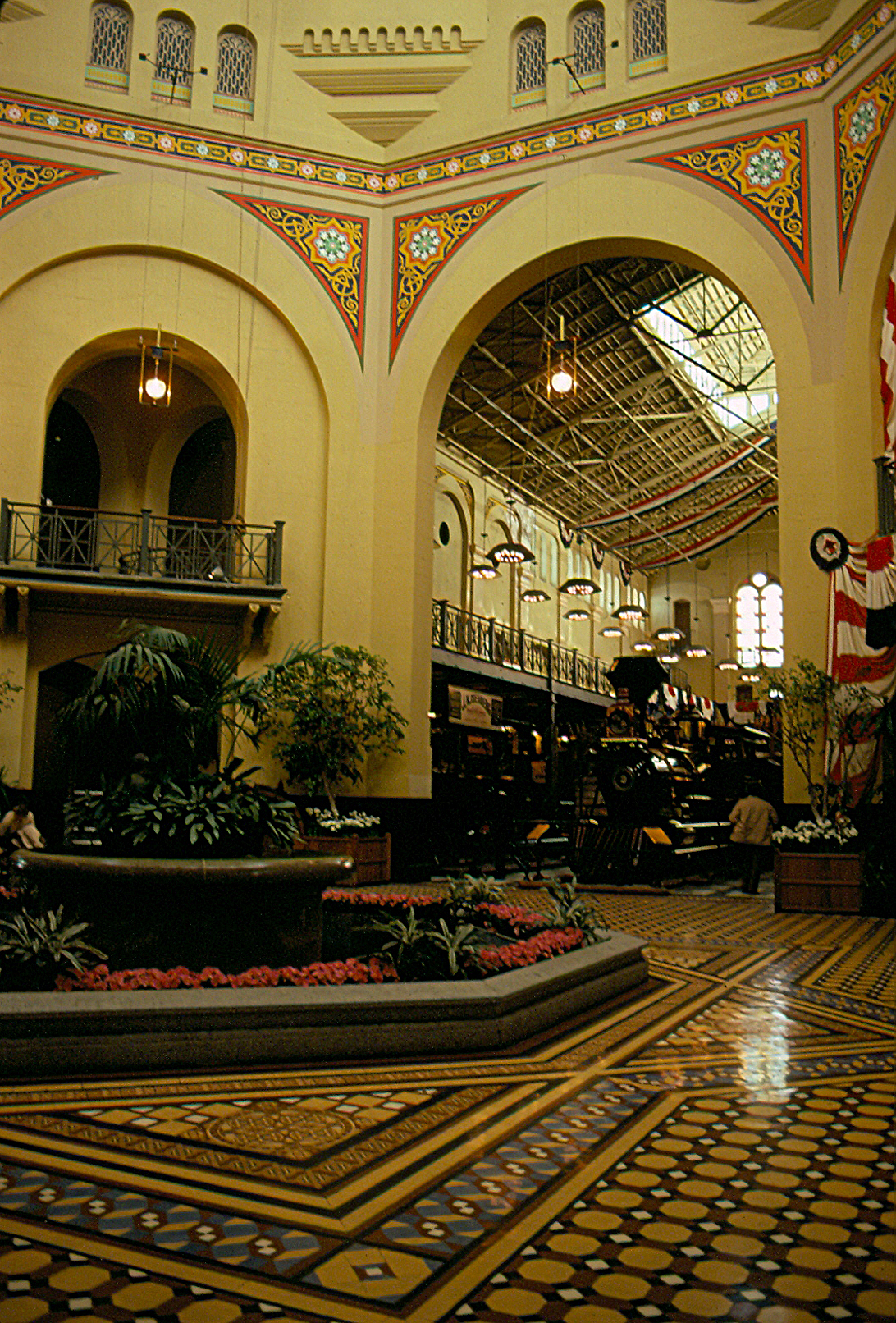
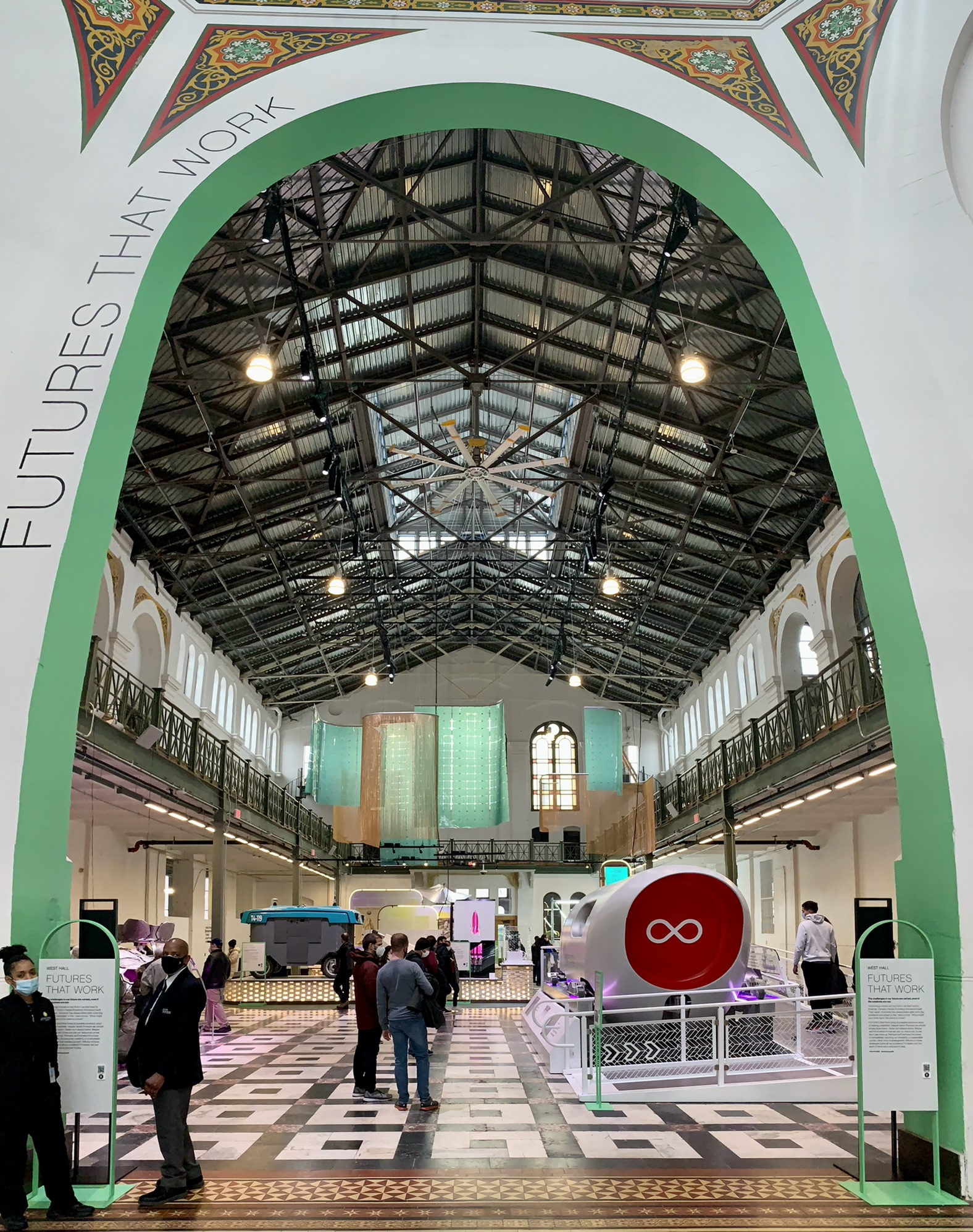
Interior of the Arts and Industries Building in 1982 and 2022

In 1910, the natural history collections were moved to the new National Museum of Natural History, and the old National Museum Building was renamed the Arts and Industries Building.

In 1964 additional exhibitions were moved to the National Museum of History and Technology, now known as the National Museum of American History.

In the middle of 1975, the building was closed to the public to begin moving its remaining exhibits to the newly constructed National Air and Space Museum. Restoration work was performed over the next year at a cost of $4.5 million, including the installation of air conditioning.

In May 1976, the Arts and Industries Building reopened with 1876: A Centennial Exhibition, featuring the Philadelphia Exposition artifacts it was originally built to house. Added later were series of temporary exhibitions and a children's theater, known as the Discovery Theater.

=== 21st century ===
By 1995, the building was reported to be in disrepair and at risk of closing down. By 2000, plastic tarps were in place to protect visitors from debris from the crumbling roof. In 2004, the building was closed to the public indefinitely, as funding for the necessary repairs was uncertain.

The building's uncertain future and deteriorating condition led the National Trust for Historic Preservation to name it in 2006 as one of America's Most Endangered Places, an annual list of endangered historic sites. In 2009 it was scheduled to receive $25 million in funds from the American Recovery and Reinvestment Act of 2009 for renovation work.

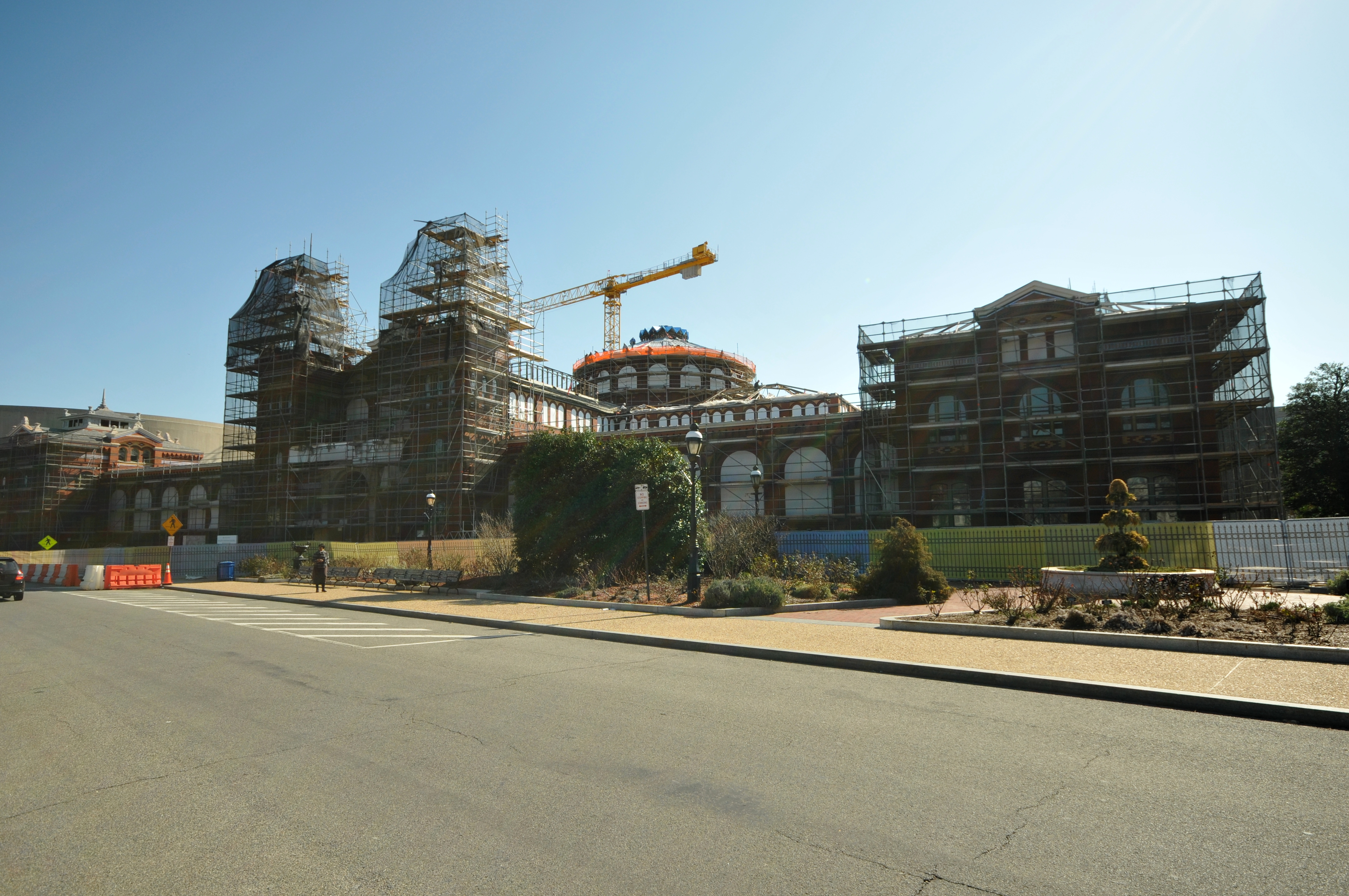
Renovation of the Arts and Industries Building in 2012

Revitalization of the shell alone was solicited in 2010. A complete restoration was projected to cost $200 million ($65 million in structural renovations alone) and last until 2014. In January 2014, the Smithsonian announced that the building would remain closed for the foreseeable future, citing funding concerns. But on April 12, 2015, Smithsonian Acting Secretary Albert Horvath said about 40 percent of the building would reopen in fall 2015 for use as a short-term exhibit space. Smithsonian officials said that the building had been architecturally stabilized, and minor refurbishments made to the bathrooms, HVAC system, and interior paint scheme. Horvath said the building would not completely reopen and its fate had not yet been clarified or determined.

After 2015, the building was used occasionally for special events, such as the Smithsonian Folklife Festival. The Arts and Industries Building reopened in November 2021 for its first exhibition since 2004, Futures, scheduled to run through July 2022. Afterward, the building is scheduled to be closed for significant renovations, which would allow it to be permanently reopened as early as 2028. The building was evaluated as a possible home for the National Museum of the American Latino or the Smithsonian American Women's History Museum.

The building has hosted a number of exhibitions and artists in residence, such as Catie Cuan, a Futurist-in-Residence who performed at the closing ceremonies of the Futures exhibit on July 6, 2022.

In August of 2026, the Smithsonian Board of Regents voted to set the building as the permanent site of the National Museum of the American Latino.

== See also ==
- List of National Historic Landmarks in Washington, D.C.
- National Register of Historic Places listings in central Washington, D.C.
- Architecture of Washington, D.C.
