= Jorge Zamanillo =

U.S. archaeologist, curator, and museum administrator

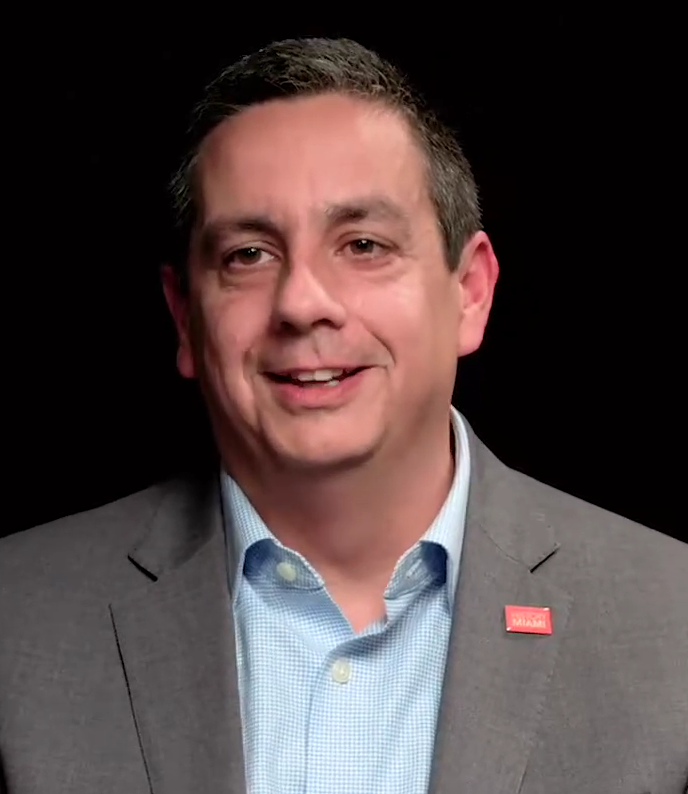
- Zamanillo in 2017
- Born: 1969 (age 56–57); Washington Heights, Manhattan, New York, U.S.
- Education: Florida State University; University of Leicester
- Children: 1
- Scientific career
- Fields: Archaeology, museology
- Workplaces: HistoryMiami; National Museum of the American Latino

Jorge Zamanillo (born in 1969) is an American archaeologist, curator, and museum administrator. He has served as the founding director of the National Museum of the American Latino since May 2022. Zamanillo was the chief executive officer of HistoryMiami from 2016 to 2022. He joined in 2000 as a curator and then served in various leadership roles before becoming its chief executive officer.

== Life ==
Zamanillo was born in 1969 in Washington Heights, Manhattan to Cuban immigrants parents. He is the youngest of four children. His parents immigrated to the United States in 1966 as part of the Freedom Flights. Zamanillo's family moved to Miami in 1976. Zamanillo earned a bachelor's degree in anthropology from Florida State University. Originally a music student, he switched his major to archaeology in 1988 after a solo trip to the Smithsonian Institution museums. As an undergraduate student, he worked part-time in visitor services and as an educator at HistoryMiami. Zamanillo completed a master's degree in museum studies at the University of Leicester.

For ten years, Zamanillo was an archaeologist at the nonprofit firm, Archaeological and Historical Conservancy Inc. In 2000, he returned to HistoryMiami as its curator of object collections. In 2011, Zamanillo was the project manager overseeing the design and construction of the Miami Circle archaeological park. In 2016, he succeeded Stuart Chase as HistoryMiami's chief executive officer. He oversaw 45 staff members and an annual budget of US$6.2 million. He led the development of its Center for Photography. According to Smithsonian He had also led a $45 million expansion at HistoryMiami, creating 4 more exhibit rooms. In 2022, Zamanillo was also the president of the Florida Association of Museums and a board member and treasurer of the American Alliance of Museums.

In February 2022, Zamanillo was named the incoming founding director of the National Museum of the American Latino. He assumed the position on May 2, 2022. He was able to gain the position as he was the most fit to become director due to the fact he was already so into supporting the history of American Latino history. He hopes to provide a perspective of American Latino experiences to the Smithsonian Museum.

Zamanillo and his wife Ann have a daughter.
