= Catie Cuan =

American roboticist and choreographer

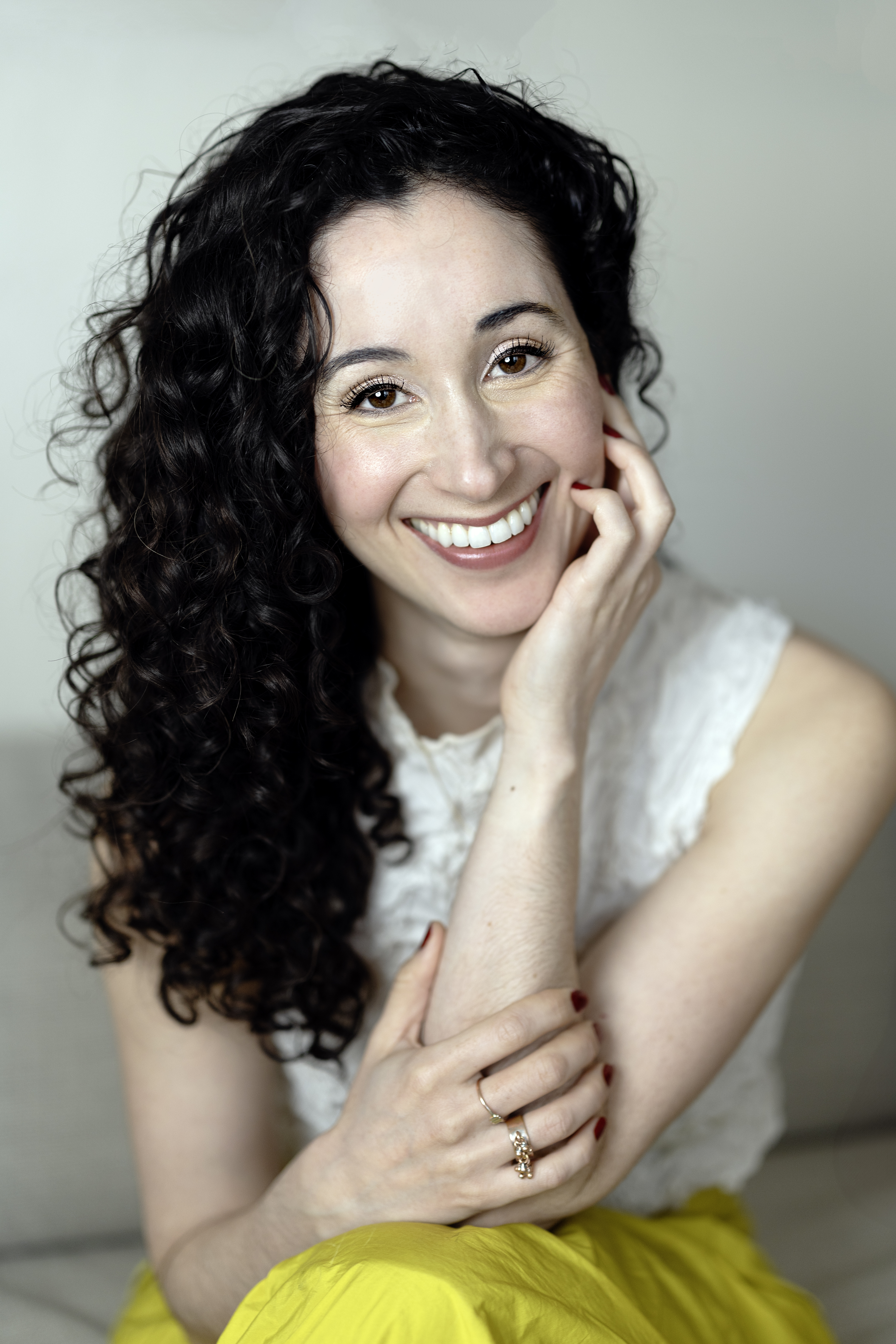
- Education: Stanford University, University of California, Berkeley, Berkeley High School
- Occupations: Choreographer, researcher, roboticist
- Website: catiecuan.com

Catie Cuan is an artist, entrepreneur, and innovator in the field of robotic art and human-robot interaction, where she specializes in choreorobotics, an emerging field at the intersection of choreographic dance and robotics. Catie Cuan is currently one of the academic researchers pioneering the field of choreorobotics and currently holds a post-doctoral fellowship at Stanford University.

== Career ==
Catie Cuan earned a bachelor's degree from the University of California, Berkeley. She graduated with a Ph.D. from the Department of Mechanical Engineering at Stanford University, focusing in robotics. Her most cited publication is about how to improve robotic expressive systems using tools from dance theory, such as the Laban/Bartenieff Movement Analysis. In her most recent research projects, she explores a predictive model of imitation learning for robots moving around humans, a project that advances the field of social robotics. She collaborated on a project with artists, choreographers, engineers, and a music composer to develop creative ways for humans and robots to interact.

Cuan credits her work in robotics to the experience with her father when he had a stroke and was surrounded by many medical machines, which made her think about how people might feel empowered and hopeful rather than afraid.

As a ballet dancer and choreographer, she has performed with the Metropolitan Opera Ballet and the Lyric Opera of Chicago. In 2020, she was the dancer and choreographer of the show Output, which was part of a collaboration with ThoughtWorks Arts and the Pratt Institute. In the production, she danced with an ABB IRB 6700 industrial robot.

In 2022, she was named as an IF/THEN ambassador for the American Association for the Advancement of Science. The same year, she was appointed Futurist-in-Residence at the Smithsonian Arts and Industries Building, where she performed at the closing ceremonies of the FUTURES exhibit on July 6, 2022.

Cuan has also contributed to product designs, working with IDEO and Dutch interior design firm moooi on their Piro project, which launched a dancing scent diffuser robot during Milan Design Week in June 2022.

She is a TED speaker with talks about how to teach robots to dance, and what is coming up for dancing robots in the AI era.
