= Crystal R. Emery =

American filmmaker and playwright (1961–2026)

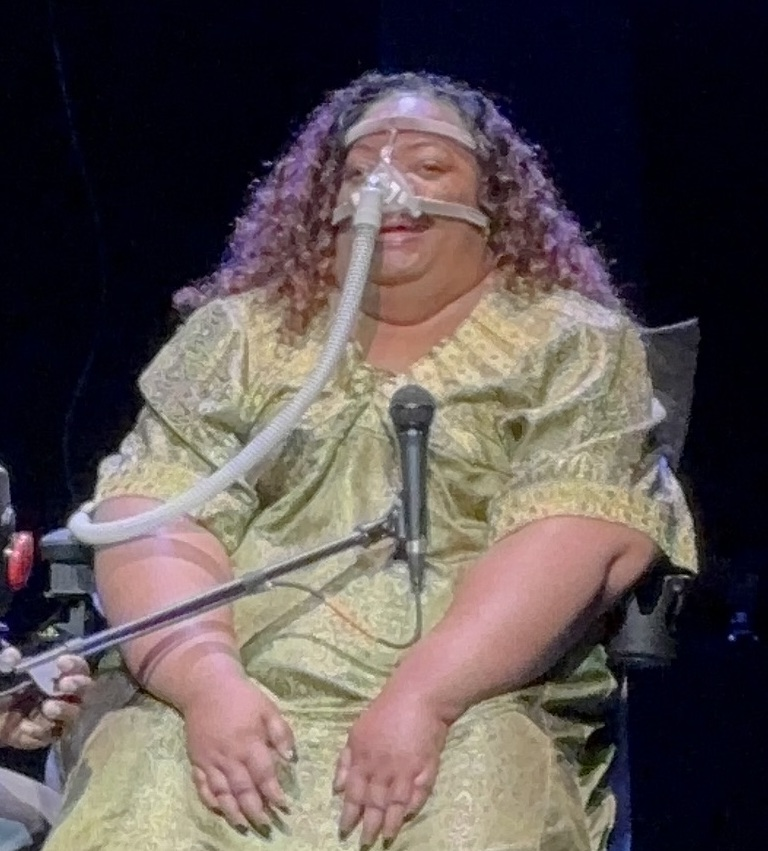
- Emery in 2025
- Born: Crystal Renee Emery; February 25, 1961; New Haven, Connecticut, U.S.
- Died: May 5, 2026 (aged 65); New Haven, Connecticut, U.S.
- Other name: Crystal Emery-Kerr
- Education: University of Connecticut; The New School
- Occupations: Filmmaker, playwright, theatre director
- Years active: c. 1985–2025
- Spouse: Michael Kerr (m. 1991)

Crystal Renee Emery (February 25, 1961 – May 5, 2026) was an American filmmaker, playwright, theatre director and founder and CEO of URU The Right To Be, Inc., a nonprofit content production company. She also was featured in the Smithsonian's #IfThenSheCan – The Exhibit, a collection of life-sized 3D-printed statues of role models in STEM. As a filmmaker, she was known for directing the 2010 documentary The Deadliest Disease in America.

== Early life and education ==
Crystal Renee Emery was born on February 25, 1961 in the Brookside neighborhood of New Haven, Connecticut. Her parents were Shelly Emery Holness and Robert Emery Sr. She had twelve siblings. She became interested in filmmaking at a young age. During her childhood, she started directing plays with her brothers and she wrote her first play about Harriet Tubman's work to free people who were enslaved.

Emery earned a bachelor's degree from the University of Connecticut in 1985. She returned to the East Coast to New York City and then moved to New York City and earned an M.A. in media studies from The New School of Public Engagement.

== Career ==
Emery began directing plays while she was in college. After graduating, she worked as an apprentice in theater with Lloyd Richards and later as a production assistant for Bill Duke. She later worked with Suzanne de Passe during the filming of The Jacksons: An American Dream (1991–1992).

She directed multiple documentary films including The Deadliest Disease in America and Changing the Face of Medicine. In 2010, she began working on the documentary Black Women in Medicine in which she interviews seven black physicians and combines the interviews with historical videos from the 1950s and 1960s. The film was well-received, having a theatrical run in 2016 and later airing on public television. It was also screened internationally as part of the American Film Showcase. She later founded URU The Right To Be, Inc., a nonprofit content production company.

Her written works included Sweet Nez, the play A Way Out of No Way, and a book titled Against All Odds, which features 100 prominent Black women medical doctors. She worked on a virtual reality game called You Can't Be What You Can't See which allows players to step into a virtual reality world as a medical professional.

Emery was a member of the Producers Guild of America and New York Women in Film and Television. Emery also served as an If/Then Ambassador for the American Association for the Advancement of Science (AAAS), where she was featured in the Smithsonian's #IfThenSheCan – The Exhibit, a collection of life-sized 3D-printed statues of women in STEM.

In January 2025, Crystal launched her comedy career as an opener for Michelle Buteau at the Bellhouse Theatre in New York. She later began performing at Bregamos Community Theater in New Haven. Crystal's first self-published book, Without a Trace, was released in 2025.

== Personal life and death ==
While in college, Emery was diagnosed with a form of Charcot–Marie–Tooth disease, an incurable genetic disorder which can lead to quadriplegia and diabetes. She had been married to Michael Kerr for thirty-five years at the time of her death.

In 2018, she received an honorary doctorate of letters from the University of Connecticut.

Emery died at the Hospital of Saint Raphael in New Haven, on May 5, 2026 at the age of 65. Her widower announced her death six days later.
