= Ana Maria Porras =

American biomedical engineer

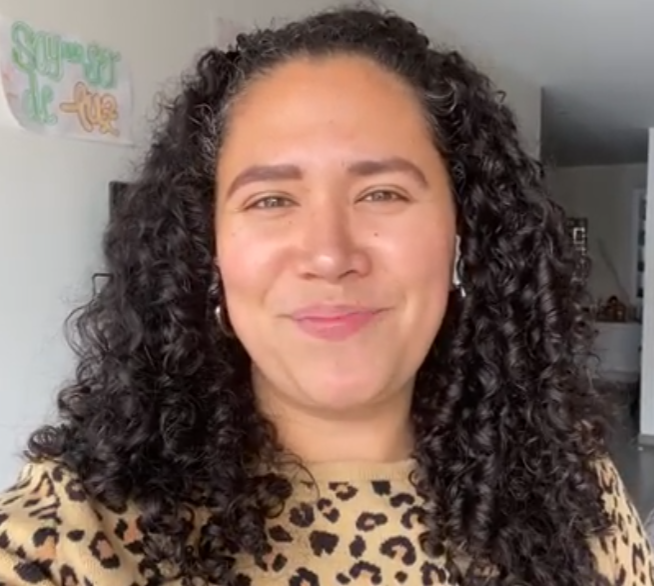
- In a 2021 video
- Born: Ana Maria Porras Corredor; Colombia
- Education: University of Texas; University of Wisconsin-Madison
- Occupation: Biomedical engineer

Ana Maria Porras Corredor is an Colombian biomedical engineer who is assistant professor of biomedical engineering at the University of Florida and an IF/THEN Ambassador for the American Association for the Advancement of Science. Porras has published academic research in the fields of human microbiome, tissue engineering, biomaterials, global health, and infectious disease. She is known for creating crochet versions of micro-organisms as a way of connecting with a wider audience, especially children in her home country of Colombia.

A 3-D printed statue of Porras holding several of her crochet creations was included in the IF/THEN exhibit at the Smithsonian Institution in Washington, D.C. in March 2022. She was named a UF International Center Global Fellow in 2021, a Cornell Presidential Postdoctoral Fellow, 2019–2022 and an American Heart Association Predoctoral Fellow, 2015–2016. She co-founded the LatinX in Biomedical Engineering (LatinXinBME) community with Brian Aguado, a professor of bioengineering at the University of California San Diego. Porras was quoted in a 2021 BBC article on the gender differences in the use of professional titles.

== Early life and education ==
Porras was born in Colombia, and her parents were engineering professors. Porras earned a Bachelor of Science in Biomedical Engineering from University of Texas in 2011, a Masters of Science in Biomedical Engineering from the University of Wisconsin-Madison in 2013 and a Ph.D. in Biomedical Engineering from the University of Wisconsin-Madison in 2016.
