= Sylvie Garneau-Tsodikova =

French Canadian chemist

- Education: Université Laval; University of Alberta
- Scientific career
- Workplaces: Harvard Medical School; University of Michigan; University of Kentucky
- Thesis: New antimicrobial agents acting on bacterial cell walls. (2003)

Sylvie Garneau-Tsodikova is a French Canadian-American chemist who is a Professor and Associate Vice President for Research at the University of Kentucky. One of the areas of her research interest is the development of new molecules to combat bacterial and fungal resistance.

== Early life and education ==
Garneau-Tsodikova was born in Quebec City, Canada. She attended the Université Laval for her undergraduate studies in chemistry, where she graduated top of the class. As a student, she was honoured with several awards, including distinguishments from the Chemical Institute of Canada and Natural Sciences and Engineering Research Council. She completed a Master's thesis on the synthesis of glutamyl transfer RNA synthetase inhibitors. She moved to the University of Alberta for graduate studies, where she worked on the impact of antimicrobial agents of bacterial cell walls. During her doctoral studies she became interested in infectious diseases and the development of antibacterial agents.

== Research and career ==
Garneau-Tsodikova moved to the Harvard Medical School for her postdoctoral training where she worked with Christopher T. Walsh on the formation and modification of dipyrroles. At Harvard she was trained in both enzymology and biochemistry. In 2006, Garneau-Tsodikova moved to the University of Michigan, where she was an Assistant Professor of Medicinal Chemistry. She spent seven years at Michigan, until she moved to the University of Kentucky. She was promoted to Professor and Assistant Dean in 2018.

Garneau-Tsodikova's research focuses on the development of antifungal and antibacterial agents. In particular, Garneau-Tsodikova focused on drug resistance in tuberculosis and in fungal infections by Candida auris. She was also involved in the development of multifunctional enzymes with tunable biological properties. She served as an Associate Editor of the Royal Society of Chemistry journal MedChemComm, now called RSC Medicinal Chemistry.

== Selected publications ==
- Christopher T Walsh; Sylvie Garneau-Tsodikova; Gregory J Gatto (1 December 2005). "Protein posttranslational modifications: the chemistry of proteome diversifications". Angewandte Chemie International Edition. 44 (45): 7342–7372. doi:10.1002/anie.200501023. ISSN 1433-7851. PMID 16267872. Wikidata Q34465021.
- Frédéric H Vaillancourt; Ellen Yeh; David A Vosburg; Sylvie Garneau-Tsodikova; Christopher T Walsh (1 August 2006). "Nature's inventory of halogenation catalysts: oxidative strategies predominate". Chemical Reviews. 106 (8): 3364–3378. doi:10.1021/cr050313i. ISSN 0009-2665. PMID 16895332. Wikidata Q34555225.
- Sylvie Garneau; Nathaniel I Martin; John C Vederas (1 May 2002). "Two-peptide bacteriocins produced by lactic acid bacteria". Biochimie. 84 (5–6): 577–592. doi:10.1016/s0300-9084(02)01414-1. ISSN 0300-9084. PMID 12423802. Wikidata Q34992720.
