= University of South Florida College of Public Health =

Graduate school in Tampa, Florida, US

- Type: Public
- Established: 1984
- Dean: Sten Vermund, MD, PhD
- Faculty: 170
- Administrative staff: 122
- Students: 1,251 for 2012-2013; 570 B.S., 430 MPH, MSPH, MHA; 99 Ph.D., DrPH, 152 Certificate Students
- Location: Tampa, Florida, USA
- Campus: Urban
- Colors: Green and Gold
- Nickname: Bulls
- Mascot: Rocky D. Bull
- Website: http://health.usf.edu/publichealth/

Opened in 1984, the University of South Florida College of Public Health, offers master's degrees in Public Health (MPH), a Master of Science in Public Health (MSPH) which is a more academic and research oriented master's degree, and a master's degree in Health Administration (MHA), along with a doctorate (PhD) in Public Health and several dual degrees in collaboration with other colleges- most notably the dual PhD/MPH program in Applied Anthropology. The MHA in Public Health Practice is a program for health professionals which can be attained through weekend executive or distance learning format.

The college offers classes at the north Tampa, Florida campus and at satellite locations throughout Florida. Using the Internet, the Distance Learning Program gives students anywhere in Florida, at the Centers for Disease Control and Prevention in Atlanta, Georgia and in Belize the opportunity to complete selected courses or earn the MPH degree in Public Health Practice.

== Academics ==
University of South Florida College of Public Health, along with the University of Florida and FIU are the only public health colleges in Florida accredited by the Council on Education for Public Health. It has 5 main departments:

- The Community and Family Health Department offers degrees in Maternal and Child Health, Public Health Education, Behavioral Health, Socio-Health Sciences, and Community and Family Health.
- The Environmental and Occupational Health Department offers degrees in Environmental Health, Toxicology and Risk Assessment, Safety Management, Industrial Hygiene, and Occupational Health.
- The Epidemiology and Biostatistics Department offers degrees in Epidemiology and Biostatistics along with combined degrees in Epidemiology and Biostatistics as well as Epidemiology and Global Health.
- The Global Health Department offers degrees in Global Communicable Disease, Global Disaster Management & Humanitarian Relief, Global Health Practice, and a combined degree in Epidemiology and Global Health.
- The Health Policy and Management offers degrees in Health Policy and Management, Health Administration, Health Care Organization and Management, Public Health Administration, and Health Policies and Programs.
- The school also offers college wide degrees in Public Health Practices and Masters International Peace Corps Program.

== Research ==
The college's population-based research helps to promote health and prevent disease across the life span in Florida and the global community. The college's research centers include the following:

- Center for Biological Defense
- Global Center for Disaster Management and Humanitarian Action
- The Florida Prevention Research Center
- Harrell Center for the Study of Family Violence
- Center for Positive Health
- Center for Leadership in Public Health Practice
- Sunshine Education and Research Center
- Center for Health, HIV/AIDS Research and Training in India (CHART)
- Lawton and Rhea Chiles Center for Healthy Mothers and Babies
- OSHA Training Institute Education Center

== Online Programs ==
The College of Public Health offers a variety of graduate degrees and certificate programs in an online format to suit the needs of the off-campus student. All online degree and certificate programs are designed by program faculty who work with instructional designers in the college's office of Educational Technology and Assessment (ETA). Each year ETA supports over 5000 student enrollments in graduate and undergraduate online public health courses.

Master of Public Health (MPH) Degree Programs

- MPH with a Concentration in Public Health Practice
- MPH with a Concentration in Public Health Administration
- MPH with a Concentration in Global Disaster Management and Humanitarian Relief
- MPH with a Concentration in Epidemiology
- MPH with a Concentration in Infection Control (online) – admitting students Fall 2013
- MPH with a Concentration in Health, Safety & Environment (online) – admitting students Spring 2013

Graduate Certificates

- Public Health Generalist
- Concepts and Tools Of Epidemiology
- Disaster Management
- Humanitarian Assistance
- Infection Control
- Maternal and Child Health Epidemiology
- Public Health Policy and Programs
- Social Marketing
- Applied Biostatistics
- Epidemiology of Infectious Diseases

== Hinks & Elaine Shimberg Health Science Library ==
Founded in 1971, the Hinks & Elaine Shimberg Health Science Library serves the University of South Florida College of Medicine, the University of South Florida College of Nursing, and the University of South Florida College of Public Health.
