= Jaye Gardiner =

American cancer researcher

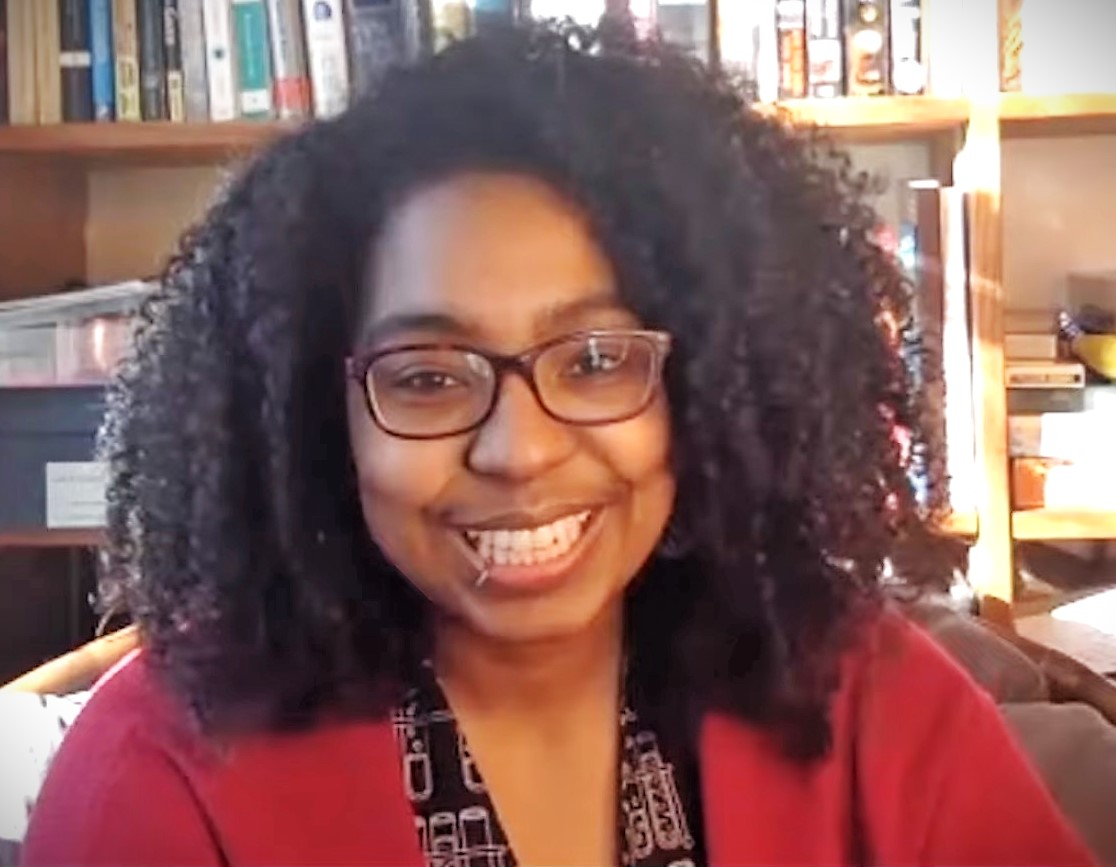
- Gardiner in 2021
- Born: Jaye Cassandra Gardiner
- Education: University of Wisconsin-Madison; Macalester College
- Scientific career
- Workplaces: Fox Chase Cancer Center
- Thesis: Pushing the Envelope: How HIV Regulates Dual Roles for Viral ENV Glycoproteins in Cell-Cell Adhesion and Membrane Fusion (2017)
- Doctoral advisor: Nathan M. Sherer
- Other academic advisors: Edna Cukierman
- Website: www.jayegardiner.com

Jaye Cassandra Gardiner is an American cancer researcher and assistant professor of biology at Tufts University. Her research considers the microenvironment that surrounds tumors, with a particular focus on pancreatic ductal adenocarcinoma. In 2022, she was the inaugural awardee of the Black in Cancer Postdoctoral Fellowship.

== Early life and education ==
Gardiner is a first generation American. She was a doctoral researcher at the University of Wisconsin–Madison, where she worked on HIV cell-to-cell transmission. She studied how the cytoplasmic tail of the envelope was involved with forming the virological synapse.

== Research and career ==
Gardiner was a postdoctoral fellow at the Fox Chase Cancer Center, where she worked with Edna Cukierman. Her research considers the microenvironment that surrounds tumors, with a particular focus on pancreatic ductal adenocarcinoma. Pancreatic ductal adenocarcinoma has a survival rate of 10% and is one of the leading causes of cancer-related deaths. She believes that these microenivronments are critical to identify new diagnostic and therapeutic tools.

Gardiner founded JKX Comics, a project that looks to improve science literacy amongst young people. She is committed to improving diversity in science and engineering. She was appointed to the American Association for the Advancement of Science IF/THEN Ambassador, which looks to promote women scientists.

=== Awards and honors ===
- 2021 Black in Cancer Postdoctoral Fellowship
- 2021 AAAS IF/THEN Ambassador
- 2022 American Society for Cell Biology Merton Bernfield Memorial Award

=== Selected publications ===
- Cassie M Jarvis; Daniel B Zwick; Joseph C Grim; et al. (3 July 2019). "Antigen structure affects cellular routing through DC-SIGN". Proceedings of the National Academy of Sciences of the United States of America. 116 (30): 14862–14867. Bibcode:2019PNAS..11614862J. doi:10.1073/pnas.1820165116. ISSN 0027-8424. PMC 6660738. PMID 31270240. Wikidata Q91593363.
- Kelly Watters; Bahar Inankur; Jaye C Gardiner; Jay Warrick; Nathan M Sherer; John Yin; Ann C Palmenberg (8 February 2017). "Differential Disruption of Nucleocytoplasmic Trafficking Pathways by Rhinovirus 2A Proteases". Journal of Virology. 91 (8). doi:10.1128/jvi.02472-16. ISSN 0022-538X. PMC 5375692. PMID 28179529. Wikidata Q40339493.
- Jaye C Gardiner; Eric J Mauer; Nathan M Sherer (11 May 2016). "HIV-1 Gag, Envelope, and Extracellular Determinants Cooperate To Regulate the Stability and Turnover of Virological Synapses". Journal of Virology. 90 (14): 6583–6597. doi:10.1128/jvi.00600-16. ISSN 0022-538X. PMC 4936141. PMID 27170746. Wikidata Q30781846.
