= Allison Fundis =

Allison Fundis is a marine geologist, ocean explorer and chief operating officer for the Ocean Exploration Trust. She has led or participated in over 50 expeditions at sea across the world, and in 2021 was named as an Emerging Explorer by the National Geographic Society.

== Early life and education ==
Fundis holds a MS in Marine Geology from the University of Florida and a BA in Human Ecology from the College of the Atlantic. Prior to earning her master's degree, Fundis was a high school chemistry and biology teacher at the University School of Nashville in Tennessee.

== Career ==
In 2010, Fundis worked for the National Science Foundation-funded Ocean Observatories Initiative at the University of Washington. During this time, she helped plan and install the largest cabled seafloor observatory in the US.

Fundis joined the Ocean Exploration Trust in 2013 and currently acts as the chief operating officer. Alongside a team of scientists, educators and engineers, Fundis leads annual missions aboard the trust's exploration vessel Nautilus. The vessel's telepresence systems enable expeditions to be live-streamed so as to engage the public and the scientific community.

In 2019, Fundis co-led a three-week expedition with Robert Ballard to solve the mystery of Amelia Earhart's disappearance. A common theory posits that Earhart crash-landed on Nikumaroro Island in the Pacific Ocean. In response, Fundis and her team conducted an exhaustive search for any evidence of a plane in the water surrounding the island. Although no such evidence was found, the complete exploration of this area was an important step in furthering the conclusion of this mystery.

== Awards ==
Fundis was recognized in 2019 as an Innovation & Technology delegate for the Academy of Achievement and as an IF/THEN ambassador by the American Association for the Advancement of Science. In 2020, she was induced as a Fellow National of the Explorers Club and is a member of National Geographic Society's 2021 class of Emerging Explorers.
