= Anamita Guha =

Anamita Guha is a quantum computing and AI expert. She currently works as a product manager at Meta Platforms (formerly Facebook). She is an If/Then ambassador and was featured in the Smithsonian's "#IfThenSheCan - The Exhibit", a collection of life-sized 3D-printed statues of role models in STEM.

== Early life and education ==
Guha was born in India and immigrated with her family to Kansas when she was 2 years old. At age 3 her family moved to the San Francisco Bay Area. She had early exposure to computers and began designing websites as a side hustle by age 9. Guha majored in Cognitive Science at University of California, Berkeley.

== Career ==
She previously worked as Global Lead of Product Management at IBM Quantum and as a Lead Product Manager at IBM Watson.

At Meta, Guha uses artificial intelligence to improve user experience and protect user data.

Guha was featured in the Make That Change campaign for the nonprofit Girls Who Code.

She was named one of the top 25 software product executives of 2020.

== Personal life ==
Guha resides in New York, New York.
