= Adjunct professors in North America =

In North America, an adjunct professor, also known as an adjunct lecturer or adjunct instructor (collectively, adjunct faculty), is a professor who teaches on a limited-term contract, often for one semester at a time, and who is ineligible for tenure.

== Increase in adjunct labor ==
Colleges and universities began to employ greater numbers of non-tenure-track faculty in the 1970s. In 1975, adjuncts represented roughly 24% of instructional staff at degree-granting institutions, whereas in 2011 they represented over 40% of instructional staff.

Various explanations have been given for this shift. Some "trace the practice of hiring part-time instructors to a time when most schools didn’t allow women as full professors, and thus adjunct positions were associated with female instructors from the start." Many non-tenure-track faculty were married to full-time, tenure-track professors, and known as "the housewives of higher education." The majority of non-tenure-track professors are still women.

Some have argued that the increase in the use of non-tenured faculty is the result of “financial pressures, administrators’ desire for more flexibility in hiring, firing and changing course offerings, and the growth of community colleges and regional public universities focused on teaching basics and preparing students for jobs.” Others have argued that universities hire non-tenure-track faculty to "offset ... administrative bloat with cheaper labor" to the detriment of students: "while college tuition surged from 2003 to 2013 by 94 percent at public institutions and 74 percent at private, nonprofit schools, and student debt has climbed to over $1.2 trillion, much of that money has been going to ensure higher pay for a burgeoning legion of bureaucrats."

Paying some instructors less than others for the same teaching duties may be illegal.

== Compensation and academic use ==
In past decades, adjunct faculty helped universities and colleges expand the range of their course offerings to prospective and existing students. In this respect, adjuncts can also be used to inform the predominantly theoretical, and therefore somewhat limited, focus of full-time academics with the more pragmatic perspective of those who actually practice a given discipline in business, government or nonprofit organizations, akin to a professor of practice. For instance, as of the early 1990s Marvin Kaye, a prolific fiction author, editor and anthologist, also worked as part-time adjunct faculty of creative writing at New York University Another example is Edward H. Shortliffe, a pioneer in medical informatics, who was an adjunct faculty member at Columbia College of Physicians and Surgeons circa 2011. Marilyn Milian, a retired Florida judge and star of The People's Court, taught litigation skills as an adjunct faculty at the University of Miami as of 2013; and musician Wayne Horvitz has worked as adjunct faculty teaching composition at Cornish College of the Arts.

Since the 1980s, however, colleges and universities have increasingly utilized adjunct labor, whether full-time or part-time, simply to save money, giving them core undergraduate courses to teach (e.g., introductory math, or freshman-level English composition).

Though adjuncts hold at least a master's degree, if not a PhD, the salary for these positions is relatively low. Many adjuncts must work at several schools at once in order to earn a living in academia. Non-tenure-track faculty earn much less than tenure-track professors; median pay per course is $2,700 and average yearly pay is between $20,000 and $25,000. Adjunct pay in state and community colleges varies; however, it can be as little as US$1,400 for a 3-credit hour lecture-based course. At many private institutions on the East Coast, payment for a 3-credit hour course hovers around US$3,000–4,000, with average pay nationwide as of 2014 estimated at around US$2,000–3,000.

English professor William Pannapacker noted that adjunct faculty often earn less than minimum wage, when factoring in hours spent on classroom teaching, lesson preparation, office hours, grading of assignments, and other duties. 25% of adjuncts receive public assistance. According to the American Federation of Teachers, "nearly 25 percent of adjunct faculty members rely on public assistance, and 40 percent struggle to cover basic household expenses" and "just 15 percent of adjuncts said they are able to comfortably cover basic expenses from month to month."

Some adjunct faculty have remained with the same employer for as long as 25 years without receiving health insurance or retirement benefits. In 2014, Mary-Faith Cerasoli, a homeless female adjunct professor of Spanish and Italian, conducted a protest on the steps of the New York State Education Department Building.

Groups supporting the efforts of adjuncts to organize for improved wages and working conditions include the Service Employees International Union, the United Steelworkers, and the New Faculty Majority Foundation.

== Unionization efforts ==
Increasingly, non-tenure-track faculty are turning to unions, including the American Federation of Teachers, the Service Employees International Union, and United Auto Workers, to improve their wages and working conditions. Adjunct faculty have successfully pushed for contracts at American University, Georgetown University, George Washington University, Howard University, Montgomery College, Trinity Washington University, and Loyola University Chicago. At other colleges and universities, such as Boston University, Lesley University, Northeastern University, and Tufts University, adjuncts have voted to unionize.

The American Federation of Teachers has more than 150 adjunct/contingent locals.

== See also ==
- Precariat, a class of people who are chronically without stable employment
- Higher education in the United States
