= Minerva Cordero =

Puerto Rican mathematician

- Born: Bayamón, Puerto Rico
- Education: University of Puerto Rico (BS); University of California, Berkeley (MS); University of Iowa (PhD)
- Known for: Finite geometry
- Awards: AAAS IF/THEN Ambassador; HENAAC Education Award; Ford Legendary Woman; PAESMEM award
- Scientific career
- Fields: Mathematics
- Workplaces: Texas Tech University, University of Texas at Arlington
- Thesis: On p-primitive Planes
- Doctoral advisor: Norman Lloyd Johnson (Iowa)

Minerva Cordero Braña is a Puerto Rican mathematician and a professor of mathematics at the University of Texas at Arlington. She is also the university's Senior Associate Dean for the College of Science, where she is responsible for the advancement of the research mission of the college. President Biden awarded her the Presidential Award for Excellence in Science, Mathematics, and Engineering Mentoring (PAESMEM) on February 8, 2022.

== Early life and education ==
Cordero was born in Bayamón, Puerto Rico. Her mother, whose schooling stopped after the fifth grade, made education a top priority in the family home. She told her children "the best thing I can give you is an education." Cordero and her siblings would do their homework together and discussed what they learned in school each day. Cordero said, "We learned each other's subjects." Wanting to go to college, Cordero bought herself a college exam preparation book in high school and studied for the college-entrance exam. She states that her exam scores were the highest scores for her high school, Miguel Melendez Munoz High School.

Cordero attended the Universidad de Puerto Rico in Rio Piedras and received her B.S. in Mathematics in 1981. She was granted a National Science Foundation Minority Graduate Fellowship which she used to attend the University of California at Berkeley to obtain her masters in mathematics in 1983. She continued her studies at the University of Iowa, and obtained her Ph.D. in mathematics in 1989 under Norman Johnson.

== Career and research ==
Cordero's research is in the area of finite semifields (non-associative algebras) and their associated planes (viewed affinely or projectively) in the general area of finite geometry.

After earning her Ph.D., Cordero worked as an associate and an assistant professor at Texas Tech University until 2001, when she joined the faculty at the University of Texas at Arlington. Cordero served as the Mathematical Association of America's Governor-at-Large for Minority Interests from 2008 to 2011.

Cordero's most-cited work is A survey of finite semifields. She was the Principal Investigator for a National Science Foundation grant of $2.85 million awarded to the University of Texas at Arlington in 2009 for a project that placed mathematics graduate students in Arlington public schools to enhance teaching and learning in the classrooms and to inspire students to pursue careers in STEM (Science, Technology, Engineering, and Mathematics).

== Awards and honors ==
- New Faculty Award, Texas Tech University, 1994
- Professor of the Year, student chapter of the Mathematical Association of America at Texas Tech University, 1995
- President's Excellence in Teaching Award, Texas Tech University, 1999
- Outstanding Hispanic Women of the South Plains, South Plains Hispanic Chamber of Commerce, 2000
- Featured Biography, Mathematical Association of America Strengthening Underrepresented Minority Mathematics Achievement (SUMMA) Program, 2001
- University of Texas Board of Regents' Outstanding Teaching Award, 2009
- Featured Biography, SACNAS Biography Project, 2011
- Certificate of Meritorious Service, Mathematical Association of America, 2012
- Ford Legendary Women (Mujeres Legendarias de Ford), 2016
- Great Minds in STEM 2016 HENAAC Award Education Distinction, 2016
- American Association for the Advancement of Science IF/THEN Ambassador, 2019
- Presidential Award for Excellence in Science, Mathematics and Engineering Mentoring (PAESMEM), 2022
- Fellow of the Association for Women in Mathematics in the Class of 2023.
