= Harshini Mukundan =

Indian-American microbiologist

Harshini Mukundan is an Indian-American microbiologist. She is a Fellow of the American Association for the Advancement of Science.

== Life ==
She grew up in India. Mukundan received her Bachelor's of Science Degree in Microbiology from the University of Delhi in 1995. In 1997, she earned in Master's Degree in Microbiology from Barkatullah University and then went on to complete her Ph.D. in Biomedical Sciences from the University of New Mexico School of Medicine.

From 2006 to 2022, she worked at Los Alamos National Laboratory. Her work focuses on developing tools for detecting infectious diseases. Her research on developing universal bacterial diagnostics based on innate immune recognition led to an RD100 Award in 2018. Her work on developing portable biosensors for pathogen detection and diagnosis -PEGASUS - lead to an RD100 Award in 2021. She currently is a senior scientist and leads the chemical and biological technologies program portfolio in the Office for National and Homeland Security at Lawrence Berkeley National Laboratory.

She is an IF/THEN STEM Ambassador. She received the Women in Technology Award from the New Mexico Tech Council. She is a Fellow of the American Association for the Advancement of Science. She appeared in “Mission Unstoppable”.

Mukundan is married to Rangachary Mukundan, also a senior scientist at Berkeley Lab and has two children.
