= Odor source localization =

Robotics problem of locating the source of a chemical plume using mobile sensors

Odor source localization (OSL) is the problem of locating the origin of an airborne or waterborne chemical plume using one or more mobile sensors, typically robots equipped with chemical sensors. The task sits at the intersection of robotics, fluid dynamics and machine olfaction. Chemical plumes in turbulent flows are intermittent and patchy, and most chemical sensors respond slowly and have limited selectivity, so the instantaneous reading available to a moving sensor is a poor proxy for the underlying time-averaged concentration field. Robotic OSL has been studied since the late 1980s and has applications including the detection of gas leaks, search and rescue after industrial accidents, and environmental monitoring of industrial emissions.

== History ==
Robotic odor search emerged in the late 1980s and 1990s, drawing on earlier work in chemical ecology that had described how moths and other insects locate distant pheromone sources. R. A. Russell at Monash University was among the first to build mobile robots that followed chemical trails on the floor and tracked airborne odor plumes. Distributed and multi-robot odor search were investigated by Hayes, Martinoli and Goodman at the California Institute of Technology and EPFL, who studied cooperative plume-tracing on simulated and physical robot swarms. In 2007 Vergassola, Villermaux and Shraiman introduced infotaxis, an information-theoretic search strategy in which a sensor moves so as to maximize the expected information gain about source location, rather than following a chemical concentration gradient; the paper appeared in Nature and prompted substantial follow-up work in the robotics community. From the mid-2010s, multi-rotor unmanned aerial vehicles carrying lightweight chemical sensors became a common experimental platform for OSL research.

== Problem formulation ==
OSL is generally decomposed into three sub-problems: plume detection (deciding whether a chemical signal is present), plume traversal (moving so as to remain in contact with the plume), and source declaration (deciding when the source has been reached). The mathematical difficulty depends strongly on the assumed dispersion model. In laminar or low-Reynolds number flows a Gaussian advection–diffusion model gives a smooth concentration field with a well-defined gradient. In turbulent flows, which dominate most realistic environments, the plume is filamentary: the sensor receives short, randomly spaced bursts of chemical separated by periods of zero signal, and the time-averaged field is not a useful guide on the time scales at which a robot must act. Source-term estimation, surveyed by Hutchinson and colleagues, additionally aims to recover both the position and the release rate of the source from the observed concentrations, often using probabilistic filters.

== Biological inspiration ==
Many OSL strategies are explicitly modeled on the behavior of male moths flying upwind toward a pheromone source. As reviewed by Cardé and Willis, moths combine an upwind surge whenever they detect a filament of pheromone with a wider crosswind cast when contact is lost, producing a characteristic zig-zag trajectory that has been transposed onto mobile robots by several groups. Other biological models draw on the search behavior of dogs and of marine animals such as blue crabs and lobsters, which integrate chemical and bilateral hydrodynamic cues over much shorter ranges.

== Algorithms and strategies ==
=== Reactive strategies ===
Reactive strategies select the next motion as a direct function of the current sensor reading. Chemotaxis steers along the locally estimated concentration gradient, which is effective in laminar plumes but degrades severely in turbulence. Anemotaxis exploits a measured wind direction by surging upwind when chemical contact is made. The bio-inspired cast-and-surge family combines anemotaxis with a deterministic crosswind cast on contact loss, and is the dominant reactive approach for turbulent environments.

=== Probabilistic and information-theoretic strategies ===
Probabilistic methods maintain a posterior distribution over possible source locations and choose actions that improve that distribution. The infotaxis strategy of Vergassola, Villermaux and Shraiman selects the move that maximizes the expected reduction in entropy of the source-location posterior, and is effective in regimes where the spatial gradient is unusable. Bayesian source-term estimation extends this idea by inferring both source position and release rate, typically using particle filters or sequential Monte Carlo.

=== Map-based strategies ===
Map-based methods build a spatial model of the time-averaged gas distribution from sensor readings collected along the robot's trajectory and search for local maxima in that model. Lilienthal and colleagues describe a family of kernel-based gas distribution mapping techniques in which point measurements are convolved with a Gaussian kernel to produce a spatially extrapolated estimate. Such methods are most useful when the source can be assumed quasi-stationary and the robot is able to revisit locations.

=== Multi-robot and swarm strategies ===
Multiple robots searching cooperatively can shorten search times. Cooperative formations spread the sensors across the crosswind axis, making detection of an intermittent plume more likely. Swarm-based approaches, reviewed by Wang and colleagues, deploy larger numbers of simpler agents and rely on collective behavior rather than centralized planning; reported advantages include improved coverage of the search area and the possibility of locating multiple sources in parallel.

== Sensors and platforms ==
Most OSL systems use metal-oxide semiconductor (MOX) sensors, photoionization detectors or electrochemical cells, which trade off sensitivity, selectivity, response time and power consumption. Ishida and colleagues describe how these sensors interact with airflow around the robot body, an effect that motivates careful aerodynamic design and active sampling. Mobile platforms include wheeled ground robots for indoor and structured outdoor environments, multi-rotor unmanned aerial vehicles for open spaces and elevated sources, and autonomous underwater vehicles for chemical plumes in the marine environment.

== Notable systems ==
Among the early demonstrations, R. A. Russell's series of differential-drive robots at Monash University localized volatile sources in still and ventilated rooms during the 1990s. The Smelling Nano Aerial Vehicle reported by Burgués and colleagues used a Crazyflie nano-quadcopter (approximately 27 grams in mass and 10 cm across) carrying a custom MOX gas sensing board, and built three-dimensional gas distribution maps of indoor releases from sweeping flights of less than three minutes. The GADEN simulator, released by Monroy and colleagues, couples three-dimensional dispersion computed from an OpenFOAM CFD solver with models of MOX and photo-ionization gas sensors, and is widely used to test mobile-robot olfaction algorithms in simulation.

== Applications ==
Reported applications include the localization of natural-gas and methane leaks in urban infrastructure, search for chemical contamination after industrial accidents, search and rescue, and environmental monitoring of industrial emissions. Drug- and explosives-detection robots are an adjacent application area, although these typically rely on close-range sniffing rather than long-range plume tracking.

== Open challenges ==
Open challenges identified in recent reviews include the limited speed, selectivity and stability of available chemical sensors; the scarcity of standardized, large-scale benchmarks comparable to those available in computer vision; reliable handling of multi-source environments, where standard single-source assumptions fail; and the integration of OSL with other autonomous-vehicle subsystems such as obstacle avoidance and navigation in three-dimensional turbulent flow.

== See also ==
- Machine olfaction
- Electronic nose
- Bio-inspired robotics
- Plume (fluid dynamics)
- Chemotaxis
- Anemotaxis
- Simultaneous localization and mapping
- Search algorithm
