= Wenxuan Zhong =

Chinese-American statistician

Wenxuan Zhong is a Chinese-American statistician whose research focuses on big data. On the theoretical side, her work has involved feature selection, functional data analysis, and causal inference, with applications to chemical sensor arrays, epigenetics, metagenomics, and neuroimaging. She is UGA Athletic Association Professor in Statistics at the University of Georgia.

== Education and career ==
Zhong studied statistics as an undergraduate at Nankai University in China. She completed a Ph.D. in 2005 at Purdue University. Her dissertation, Nonparametric Clustering and Model Selection with Application in Bioinformatics, was supervised by Michael Yu Zhu.

After postdoctoral research at Harvard University with Jun S. Liu, she became an assistant professor of statistics at the University of Illinois Urbana-Champaign in 2007. She moved to her present position at the University of Georgia in 2013, and was named as the UGA Athletic Association Professor in Statistics in 2024.

== Recognition ==
Zhong was named as a Fellow of the American Statistical Association in 2022, "for outstanding contributions to statistical methodology for high-dimensional and complex data in biomedical sciences; for outstanding mentoring of women and junior researchers; and for exemplary service to the profession".
