= Electronic skin =

Electronics mimicking skin functionalities

Electronic skin, also known as e-skin, refers to flexible, stretchable, and self-healing electronics that are able to mimic the functionalities of human or animal skin. This broad class of materials often contains sensing abilities, which are designed to reproduce the capabilities of human skin to respond to environmental factors such as changes in heat and pressure.

Advances in electronic skin research focus on the design of materials that should exhibit the following characteristics: high sensitivity/resolution, low thickness, conformability, flexibility and stretchability, durability and robustness, self-healing, biocompatibility, high spatial resolution, low power consumption and self-powered, sweat induction/analysis, and real-time data processing.

Research in the individual fields of flexible electronics and tactile sensing has progressed significantly. However, the field of electronic skin design aims to integrate advances from multiple areas of materials research without sacrificing the individual benefits derived from each field. The successful combination of flexible and stretchable mechanical properties with integrated sensors and self-healing capabilities would enable numerous applications, including soft robotics, prosthetics, artificial intelligence systems, and health monitoring devices.

Recent advances in the field of electronic skin have focused on incorporating green materials ideals and environmental awareness into the design process. As one of the main challenges facing electronic skin development is the ability of the material to withstand mechanical strain and maintain sensing ability or electronic properties, recyclability and self-healing properties are especially critical in the future design of new electronic skins.

== Rehealable electronic skin ==
Self-healing abilities of electronic skin are critical to potential applications of electronic skin in fields such as soft robotics. Proper design of self-healing electronic skin requires not only healing of the base substrate but also the reestablishment of any sensing functions such as tactile sensing or electrical conductivity. Ideally, the self-healing process of electronic skin does not rely upon outside stimulation such as increased temperature, pressure, or solvation. Self-healing, or rehealable, electronic skin is often achieved through a polymer-based material or a hybrid material.

=== Polymer-based materials ===
In 2018, Zou et al. published work on electronic skin that is able to reform covalent bonds when damaged. The group looked at a polyimine-based crosslinked network, synthesized as seen in Figure 1. The e-skin is considered rehealable because of "reversible bond exchange," meaning that the bonds holding the network together are able to break and reform under certain conditions such as solvation and heating. The rehealable and reusable aspect of such a thermoset material is unique because many thermoset materials irreversibly form crosslinked networks through covalent bonds. In the polymer network the bonds formed during the healing process are indistinguishable from the original polymer network.

Figure 1. Polymerization scheme for formation of polyimine-based self-healing electronic skin

Dynamic non-covalent crosslinking has also been shown to form a polymer network that is rehealable. In 2016, Oh et al. looked specifically at semiconducting polymers for organic transistors. They found that incorporating 2,6-pyridine dicarboxamide (PDCA) into the polymer backbone could impart self-healing abilities based on the network of hydrogen bonds formed between groups. With incorporation of PDCA in the polymer backbone, the materials was able to withstand up to 100% strain without showing signs of microscale cracking. In this example, the hydrogen bonds are available for energy dissipation as the strain increases.

=== Hybrid materials ===
Polymer networks are able to facilitate dynamic healing processes through hydrogen bonds or dynamic covalent chemistry. However, the incorporation of inorganic particles can greatly expand the functionality of polymer-based materials for electronic skin applications. The incorporation of micro-structured nickel particles into a polymer network (Figure 2) has been shown to maintain self-healing properties based on the reformation of hydrogen bonding networks around the inorganic particles. The material is able to regain its conductivity within 15 seconds of breakage, and the mechanical properties are regained after 10 minutes at room temperature without added stimulus. This material relies on hydrogen bonds formed between urea groups when they align. The hydrogen atoms of urea functional groups are ideally situated to form a hydrogen-bonding network because they are near an electron-withdrawing carbonyl group. This polymer network with embedded nickel particles demonstrates the possibility of using polymers as supramolecular hosts to develop self-healing conductive composites.

Figure 2. Self-healing material based on hydrogen bonding and interactions with micro-structured nickel particles.

Flexible and porous graphene foams that are interconnected in a 3D manner have also been shown to have self-healing properties. Thin film with poly(N,N-dimethylacrylamide)-poly(vinyl alcohol) (PDMAA) and reduced graphene oxide have shown high electrical conductivity and self-healing properties. The healing abilities of the hybrid composite are suspected to be due to the hydrogen bonds between the PDMAA chains, and the healing process is able to restore initial length and recover conductive properties.

== Recyclable electronic skin ==
Zou et al. presents an interesting advance in the field of electronic skin that can be used in robotics, prosthetics, and many other applications in the form of a fully recyclable electronic skin material. The e-skin developed by the group consists of a network of covalently bound polymers that are thermoset, meaning cured at a specific temperature. However, the material is also recyclable and reusable. Because the polymer network is thermoset, it is chemically and thermally stable. However, at room temperature, the polyimine material, with or without silver nanoparticles, can be dissolved on the timescale of a few hours. The recycling process allows devices, which are damaged beyond self-healing capabilities, to be dissolved and formed into new devices (Figure 3). This advance opens the door for lower cost production and greener approaches to e-skin development.

Figure 3. Recycling process for conductive polyimine-based e-skin.

== Flexible and stretchy electronic skin ==
The ability of electronic skin to withstand mechanical deformation including stretching and flexing without losing functionality is crucial for its applications as prosthetics, artificial intelligence, soft robotics, health monitoring, biocompatibility, and communication devices. Flexible electronics are often designed by depositing electronic materials on flexible polymer substrates, thereby relying on an organic substrate to impart favorable mechanical properties. Stretchable e-skin materials have been approached from two directions. Hybrid materials can rely on an organic network for stretchiness while embedding inorganic particles or sensors, which are not inherently stretchable. Other research has focused on developing stretchable materials that also have favorable electronic or sensing capabilities.

Zou et al. studied the inclusion of linkers that are described as "serpentine" in their polyimine matrix. These linkers make the e-skin sensors able to flex with movement and distortion. The incorporation of alkyl spacers in polymer-based materials has also been shown to increase flexibility without decreasing charge transfer mobility. Oh et al. developed a stretchable and flexible material based on 3,6-di(thiophen-2-yl)-2,5-dihydropyrrolo[3,4-c]pyrrole-1,4-dione (DPP) and non-conjugated 2,6-pyridine dicarboxamide (PDCA) as a source of hydrogen bonds (Figure 4).

Figure 4. A stretchable and self-healing semiconducting polymer-based material.

Graphene has also been shown to be a suitable material for electronic skin applications as well due to its stiffness and tensile strength. Graphene is an appealing material because its synthesis to flexible substrates is scalable and cost-efficient.

=== Mechanical properties of skin ===
Skin is composed of collagen, keratin, and elastin fibers, which provide robust mechanical strength, low modulus, tear resistance, and softness. The skin can be considered as a bilayer of epidermis and dermis. The epidermal layer has a modulus of about 140–600 kPa and a thickness of 0.05–1.5 mm. Dermis has a modulus of 2–80 kPa and a thickness of 0.3–3 mm. This bilayer skin exhibits an elastic linear response for strains less than 15% and a non linear response at larger strains. To achieve conformability, it is preferable for devices to match the mechanical properties of the epidermis layer when designing skin-based stretchy electronics.

=== Tuning mechanical properties ===
Conventional high performance electronic devices are made of inorganic materials such as silicon, which is rigid and brittle in nature and exhibits poor biocompatibility due to mechanical mismatch between the skin and the device, making skin integrated electronics applications difficult. To solve this challenge, researchers employed the method of constructing flexible electronics in the form of ultrathin layers. The resistance to bending of a material object (Flexural rigidity) is related to the third power of the thickness, according to the Euler-Bernoulli equation for a beam. It implies that objects with less thickness can bend and stretch more easily. As a result, even though the material has a relatively high Young's modulus, devices manufactured on ultrathin substrates exhibit a decrease in bending stiffness and allow bending to a small radius of curvature without fracturing. Thin devices have been developed as a result of significant advancements in the field of nanotechnology, fabrication, and manufacturing. The aforementioned approach was used to create devices composed of 100–200 nm thick Si nano membranes deposited on thin flexible polymeric substrates.

Furthermore, structural design considerations can be used to tune the mechanical stability of the devices. Engineering the original surface structure allows us to soften the stiff electronics. Buckling, island connection, and the Kirigami concept have all been employed successfully to make the entire system stretchy.

Mechanical buckling can be used to create wavy structures on elastomeric thin substrates. This feature improves the device's stretchability. The buckling approach was used to create Si nanoribbons from single crystal Si on an elastomeric substrate. The study demonstrated the device could bear a maximum strain of 10% when compressed and stretched.

In the case of island interconnect, the rigid material connects with flexible bridges made from different geometries, such as zig-zag, serpentine-shaped structures, etc., to reduce the effective stiffness, tune the stretchability of the system, and elastically deform under applied strains in specific directions. It has been demonstrated that serpentine-shaped structures have no significant effect on the electrical characteristics of epidermal electronics. It has also been shown that the entanglement of the interconnects, which oppose the movement of the device above the substrate, causes the spiral interconnects to stretch and deform significantly more than the serpentine structures. CMOS inverters constructed on a PDMS substrate employing 3D island interconnect technologies demonstrated 140% strain at stretching.

Kirigami is built around the concept of folding and cutting in 2D membranes. This contributes to an increase in the tensile strength of the substrate, as well as its out-of-plane deformation and stretchability. These 2D structures can subsequently be turned to 3D structures with varied topography, shape, and size controllability via the Buckling process, resulting in interesting properties and applications.

== Conductive electronic skin ==
The development of conductive electronic skin is of interest for many electrical applications. Research into conductive electronic skin has taken two routes: conductive self-healing polymers or embedding conductive inorganic materials in non-conductive polymer networks.

The self-healing conductive composite synthesized by Tee et al. (Figure 2) investigated the incorporation of micro-structured nickel particles into a polymer host. The nickel particles adhere to the network though favorable interactions between the native oxide layer on the surface of the particles and the hydrogen-bonding polymer.

Nanoparticles have also been studied for their ability to impart conductivity on electronic skin materials. Zou et al. embedded silver nanoparticles (AgNPs) into a polymer matrix, making the e-skin conductive. The healing process for this material is noteworthy because it not only restores the mechanical properties of the polymer network, but also restores the conductive properties when silver nanoparticles have been embedded in the polymer network.

== Sensing ability of electronic skin ==
Some of the challenges that face electronic skin sensing abilities include the fragility of sensors, the recovery time of sensors, repeatability, overcoming mechanical strain, and long-term stability.

=== Tactile sensors ===
Applied pressure can be measured by monitoring changes in resistance or capacitance. Coplanar interdigitated electrodes embedded on single-layer graphene have been shown to provide pressure sensitivity for applied pressure as low as 0.11 kPa through measuring changes in capacitance. Piezoresistive sensors have also shown high levels of sensitivity.

Ultrathin molybdenum disulfide sensing arrays integrated with graphene have demonstrated promising mechanical properties capable of pressure sensing. Modifications of organic field-effect transistors (OFETs) have shown promise in electronic skin applications. Microstructured polydimethylsiloxane thin films can elastically deform when pressure is applied. The deformation of the thin film allows for storage and release of energy.

Visual representation of applied pressure has been one area of interest in development of tactile sensors. The Bao Group at Stanford University have designed an electrochromically active electronic skin that changes color with different amounts of applied pressure. Applied pressure can also be visualized by incorporation of active-matrix organic light-emitting diode displays which emit light when pressure is applied.

Prototype e-skins include a printed synaptic transistor–based electronic skin giving skin-like haptic sensations and touch/pain-sensitivity to a robotic hand, and a multilayer tactile sensor repairable hydrogel-based robot skin.

=== Other sensing applications ===
Humidity sensors have been incorporated in electronic skin design with sulfurized tungsten films. The conductivity of the film changes with different levels of humidity. Silicon nanoribbons have also been studied for their application as temperature, pressure, and humidity sensors. Scientists at the University of Glasgow have made inroads in developing an e-skin that feels pain real-time, with applications in prosthetics and more life-like humanoids.

A system of an electronic skin and a human-machine interface can enable remote sensed tactile perception and wearable or robotic sensing of many hazardous substances and pathogens.

== See also ==
- Artificial cell
- Artificial skin
- Artificial muscle
- Electronic nose
- Electronic tongue
- Robotic sensing
- Sensitive skin
- Soft robotics
