= Darren Lipomi =

American chemical engineer and academic administrator

Darren J. Lipomi
- Born: Hilton, New York, U.S.
- Education: Boston University (B.S.); Harvard University (Ph.D.)
- Known for: Electronic skin, stretchable electronics, science communication
- Awards: PECASE (2019); NIH Director's New Innovator Award (2015)
- Scientific career
- Fields: Chemical engineering Materials science Organic electronics
- Workplaces: University of Rochester; University of California, San Diego
- Doctoral advisor: George M. Whitesides

Darren J. Lipomi is an American chemical engineer, materials scientist, and academic administrator. He is the Chair of the Department of Chemical and Sustainability Engineering at the University of Rochester. His research focuses on organic electronics, wearable sensors, and "electronic skin" designed to mimic the mechanical properties of biological tissue.

== Early life and education ==
Lipomi grew up in Hilton, New York. He attended Boston University, where he earned a B.S. in chemistry with a minor in physics in 2005 as a Beckman Scholar. He received his Ph.D. in chemistry from Harvard University in 2010 under the supervision of George M. Whitesides. From 2010 to 2012, he was an Intelligence Community Postdoctoral Fellow at Stanford University in the laboratory of Zhenan Bao.

== Career ==
Lipomi joined the faculty of the University of California, San Diego (UC San Diego) in 2012 as a professor of nanoengineering in the Jacobs School of Engineering. During his tenure, he served as Faculty Director of the IDEA Engineering Student Center (2021–2022) and as Associate Dean for Students (2022–2024).

In July 2024, Lipomi was appointed Chair of the Department of Chemical Engineering at the University of Rochester. Under his leadership, the department was renamed the Department of Chemical and Sustainability Engineering to reflect a focus on green technologies and circularity.

In 2024, Lipomi co-authored the textbook Introduction to Nanoengineering with Robert S. Ramji, published by the Royal Society of Chemistry.

== Research ==
Lipomi's research centers on the molecular engineering of electronic and electroactive polymers, with a focus on the mechanical properties of semiconducting polymers for flexible solar cells, biomechanical sensors, and phenomena at the intersection of materials chemistry with human perception.

While a postdoctoral fellow at Stanford, Lipomi was part of the team that developed a transparent, stretchable skin-like sensor using carbon nanotube films, published in Nature Nanotechnology in 2011.

His independent research at UC San Diego focused on developing stretchable, biodegradable, and self-healing semiconducting materials, often referred to as "electronic skin." His research has applications in health monitoring, prosthetic sensors, and human-machine interfaces.

In 2014, his group's work on "molecularly stretchable electronics" was reported in ScienceDaily. In 2024, his team published research in Science Robotics on a soft, stretchable electrode capable of simulating touch sensations through electrical signals, with coverage in ScienceDaily and The Engineer.

In 2017, Lipomi's group published a study in PLOS ONE on a low-cost sensor glove for recognizing American Sign Language fingerspelling. The project received attention from The Atlantic, which discussed it in a broader investigation of why sign-language gloves have failed to serve the Deaf community.

His laboratory also explores a field he terms "organic haptics," which combines active polymers, contact mechanics, and psychophysics.

== Science communication ==
Lipomi is active in public science education. He hosts the Molecular Podcasting with Darren Lipomi series, available on major podcast platforms, which covers topics related to STEM academia, research, and professional development.

He also manages a YouTube channel where he discusses academic career strategies, STEM education, and research guidance. He has posted over 200 videos since starting the channel in 2017. A 2024 profile in UC San Diego Magazine, titled "Academic Influencer," described his approach to sharing candid experiences about topics including rejection, anxiety, and navigating academia.

== Awards and honors ==
- Presidential Early Career Award for Scientists and Engineers (PECASE) (2019).
- NIH Director's New Innovator Award (2015).
- NSF BRITE-Pivot Award (2022)
- AFOSR Young Investigator Program Award (2013)

== Selected publications ==
- Lipomi, Darren J.; Vosgueritchian, Michael; Tee, Benjamin C-K.; Hellstrom, Sondra L.; Lee, Jennifer A.; Fox, Courtney H.; Bao, Zhenan (2011). "Skin-like pressure and strain sensors based on transparent elastic films of carbon nanotubes". Nature Nanotechnology. 6 (12): 788–792. doi:10.1038/nnano.2011.184.
- Lipomi, Darren J.; Ramji, Robert S. (2024). Introduction to Nanoengineering. Royal Society of Chemistry. ISBN 978-1-83767-211-0.
