= Vergassola =

Vergassola is an Italian surname. Notable people with the surname include:

- Dario Vergassola (born 1957), Italian comedian, actor and singer-songwriter
- Massimo Vergassola, Italian physicist and Fellow of the [American Physical Society]
- Simone Vergassola (born 1976), Italian former footballer
