= Sensitive skin (disambiguation) =

Sensitive skin is a skin condition in which skin is prone to itching and irritation.

Sensitive skin or Sensitive Skin may also refer to:

- Sensitive skin (electronic device)
- Sensitive Skin (magazine)
- Sensitive Skin (British TV series), a 2005–07 television series on BBC Two
- Sensitive Skin (Canadian TV series), a 2014 Canadian television adaptation of the British series
