= Sensitive skin (electronic device) =

Sensitive skin, also known as sensate skin or electronic skin (e-skin), is an electronic sensing skin placed on the surface of a machine such as a robotic arm. The goal of the skin is to sense important environmental parameters—such as proximity to objects, heat, moisture, and direct touch sensations. Examples of a sensitive skin have been made by a group at the University of Tokyo led by Prof. Takao Someya.

The group's work has been published in Nature, Science and Advanced Materials journals, as well as Proceedings of the (United States) National Academy of Sciences. They have demonstrated pressure and temperature measurements at a resolution of a few millimeters, as well as organic transistors, organic solar cells, and organic light emitting diodes about 1 μm thick.

The sensor arrays are based on many organic thin film transistors that are turned on one at a time and the current that flows through the sensor (electrical resistance-based) tells you how much pressure is being sensed. They have simultaneously measured pressure and temperature by using two separate arrays and laying one on top of another.

== See also ==
- Electronic nose
- Electronic skin
- Tactile sensor
