= Chemical sensor array =

Arrangement of chemical sensors

A chemical sensor array is a sensor architecture with multiple sensor components that create a pattern for analyte detection from the additive responses of individual sensor components. There exist several types of chemical sensor arrays including electronic, optical, acoustic wave, and potentiometric devices. These chemical sensor arrays can employ multiple sensor types that are cross-reactive or tuned to sense specific analytes.

== Overview ==
=== Definition ===
Sensor array components are individual sensors, which are selected based on their individual sensing properties (i.e. method of detection, specificity for a particular class of analyte and molecular interaction). Sensor components are chosen to respond to as many analytes as possible; so, while the sensitivity and selectivity of individual sensor components vary, the sensors have an additive effect by creating a nonselective fingerprint for a particular analyte when combined into an array architecture. Recognition of fingerprints enables detection of analytes in mixtures. Chemical sensor arrays differ from other multianalyte tests such as a urinalysis stick assay which utilizes multiple, specific sensor materials for targeted detection of analytes in a mixture; instead, chemical sensor arrays rely on cross-reactivity of individual sensor components to generate fingerprints based on the additive responses of sensor components to the target analyte.

=== Comparison to other chemical sensors ===
Single sensor devices sense target analytes based on physical, optical, and electronic properties. Some sensors contain specific molecular targets to afford strong and specific binding with a particular analyte; however, while this approach is specific, complex mixture impact sensor performance. Several of these complex mixtures include odors and vapors exhaled from the lungs. Individual chemical sensors often utilize controlled sensing environments, and variations in ambient conditions (e.g., temperature and humidity) can interfere with sensor performance. Chemical sensor arrays employ pattern recognition of combinatorial responses of cross-reactive sensor components to enable sensing of a diverse array of mixtures in a variety of conditions. Chemical sensor arrays are often noted as mimicking the five senses—audition, gustation, olfaction, somatosensation, and vision—because the combinatorial responses to the different array components of a particular analytes create fingerprints for specific analytes or mixtures using both targeted molecular interactions and pattern recognition.

=== History ===
The history of chemical sensor arrays is closely linked with the development of other chemical sensor technologies, with research in the area of electronic chemical sensors picking up in the 1960s with the demonstration of metal-oxide semiconductor sensors capable of sensing analyses such as oxygen. Humans are capable of identifying and discerning between an estimated 10,000 scents or more, while only possessing 400 olfactory receptors. Signal processing in the brain of individual array component responses of olfactory receptors results in pattern recognition for discrimination of a particular scent. One of the design aims of many chemical sensor arrays is to mimic the performance of olfaction to design an electronic nose integrated with a variety of materials. Combining chemical sensor arrays with pattern recognition methods mimics biological sensory recognition methods. See Figure 1. Commercially available electronic nose systems exist and are used in the food industry for quality control. Current research efforts demonstrate the introduction of the electronic nose principle into environmental monitoring and medicine both as commercial instruments as well as in consumer-grade wearable electronic devices. At the center of chemical sensor arrays is the principle that different analytes will interact differently with a variety of materials. As such, any sort of material may be used in a sensor array, so long as it responds differently to different analytes or mixtures. From this idea, cross-reactive sensor arrays have been the focus of chemical sensor array development for their broad compatibility with the compounds as components of mixtures.

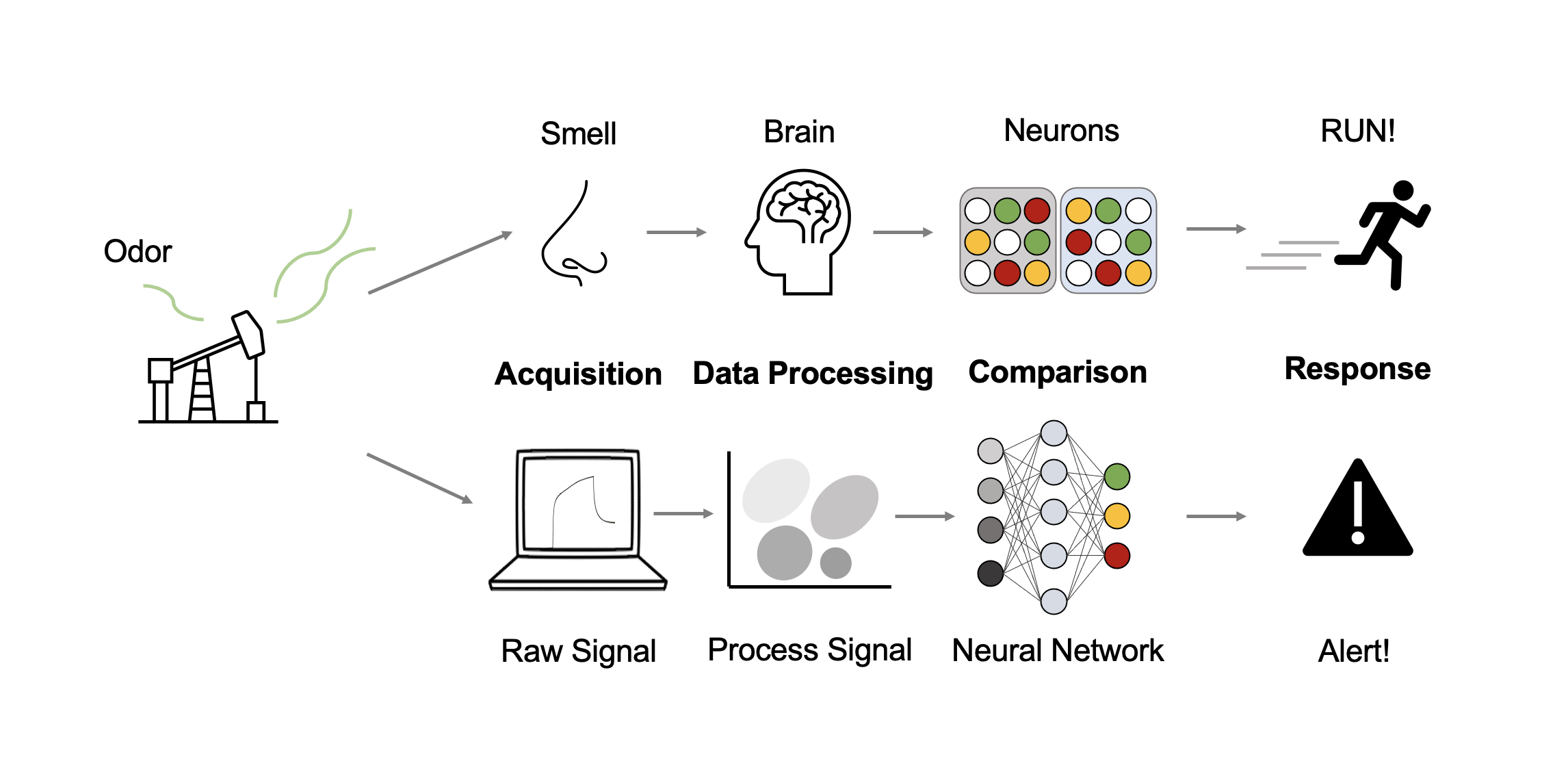
Figure 1. The design and inspiration for many chemical sensor arrays is one or more of the five senses such as smell or taste. As depicted here, the process by which sensor array data is utilized may be broken down into similar steps as odor biological odor detection: 1. acquiring a signal, 2. processing the signal, 3. comparing the signal to what is already known, and 4. producing a response.

=== Array signal processing ===
The signal(s) coming from an array sensor must be processed and compared with already-known patterns. Many techniques are useful in processing array data including principal component analysis (PCA), least square analysis, and more recently training of neural networks and utilization of machine learning for pattern development and identification. Machine learning has been a more recent development for generation and recognition of patterns for chemical sensor array data. The method of data analysis chosen depends on a variety of factors including sensing parameters, desired use of the information (quantitative or qualitative), and the method of detection which can be classified under four major types of chemical sensor array: electronic, optical, acoustic wave, and electrochemical sensor arrays.

== Electronic chemical sensor arrays ==
The first type of chemical sensor array relies on modulation of an electronic signal for signal acquisition. This type of chemical sensor array often utilizes a semiconductive material such as metal-oxide semiconductors, conductive polymers, nanomaterials, or framework materials such as metal-organic and covalent-organic frameworks. One of the simplest device architectures for an electronic chemical sensor is a chemiresistor, and other architectures include capacitors and transistors; these materials have a resistance which can be altered through physisorption or chemisorption of target molecules and thus a measurable signal as a change in electrical current, capacitance, or voltage.

=== Metal-oxide semiconductors in electronic chemical sensor arrays ===
Metal-oxide semiconductors were first reported in the 1960s as a chemiresistor sensor for single-analyte detection of organic vapors. The first commercially available chemiresistive sensors utilized metal-oxide semiconductors for the detection of carbon monoxide. Although most known for their use in carbon monoxide detectors, metal-oxide semiconductors are capable of sensing other analytes through strategic tuning of their composition. The high operating temperature required to operate these sensors make these semiconductors inefficient and cross-reactive particularly with water.

In the 1990s, several researchers at the University of Warwick created the first cross-reactive (non-selective) metal-oxide semiconductor sensor array integrated with pattern recognition software for sensing and distinguishing organic vapors, including acetone, ethanol, methanol, and xylene, in multianalyte mixtures. This electronic nose system was known as the Warwick Nose, and combined commercially available tin- and silicon-oxide semiconductors into an array format for gas sensing, see Figure 2. Current efforts are advancing the format of metal-oxide semiconductor arrays using microfabrication techniques to enable smaller array designs and integration of signal processing components into each array component. These microdevices have shown promise with lowered limits of detection and enhanced ability to distinguish volatile organic compounds and carbon monoxide with arrays containing different numbers of device, and these systems also reduce the amount of sensor material with thin films of metal-oxides. Sensitivity of sensors has also been shown to be influenced by changing the ratio of the metal within each device and data processing utilized least square analysis.

Another example of metal-oxide semiconductors is arrays of metal-oxide semiconductor field effect transistors (MOSFET), which consist of a catalytically active gate metal (such as palladium) over a silicon dioxide layer on a p-type silicon base with n-doped channels adjacent to the gate, and they have been used to sense hydrogen, ammonia, and ethanol. These MOSFETs through adsorbed-analyte modulating the semiconductor gate work function, which causes changes in voltage across the device. MOSFETs are highly tunable but remain limited by their cross-reactivity, and high operating temperatures.

=== Intrinsically conductive polymers in electronic chemical sensor arrays ===
Several intrinsically conductive polymers of interest include polyacetylene, polythiophene, and polyaniline, and others may be made conductive through processes including chemical doping. The principle chemistry underlying the electronic sensing mechanism of conductive polymers is modulation of the conductivity of these polymers upon changes to their physical structure (swelling) resulting from interactions with analytes (mainly through absorption). An advantage of using conductive polymers in sensor arrays is that there is synthetic access of a vast library of polymers. As a result, conductive polymers are a promising alternative to metal-oxide semiconductors because a greater number of sensors with different functionalities may be used to design a more robust array tailored for specific applications. Monomer identity, polymerization conditions, and device fabrication methods impact both the morphological and chemical properties of conductive polymers, which also contributes to the greater variety of possible array components which may be designed. The limitations of conductive polymer arrays are similar to those of single sensor analogs in that the signal transduction pathways through the polymer material are poorly understood and both struggle to sense non-polar species due to minimal adsorption to the polymer. Several commercially available systems are available and are used in food analysis and sensing of volatile organic compounds; however, progress to advance chemiresistive sensor arrays utilizing conductive polymers has decreased as other materials and sensing methods have been developed.

=== Nanomaterials in electronic chemical sensor arrays ===
Development of novel nanomaterials such as graphene, carbon nanotubes, and 2D and 3D framework materials have been reported as new classes of materials for applications in electronic chemical sensor arrays. For graphene and carbon nanotubes, surface functionalization via covalent or non-covalent modification, and edge site defects are utilized as sites for host-guest interactions. One such example is single-walled carbon nanotubes modified with various metalloporphyrins to enable discrimination of volatile organic compounds.

=== Conductive framework materials in electronic chemical sensor arrays ===
Conductive framework materials have similar mechanisms for sensing; however these materials may be designed with installed active sites tuned for a specific molecular interaction. Bimetallic metallophthalocyanine metal-organic frameworks (MOFs) and covalent organic frameworks (COFs) have shown promise in single device chemiresistors at sensing hydrogen sulfide, ammonia, and nitric oxide. The development of these materials as chemiresistors allows for strategic design of arrays capable of targeted molecular interactions, which can be employed to develop array components tailored to sensing specific compounds. Computational research of several MOFs has also focused on optimizing which combinations of MOFs are best suited for sensing particular components in various mixtures. The focus on curation of framework array components demonstrated the opportunity to design robust sensor arrays experimentally and computationally.

=== Mixed-material electronic chemical sensor arrays ===
Efforts have been made to overcome the specific limitations of different classes of materials suited for use in electronic chemical sensor arrays by combining sensors fabricated with different materials into one array. One example of these is metal-oxide nanowires coated in thin films of MOFs, which have been reported to have enhanced sensing performance over sensors made with the individual materials. Carbon black-polymer blends have also shown enhanced analyte discrimination and array-element signals to afford enhanced detection of volatile organic compounds both across a variety of classes, as well as within the same class.

Molecularly imprinted polymers have also been integrated into array formats and shown utility as the imprinting process enables molecularly imprinted polymer arrays to be tailors to specific analytes.

== Optical/colorimetric chemical sensor arrays ==
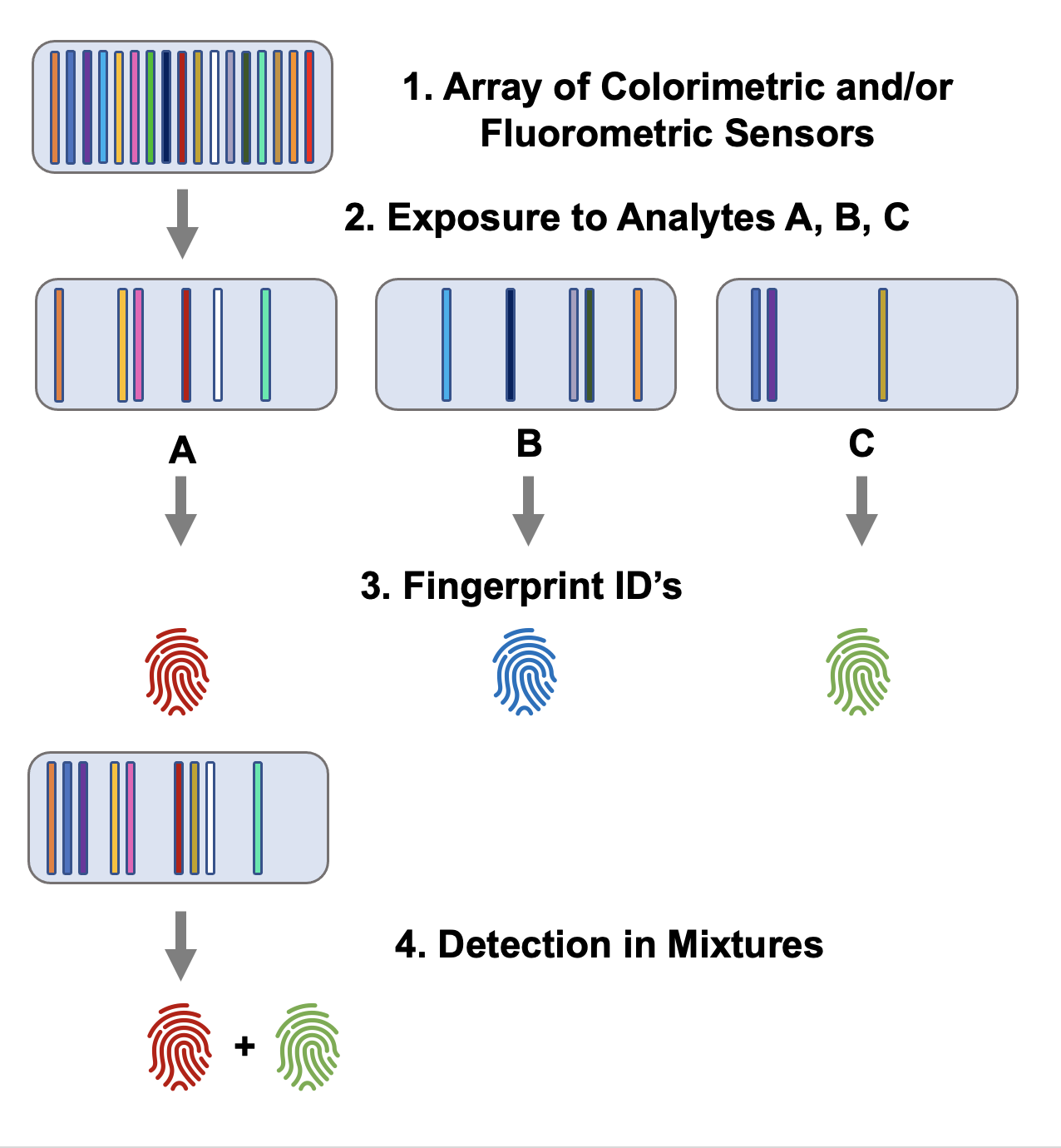
Figure 2. Overview of the principles underlying colorimetric and fluorometric sensor arrays. 1. Array of several colorimetric and/or fluorometric sensors constructed. 2–3. Exposure of the array to particular analytes allows fingerprint identification of components. 4. Multicomponent analysis of a mixture may be achieved with pattern recognition of known fingerprints. This process if another generalization of Figure 1. Adapted from Figure created by Askim and coauthors.

Separate from electronic chemical sensor arrays are optical chemical sensor arrays which probe chemical interactions between target analytes and a sensing material with light (ultraviolet, visible, infrared). Generally, optical sensors probe chemical interactions with light through a variety of quantifiable methods including absorbance, diffraction, fluorescence, refraction, and scattering. Generally, fluorescence sensors show greater sensitivity than other optical methods. Optical sensors consist of a light source, wavelength filter(s), a sample, and a detector, with variations in sensor design based on the method used. Similar to the electronic nose, optical chemical sensor arrays have been categorized under the umbrella topic of optoelectronic nose and similarly operate by developing fingerprints for specific compounds and using pattern recognition to identify those components in mixture. Figure 2. shows the principles underlying colorimetric and fluorometric sensor arrays. Chemical interactions with dyes result in changes to light being detected in an optical sensor.

Optical sensors require selective interaction with analytes and two components are required: a probe material, and a chromo- or fluorophore. Cross-reactive optical and fluorescence arrays require strategic consideration of molecular interactions between probes and analytes. Much like electrical chemical sensor arrays, optical chemical sensor arrays face challenges in sensing in the presence of competing analytes such as water. Consideration of host-guest interactions allows an array to probe a variety of molecular features because integration of ‘promiscuous sensors’ (non-selective) such as optically active polymers permit non-discriminate sensing of a variety of compounds primarily based on hydrophobicity, and so-called ‘monogamous’ sensors with exclusive binding to a particular analyte (much like a lock-and-key design) will enhance specificity and applicability of a colorimetric sensor array. Regardless of the type of sensing probe, there are five major types of intermolecular interaction which lead to a measurable colorimetric change to a material.

=== Brønsted-Lowry acid-base interactions in colorimetric chemical sensor arrays ===
Brønsted-Lowry acid-base interactions such as those of dyes commonly used as pH indicators are one of the earliest methods for colorimetric sensing. Since the early 20th century, natural dyes such as 7-hydroxyohenoxazone (litmus) and anthocyanin oxonium dye have been used both as pH indicators and colorimetric sensors. Many other chromophores with Brønsted-Lowry acid-base functionality have been developed such azo dyes, nitrophenols, phthaleins, and sulfonphthaleins. The Brønsted-Lowry acid-base functionality of these chromophores relates to specific chemical moieties within their structures and their corresponding pKa. Color changes resulting from protonation/deprotonation events may be broadly defined as intermolecular interactions with an acid or base of a particular strength and/or concentration.

=== Lewis acid-base interactions in colorimetric chemical sensor arrays ===
While Brønsted-Lowry acid-base interactions are sensitive to a broad range of compounds, Lewis acid and base interactions comprise some of the most sensitive set of intermolecular interactions relevant to colorimetric chemical sensor arrays. The selectivity of Lewis acid and base interactions in chemical sensing are underscored by the fact that the most pungent of odors arise from Lewis bases (thiols, phosphines, amines) and the metal cation-containing olfactory receptors utilized to sense them at some of the lowest concentrations of all molecular motifs in biology use Lewis acid receptors. Lewis acid dyes (namely metals cations with an open-coordination site) are used in biological olfaction for sensing. As such, Lewis acids such as metalloporphyrins are of particular interest to researchers developing colorimetric sensor because of their strong Lewis acid-base interactions.

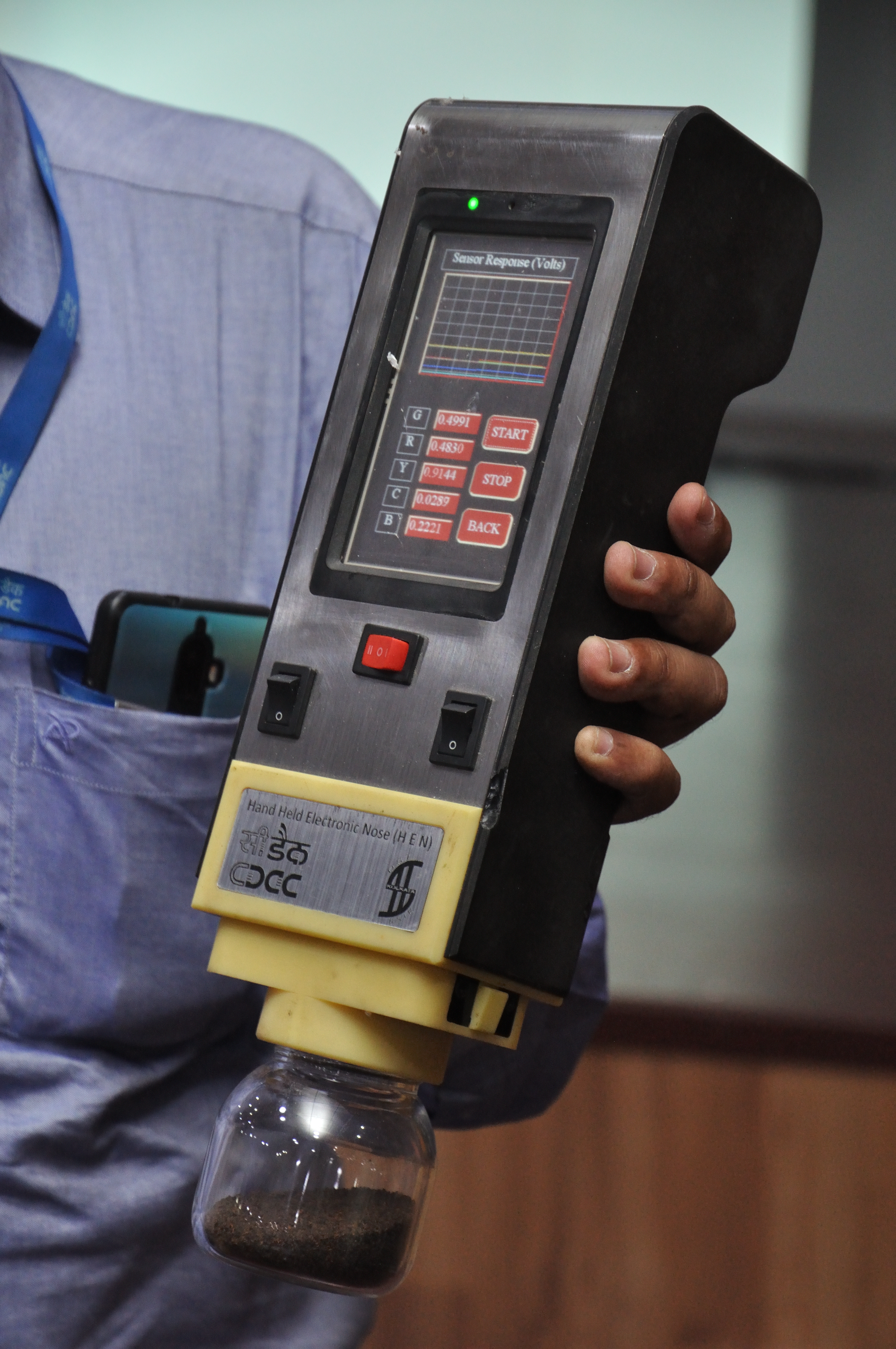
Figure 3. The Handheld Electronic Nose (HEN) employs a chemical sensor array to assess tea fermentation to enable optimization of tea preparation and quality.

=== Other interactions in colorimetric chemical sensor arrays ===
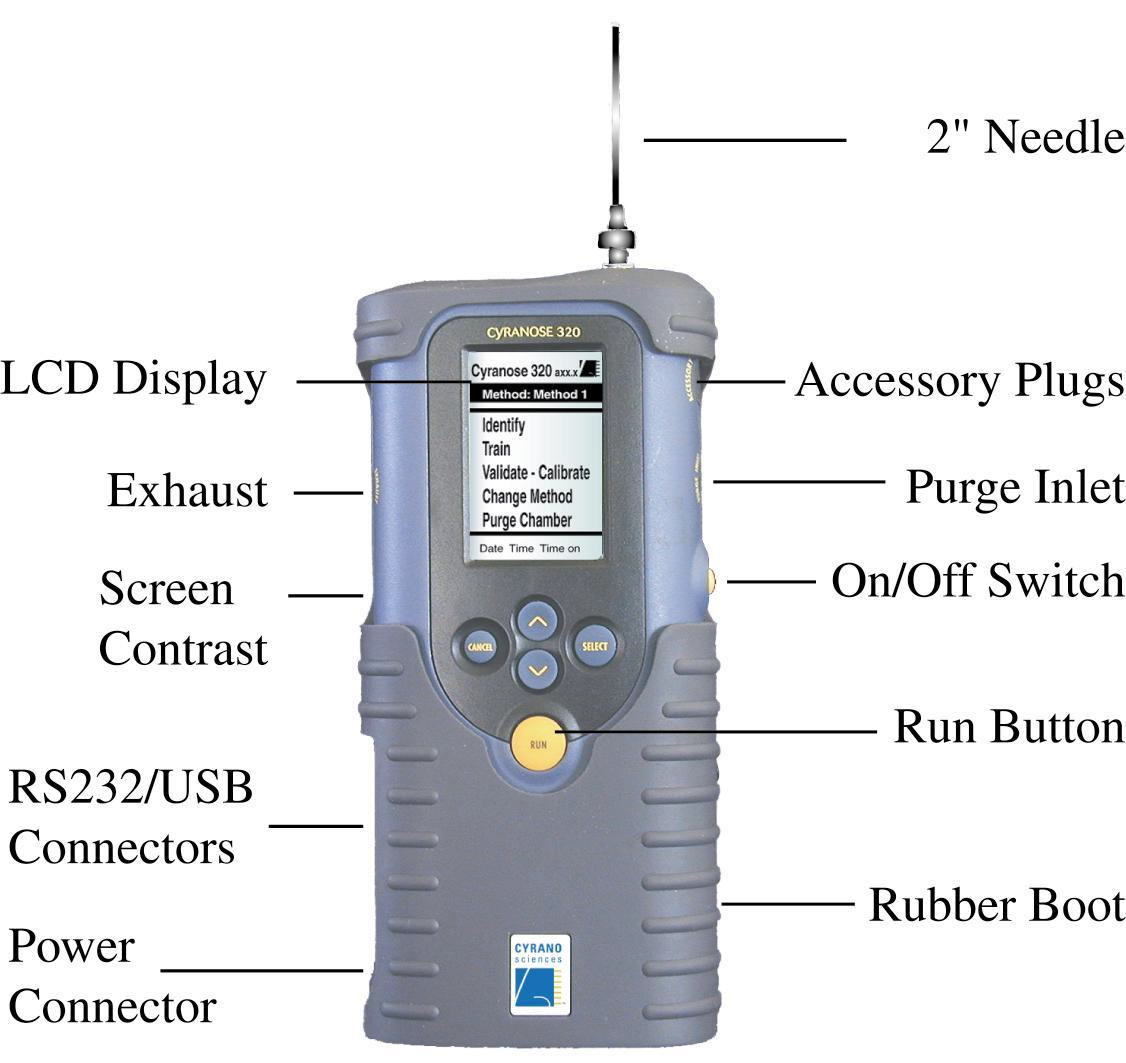
Figure 4. Diagram of Cyranose 320 electronic nose employing an array of 32 black carbon-polymer for detection of eye infection causing bacteria. Image provided by Cyranose Sciences Inc.

A variety of other reversible molecular interactions have been shown to produce color changes upon interaction with analytes. These include redox active chromo- and fluorophores which undergo specific color changes at different applied potentials. There also exists a variety of dyes such as merocyanine and azobenzene which show color changes based on the polarity of their environment. A‘push-pull’mechanism of electron density through these systems through intermolecular interactions results in augmentation of their dipole moments between ground and excited states, which manifests as observable changes to optical transition. Nanomaterials development has allowed for surface modification of certain dyes (especially redox active dyes) to afford high sensitivity due to larger surface area-to-volume ratio resulting for more active sites for analyte interaction with dyes.

=== Colorimetric chemical sensor array fabrication ===
Unlike the materials used in electronic chemical sensor arrays, in which direct interaction between the sensing material and an analyte leads to signal transduction as a change in conductivity or voltage, fabrication of colorimetric sensor arrays requires consideration of both analyte-substrate interaction and transduction of the optical signal. One method for colorimetric sensor array fabrication involves preparation of microspheres by suspending dyes into an inert, and transparent matrix. These microspheres are then incorporated into fiber optics. Other methods for fabricating colorimetric sensor arrays include printing of array fluor- and colorimetric dyes (either directly or in a nanoporous matrix) onto various substrates including paper, silica gel, or porous polymer membranes.

Inclusion of digital imaging and or illumination of optical chemical sensor array elements allows for rapid, real-time signal transduction of colorimetric data measurements in real-time of colorimetric and fluorescent data from microsphere or plated sensors. Detectors can process specific wavelengths of light, or employ RGB image processing programs to analyze data obtained from direct imaging of a sensor array. Much like electronic chemical sensor arrays, optical chemical sensor arrays are being miniaturized using microfabrication techniques to increase the applicability. Recent advancements in optical chemical sensor arrays have resulted in sensor arrays being directly integrated into flatbed scanners and mobile electronics such as smart phones (through microplate fabrication). These microplate arrays enable colorimetric analysis of complex mixtures in a variety of phases with applications in identification of toxic industrial chemicals using cross-reactive nanoporous pigments, cancer diagnosis using an array of gold nanoparticle-green fluorescent proteins, and development and assessment of combinatorial libraries of metal-dye complexes as sensors themselves.

== Other types of chemical sensor arrays ==
Although less common, there are two other classifications of devices with demonstrated functionality as chemical sensor arrays. These include wave devices and electrochemical sensors.

=== Wave devices as chemical sensor arrays ===
There are several major types of wave devices including acoustic wave devices, thickness shear mode resonators (TSM), and quartz crystal microbalances. These devices oscillate at known frequencies and their frequencies of oscillation are modulated by changes in the mass of the device. These devices may be modified with the plurality of the materials already discussed as being useful materials in chemical sensor array. All of these materials are marked by the broad compatibility of their intermolecular interactions as well as selective interactions to a variety of compounds, which when combined allow for fingerprint detection of compounds in mixtures.

Modification of wave devices with materials such as micromachined metal-oxide cantilevers coated in polymer films enable enhanced detection of mixtures of volatile organic compounds as well as hydrogen gas and mercury vapor. Bulk and surface acoustic wave devices have used in higher order sensors in which the sensing material gives rise to multiple modes for signal transduction, such as electrical and optical; additionally the same wave devices have also been used to create virtual chemical sensor arrays, in which data from one sensor component is further processed. A chemical sensor array of surface-modified quartz crystal microbalances with a variety of materials including copper phthalocyanine, single- and multi-walled carbon nanotubes was shown as a promising electronic nose for gas sensing when machine learning algorithms were employed for data processing.

=== Electrochemical sensor arrays ===
Another class of devices usable in chemical sensor arrays are electrodes. Commonly, electrochemical-based sensors are referred to as electronic tongues. Surface modification of an electrode in a multielectrode system allows for targeting of specific molecular interactions. Semipermeable membrane materials allows for electrodes to be made into sensors through their ability to selectively oxidize or reduce target analytes. One example includes, the use of an array of semipermeable membrane sensors made from potentiometric polymers like poly(vinyl chloride) have demonstrated their ability to monitor nitrate, nitrite, and ammonium concentrations in aqueous solution. Both voltametric and potentiometric methods have been developed, and this technique is an active area of research not only for multianalyte analysis of aqueous solutions such as cerebrospinal fluid, but also differentiation of redox products in electrochemical reactions.

== Examples of chemical sensor arrays with real-world uses ==
There exists a diversity of well-understood, and emerging research focused on developing chemical sensor arrays for a variety of applications. Analytical devices integrated with a chemical sensor array have been proposed as diagnostic tests for cancer, bacterial infections based on fingerprint analysis of exhaled breath, as well as for food and product quality control. A few examples include:

- Clinical trial of a chemical sensor array device made with gold nanoparticles linked with different organic ligands capable of detecting COVID-19 infections.
- The WOLF eNose is a commercially available system of chemical sensor arrays using both electronic and colorimetric sensors for the detection of volatile organic compounds, and it has been employed for detection of urinary tract infection-causing bacteria.
- The Cyranose 320 Electronic Nose is a commercially available chemical sensor array fabricated from 32 black carbon-polymer sensors capable of identifying six bacteria that cause eye infections with 96% accuracy, see Figure 4.
