= Massimo Vergassola =

Italian physicist

- Scientific career
- Fields: Physics
- Institutions: University of California, San Diego

Massimo Vergassola is an Italian physicist, who worked at the University of California, San Diego from 2013-2019. He is now a Professor at the Ecole Normale Supérieure in Paris and Directeur de Recherche at CNRS. He is Director of the ENS-PSL QBio initiative on Quantitative Biology, an initiative at the PariSanté Val-de-Grâce Campus.

Vergassola uses physics to study the sense of smell and olfactory navigation in turbulent environments. For example, he has shown the importance of a zig-zag search pattern to deal with odor plumes that have been broken into fragments due to turbulence. In 2007, Vergassola proposed a strategy called infotaxis for use by odor-sensing robots. Infotaxis involves the creation of a mental model of where an odor source is likely to be, based on previously collected information. The robot moves in a direction that will maximize information to find the smell. Early versions of the model involved a mathematical quantity called Shannon entropy, which calculates unpredictability (high in unexplored directions and low in explored directions). Another area of interest in the physics of living systems is the physics of embryonic development.

Vergassola is an Elected Fellow of the American Physical Society.
