= Synaptic transistor =

A synaptic transistor is an electrical device that can learn in ways similar to a neural synapse. It optimizes its own properties for the functions it has carried out in the past. The device mimics the behavior of the property of neurons called spike-timing-dependent plasticity, or STDP.

== Structure ==
Its structure is similar to that of a field effect transistor, where an ionic liquid takes the place of the gate insulating layer between the gate electrode and the conducting channel. That channel is composed of samarium nickelate (SmNiO_{3}, or SNO) rather than the field effect transistor's doped silicon.

== Function ==
A synaptic transistor has a traditional immediate response whose amount of current that passes between the source and drain contacts varies with voltage applied to the gate electrode. It also produces a much slower learned response such that the conductivity of the SNO layer varies in response to the transistor's STDP history, essentially by shuttling oxygen ions between the SNO and the ionic liquid.

The analog of strengthening a synapse is to increase the SNO's conductivity, which essentially increases gain. Similarly, weakening a synapse is analogous to decreasing the SNO's conductivity, lowering the gain.

The input and output of the synaptic transistor are continuous analog values, rather than digital on-off signals. While the physical structure of the device has the potential to learn from history, it contains no way to bias the transistor to control the memory effect. An external supervisory circuit converts the time delay between input and output into a voltage applied to the ionic liquid that either drives ions into the SNO or removes them.

A network of such devices can learn particular responses to "sensory inputs", with those responses being learned through experience rather than explicitly programmed.
