= Chemiresistor =

Material with changing electrical resistance according to its surroundings

Simplified schematic of a single gap chemiresistive sensor. (not to scale)

A chemiresistor is a material that changes its electrical resistance in response to changes in the nearby chemical environment. Chemiresistors are a class of chemical sensors that rely on the direct chemical interaction between the sensing material and the analyte. The sensing material and the analyte can interact by covalent bonding, hydrogen bonding, or molecular recognition. Several different materials have chemiresistor properties: semiconducting metal oxides, some conductive polymers, and nanomaterials like graphene, carbon nanotubes and nanoparticles. Typically these materials are used as partially selective sensors in devices like electronic tongues or electronic noses.

A basic chemiresistor consists of a sensing material that bridges the gap between two electrodes or coats a set of interdigitated electrodes. The resistance between the electrodes can be easily measured. The sensing material has an inherent resistance that can be modulated by the presence or absence of the analyte. During exposure, analytes interact with the sensing material. These interactions cause changes in the resistance reading. In some chemiresistors the resistance changes simply indicate the presence of analyte. In others, the resistance changes are proportional to the amount of analyte present; this allows for the amount of analyte present to be measured.

== History ==
As far back as 1965 there are reports of semiconductor materials exhibiting electrical conductivities that are strongly affected by ambient gases and vapours. However, it was not until 1985 that Wohltjen and Snow coined the term chemiresistor. The chemiresistive material they investigated was copper phthalocyanine, and they demonstrated that its resistivity decreased in the presence of ammonia vapour at room temperature.

In recent years chemiresistor technology has been used to develop sensors for many applications, including conductive polymer sensors for secondhand smoke, carbon nanotube sensors for gaseous ammonia, and metal oxide sensors for hydrogen gas. The ability of chemiresistors to provide accurate real-time information about the environment through small devices that require minimal electricity makes them an addition to the internet of things.

== Types of chemiresistor sensors ==
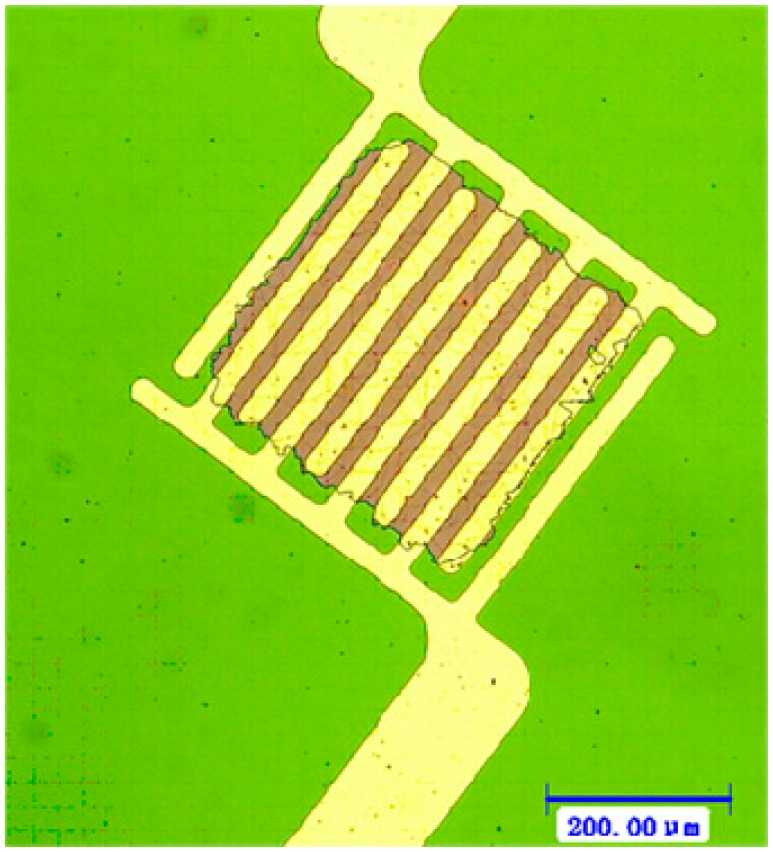
An oxygen sensing TiO_{2} film on an interdigitated electrode.

=== Device architectures ===
Chemiresistors can be made by coating an interdigitated electrode with a thin film or by using a thin film or other sensing material to bridge the single gap between two electrodes. Electrodes are typically made of conductive metals such as gold and chromium which make good ohmic contact with thin films. In both architectures, the sensing material controls the conductance between the two electrodes; however, each device architecture has its own advantages and disadvantages.

Interdigitated electrodes allow for a greater amount of the film's surface area to be in contact with the electrode. This allows for more electrical connections to be made and increases the overall conductivity of the system. Interdigitated electrodes with finger sizes and finger spacing on the order of microns are difficult to manufacture and require the use of photolithography. Larger features are easier to fabricate and can be manufactured using techniques such as thermal evaporation. Both interdigitated electrode and single-gap systems can be arranged in parallel to allow for the detection of multiple analytes by one device.

=== Sensing materials ===
==== Semiconducting metal oxides ====
Metal oxide chemiresistor sensors were first commercialized in 1970 in a carbon monoxide detector that used powdered SnO_{2}. However, there are many other metal oxides that have chemiresistive properties. Metal oxide sensors are primarily gas sensors, and they can sense both oxidizing and reducing gases. This makes them ideal for use in industrial situations where gases used in manufacturing can pose a risk to worker safety.

Sensors made from metal oxides require high temperatures (200 °C or higher) to operate because, in order for the resistivity to change, an activation energy must be overcome.

Metal oxide chemiresistors
Metal oxide	Vapours
Chromium titanium oxide	H_{2}S
Gallium oxide	O_{2}, CO
Indium oxide	O_{3}
Molybdenum oxide	NH_{3}
Tin oxide	reducing gases
Tungsten oxide	NO_{2}
Zinc oxide	hydrocarbons, O_{2}

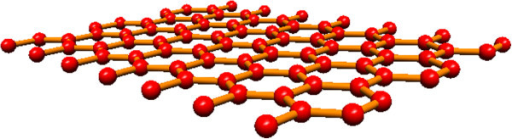
A graphene monolayer.

==== Graphene ====
In comparison to the other materials graphene chemiresistor sensors are relatively new but have shown excellent sensitivity. Graphene is an allotrope of carbon that consists of a single layer of graphite. It has been used in sensors to detect vapour-phase molecules, pH, proteins, bacteria, and simulated chemical warfare agents.

==== Carbon nanotubes ====
The first published report of nanotubes being used as chemiresistors was made in 2000. Since then there has been research into chemiresistors and chemically sensitive field effect transistors fabricated from individual single-walled nanotubes, bundles of single-walled nanotubes, bundles of multi-walled nanotubes, and carbon nanotube–polymer mixtures. It has been shown that a chemical species can alter the resistance of a bundle of single-walled carbon nanotubes through multiple mechanisms.

Carbon nanotubes are useful sensing materials because they have low detection limits, and quick response times; however, bare carbon nanotube sensors are not very selective. They can respond to the presence of many different gases from gaseous ammonia to diesel fumes. Carbon nanotube sensors can be made more selective by using a polymer as a barrier, doping the nanotubes with heteroatoms, or adding functional groups to the surface of the nanotubes.

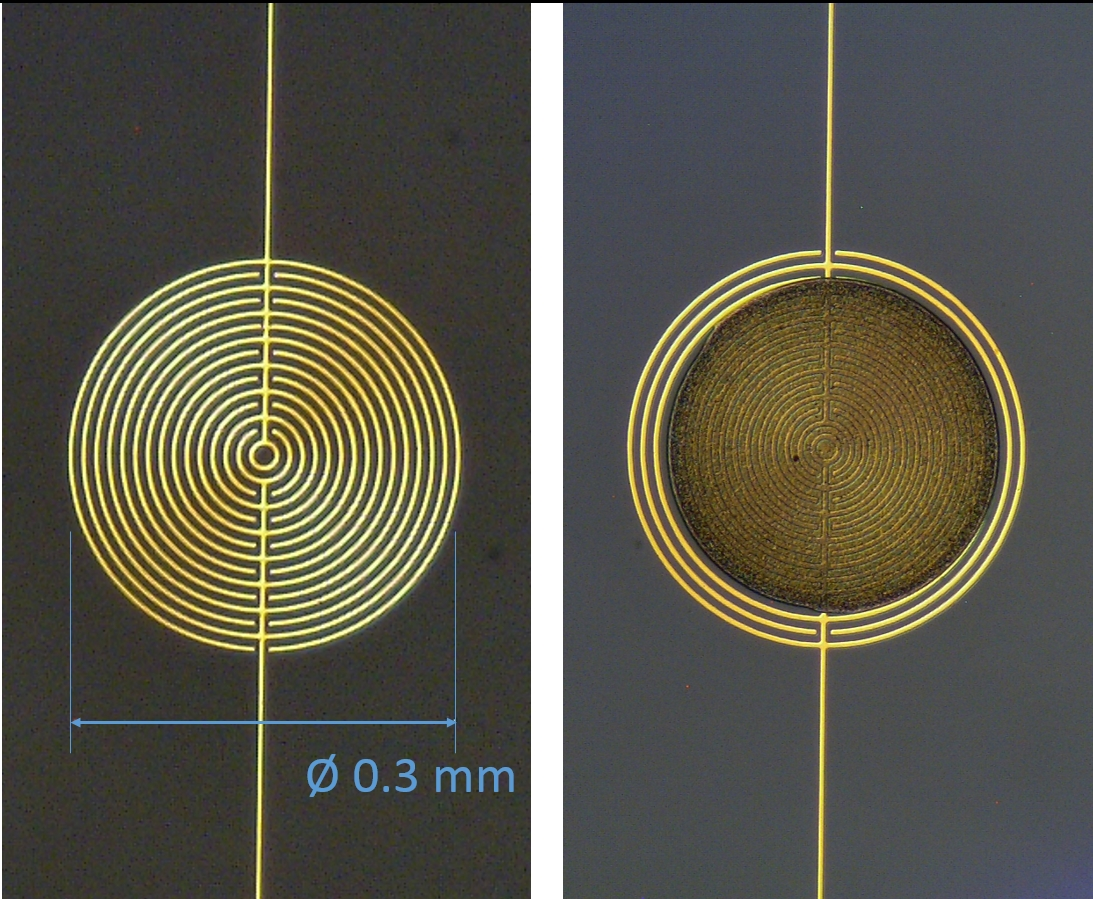
Circular interdigitated electrodes with and without a gold nanoparticle chemiresistor film

.

==== Nanoparticles ====
Many different nanoparticles of varying size, structure and composition have been incorporated into chemiresistor sensors. The most commonly used are thin films of gold nanoparticles coated with self-assembled monolayers (SAMs) of organic molecules. The SAM is critical in defining some of the nanoparticle assembly's properties. Firstly, the stability of the gold nanoparticles depends upon the integrity of the SAM, which prevents them from sintering together. Secondly, the SAM of organic molecules defines the separation between the nanoparticles, e.g. longer molecules cause the nanoparticles to have a wider average separation. The width of this separation defines the barrier that electrons must tunnel through when a voltage is applied and electric current flows. Thus by defining the average distance between individual nanoparticles the SAM also defines the electrical resistivity of the nanoparticle assembly. Finally, the SAMs form a matrix around the nanoparticles that chemical species can diffuse into. As new chemical species enter the matrix it changes the inter-particle separation which in turn affects the electrical resistance. Analytes diffuse into the SAMs at proportions defined by their partition coefficient and this characterizes the selectivity and sensitivity of the chemiresistor material.

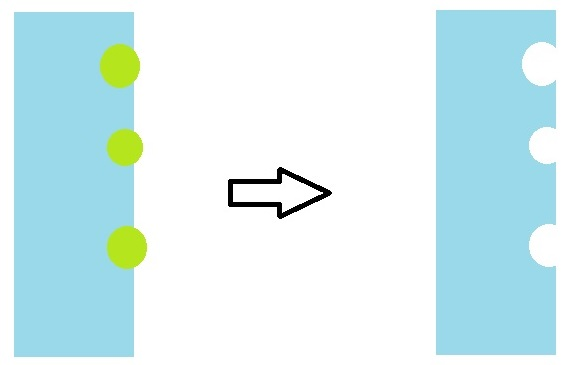
Polymerization of a polymer around a target molecule that is then washed out to leave shaped cavities behind.

==== Conductive polymers ====
Conductive polymers such as polyaniline and polypyrrole can be used as sensing materials when the target interacts directly with the polymer chain resulting in a change in conductivity of the polymer. These types of systems lack selectivity due to the wide range of target molecules that can interact with the polymer. Molecularly imprinted polymers can add selectivity to conductive polymer chemiresistors. A molecularly imprinted polymer is made by polymerizing a polymer around a target molecule and then removing the target molecule from the polymer leaving behind cavities matching the size and shape of the target molecule. Molecularly imprinting the conductive polymer increases the sensitivity of the chemiresistor by selecting for the target's general size and shape as well as its ability to interact with the chain of the conductive polymer.

== See also ==
- Chemical field-effect transistor
