= Electronic nose =

Electronic sensor for odor detection

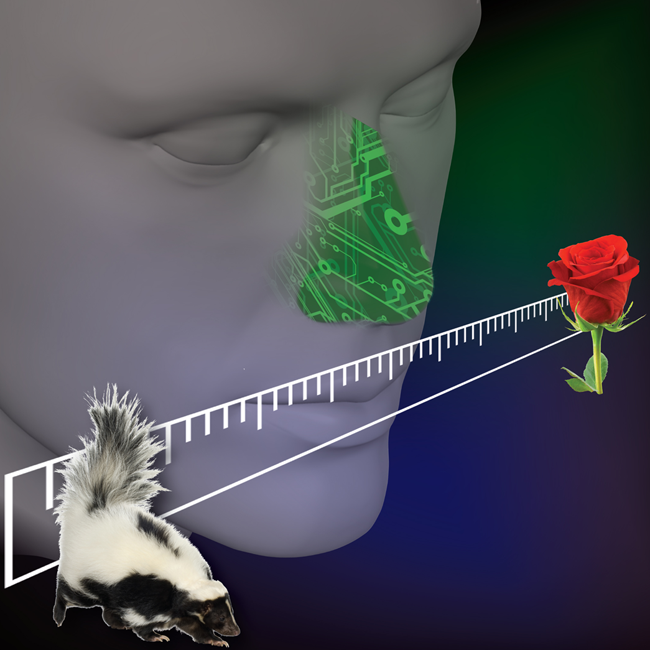
An electronic nose was tuned to the perceptual axis of odorant pleasantness, i.e., an axis ranging from very pleasant (e.g., rose) to very unpleasant (e.g., skunk). This allowed the eNose to then smell novel odorants it never encountered before, yet still generate odor pleasantness estimates in high agreement with human assessments regardless of the subject's cultural background. This suggests an innate component of odorant pleasantness that is tightly linked to molecular structure

An electronic nose (or eNose) is an electronic sensing device intended to detect odors or flavors. The expression "electronic sensing" refers to the capability of reproducing human senses using sensor arrays and pattern recognition systems.

Since 1982, research has been conducted to develop technologies, commonly referred to as electronic noses, that could detect and recognize odors and flavors. The stages of the recognition process are similar to human olfaction and are performed for identification, comparison, quantification and other applications, including data storage and retrieval. Some such devices are used for industrial purposes.

== Techniques to analyze odors ==
In all industries, odor assessment is usually performed by human sensory analysis, by chemosensors, or by gas chromatography. The latter technique gives information about volatile organic compounds but the correlation between analytical results and mean odor perception is not direct due to potential interactions between several odorous components.

In the Wasp Hound odor detector, the mechanical element is a video camera and the biological element is five parasitic wasps who have been conditioned to swarm in response to the presence of a specific chemical.

== History ==
Scientist Alexander Graham Bell popularized the notion that it was difficult to measure a smell, and in 1914 said the following:

Did you ever measure a smell? Can you tell whether one smell is just twice strong as another? Can you measure the difference between two kinds of smell and another? It is very obvious that we have very many different kinds of smells, all the way from the odour of violets and roses up to asafetida. But until you can measure their likeness and differences, you can have no science of odour. If you are ambitious to find a new science, measure a smell.

— Alexander Graham Bell, 1914

In the decades since Bell made this observation, no such science of odor materialised, and it was not until the 1950s and beyond that any real progress was made. A common problem for odor-detecting is that it does not involve measuring energy, but physical particles.

== Working principle ==
The electronic nose was developed in order to mimic human olfaction that functions as a non-separative mechanism: i.e. an odor / flavor is perceived as a global fingerprint. Essentially the instrument consists of head space sampling, a chemical sensor array, and pattern recognition modules, to generate signal patterns that are used for characterizing odors.

Electronic noses include three major parts: a sample delivery system, a detection system, a computing system.

The sample delivery system enables the generation of the headspace (volatile compounds) of a sample, which is the fraction analyzed. The system then injects this headspace into the detection system of the electronic nose. The sample delivery system is essential to guarantee constant operating conditions.

The detection system, which consists of a sensor set, is the "reactive" part of the instrument. When in contact with volatile compounds, the sensors react, which means they experience a change of electrical properties.

In most electronic noses, each sensor is sensitive to all volatile molecules but each in their specific way. However, in bio-electronic noses, receptor proteins which respond to specific odor molecules are used. Most electronic noses use chemical sensor arrays that react to volatile compounds on contact: the adsorption of volatile compounds on the sensor surface causes a physical change of the sensor. A specific response is recorded by the electronic interface transforming the signal into a digital value. Recorded data are then computed based on statistical models.

Bio-electronic noses use olfactory receptors – proteins cloned from biological organisms, e.g. humans, that bind to specific odor molecules. One group has developed a bio-electronic nose that mimics the signaling systems used by the human nose to perceive odors at a very high sensitivity: femtomolar concentrations.

The more commonly used sensors for electronic noses include

- metal–oxide–semiconductor (MOS) devices – metal–oxide–semiconductor sensors contain a metal oxide coating with an electrical resistance that changes in the presence of a target gas. The presence of the target gas can be inferred by measuring the change in the resistance of the metal oxide layer over time.
- conducting polymers – organic polymers that conduct electricity.
- polymer composites – similar in use to conducting polymers but formulated of non-conducting polymers with the addition of conducting material such as carbon black.
- quartz crystal microbalance (QCM) – a way of measuring mass per unit area by measuring the change in frequency of a quartz crystal resonator. This can be stored in a database and used for future reference.
- surface acoustic wave (SAW) – a class of microelectromechanical systems (MEMS) which rely on the modulation of surface acoustic waves to sense a physical phenomenon.
- Mass spectrometers can be miniaturised to form general purpose gas analysis devices.

Some devices combine multiple sensor types in a single device, for example polymer coated QCMs. The independent information leads to vastly more sensitive and efficient devices. Studies of airflow around canine noses, and tests on lifesize models have indicated that a cyclic 'sniffing action' similar to that of a real dog is beneficial in terms of improved range and speed of response.

In recent years, other types of electronic noses have been developed that utilize mass spectrometry or ultra-fast gas chromatography as a detection system.

The computing system works to combine the responses of all of the sensors, which represents the input for the data treatment. This part of the instrument performs global fingerprint analysis and provides results and representations that can be easily interpreted. Moreover, the electronic nose results can be correlated to those obtained from other techniques (sensory panel, GC, GC/MS). Many of the data interpretation systems are used for the analysis of results. These systems include artificial neural network (ANN), fuzzy logic, chemometrics methods, pattern recognition modules, etc. Artificial intelligence, including artificial neural networks, is a key technique for the environmental odour management.

== Performing an analysis ==
As a first step, an electronic nose needs to be trained with qualified samples so as to build a database of reference. Then the instrument can recognize new samples by comparing a volatile compound's fingerprint to those contained in its database. Thus they can perform qualitative or quantitative analysis. This however may also cause a problem as many odors are made up of multiple different molecules, which may be wrongly interpreted by the device as it will register them as different compounds, resulting in incorrect or inaccurate results depending on the primary function of a nose. The example of e-nose dataset is also available. This dataset can be used as a reference for e-nose signal processing, notably for meat quality studies. The two main objectives of this dataset are multiclass beef classification and microbial population prediction by regression. For diseases such as lung cancer multiple types of analysis have been used.

== Applications ==
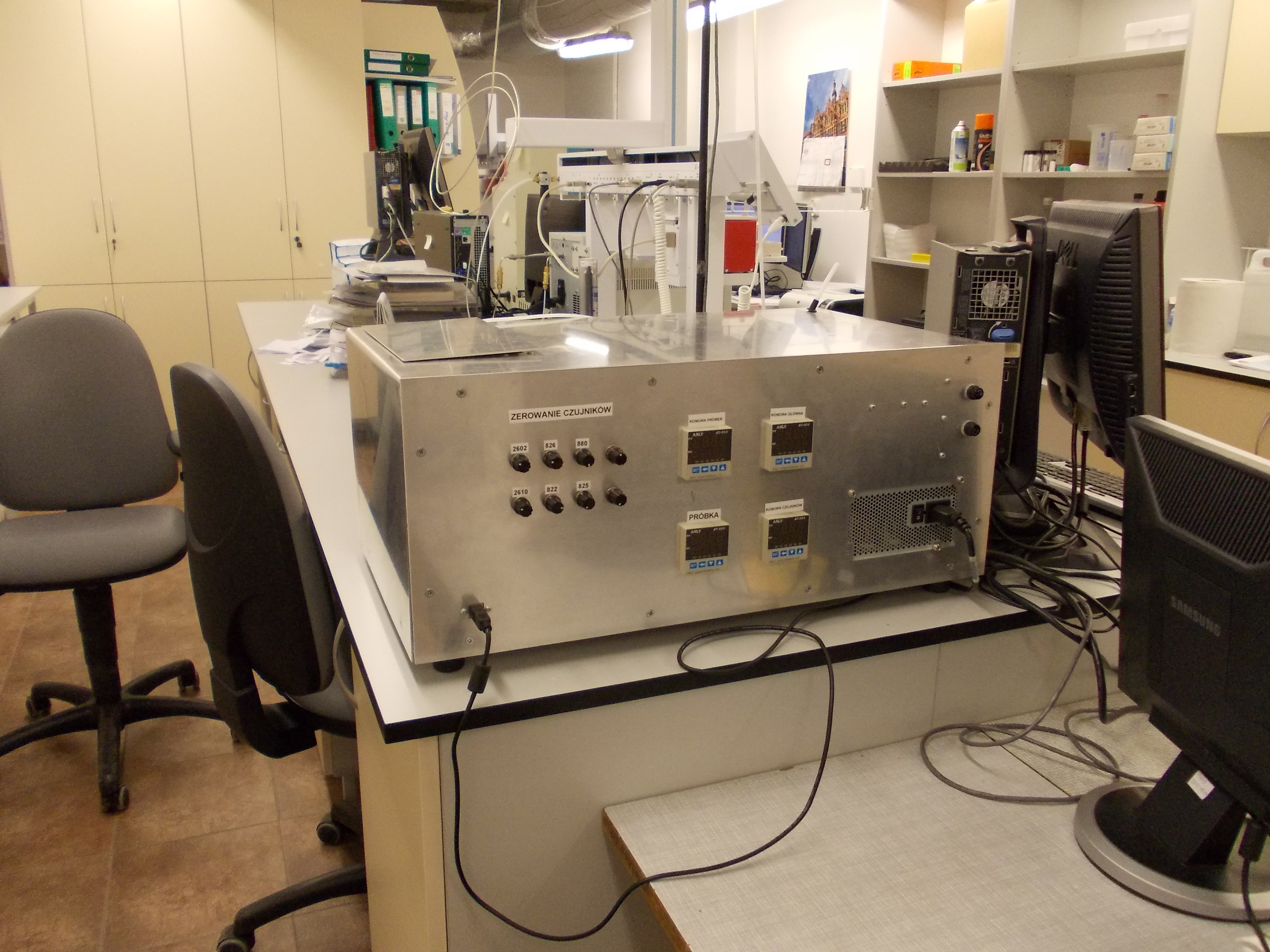
Electronic nose developed in Analytical Chemistry Department (Chemical Faculty of Gdańsk University of Technology) allows for rapid classification of food or environmental samples

Electronic nose instruments are used by research and development laboratories, quality control laboratories and process & production departments for various purposes:

=== In quality control laboratories ===
- Conformity of raw materials, intermediate and final products
- Batch to batch consistency
- Detection of contamination, spoilage, adulteration
- Origin or vendor selection
- Monitoring of storage conditions
- Meat quality monitoring.

=== In process and production departments ===
- Managing raw material variability
- Comparison with a reference product
- Measurement and comparison of the effects of manufacturing process on products
- Following-up cleaning in place process efficiency
- Scale-up monitoring
- Cleaning in place monitoring.

=== In product development phases ===
- Sensory profiling and comparison of various formulations or recipes
- Benchmarking of competitive products
- Evaluation of the impact of a change of process or ingredient on sensory features.

=== Possible and future applications in the fields of health and security ===
- The detection of dangerous and harmful bacteria, such as software that has been specifically developed to recognise the smell of the MRSA (Methicillin-resistant Staphylococcus aureus). It is also able to recognise methicillinsusceptible S. aureus (MSSA) among many other substances. It has been theorised that if carefully placed in hospital ventilation systems, it could detect and therefore prevent contamination of other patients or equipment by many highly contagious pathogens.
- The detection of lung cancer or other medical conditions by detecting the VOC's (volatile organic compounds) that indicate the medical condition.
- The detection of viral and bacterial infections in COPD exacerbations.
- The quality control of food products as it could be conveniently placed in food packaging to clearly indicate when food has started to rot or used in the field to detect bacterial or insect contamination.
- Nasal implants could warn of the presence of natural gas, for those who had anosmia or a weak sense of smell.
- The Brain Mapping Foundation used the electronic nose to detect brain cancer cells.

=== Possible and future applications in the field of crime prevention and security ===
- The ability of the electronic nose to detect odorless smells makes it ideal for use in the police force, such as the ability to detect bomb odors despite other airborne odors capable of confusing police dogs.
- It may also be used as a drug detection method in airports. Through careful placement of several or more electronic noses and effective computer systems, one could triangulate the location of drugs to within a few metres of their location in less than a few seconds.
- Demonstration systems that detect the vapours given off by explosives exist, but are currently some way behind a well trained sniffer dog.

=== In environmental monitoring ===
- For identification of volatile organic compounds in air, water and soil samples.
- For environmental protection.

Various application notes describe analysis in areas such as flavor and fragrance, food and beverage, packaging, pharmaceutical, cosmetic and perfumes, and chemical companies. More recently they can also address public concerns in terms of olfactive nuisance monitoring with networks of on-field devices. Since emission rates on a site can be extremely variable for some sources, the electronic nose can provide a tool to track fluctuations and trends and assess the situation in real time. It improves understanding of critical sources, leading to pro-active odor management. Real time modeling will present the current situation, allowing the operator to understand which periods and conditions are putting the facility at risk. Also, existing commercial systems can be programmed to have active alerts based on set points (odor concentration modeled at receptors/alert points or odor concentration at a nose/source) to initiate appropriate actions.

== See also ==
- Chemical field-effect transistor
- Chemiresistor
- Electronic skin
- Electronic tongue
- Fluctuation-enhanced sensing
- Machine olfaction
- Odor source localization
- Olfactometer
