= Electronic tongue =

Instrument that measures and compares tastes

Overview
- Type: Chemical sensor array / analytical instrument
- Also known as: E-tongue
- Measures: Taste (sourness, saltiness, bitterness, sweetness, umami)
- Detection method: Voltammetric and potentiometric sensor response
- Sample types: Liquids (direct); solids (after dissolution)

Applications
- Industries: Pharmaceutical, food & beverage, environmental monitoring
- Related concepts: Electronic nose, Taste receptor, Pattern recognition

The electronic tongue is an instrument that measures and compares tastes. As per the IUPAC technical report, an “electronic tongue” is an analytical instrument including an array of non-selective chemical sensors with partial specificity to different solution components and an appropriate pattern recognition instrument, capable of recognizing quantitative and qualitative compositions of simple and complex solutions

Chemical compounds responsible for taste are detected by human taste receptors. Similarly, the multi-electrode sensors of electronic instruments detect the same dissolved organic and inorganic compounds. Like human receptors, each sensor has a spectrum of reactions different from the other. The information given by each sensor is complementary, and the combination of all sensors' results generates a unique fingerprint. Most of the detection thresholds of sensors are similar to or better than human receptors.

In the biological mechanism, taste signals are transduced by nerves in the brain into electric signals. E-tongue sensors process is similar: they generate electric signals as voltammetric and potentiometric variations.

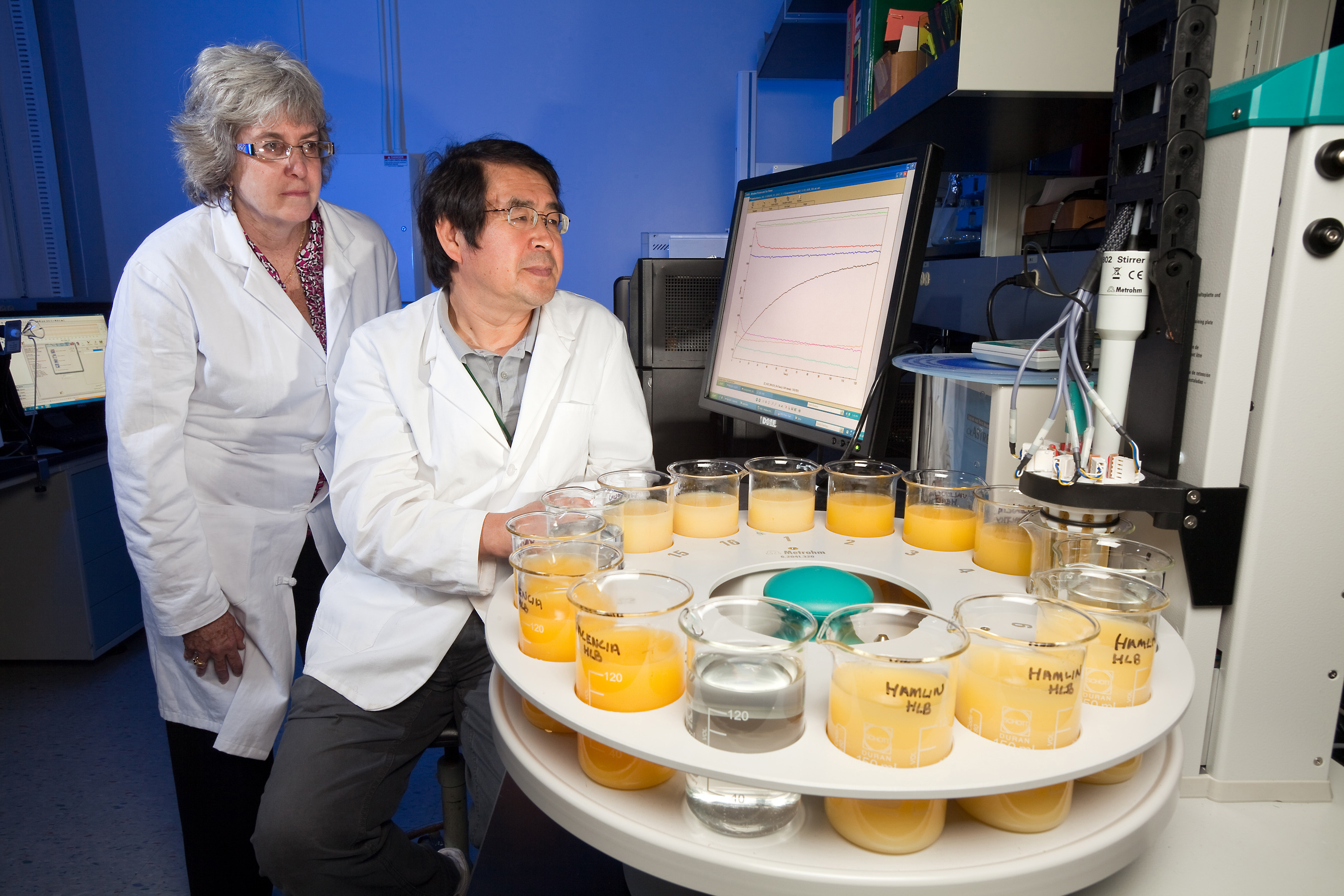
Researchers from the Agricultural Research Service use an electronic tongue.

Taste quality perception and recognition are based on the building or recognition of activated sensory nerve patterns by the brain and the taste fingerprint of the product. This step is achieved by the e-tongue's statistical software, which interprets the sensor data into taste patterns.

== Operation ==
Liquid samples are directly analyzed without any preparation, whereas solids require a preliminary dissolution before measurement. Reference electrode and sensors are dipped in a beaker containing a test solution. A voltage is applied between each sensor and a reference electrode, and a measurable current response results that is consistent with the Cottrell equation. This current response is a result of oxidizing reactions that take place in the solution due to the voltage difference and can be amplified through catalytic surface treatments. The response is measured and recorded by the e-tongue's software. These data represent the input for mathematical treatment that will deliver results.

== Applications ==
Electronic tongues have several applications in various industrial areas: the pharmaceutical industry, food and beverage sector, etc. It can be used to:

- analyze flavor aging in beverages (for instance fruit juice, alcoholic or non alcoholic drinks, flavored milk...)
- quantify bitterness or “spicy level” of drinks or dissolved compounds (e.g. bitterness measurement and prediction of teas)
- estimation of theaflavins in black tea
- quantify taste masking efficiency of formulations (tablets, syrups, powders, capsules, lozenges...)
- analyze medicines stability in terms of taste
- benchmark target products
- monitor environmental parameters
- monitor biological and biochemical processes

== Artificial taste ==
The electronic tongue uses taste sensors to receive information from chemicals on the tongue and send it to a pattern recognition system. The result is the detection of the tastes that compose the human palate. The types of taste that are generated are divided into five categories sourness, saltiness, bitterness, sweetness, and umami (savoriness). Sourness, which includes hydrogen chloride, acetic acid, and citric acid, is created by hydrogen ions. Saltiness is registered as sodium chloride, sweetness by sugars, bitterness, which includes chemicals such as quinine and caffeine is detected through magnesium chloride, and umami by monosodium glutamate from seaweed, or disodium guanylate in meat/fish/mushrooms.

== See also ==
- Electronic nose
- Chemical field-effect transistor
- Chemiresistor
- Gustation
- Metal oxide sensors
