= Trummen =

Lake Trummen
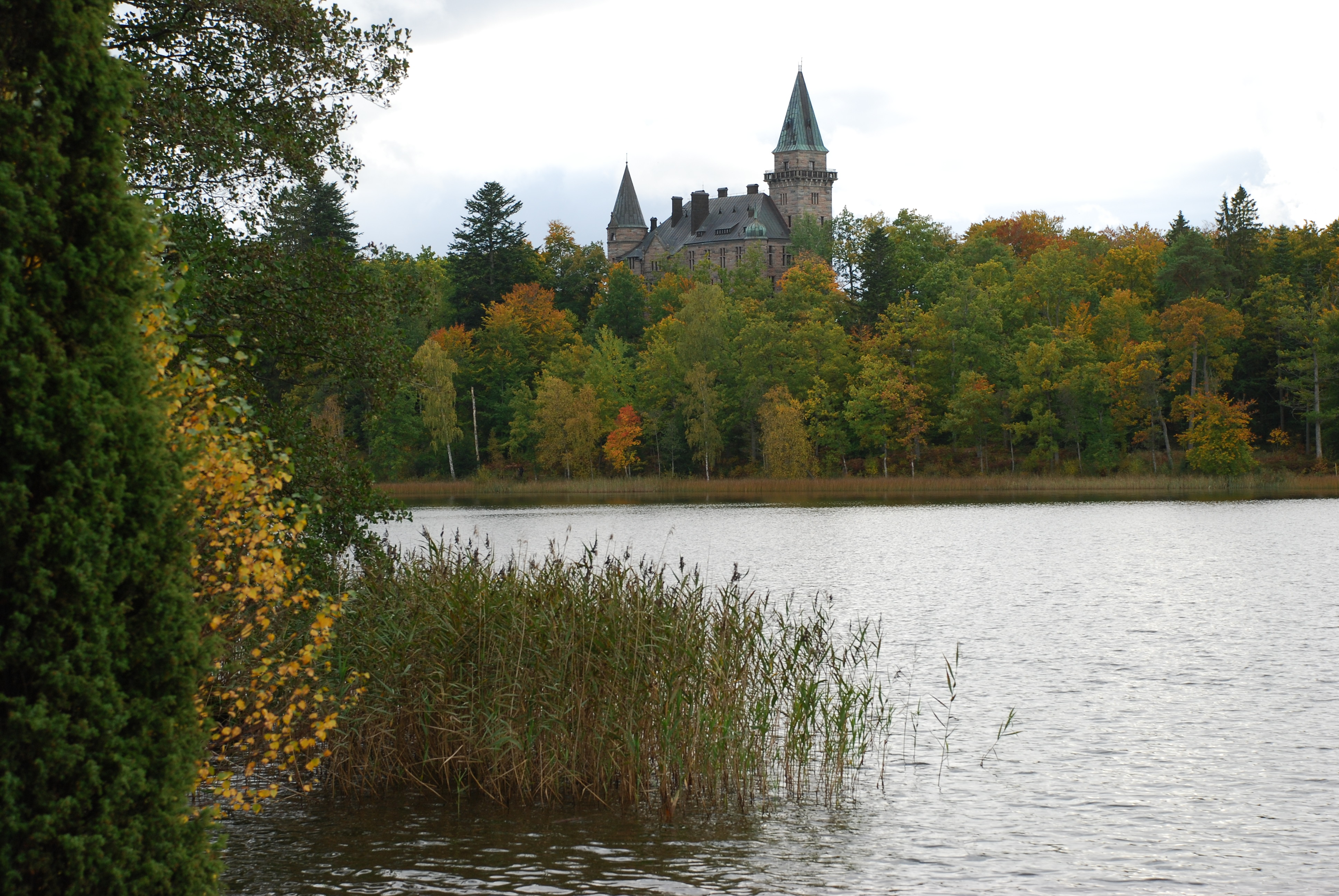
- Teleborgs Castle seen from lake Trummen

- Location within Sweden
- Location: Växjö Municipality, Kronoberg County, Sweden
- Coordinates: 56°51′40″N 14°49′45″E
- Type: lake
- Surface area: 75 hectares (190 acres)
- Surface elevation: 161.2 metres (529 ft)

Trummen is a lake in Växjö Municipality, Kronoberg County, Sweden. It covers approximately 75 hectares (190 acres), and sits 161.2 metres (529 ft) above sea level. It is near Teleborg Castle, Linnaeus University, and Sankt Sigfrids Hospital.
