= Klaus Mosbach =

Swedish biochemist (1932–2024)

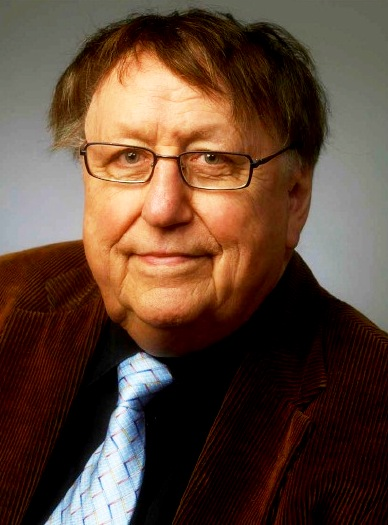
- Born: 26 November 1932; Leipzig, Saxony, Germany
- Died: 22 January 2024 (aged 91); Malmö, Sweden
- Occupation: Swedish Applied biochemist

Klaus Hermann Mosbach (26 November 1932 – 22 January 2024) was a Swedish applied biochemist based at Lund University. He founded the Center for Molecular Imprinting in Lund, Sweden and was co-founder of the Institute of biotechnology at ETH Zurich Switzerland 1982. He was a great visionary who gave shape to the modern era of Molecular imprinting for which he was awarded the plaque at the international meeting of molecular imprinting in 2010 in New Orleans, United States.

== Biography ==
Born	1932, Leipzig, Germany
Died	2024, Malmö, Sweden
Citizenship	Swedish.
Field	Biochemistry.
Institution	Lund University, Sweden.
other Institution	ETH Zurich.
Known for	Molecular imprinting, Enzyme immobilization, Affinity chromatography
Notable awards	Enzyme engineering award by Engineering foundation, USA. Gold medalist of Royal Swedish Academy of Engineering Sciences. Pierce Award by International organization of Affinity chromatography and Biorecognition. He was a great visionary who gave shape to the modern era of Molecular imprinting for which he has been awarded the plaque at the international meeting of molecular imprinting in 2010 in New Orleans, United States of America.

== Early life and education ==
Klaus Mosbach was born in Leipzig, Germany. Family status: Married to May E., three daughters (Petra, Katja, Vanja). Klaus Mosbach went to school in Leipzig Germany and Lund, Sweden, In 1952 he moved to London, where he took Cambridge and interpreter exams. After working in a pharmaceutical company, Ferrosan in Malmö, Sweden, he began his university studies at Lund University 1953. In 1956 he took his master's degree in chemistry and biology and subsequently in 1960 his Ph.D. in biochemistry with a thesis on "the biosynthesis of aromatic compounds in fungi and lichens". He was then awarded the Waksman-Merck post-doctoral fellowship and stayed for 1.5 years at the Institute of Microbiology, Rutgers University, N.J., USA... In 1962 he developed, jointly with Dr. Schaffner in the Philippines, a pasteurization process against Salmonella infections in coconuts, which subsequently was approved by the Food and Drug Administration and is presently used. After returning to Sweden, he continued his studies on secondary metabolism. He received his second Ph.D. (corresponding to associate professorship or "Habilitation") from the University of Lund in 1964. Until 1970 he was associate professor there, and from 1970 onwards he has been full professor and head of the Department of Pure and Applied Biochemistry, which he founded, at Lund Institute of Technology. He also co-founded the Department of biotechnology at the Swiss Federal Institute of Technology ETH Zurich, Switzerland, in 1982.

== Positions held ==
Professor Mosbach had leaves to take advantage of the following positions

- 1962 Waksman Merck postdoc fellowship, USA.
- 1967 Humboldt assistant professorship stipend at the Max-Planck Institute, Munich, Germany.
- 1970 visiting professorship at the Weizmann Institute of Science, Rehovot, Israel.
- 1973 guest professorship in Dallas, Texas, USA.
- 1978 guest professorship (Japan Society for the Promotion of Science) in Japan.
- 1982–1986 Full Professor (Ordinarius) in biotechnology at The Federal Institute of technology, ETH Zurich, Switzerland.
- 1993 honorary visiting professorship in biochemistry at the University of Bath, UK.
- 1995 honorary visiting professorship in biochemistry at the Université Catholique de Louvain, Louvain-la-Neuve, Belgium.

During these stays he collaborated with Nobel Prize winners Lynen, Waksman as well as with Professors Estabrook and Srere, Katchalski-Katzir and Wilchek, Fukui, Chibata, Suzuki, Rees and Creighton respectively.

== Co-Workers ==
Klaus Mosbach supervised more than sixty Ph.D.’s over the years. A number of highly recognized scientists emerged from this pool, including the following professors C. Borrebaeck (in part), B.Sellergren (who is now a professor in Germany). P. Brodelius, Leif Bulow, B. Danielsson, B. Hahn-Hägerdahl (in part), A.C. Koch. Schmidt, P.O. Larsson, C. F. Mandenius, B. Mattiasson, M.O. Månsson, I.A. Nicholls (starting as post doc), R. Ohlsson (in part), Lei Ye and S. Olsson working all in Sweden. To this a number of Professors working in other countries outside Sweden including, L.Fischer, K. Haupt, C.Lowe, H.Zhang, Deepak Chandrasekaran.

Mosbach collaborated with numerous companies over the years, including Biogen and later Hybritech, Eli Lilly, Igen, Hofman la Roche and was involved in the formation of start-up companies by himself likewise former students of him have been successful in starting up companies like B.Ekberg, N.Siegbahn, Kurt Nilsson, Kjell Nilsson, Dariao Kriz.

== Selected awards ==
- From 1981 member of the European Molecular Biology Organization (EMBO).
- From 1982 honorary member of the American Society for Biochemistry and Molecular Biology.
- Received the Arrhenius Medal in 1983.
- From 1985 member of the Protein Society, USA.
- 1985 he was awarded two highly esteemed international scientific prizes given every second year, covering different major areas in biotechnology/biochemistry) as listed below:

1. In Enzyme Engineering by the Engineering Foundation, New York, USA, "in recognition of outstanding contributions to the field of enzyme engineering".(previous winners: Dr. Chibata, subsequent to him Professors Katchalski-Katzir, Fukui, Klibanov, Lilly, Kula/Wandrey (jointly)).
2. For "important contributions in the field of affinity chromatography" by the International Organization on Affinity Chromatography and Biorecognition (first winner K. Mosbach followed by M. Wilchek (1989), C.R. Lowe (1991), I.M. Chaiken (1993), J. Porath (1995), Regnier/Uhlén (1997) (jointly), Kasai (1999) and Vijayalaksmi (2001)...

- In 1990 he was awarded the gold medal of the Royal Swedish Academy of Engineering Sciences for his contribution to biotechnology, especially on the immobilization of bioactive substances.
- In 1993 he was awarded the research prize by the Swedish Fund for "Research without Animal Experiments".
- In April 1999, Biogen Inc., together with its early members including Klaus Mosbach, received the US National Gold Medal of Technology. The recipient of this award was selected by the Department of Commerce and presented by the president William J. Clinton.
- In October 2002 at the International Symposium on Chromatography in London, Klaus Mosbach was presented the Martin Gold Medal, at the Royal Society, for the year 2000, by the Executive Committee of the Chromatographic Society. It was awarded him "in recognition of his major contributions to the field of separation science over many years". Previous recipients of this award are inter alia F. Regnier (1993), C. Horvath (1994) and W.H. Pirkle (1990).
- Mosbach published more than 537 peer reviewed scientific articles and reviews with an H-Index of 77.
- Mosbach wrote and edited four volumes of methods in enzymology series on Immobilized Enzymes, by Academic press (44,132,133,134).
- In addition he has received and applied for 84 patents.
