= Sergey Piletsky =

Professor of bio analytical chemistry

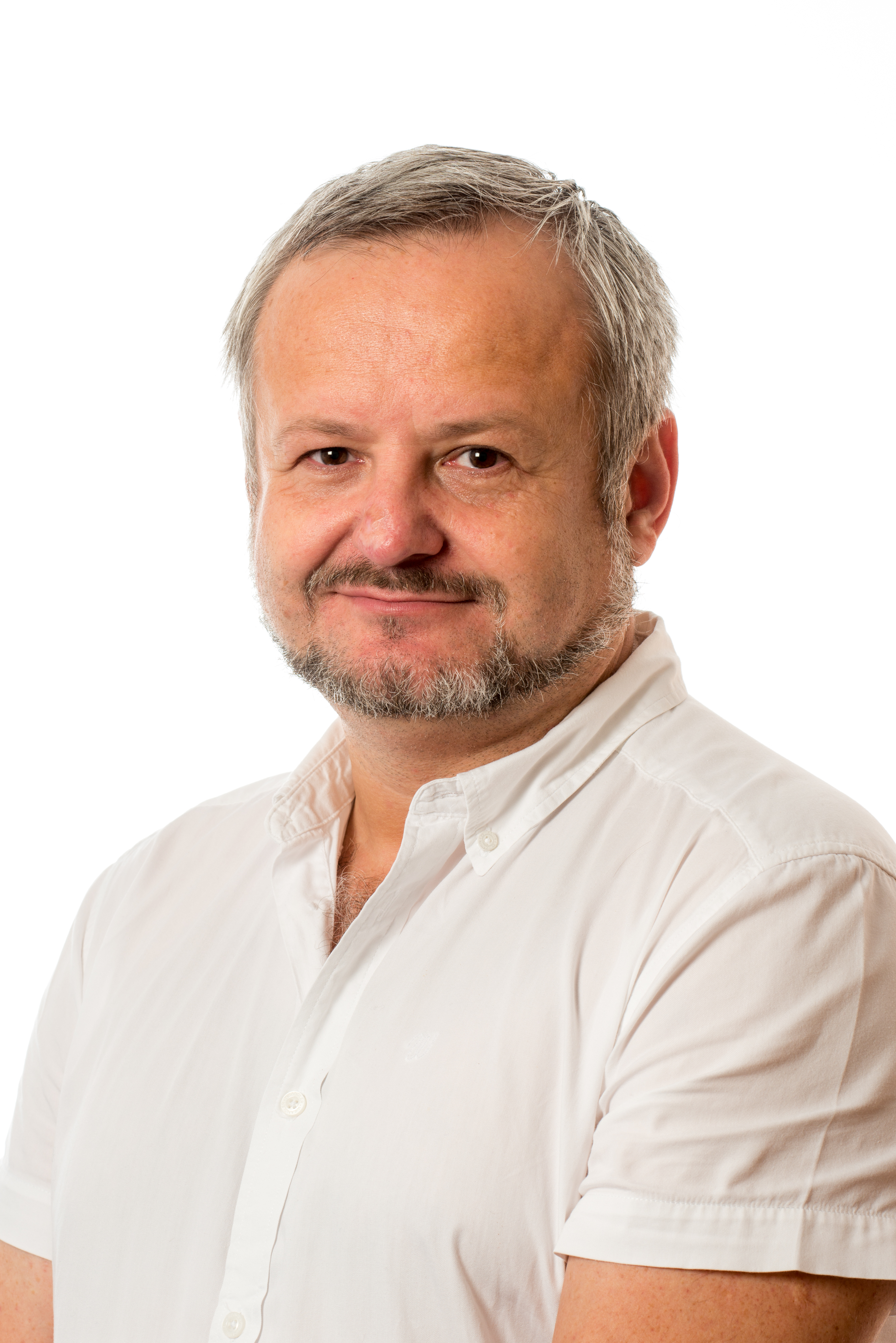
- Education: PhD, DSc
- Alma mater: Kyiv University, Cranfield University
- Occupation: Professor
- Employer: Leicester University
- Known for: Biosensors; Molecularly imprinted polymers; Computational design of molecular imprinting
- Awards: Royal Society Wolfson Research Merit Award, Leverhulme Trust Fellowship, DFG Fellowship Institute of Analytical Chemistry, Award of President of Ukraine, Japan Society for Promotion of Science and Technology Fellowship
- Website: https://le.ac.uk/people/sergey-piletsky

Sergey Piletsky is a Ukrainian born British professor of Bioanalytical Chemistry and the Research Director for School of Chemistry, University of Leicester, United Kingdom.

== Education ==
Sergey graduated from Kyiv University, Ukraine, obtaining an MSc in chemistry in 1985 and researched on synthesis of the polymers selective for nucleic acids, for which he was awarded with a PhD in 1991. Cranfield University awarded Sergey with a DSc for his work on molecularly imprinted polymers for diagnostics applications.

== Awards ==
Sergey is a recipient of Royal Society Wolfson Research Merit Award, Leverhulme Trust Fellowship, DFG Fellowship from the Institute of Analytical Chemistry, Award of President of Ukraine, and Japan Society for Promotion of Science and Technology Fellowship.

== Research ==
Sergey's work in molecular imprinting focuses on: (i) the fundamental study of the recognition properties of molecularly imprinted polymers; (ii) the development of sensors and assays for environmental and clinical analysis; and (iii) the development of molecularly imprinted polymer nanoparticles for theranostic applications.

Sergey introduced computational design into the field of molecular imprinting, by scientifically demonstrating that non-covalent interaction between the template molecule and polymer is through the technique known as 'bite and switch' wherein functional groups first non-covalently bond with the binding site, but during the rebinding step, the polymer matrix forms irreversible covalent bonds with the target molecule. A number of research groups around the world follow his ideas in developing functional imprinted polymers for a variety of applications.

== Notable publications ==
- Turner, Nicholas W.; Subrahmanyam, Sreenath; Piletsky, Sergey A. (2009-01-26). "Analytical methods for determination of mycotoxins: A review". Analytica Chimica Acta. 632 (2): 168–180. Bibcode:2009AcAC..632..168T. doi:10.1016/j.aca.2008.11.010. ISSN 0003-2670. PMID 19110091.
- Whitcombe, Michael J.; Chianella, Iva; Larcombe, Lee; Piletsky, Sergey A.; Noble, James; Porter, Robert; Horgan, Adrian (2011-02-22). "The rational development of molecularly imprinted polymer-based sensors for protein detection". Chemical Society Reviews. 40 (3): 1547–1571. doi:10.1039/C0CS00049C. hdl:1826/6232. ISSN 1460-4744. PMID 21132204.
- Bossi, A.; Bonini, F.; Turner, A. P. F.; Piletsky, S. A. (2007-01-15). "Molecularly imprinted polymers for the recognition of proteins: The state of the art". Biosensors and Bioelectronics. 22 (6): 1131–1137. doi:10.1016/j.bios.2006.06.023. ISSN 0956-5663. PMID 16891110.
- Surface-grafted molecularly imprinted polymers for protein recognition, A Bossi, SA Piletsky, EV Piletska, PG Righetti, APF Turner, Analytical chemistry 73 (21), 5281-5286
- Electrochemical sensor for catechol and dopamine based on a catalytic molecularly imprinted polymer-conducting polymer hybrid recognition element, Dhana Lakshmi, Alessandra Bossi, Michael J Whitcombe, Iva Chianella, Steven A Fowler, Sreenath Subrahmanyam, Elena V Piletska, Sergey A Piletsky, Analytical Chemistry 81 (9), 3576-3584
- Subrahmanyam, Sreenath; Karim, Kal; Piletsky, Sergey A. (2012), "Computational Approaches in the Design of Synthetic Receptors", in Piletsky, Sergey A.; Whitcombe, Michael J. (eds.), Designing Receptors for the Next Generation of Biosensors, vol. 12, Berlin, Heidelberg: Springer Berlin Heidelberg, pp. 131–165, doi:10.1007/5346_2012_22, ISBN 978-3-642-32328-7
- Subrahmanyam, Sreenath; Piletsky, Sergey A. (2009), "Computational Design of Molecularly Imprinted Polymers", Combinatorial Methods for Chemical and Biological Sensors, New York, NY: Springer New York, pp. 135–172, Bibcode:2009cmcb.book..135S, doi:10.1007/978-0-387-73713-3_6, ISBN 978-0-387-73712-6
- Poma, Alessandro; Whitcombe, Michael; Piletsky, Sergey (2012), "Plastic Antibodies", Springer Series on Chemical Sensors and Biosensors, Berlin, Heidelberg: Springer Berlin Heidelberg, pp. 105–129, doi:10.1007/5346_2012_24, ISBN 978-3-642-32328-7
- Rouillon, Régis; Piletsky, Sergey A.; Breton, Florent; Piletska, Elena V.; Carpentier, Robert (2006), "Photosystem II Biosensors for Heavy Metals Monitoring", in Giardi, Maria Teresa; Piletska, Elena V. (eds.), Biotechnological Applications of Photosynthetic Proteins: Biochips, Biosensors and Biodevices, Biotechnology Intelligence Unit, Boston, MA: Springer US, pp. 166–174, doi:10.1007/978-0-387-36672-2_15, ISBN 978-0-387-36672-2
- Piletsky S.A., Turner A.P.F. (2006). New generation of chemical sensors based on molecularly imprinted polymers, in: Molecular imprinting of polymers, S. Piletsky and A.P.F. Turner (eds.), Landes Bioscience, Georgetown, TX, USA

== Notable patents ==
- Rationally Designed Selective Binding Polymers (2010), Publication number: 20100009859, Inventors: Sergey A. Piletsky, Olena Piletska, Khalku Karim, Coulton H. Legge, Sreenath Subrahmanyam
- Electrochemical Sensor (2019) Publication number: 20210239643, Inventors: Sergey Piletsky, Omar Sheej Ahamad, Alvaro Garcia Cruz
- Polymerisation method, polymers and uses thereof (2006) Publication number: 20060122288, Inventors: Sergey Piletsky, Olena Piletska, Anthony Turner, Khalku Karim, Beining Chen
- Methods and Kits for determining binding sites (2020) Publication number: 20200033356, Inventors: Sergey Piletsky, Elena Piletska, Francesco Canfarotta, Don Jones
- Photoreactor and Process for Preparing MIP Nanoparticles (2014) Publication number: 20140228472, Inventors: Sergey Piletsky, Olena Piletska, Antonio Guerreiro, Michael Whitcombe, Alessandro Poma
