= Ian A. Nicholls =

Australian-Swedish chemist and educator

Ian Alan Nicholls (born 24 October 1962 in Melbourne, Australia) is an educator and researcher in the fields of chemistry and chemical engineering and an academic leader. Since 2013 he has held the position of Dean of the Faculty of Health and Life Sciences at Linnaeus University, Sweden, and is a Deputy Vice Chancellor of the university.

== Education ==
After graduating from Penleigh and Essendon Grammar School (1980) he studied at the University of Melbourne (BSc(hons) and PhD in medicinal chemistry, 1981-1989). In 1998 he was awarded the title docent (habilitation/associate professor) by the Faculty of Engineering, Lund University, Sweden.

== Career ==
A year (1989) as lecturer at Victoria University of Technology (then Western Institute) was followed by a move in 1989 to Cambridge University (UK) for a position as post-doctoral research fellow with Prof. Dudley H. Williams FRS, then in 1992 to Lund University (Sweden) with Prof. Klaus Mosbach. Over the years 1994 to 1999 he held a series of positions at Lund University and the University of Kalmar (from 2010 Linnaeus University) before being appointed as full professor of bioorganic chemistry in 2000. From 2007 until 2012 he was Head (prefekt) of the School of Natural Sciences, and as of 2013 Dean and Deputy Vice Chancellor. Since 2010 Nicholls has held a visiting professorship at Uppsala University (Sweden) and in 2014 he was appointed adjunct professor in Materials Science and Engineering at Jiangsu University (PRC).

== Research ==
Nicholls' research is primarily focused on the development of biomimetic materials and their application in sensing, catalysis and as biomaterials/therapeutics, and on fundamental studies of molecular recognition phenomena. This is reflected in his work with molecular imprinting and concerning the anticoagulant warfarin. He has a number of editorial responsibilities, including editor-in-chief for International Journal of Molecular Sciences.
