= Teleborg Castle =

Coordinates: 56°51′24″N 14°50′05″E

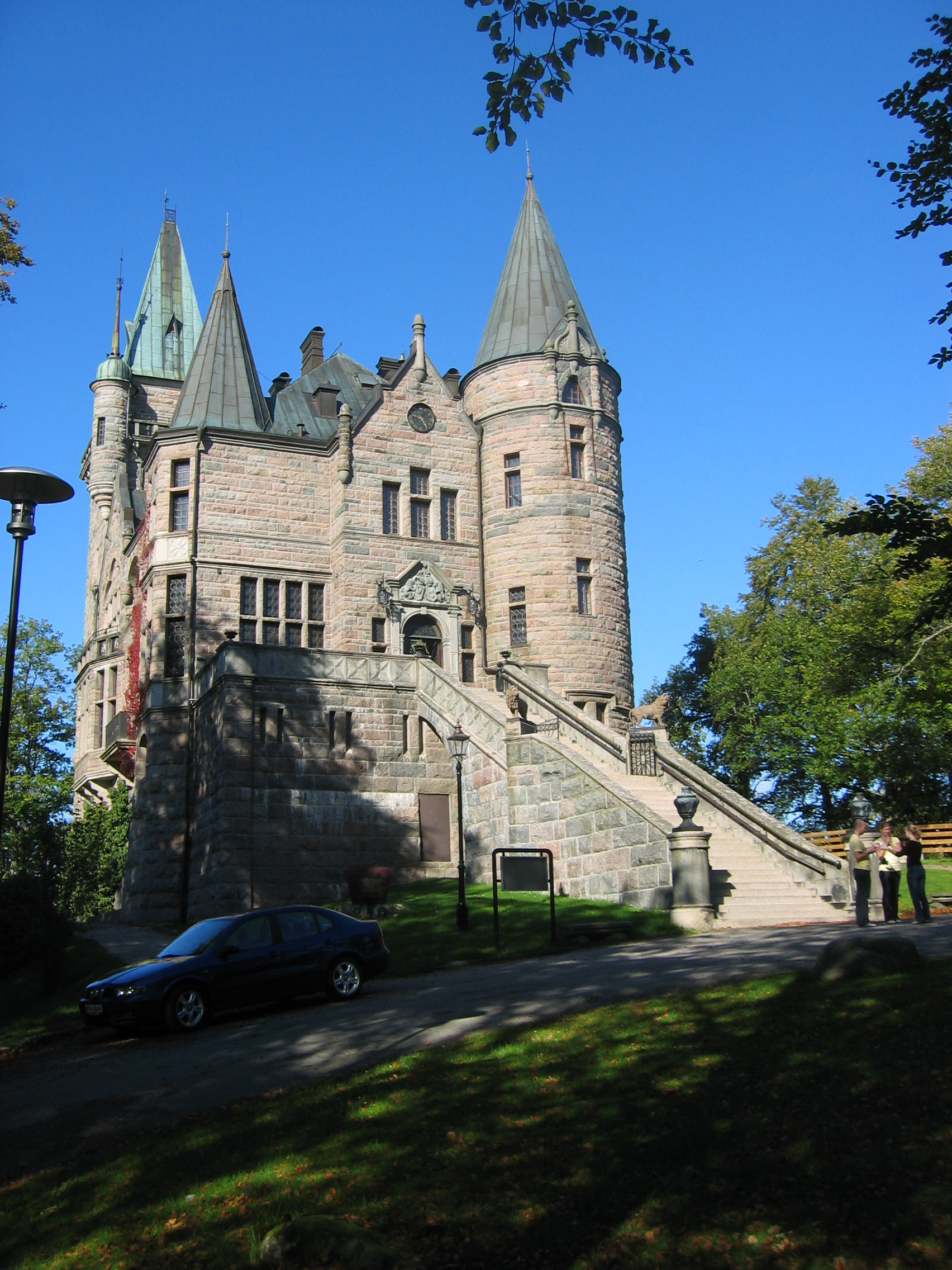
Teleborg Castle

Teleborg Castle (Teleborgs slott) is situated in the northern Linnaeus University area, near Lake Trummen, 4–5 km south of the city centre of Växjö, Sweden.

Despite its medieval style, the castle was built in 1900 by architect firm Lindvall & Boklund. The castle was built as a wedding present from count Fredrik Bonde af Björnö to his wife Anna Koskull. 17 years later, the couple had died, and the castle was used as a girls' school and rental accommodation. In 1964 the city of Växjö bought it and the surrounding park from the Bonde family, and today it is used mainly as an entertaining, wedding and conference venue. The nearby university also uses some parts of the castle.

== Gallery Teleborg Castle, Växjö ==
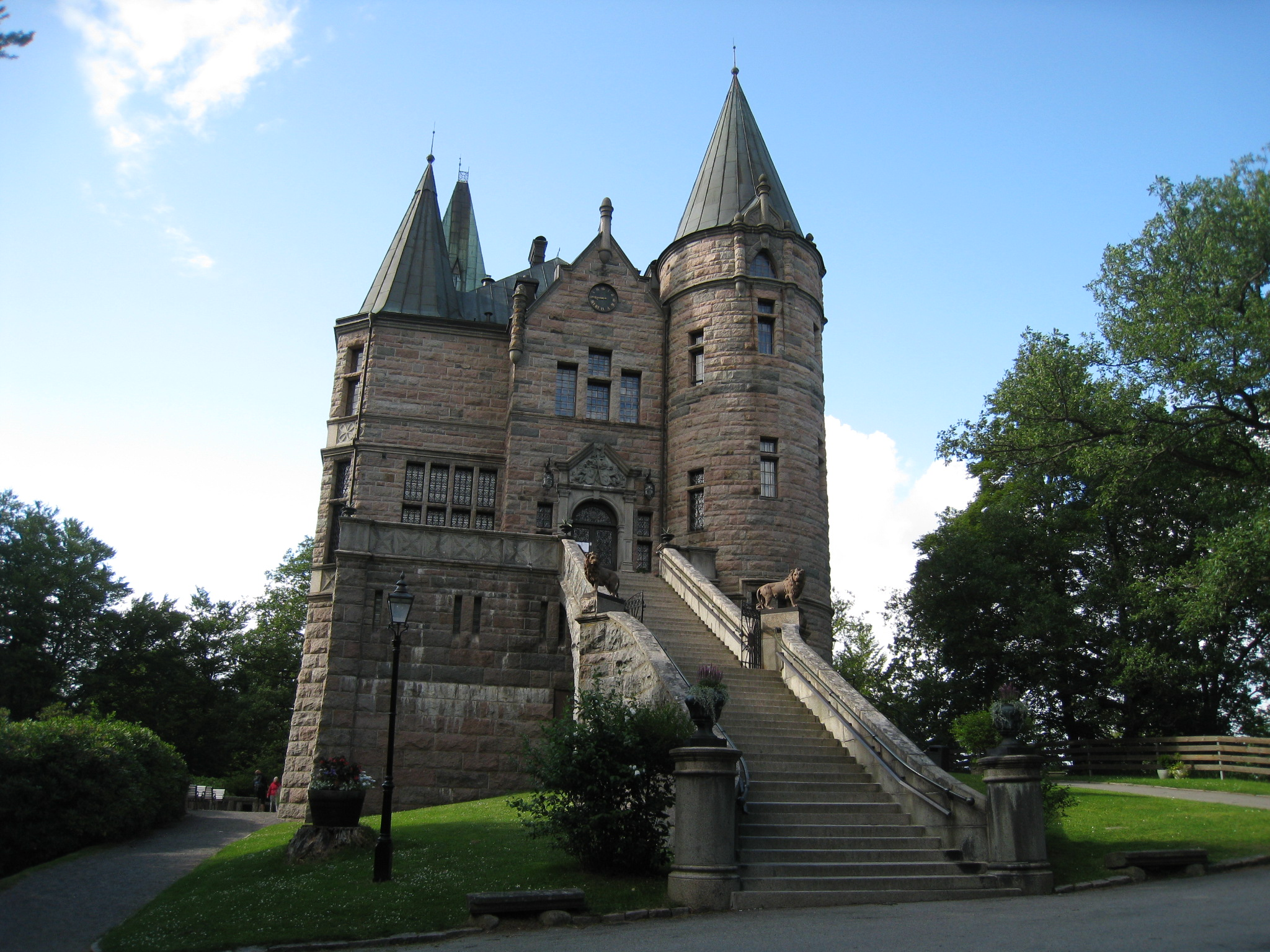

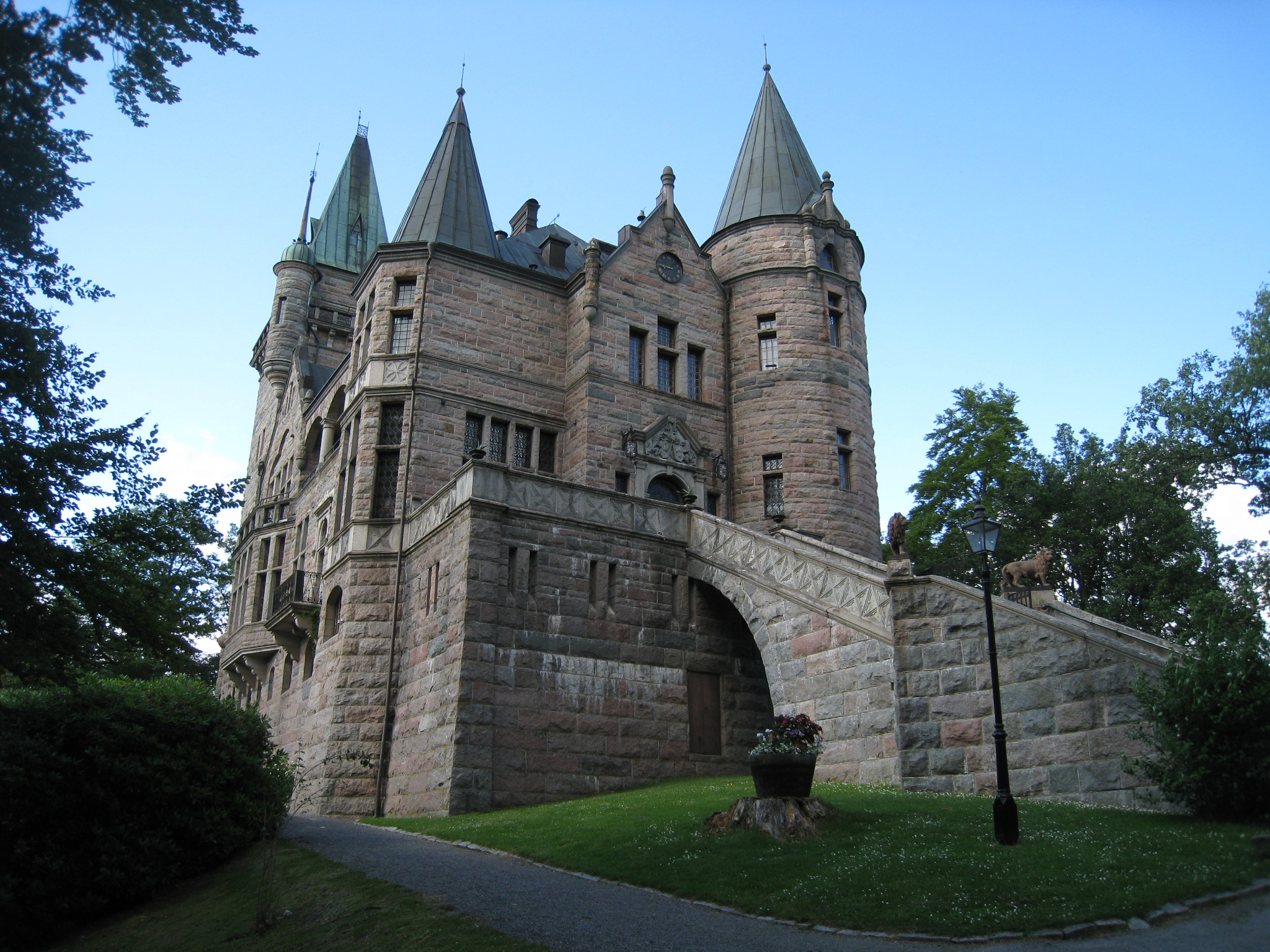

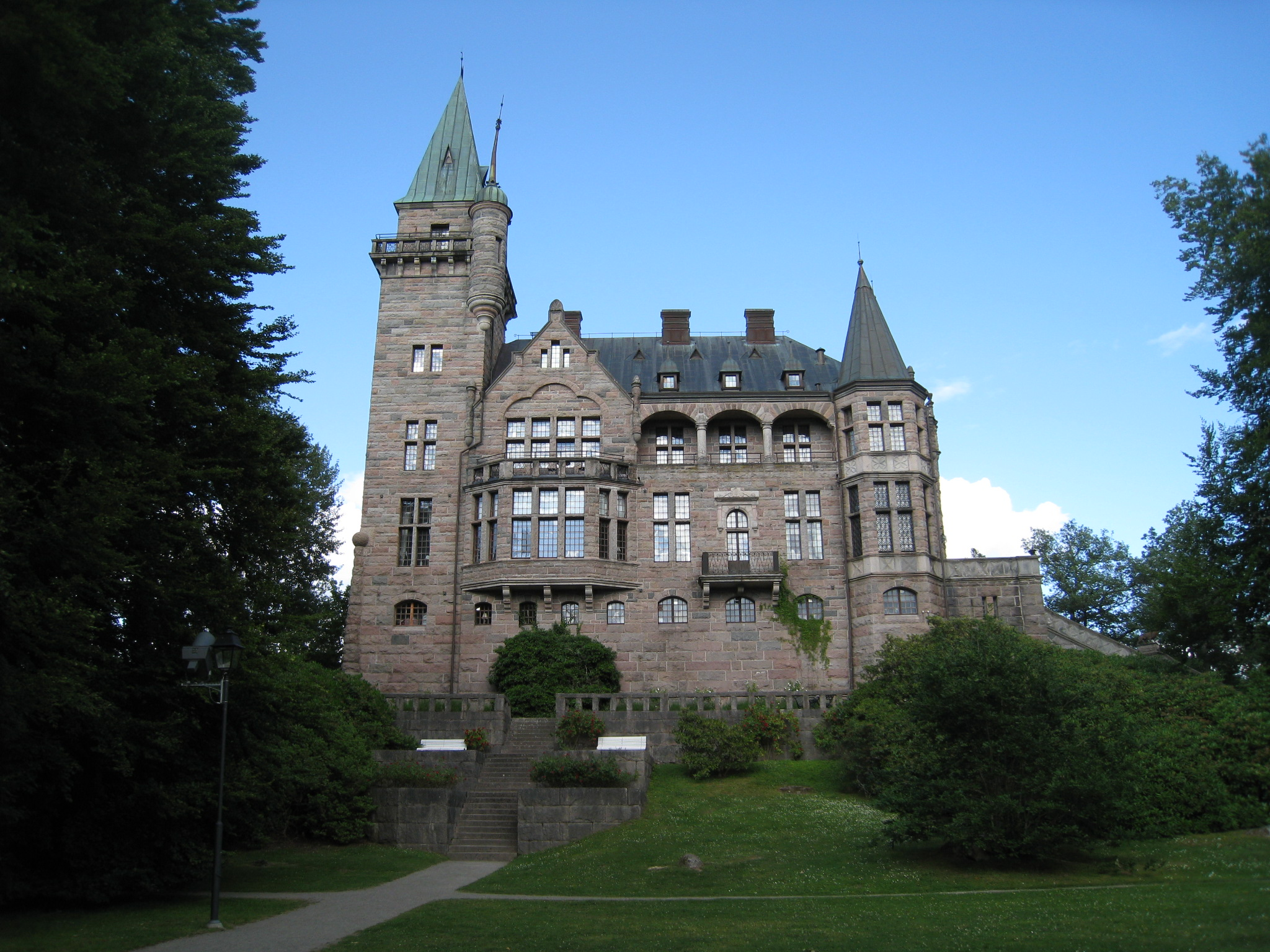

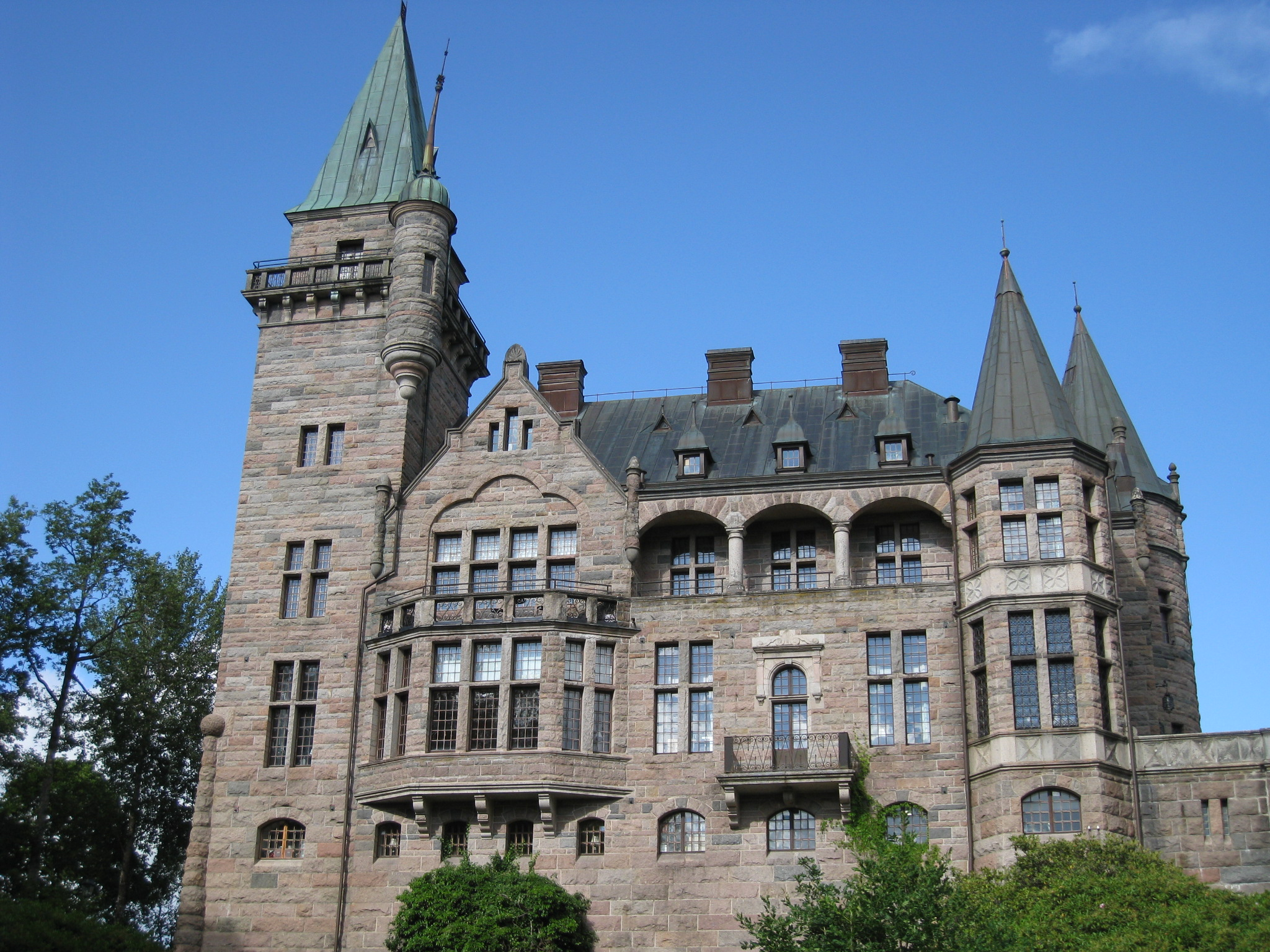

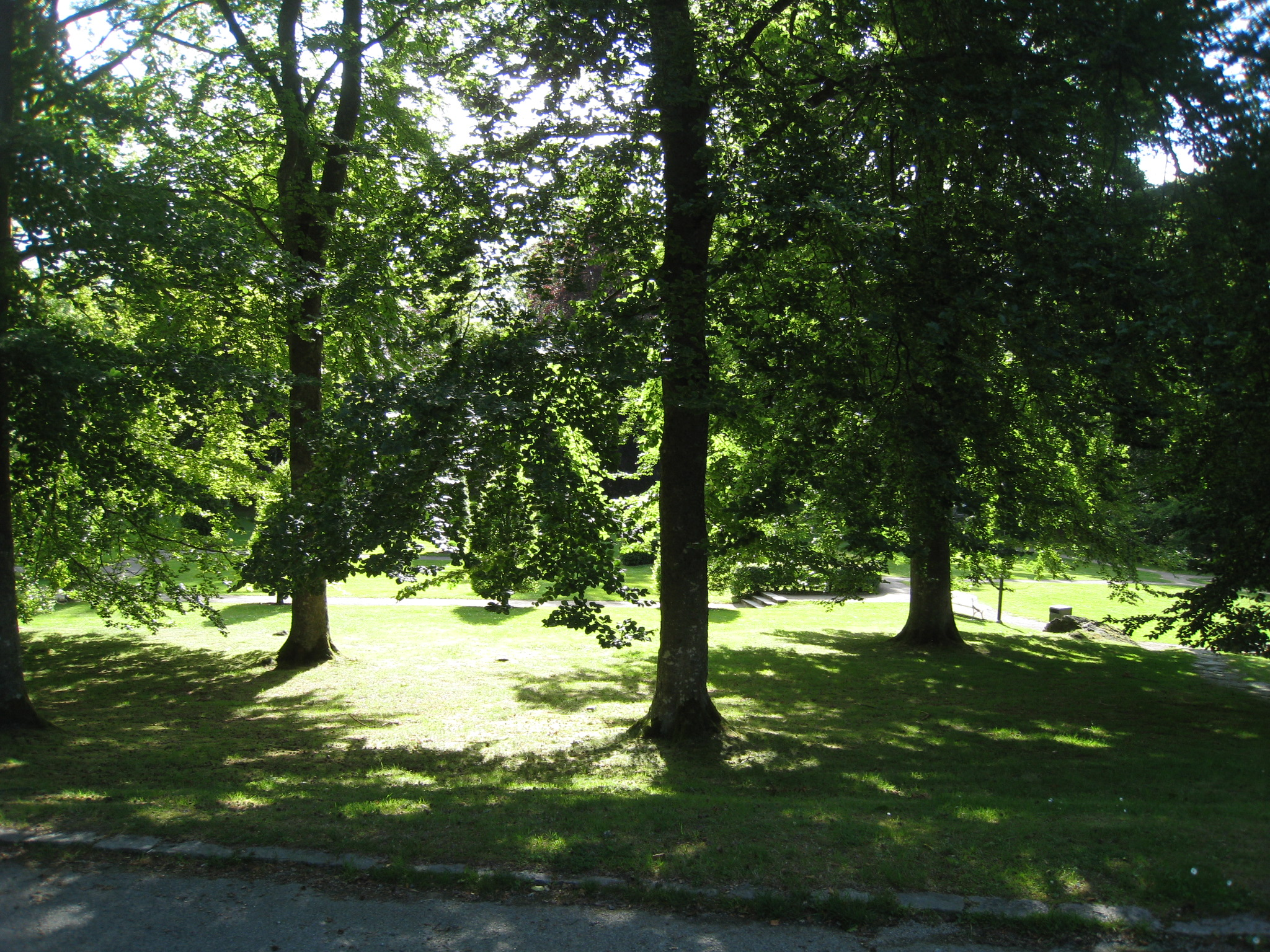
