= Andriy Tsaplienko =

Ukrainian journalist and war reporter

- Андрій Юрійович Цаплієнко
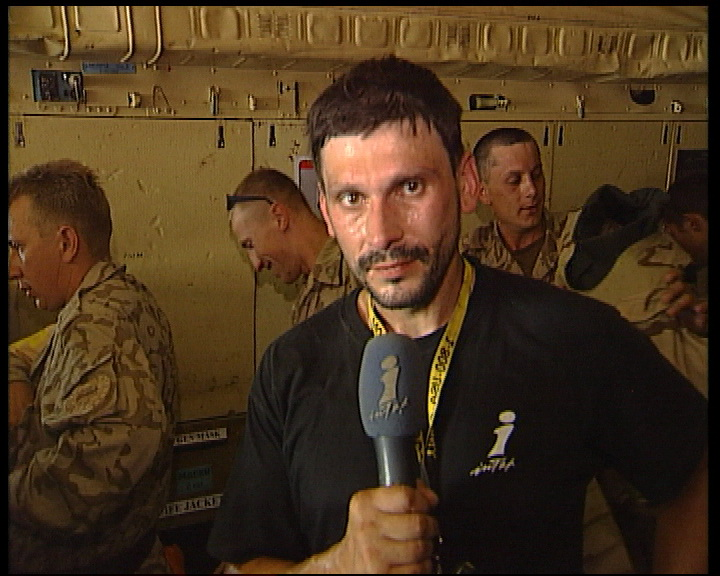
- Andriy Tsaplienko reports from Baghdad
- Born: October 12, 1968 (age 57); Kharkiv, Ukrainian SSR, Soviet Union
- Education: Kharkiv National Kotlyarevsky University of Arts, Linnaeus University, Kyiv International University
- Occupation: Journalist
- Employer: 1+1, Ukraine Today
- Awards: Laureate of Ivan Franko State Award (2004); Laureate of Albert Londres Prize (2022); Medal "20 years of troops' withdrawal from Afghanistan"

Andriy Yuriyovych Tsaplienko (born 12 October 1968; Ukrainian: Андрій Юрійович Цаплієнко) is a Ukrainian journalist, presenter, filmmaker and writer.

== Biography ==
Born in Kharkiv, Ukraine. Married, has two sons and a daughter.

== Education ==
- 1985–1991 Kharkiv National Kotlyarevsky University of Arts
- 1995 Kalmar University, Sweden (FOJO, The Institute for Further Education of Journalists)
- 2003–2006 Kyiv International University

== Career ==
Tsaplienko was the first, and sometimes only, Ukrainian journalist in many conflicts and hot spots. He has reported extensively and authoritatively on many of world's major news stories in recent years. He started his career in television in 1989 as a lighting specialist in his hometown television channel. Following this, he worked as a regional reporter for TV channel Orion.

In 1997 he moved to Kyiv and the following year he joined TV channel Inter. Since 1999 he has released several weekly projects N-kilometer, In the firing line, Special correspondent.

In 2001 he filed exclusive reports for TV channel Inter from Afghanistan covering stories on different sides of the conflict including Taliban fighters and Northern Alliance factions. As a war correspondent he covered many conflicts including wars in Macedonia, Iraq, Côte d'Ivoire, Nepal, Sri Lanka, South Ossetia, Kashmir, Liberia, Burundi, Colombia.

Since 2007 Tsaplienko has released several documentaries for Inter as a scriptwriter: Organs for export, Euroslaves, Dr. Heim. Human experimentation, A true story of Major Whirlwind, Dope. Champions' factory, among others.

In 2010 Tsaplienko published his novel Equator. Black & White. Victor Bout, a Russian national who was sentenced to 25 years in prison in April 2012 after being found guilty of conspiracy to kill US officials and delivering anti-aircraft missiles to a terrorist organisation, is believed to be the prototype of the protagonist of the novel.

In 2012 Tsaplienko's film Betrayed city was nominated to Taras Shevchenko National Award.

On 7 March 2014, during the Russian-Ukrainian conflict in Crimea, Tsaplienko was captured and tortured by armed pro-Russian activists after filming the siege and assault of a Ukrainian military base by Russian troops in Sevastopol. Tsaplienko was pursued allegedly by separatists' riot police officers who used their weapons during the pursuit. The next day, a list of injured journalists was mentioned in the statement of M-me Dunja Mijatović, the OSCE Representative on Freedom of the Media: "A number of journalists have been threatened, assaulted, physically attacked and several members of the media have been severely injured while covering the events in Crimea. They include Argumenti nedeli-Krym (Stanislav Yurchenko), Associated Press Television News, BBC, CNN, Inter channel (Olena Mekhanik, Andriy Tsaplienko and two operators), Russkaya Planeta (Pavel Nikulin), STB (Oleksii Simakov, Oleksandr Albinskyi, Vyacheslav Skvorchevskyi, Igor Levenok), 5 channel (Anton Laktionov) and a number of freelancers, including Boryana Katsarova and Dimiter Kenarov. Journalists have also had their equipment confiscated by unidentified assailants."

This attack was depicted in the novel Crimea is ours.

Since August 24, 2014, Tsaplienko works for the Ukrainian channels 1+1 and Ukraine Today covering the events in the Donbass War and also takes part in volunteer activities supporting Ukrainian soldiers. In September 2014 he published his second novel "The Empire of the four sides".

In 2018, Tsaplienko published his dystopian novel The Wall.

In the evening of March 25, 2022 Tsaplienko was wounded during a shelling by Russian troops on a column of civilians in the Chernihiv region.

"It happened during the shelling of the humanitarian corridor to Chernihiv. There were many civilians and cars waiting for permission to cross into Chernihiv to pick up their relatives. After the drone recorded a crowd, 15 minutes later the shelling began. First they started firing from Smerch (heavy multiple rocket launcher), then from 122 mm caliber artillery, then a mortar was connected, and at the final stage it was a tank. All this lasted at least an hour and a half," Andriy Tsaplienko said.

== Awards ==
1. Order for Courage 2nd class (August 23, 2022).
2. Order for Courage 3rd class (2001)
3. Medal "20 years of troops' withdrawal from Afghanistan" (2009)
4. I.Franko State Award (2004)
5. "Best screenplay" Award in XIII Bar International TV festival (Montenegro) for the film "Dope. Champions' factory" (2008)
6. "TV triumph" annual National Award (2006), nomination "Journalist, reporter"
7. "TV triumph" annual National Award (2003), nomination "Journalist, reporter"
8. "TV triumph" annual National Award (2002), nomination "Journalist, reporter"
9. "TV triumph" annual National Award (2001), nomination "Journalist, reporter".
10. "Man of the Year" annual National Award (2001), nomination "Journalist"
11. Prix Albert Londres (2022), Special Honorary Prize (together with Sevgil Musaieva)

== Books ==
- "Macedonia: The Conflict and The Media", 2003, Skopje, Macedonia, co-author, chapter "War and peace?".
- Novel "Equator. Black & White" "Folio Publishers", 2010, Kharkiv.
- "P.O.W. People of war", essays and stories, "Folio Publishers", 2011, Kharkiv
- "The Four Sides Empire", novel, "Folio Publishers", 2014, Kharkiv
- "The book of changes", essays and stories, "Bookclub Publishers", 2015, Kharkiv (translated to Lithuanian by "Briedis Publishers" as "Permainų knyga" in 2018)
- "The Wall", a dystopian novel, "Bright Books Publishers", 2018, Kyiv, "Old Lion Publishers", 2018, Lviv

== Publications ==
- "Leben in der heissen Zone", 1999, "Ost in West", Germany
- "Geliebte Holle", 1999, "Ost in West", Germany
- Novel "Triumph"
- Article "How to become an FSB spy"
- Article "The fate of front-line people"
- Article "Independence duty-free"
- Article "Russian Britons"
- Article "Frygt og had i Avdijivka", 2017, "Weekendavisen", Denmark
- Article "Ved verdens laveste hav lever ukrainerne i skyggen af Ruslands aggression", 2018, "Kristeligt Dagblat", Denmark
