= Molecularly imprinted polymer =

Polymer with synthetic molecular receptor

A molecularly imprinted polymer (MIP) is a polymer that has been processed using the molecular imprinting technique which leaves cavities in the polymer matrix with an affinity for a chosen "template" molecule. The process usually involves initiating the polymerization of monomers in the presence of a template molecule that is extracted afterwards, leaving behind complementary cavities. These polymers have affinity for the original molecule and have been used in applications such as chemical separations, catalysis, or molecular sensors. Published works on the topic date to the 1930s.

== Molecular imprinting techniques (state of the art and perspectives) ==
Molecular imprinting is the process of generating an impression within a solid or a gel, the size, shape and charge distribution of which corresponds to a template molecule typically present during polymerisation. The result is a synthetic receptor capable of binding to a target molecule, which fits into the binding site with high affinity and specificity. The interactions between the polymer and the template are similar to those between antibodies and antigens, consisting of electrostatic interactions, hydrogen bonds, Van der Waals forces, and hydrophobic interactions.

One of the greatest advantages of artificial receptors over naturally occurring receptors is freedom of molecular design. Their frameworks are not restricted to proteins, and a variety of skeletons (e.g., carbon chains and fused aromatic rings) can be used. Thus, the stability, flexibility, and other properties are freely modulated according to need. Even functional groups that are not found in nature can be employed in these synthetic compounds. Furthermore, when necessary, the activity in response towards outer stimuli (photo-irradiation, pH change, electric or magnetic field, and others) can be provided by using appropriate functional groups.

In a molecular imprinting processes, one needs a 1) template, 2) functional monomer(s) 3) cross-linker, 4) radical or other polymerization initiator, 5) porogenic solvent and 6) extraction solvent. According to polymerization method and final polymer format one or some of the reagent can be avoided.

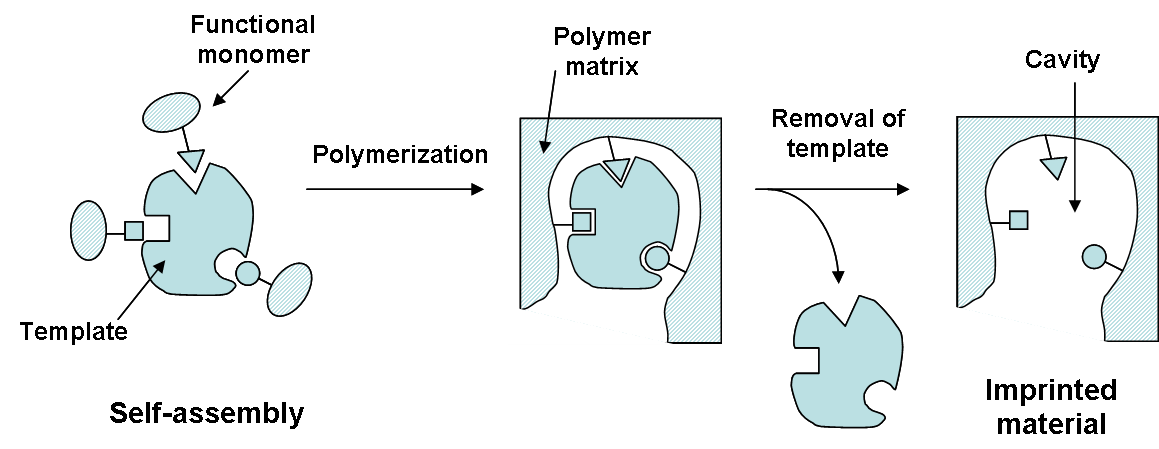
Preparation of molecularly imprinted material

=== Creating polymers ===
There are two main methods for creating these specialized polymers. The first is known as self-assembly, which involves the formation of polymer by combining all elements of the MIP and allowing the molecular interactions to form the cross-linked polymer with the template molecule bound. The second method of formation of MIPs involves covalently linking the imprint molecule to the monomer. After polymerization, the monomer is cleaved from the template molecule.[2] The selectivity is greatly influenced by the kind and amount of cross-linking agent used in the synthesis of the imprinted polymer. The selectivity is also determined by the covalent and non-covalent interactions between the target molecule and monomer functional groups. The careful choice of functional monomer is another important choice to provide complementary interactions with the template and substrates.[3] In an imprinted polymer, the cross-linker fulfills three major functions: First of all, the cross-linker is important in controlling the morphology of the polymer matrix, whether it is gel-type, macroporous or a microgel powder. Secondly, it serves to stabilize the imprinted binding site. Finally, it imparts mechanical stability to the polymer matrix. From a polymerization point of view, high cross-link ratios are generally preferred in order to access permanently porous materials and in order to be able to generate materials with adequate mechanical stability.

The self-assembly method has advantages in the fact that it forms a more natural binding site, and also offers additional flexibility in the types of monomers that can be polymerized. The covalent method has its advantages in generally offering a high yield of homogeneous binding sites, but first requires the synthesis of a derivatized imprint molecule and may not imitate the "natural" conditions that could be present elsewhere. Over the recent years, interest in the technique of molecular imprinting has increased rapidly, both in the academic community and in the industry. Consequently, significant progress has been made in developing polymerization methods that produce adequate MIP formats with rather good binding properties expecting an enhancement in the performance or in order to suit the desirable final application, such as beads, films or nanoparticles.

=== Challenges ===
One of the key issues that have limited the performance of MIPs in practical applications so far is the lack of simple and robust methods to synthesize MIPs in the optimum formats required by the application. Chronologically, the first polymerization method encountered for MIP was based on "bulk" or solution polymerization. This method is the most common technique used by groups working on imprinting especially due to its simplicity and versatility. It is used exclusively with organic solvents mainly with low dielectric constant and consists basically of mixing all the components (template, monomer, solvent and initiator) and subsequently polymerizing them. The resultant polymeric block is then pulverized, freed from the template, crushed and sieved to obtain particles of irregular shape and size between 20 and 50 μm.

Depending on the target (template) type and the final application of the MIP, MIPs are appeared in different formats such as nano/micro spherical particles, nanowires and thin film or membranes. They are produced with different polymerization techniques like bulk, precipitation, emulsion, suspension, dispersion, gelation, and multi-step swelling polymerization. Most of investigators in the field of MIP are making MIP with heuristic techniques such as hierarchical imprinting method. The technique for the first time was used for making MIP by Sellergren et al. for imprinting small target molecules. With the same concept, Nematollahzadeh et al. developed a general technique, so-called polymerization packed bed, to obtain hierarchically-structured, high capacity protein imprinted porous polymer beads by using silica porous particles for protein recognition and capture.

== Solid-phase synthesis ==
Solid-phase molecular imprinting has been recently developed as an alternative to traditional bulk imprinting, generating water-soluble nanoparticles. As the name implies, this technique requires the immobilisation of the target molecule on a solid support prior to performing polymerisation. This is analogous to solid-phase synthesis of peptides. The solid phase doubles as an affinity separation matrix, allowing the removal of low-affinity MIPs and overcoming many of the previously described limitations of MIPs:

- Separation of MIPs from the immobilised template molecule is greatly simplified.
- Binding sites are more uniform, and template molecules cannot become trapped within the polymer matrix.
- MIPs can be functionalised post-synthesis (whilst attached to the solid phase) without significantly influencing binding sites.
- The immobilised template can be reused, reducing the cost of MIP synthesis.

MIP nanoparticles synthesised via this approach have found applications in various diagnostic assay and sensors.

An adaptation of the solid-phase protocol was performed by Sullivan et al. who used a modified aptamer as a recognition macromonomer, encapsulated within a polymer nanoparticle scaffold. Producing the first truly aptamer-MIP hybrid (aptaMIP), improving target recognition.

== Molecular modelling ==
Molecular modelling has become a convenient choice in MIP design and analysis, allowing rapid selection of monomers and optimization of polymer composition, with a range of different techniques being applied. This application of molecular modelling utilises a method of automated screening of a large database of monomers against a given target or template with a molecular mechanics approach. In recent years technological advances have permitted more efficient analysis of monomer-template interactions by quantum mechanical molecular modelling, providing more precise calculations of binding energies. Molecular dynamics has also been applied for more detailed analysis of systems before polymerisation, and of the resulting polymer, which by including more system components (initiator, cross-linkers, solvents) provides greater accuracy in predicting successful MIP synthesis than monomer-template interactions alone. Molecular modelling, particular molecular dynamics and the less common coarse-grained techniques, can often also be integrated into greater theoretical models permitting thermodynamic analysis and kinetic data for mesoscopic analysis of imprinted polymer bulk monoliths and MIP nanoparticles.

== Applications ==
Niche areas for application of MIPs are in sensors and separation. Despite the current good health of molecular imprinting in general, one difficulty which appears to remain to this day is the commercialization of molecularly imprinted polymers. Despite this, many patents (1035 patents, up to October 2018, according to the Scifinder data base) on molecular imprinting were held by different groups.

Fast and cost-effective molecularly imprinted polymer technique has applications in many fields of chemistry, biology and engineering, particularly as an affinity material for sensors, detection of chemical, antimicrobial, and dye, residues in food, adsorbents for solid phase extraction, binding assays, artificial antibodies, chromatographic stationary phase, catalysis, drug development and screening, and byproduct removal in chemical reaction. Molecular imprinted polymers pose this range of capabilities in extraction through specific micro-cavity binding sites. Due to the specific binding site created in a MIP, this technique is showing promise in analytical chemistry as a method for solid phase extraction. The capability for MIPs to be a cheaper easier production of antibody/enzyme-like binding sites doubles the use of this technique as a breakthrough in medical research and application. Such possible medical applications include controlled release drugs, drug monitoring devices, and biological receptor mimetics. Additionally, MIPs can act as enzyme inhibitors by selectively binding to an enzyme's active site or key allosteric region, blocking substrate access and effectively reducing the enzyme's catalytic activity. Beyond this, MIPs show a promising future in the developing knowledge and application in food sciences.

The binding activity of MIPs can be lower compared than that of specific antibodies, even though examples have been reported of MIPs with comparable or better performance to commercially produced antibodies. This yields a wide variety of applications for MIPs from efficient extraction to pharmaceutical/medical uses. MIPs offer many advantages over protein binding sites. Proteins are difficult and expensive to purify, denature (pH, heat, proteolysis), and are difficult to immobilize for reuse. Synthetic polymers are cheap, easy to synthesize, and allow for elaborate, synthetic side chains to be incorporated. Unique side chains allow for higher affinity, selectivity, and specificity.

Molecularly imprinted assays Molecularly imprinted polymers arguably demonstrate their greatest potential as alternative affinity reagents for use in diagnostic applications, due to their comparable (and in some regards superior) performance to antibodies. Many studies have therefore focused on the development of molecularly imprinted assays (MIAs) since the seminal work by Vlatakis et al. in 1993, where the term "molecularly imprinted [sorbent] assay" was first introduced. Initial work on ligand binding assays utilising MIPs in place of antibodies consisted of radio-labelled MIAs, however the field has now evolved to include numerous assay formats such as fluorescence MIAs, enzyme-linked MIAs, and molecularly imprinted nanoparticle assay (MINA).

Molecularly imprinted polymers have also been used to enrich low abundant phosphopeptides from a cell lysate, outperforming titanium dioxide (TiO_{2}) enrichment- a gold standard to enrich phosphopeptides. Recent reviews have also summarized domain-specific developments in MIP applications, including bone biomarker detection and therapeutic modulation, antiviral strategies employing virus-targeted imprinting for multifunctional interventions, and neurological applications ranging from diagnostics to therapeutic delivery.

== History ==
In a paper published in 1931, Polyakov reported the effects of presence of different solvents (benzene, toluene and xylene) on the silica pore structure during drying a newly prepared silica. When sulfuric acid was used as the polymerization initiator as an acidifying agent, a positive correlation was found between surface areas, e.g. load capacities, and the molecular weights of the respective solvents. Later on, in 1949 Dickey reported the polymerization of sodium silicate in the presence of four different dyes (namely methyl, ethyl, n-propyl, and n-butyl orange). The dyes were subsequently removed, and in rebinding experiments it was found that silica prepared in the presence of any of these "pattern molecules" would bind the pattern molecule in preference to the other three dyes. Shortly after this work had appeared, several research groups pursued the preparation of specific adsorbents using Dickey's method. Some commercial interest was also shown by the fact that Merck patented a nicotine filter, consisting of nicotine imprinted silica, able to adsorb 10.7% more nicotine than non-imprinted silica. The material was intended for use in cigarettes, cigars and pipes filters. Shortly after this work appeared, molecular imprinting attracted wide interest from the scientific community. Although interest in the technique is relatively new, the molecularly imprinted technique has commonly been shown to be effective when targeting small molecules of molecular weight <1000.

== Production limitations ==
Production of novel MIPs has implicit challenges unique to this field. These challenges arise chiefly from the fact that all substrates are different and thus require different monomer and cross-linker combinations to adequately form imprinted polymers for that substrate. The first, and lesser, challenge arises from choosing those monomers which will yield adequate binding sites complementary to the functional groups of the substrate molecule. For example, it would be unwise to choose completely hydrophobic monomers to be imprinted with a highly hydrophilic substrate. These considerations need to be taken into account before any new MIP is created. Molecular modelling can be used to predict favourable interactions between templates and monomers, allowing intelligent monomer selection.

Secondly, and more troublesome, the yield of properly created MIPs is limited by the capacity to effectively wash the substrate from the MIP once the polymer has been formed around it. In creating new MIPs, a compromise must be created between full removal of the original template and damaging of the substrate binding cavity. Such damage is generally caused by strong removal methods and includes collapsing of the cavity, distorting the binding points, incomplete removal of the template and rupture of the cavity.

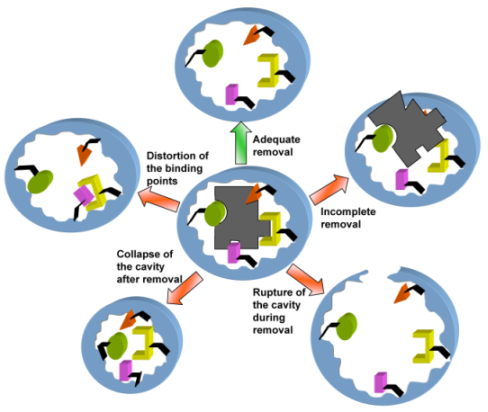
Challenges of Template Removal for Molecular Imprinted Polymers

== Template removal ==
Most of the developments in MIP production during the last decade have come in the form of new polymerization techniques in an attempt to control the arrangement of monomers and therefore the polymers structure. However, there have been very few advances in the efficient removal of the template from the MIP once it has been polymerized. Due to this neglect, the process of template removal is now the least cost efficient and most time-consuming process in MIP production. Furthermore, in order of MIPs to reach their full potential in analytical and biotechnological applications, an efficient removal process must be demonstrated.

There are several different methods of extraction which are currently being used for template removal. These have been grouped into 3 main categories: Solvent extraction, physically assisted extraction, and subcritical or supercritical solvent extraction.

=== Solvent extraction ===
- Soxhlet extraction This has been a standard extraction method with organic solvents since its creation over a century ago. This technique consists of placing the MIP particles into a cartridge inside the extraction chamber, and the extraction solvent in poured into a flask connected to the extractor chamber. The solvent is then heated and condenses inside the cartridge thereby contacting the MIP particles and extracting the template. The main advantages to this technique are the repeated washing of MIP particles with fresh extracting solvent, favors solubilization because it uses hot solvent, no filtration is required upon completion to collect the MIP particles, the equipment is affordable, and it is very versatile and can be applied to nearly any polymer matrix. The main disadvantages are the long extraction time, the large amount of organic solvent used, the possibility of degradation for temperature sensitive polymers, the static nature of the technique does not facilitate solvent flow through MIP, and the automation is difficult.
- Incubation This involves the immersion of the MIPs into solvents that can induce swelling of the polymer network and simultaneously favor the dissociation of the template from the polymer. Generally this method is carried out under mild conditions and the stability of the polymer is not affected. However, much like the Soxhlet extraction technique, this method also is very time-consuming.
- Solid-phase template As described above, one benefit of immobilising the template molecule on a solid support such as glass beads is the easy removal of the MIPs from the template. Following a cold wash to remove unreacted monomers and low-affinity polymers, hot solvent can be added to disrupt binding and allow the collection of high affinity MIPs.

=== Physically-assisted extraction ===
- Ultrasound-assisted extraction (UAE) This method uses Ultrasound which is a cyclic sound pressure with a frequency greater than 20 kHz. This method works through the process known as cavitation which forms small bubbles in liquids and the mechanical erosion of solid particles. This causes a local increase in temperature and pressure which favor solubility, diffusivity, penetration and transport of solvent and template molecules.
- Microwave-assisted extraction (MAE) This method uses microwaves which directly interact with the molecules causing Ionic conduction and dipole rotation. The use of microwaves for extraction make the extraction of the template occur rapidly, however, one must be careful to avoid excessively high temperatures if the polymers are heat sensitive. This has the best results when the technique is used in concert with strong organic acids, however, this poses another problem because it may cause partial MIP degradation as well. This method does have some benefits in that it significantly reduces the time required to extract the template, decreases the solvent costs, and is considered to be a clean technique.
- Mechanical method A study has shown that the microcontact molecular imprinting method allows mechanical removal of the target (large biomolecules, proteins etc.) from the template. This technology combined with biosensor applications is promising for biotechnological, environmental and medical applications.

=== Subcritical or supercritical solvent extraction ===
- Subcritical water (PHWE) This method employs the use of water, which is the cheapest and greenest solvent, under high temperatures (100–374 °C) and pressures (10–60 bar). This method is based upon the high reduction in polarity that liquid water undergoes when heated to high temperatures. This allows water to solubilize a wide variety of polar, ionic and non-polar compounds. The decreased surface tension and viscosity under these conditions also favor diffusivity. Furthermore, the high thermal energy helps break intermolecular forces such as dipole-dipole interactions, vander Waals forces, and hydrogen bonding between the template and the matrix.
- Supercritical CO_{2} (SFE)

== See also ==
- Artificial enzyme
