= Linnaeus University =

University in Sweden

- Linnéuniversitetet
- Latin: Universitas Linnæus
- Former names: Växjö Universitet (1999–2009); Högskolan i Växjö (1977–1999); Högskolan i Kalmar (1977–2009)
- Type: Public university
- Established: 2010; 16 years ago as university, 1970; 56 years ago as college, 1967; 59 years ago as Lund University
- Affiliations: EUA, SUHF
- Endowment: SEK 1.5 billion
- Budget: 1761 Mkr (2016)
- Rector: Peter Aronsson
- Faculty: 2000
- Students: 16,000 FTE
- Doctoral students: 302 (F167+M135)
- Location: Växjö & Kalmar, Småland, Sweden; 56°51′15″N 14°49′51″E
- Campus: Urban
- Website: lnu.se

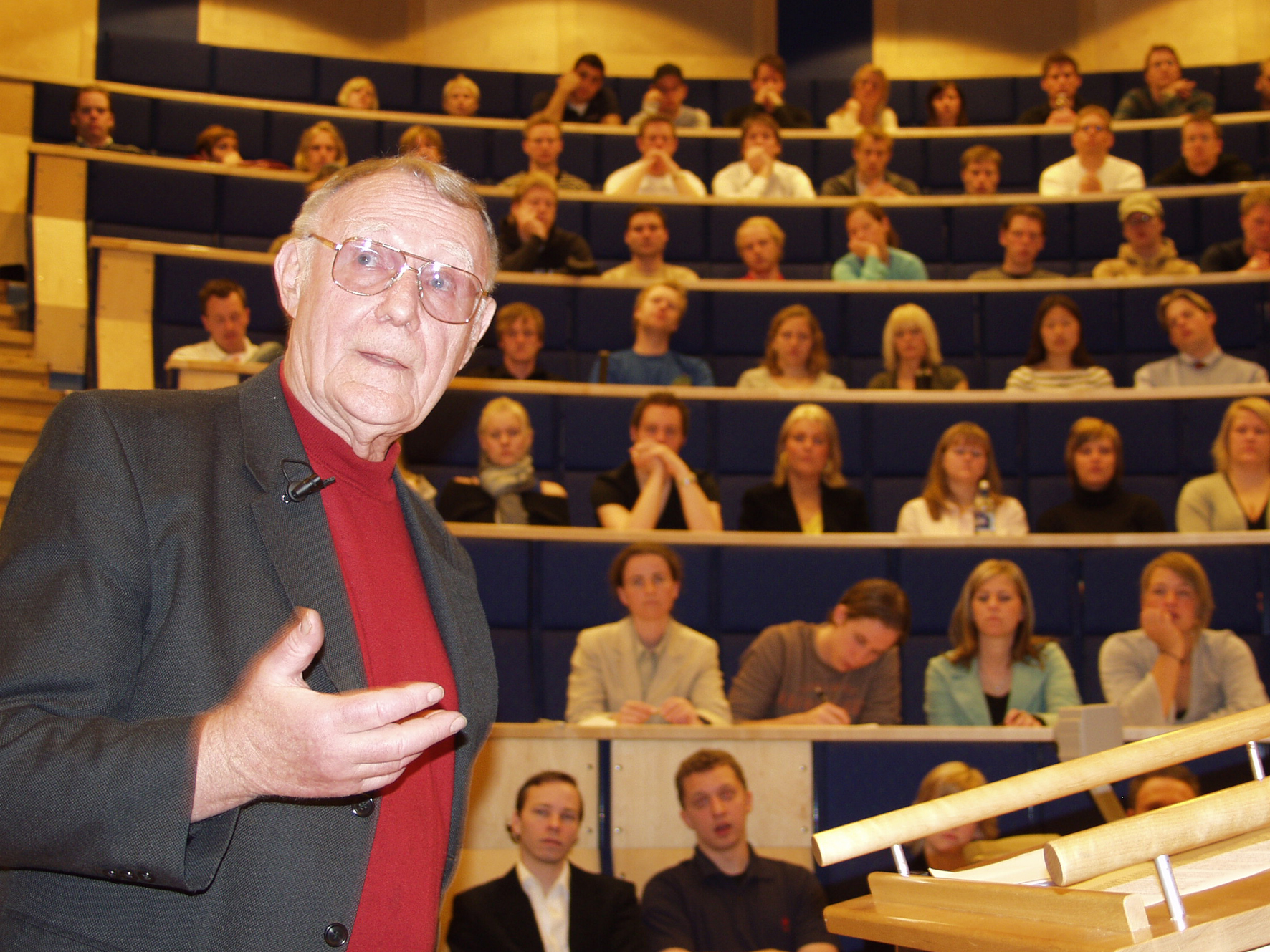
Ingvar Kamprad, founder of IKEA, holding a lecture for a group of students at Växjö University

Linnaeus University (LNU) (Swedish: Linnéuniversitetet) is a state university in the historical province (landskap) of Småland, Sweden, with campuses located in the cities of Växjö and Kalmar. Linnaeus University was established in 2010 by a merger of former Växjö University and Kalmar University (Högskolan i Kalmar), and is named in honour of the Swedish botanist Carl Linnaeus.

== History ==
Växjö University began as a local department of Lund University in 1967. The department became an independent university college in 1970 and was granted full university status in 1999.

Kalmar University was similarly a university college, founded in 1977. Though not a university by the Swedish definition, it had been entitled to issue doctoral degrees in the natural sciences since 1999.

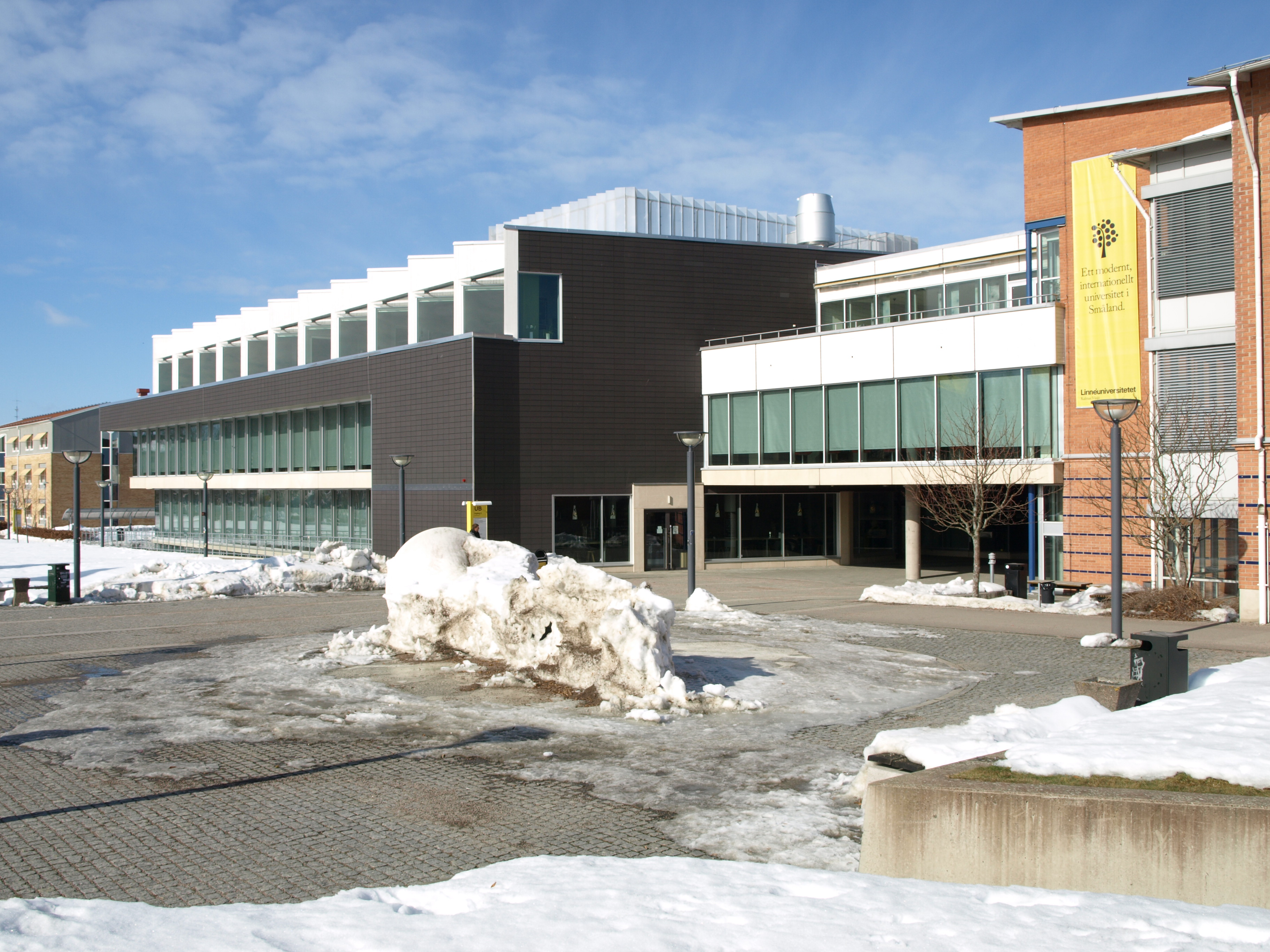
LNU's library in Växjö

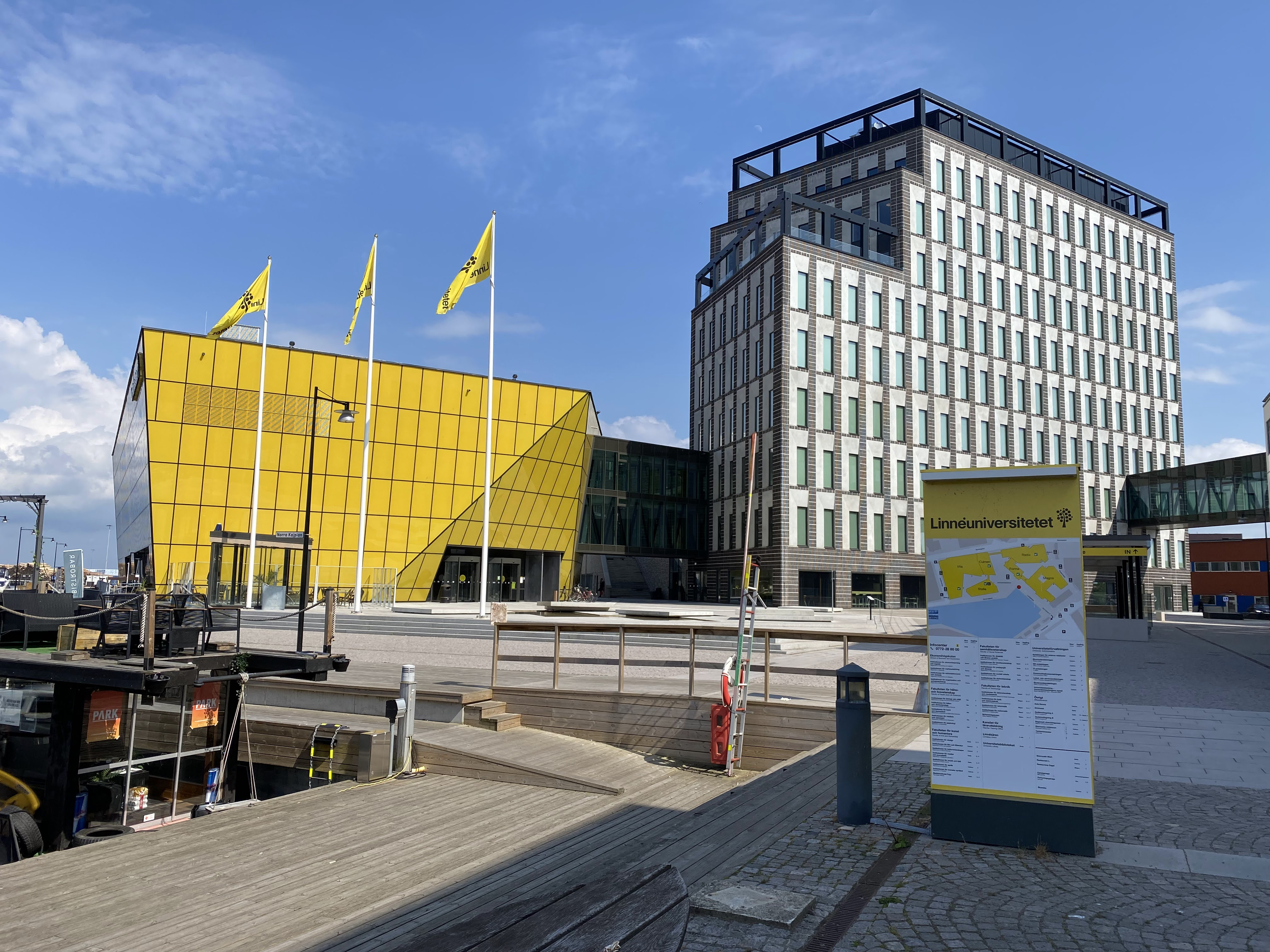
LNU's campus in Kalmar

== Name and logotype ==
The university is named after the Swedish scientist Carl Linnaeus. Born 1707 in the village of Råshult about 55 km southwest of Växjö, he attended the Växjö trivial school and gymnasium from 1716 to 1727. He was not happy in Växjö and left as soon as he could to pursue his academic studies in Lund and Uppsala. Linnaeus never returned for longer periods to Växjö, and only travelled through Kalmar on his Öland journey 1741.

The university's logo is a stylized tree. The origin is a drawing made by Linnaeus taken from his 1725 publication Örtabok. While the tree is said to be a symbol of May and to represent the power of growth, it also symbolizes the university's ambition to be a global university with the region as its base and the world as its arena.

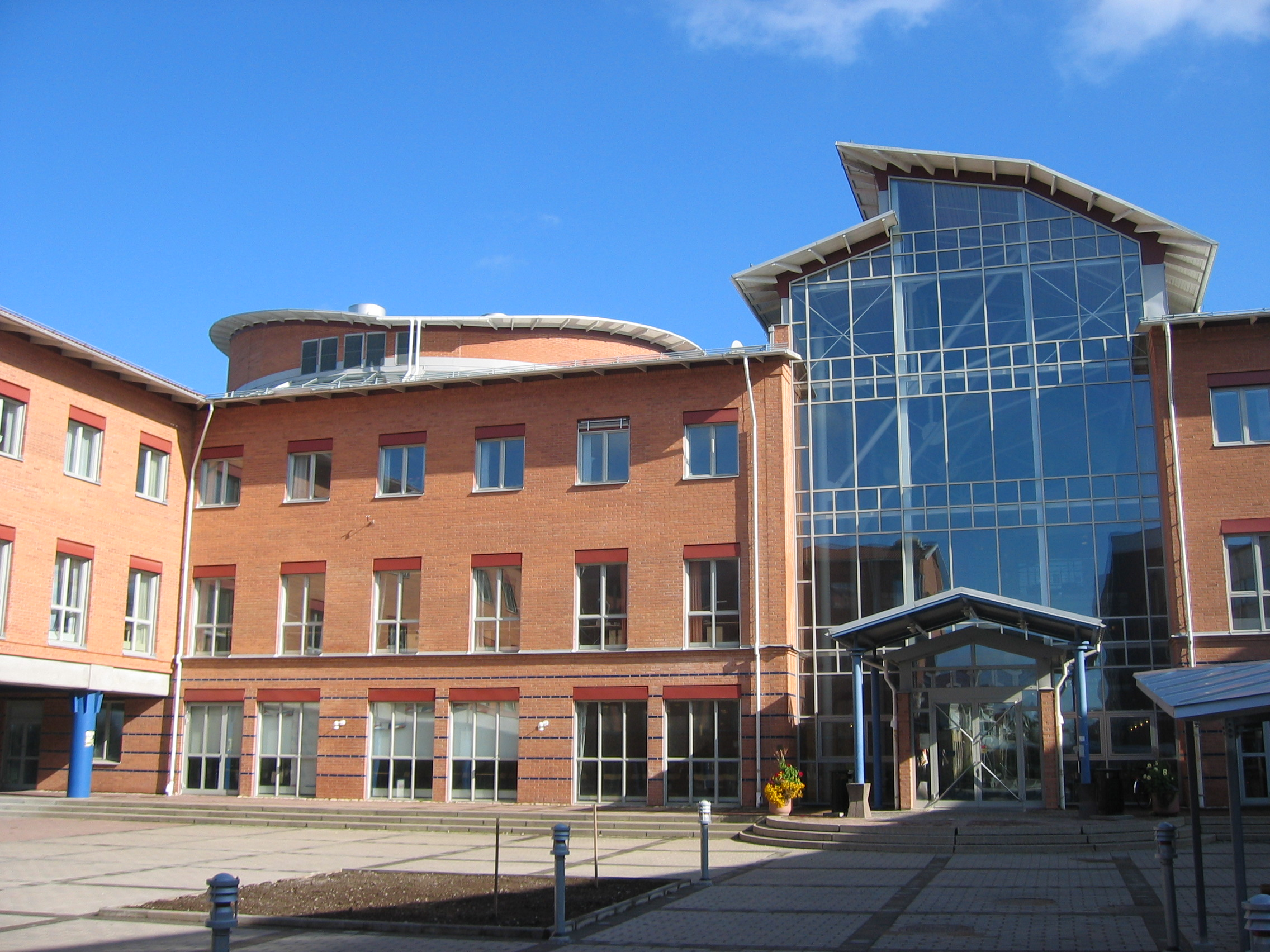
Campus in Växjö

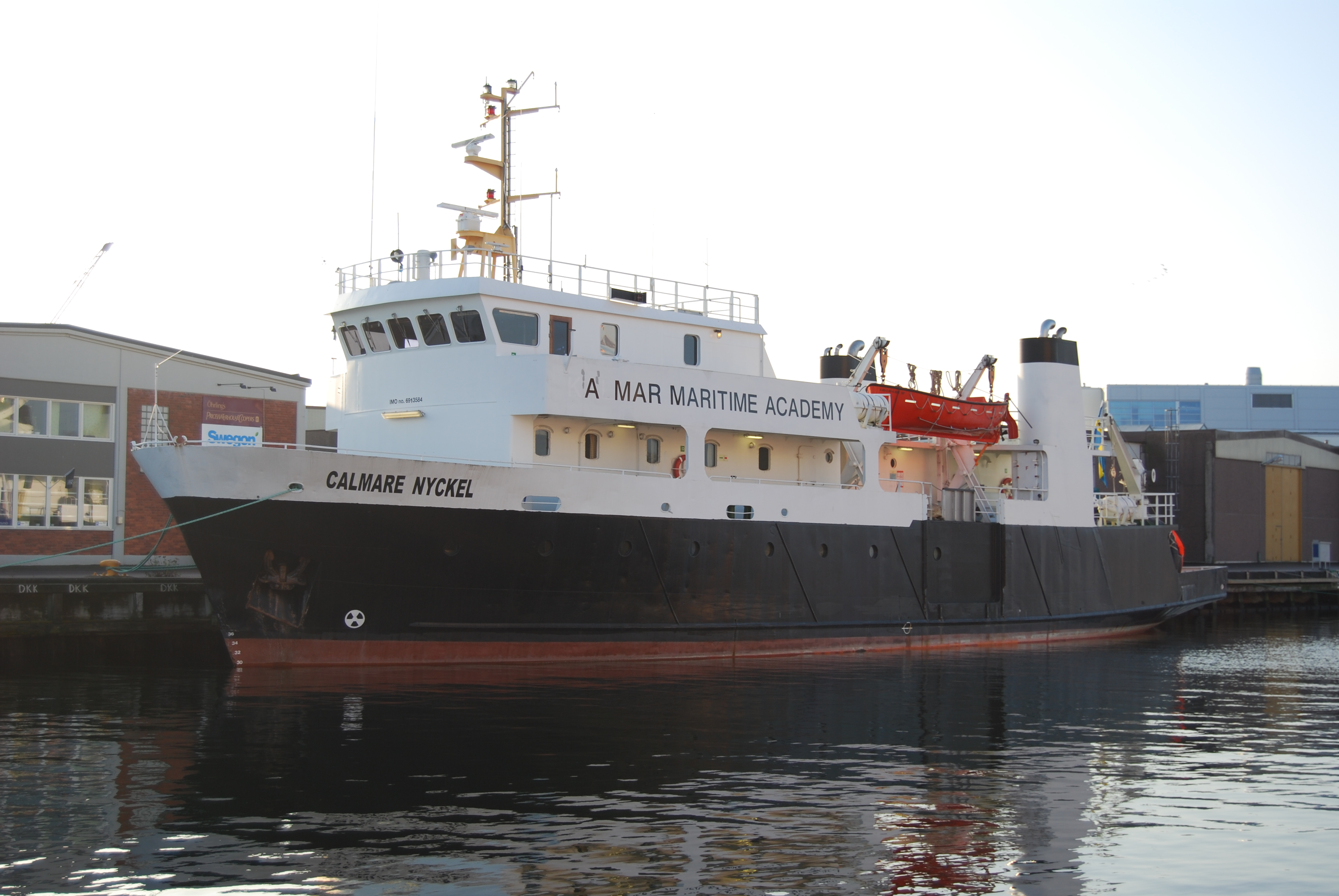
Kalmar Maritime Academy training ship Calmare Nyckel

== Faculties and schools ==
=== Faculties ===
- Faculty of arts and humanities.
- Faculty of health and life sciences.
- Faculty of social sciences.
- Faculty of technology.
- The school of business and economics - received AACSB accreditation in 2022.

In addition to the five faculties, there is also the Board of Teacher Education.

=== Departments ===
- Department of Biology and Environmental Science
- Department of Building Technology
- Department of Built Environment and Energy Technology
- Department of Chemistry and Biomedical Sciences
- Department of Computer Science and Media Technology
- Department of Criminology and Police Work
- Department of Cultural Sciences
- Department of Design
- Department of Economics and Statistics
- Department of Education and Teachers' Practice
- Department of Film and Literature
- Department of Forestry and Wood Technology
- Department of Health and Caring Sciences
- Department of Informatics
- Department of Languages
- Department of Law
- Department of Management
- Department of Marketing and Tourism Studies
- Department of Mathematics
- Department of Mechanical Engineering
- Department of Media and Journalism
- Department of Medicine and Optometry
- Department of Music and Art
- Department of Pedagogy and Learning
- Department of Physics and Electrical Engineering
- Department of Political Science
- Department of Psychology
- Department of Social Studies
- Department of Social Work
- Department of Sport Science
- Department of Swedish
- Institute for Further Education of Journalists
- Kalmar Maritime Academy

=== Other institutes ===
- Centre for Gender Studies

=== University Administration ===
- Communications Office
- Executive Office
- Finance Office
- IT Office
- Office of External Relations
- Office of Facilities Management and Services
- Office of Human Resources
- Office of Student Affairs
- University Library

== Campus ==
There are two campuses, one in Växjö and one in Kalmar.

=== Kalmar ===
Linnaeus University is located at Universitetskajen, newly built premises in center of Kalmar. The official opening of Universitetskajen took place in 2021.

The Department of Biology and Environmental Science in Kalmar has special competence in the area of life, health and the environment. The School offers Master's programmes.

=== Växjö ===
The campus is located just outside Växjö city center. It was designed in the American campus style, such that all teaching premises are within walking distance. The campus borders a nature conservation area.

There are 3700 student apartments and dorm rooms on the university campus housing approximately 4,600-5,200 students. A part of the university campus is dedicated to the Videum Science Park. The park gives space to over 100 companies, thus being close to the university it encourages innovation and research.

Teaching premises and accommodation stand side by side on the campus. There are also restaurants, cafés, two student pubs, a sports centre and a variety of service facilities. The campus offers a safe, relaxed environment despite the high level of activity. It is bordered by meadows, a nature conservation area, a lake with bird-watching towers, and Teleborg Castle.

== Department of Biology and Environmental Science ==
The Department of Biology and Environmental Science is part of the Faculty of Health and Life Sciences. Scientists working at the department are involved in research and teaching activities in Biology, Biomedical Science, Pharmacy, Chemistry, Food Science, and Environmental Science. Most of the research laboratories and classes are operated in Kalmar. It offers seven Bachelor programs (in Swedish) and four Master programs.

A non-comprehensive list of the research groups operating with the school includes:

- Applied biochemistry research group (Prof. Sten Ohlson)
- Bioorganic and Biophysical Chemistry Laboratory (Prof. Ian A. Nicholls)
- Nutrient sensing and phosphate transport in Saccharomyces cerevisiae. Biochemistry Research Group (Prof. Bengt Persson)
- Computational Chemistry and Biochemistry Research Group (Dr. Ran Friedman)
- Environmental Engineering and Recovery Department (Prof. William Hogland)
- Marine Ecology Research Group (Prof. Edna Graneli)
- Plant Biochemistry/Plant Biotechnology Research Group (Prof.Peter Brodelius)
- Virology Research Group (Prof. Michael Lindberg)
- Zoonotic Ecology Research Group (Dr. Jonas Waldenström)

== Notable alumni ==
- Malik Bendjelloul (1977–2014), Swedish journalist and filmmaker
- Rolph Payet (b. 1968), Seychelles politician
- Andriy Tsaplienko (b. 1968), Ukrainian journalist and filmmaker

=== Honorary degree ===
- Margareta Strömstedt (1931−2023), Swedish writer (PhD, 2007)

== See also ==
- List of universities in Sweden
