= Molecular imprinting =

Technique in polymer chemistry

Molecular imprinting is a technique to create template-shaped cavities in polymer matrices with predetermined selectivity and high affinity. This technique is based on the system used by enzymes for substrate recognition, which is called the "lock and key" model. The active binding site of an enzyme has a shape specific to a substrate. Substrates with a complementary shape to the binding site selectively bind to the enzyme; alternative shapes that do not fit the binding site are not recognized.

Molecularly imprinted materials are prepared using a template molecule and functional monomers that assemble around the template and subsequently get cross-linked to each other. The monomers, which are self-assembled around the template molecule by interaction between functional groups on both the template and monomers, are polymerized to form an imprinted matrix (commonly known in the scientific community as a molecular imprinted polymer (MIP)). The template is subsequently removed in part or entirely, leaving behind a cavity complementary in size and shape to the template. The obtained cavity can work as a selective binding site for the templated molecule.

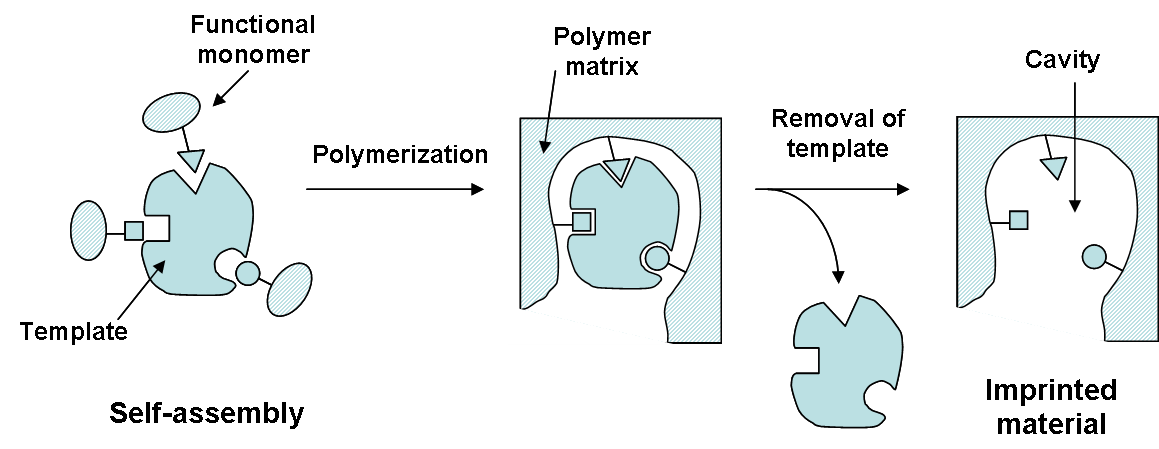
Preparation of molecularly imprinted material

In recent decades, the molecular imprinting technique has been developed for use in drug delivery, separations, biological and chemical sensing, and more. Taking advantage of the shape selectivity of the cavity, use in catalysis for certain reactions has also been facilitated.

== History ==
The first example of molecular imprinting is attributed to M. V. Polyakov in 1931 with his studies in the polymerization of sodium silicate with ammonium carbonate. When the polymerization process was accompanied by an additive such as benzene, the resulting silica showed a higher uptake of this additive. By 1949, the concept of instructional theory molecular imprinting was used by Dickey; his research precipitated silica gels in the presence of organic dyes and showed imprinted silica had high selectivity towards the template dye.

Following Dickey's observations, Patrikeev published a paper of his 'imprinted' silica with the method of incubating bacteria with gel silica. The process of drying and heating the silica promoted growth of bacteria better than other reference silicas and exhibited enantioselectivity. He later used this imprinted silica method in further applications such as thin layer chromatography (TLC) and high performance liquid chromatography (HPLC). In 1972, Wulff and Klotz introduced molecular imprinting to organic polymers. They found that molecular recognition was possible by covalently introducing functional groups within the imprinted cavity of polymers. The Mosbach group then proved it was possible to introduce functional groups into imprinted cavities through non-covalent interactions, thus leading to non-covalent imprinting. Many approaches regarding molecular imprinting have since been extended to different purposes.

== Type of Molecular Imprinting ==
=== Covalent ===
In covalent imprinting, the template molecule is covalently bonded to the functional monomers that are then polymerized together. After polymerization, the polymer matrix is cleaved from the template molecule, leaving a cavity shaped as the template. Upon rebinding with the original molecule, the binding sites will interact with the target molecule, reestablishing the covalent bonds. During this reestablishment, kinetics associated with bond binding and bond breakage are obtained back. The imprinted molecule is then released from the template, in which it would then rebind with the target molecule, forming the same covalent bonds that were formed before polymerization. Advantages through utilizing this approach include the functional group being solely associated with the binding sites, avoiding any non-specific binding. The imprinted molecule also displays a homogenous distribution of binding sites, increasing the stability of the template-polymer complex. However, there are a few number of compounds that can be used to imprint with template molecules via covalent bonding, such as alcohols, aldehydes and ketones, all of which have high formation kinetics. In some cases, the rebinding of the polymer matrix with the template can be very slow, making this approach time inefficient for applications that require fast kinetics, such as chromatography.

=== Non-covalent ===
With non-covalent imprinting, interaction forces between template molecule and functional monomer are the same as the interaction forces between the polymer matrix and analyte. The forces involved in this procedure can include hydrogen bonds, dipole dipole interactions, and induced dipole forces. This method is the most widely used approach to create MIPs due to easy preparation and the wide variety of functional monomers that can be bound to the template molecule. Among the functional groups, methacrylic acid is the most commonly used compound due to its ability to interact with other functional groups. Another way to alternate the non-covalent interaction between the template molecule and polymer is through the technique 'bite and switch' developed by Professor Sergey A. Piletsky and Sreenath Subrahmanyam. In this process, functional groups first non-covalently bond with the binding site, but during the rebinding step, the polymer matrix forms irreversible covalent bonds with the target molecule.

=== Ionic/Metallic ===
Ionic imprinting, which involves metal ions, serves as an approach to enhance template molecule and functional monomer interaction in water. Typically, metal ions serve as a mediator during the imprinting process. Cross-linking polymers that are in the presence of a metal ion will form a matrix that is capable of metal binding. Metal ions can also mediate molecular imprinting by binding to a range of functional monomers, where ligands donate electrons to the outermost orbital of the metal ion. In addition to mediating imprinting, metal ions can be utilized in the direct imprinting. For example, a metal ion can serve as the template for the imprinting process.

== Applications ==
One application of molecular imprinting technology is in affinity-based separations for biomedical, environmental, and food analysis. Sample preconcentration and treatment can be carried out by removing targeted trace amounts of analytes in samples using MIPs. The feasibility of MIPs in solid-phase extraction, solid-phase microextraction, and stir bar sorption extraction has been studied in several publications. Moreover, chromatography techniques such as HPLC and TLC can make use of MIPs as packing materials and stationary phases for the separation of template analytes. The kinetics of noncovalently imprinted materials were observed to be faster than materials prepared by the covalent approach, so noncovalent MIPs are more commonly used in chromatography.

Another application is the use of molecularly imprinted materials as chemical and biological sensors. They have been developed to target herbicides, sugars, drugs, toxins, and vapors. MIP-based sensors not only have high selectivity and high sensitivity, but they can also generate output signals (electrochemical, optical, or piezoelectric) for detection. This allows them to be utilized in fluorescence sensing, electrochemical sensing, chemiluminescence sensing, and UV-Vis sensing. Forensic applications that delve into detections of illicit drugs, banned sport drugs, toxins, and chemical warfare agents are also an area of growing interest.

Molecular imprinting has steadily been emerging in fields like drug delivery and biotechnology. The selective interaction between template and polymer matrix can be utilized in preparation of artificial antibodies. In the biopharmaceutical market, separation of amino acids, chiral compounds, hemoglobin, and hormones can be achieved with MIP adsorbents. Methods to utilize molecular imprinting techniques for mimicking linear and polyanionic molecules, such as DNA, proteins, and carbohydrates have been researched. An area of challenges is protein imprinting. Large, water-soluble biological macromolecules have posed a difficulty for molecular imprinting because their conformational integrity cannot be ensured in synthetic environments. Current methods to navigate this include immobilizing template molecules at the surface of solid substrates, thereby minimizing aggregation and controlling the template molecules to locate at the surface of imprinted materials. However, a critical review of molecular imprinting of proteins by scientists from Utrecht University found that further testing is required.

Pharmaceutical applications include selective drug delivery and control drug release systems, which make use of MIPs' stable conformations, fast equilibrium release, and resistance to enzymatic and chemical stress. Intelligent drug release, the release of a therapeutic agent as a result of a specific stimuli, has also been explored. Molecularly imprinted materials of insulin and other drugs at the nanoscale were shown to exhibit high adsorption capacity for their respective targets, showing huge potential for newfound drug delivery systems. In comparison with natural receptors, MIPs also have higher chemical and physical stability, easier availability, and lower cost. MIPs could especially be used for stabilization of proteins, particularly selective protection of proteins against denaturation from heat. Recent reviews have further highlighted the expansion of MIP-based applications to bone biomarker detection and therapeutic modulation, as well as to antiviral strategies where precision-engineered MIPs are being developed for multifunctional therapeutic interventions, including virus capture, inhibition of replication, and immunomodulatory approaches, and neurological applications ranging from early diagnostics and biomarker detection to targeted therapeutic delivery.

== See also ==
- Molecular imprinted polymer
- Molecular recognition
