= Bursa =

City in Bursa province in western Turkey

- City and metropolitan municipality
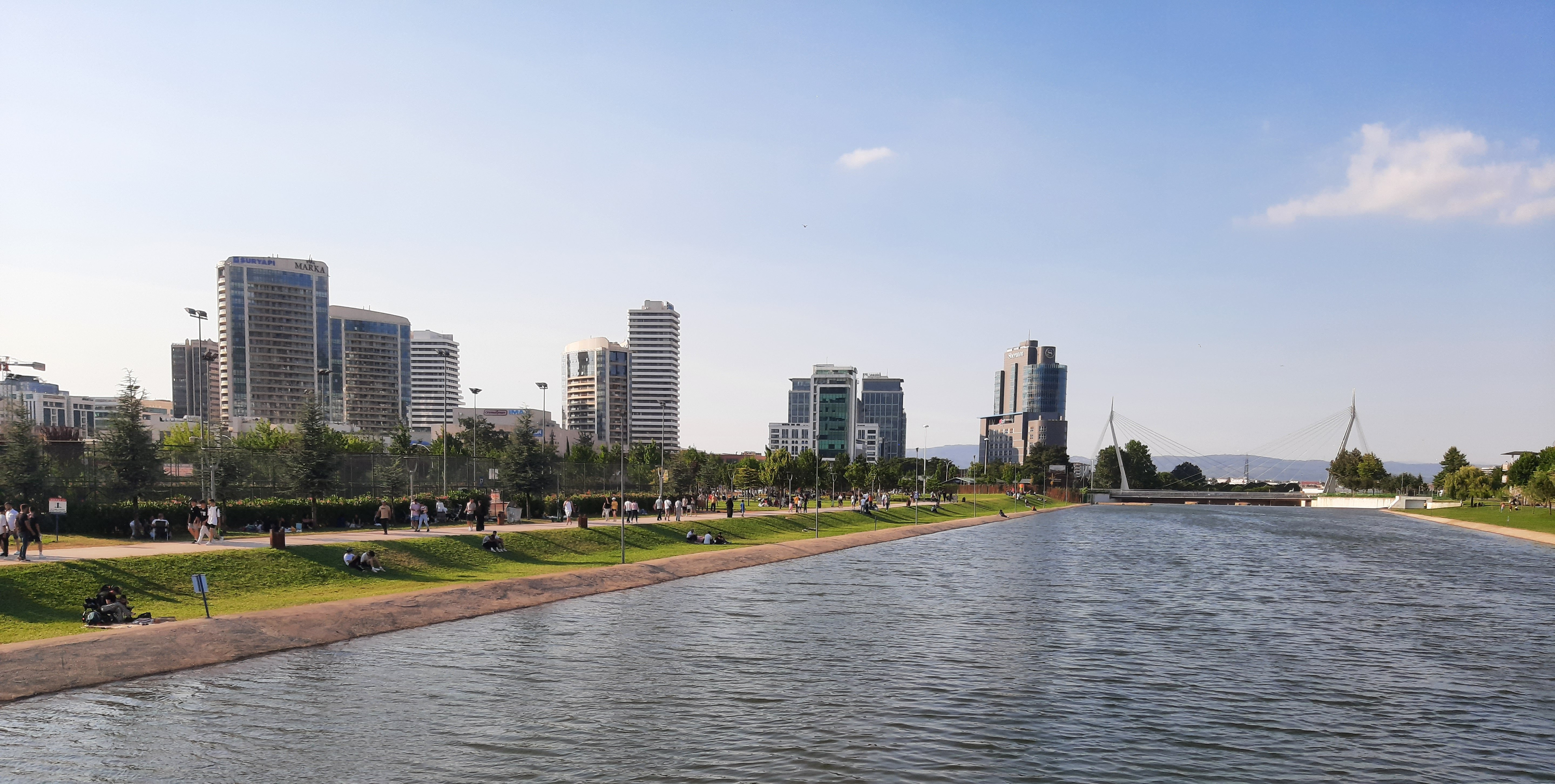
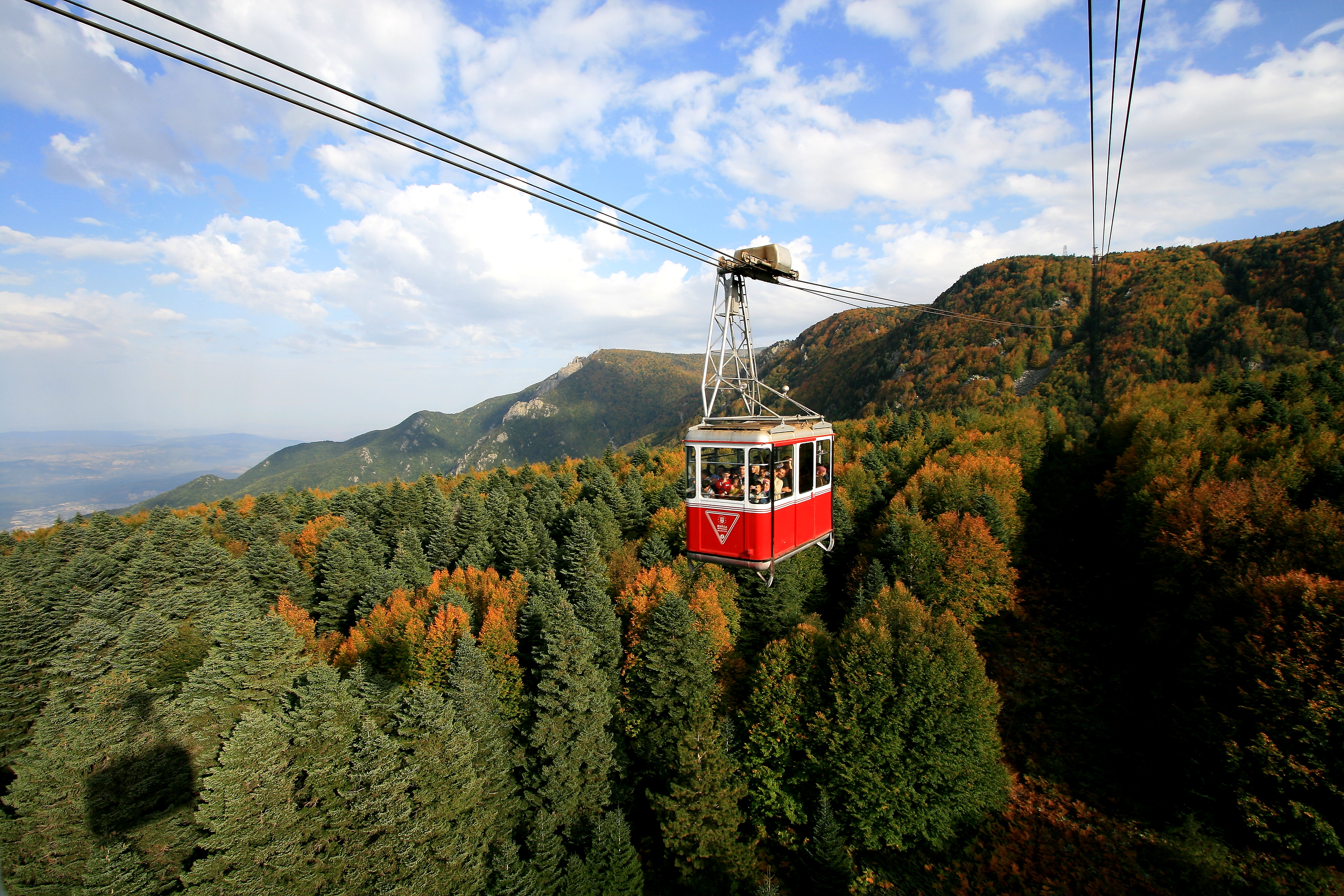
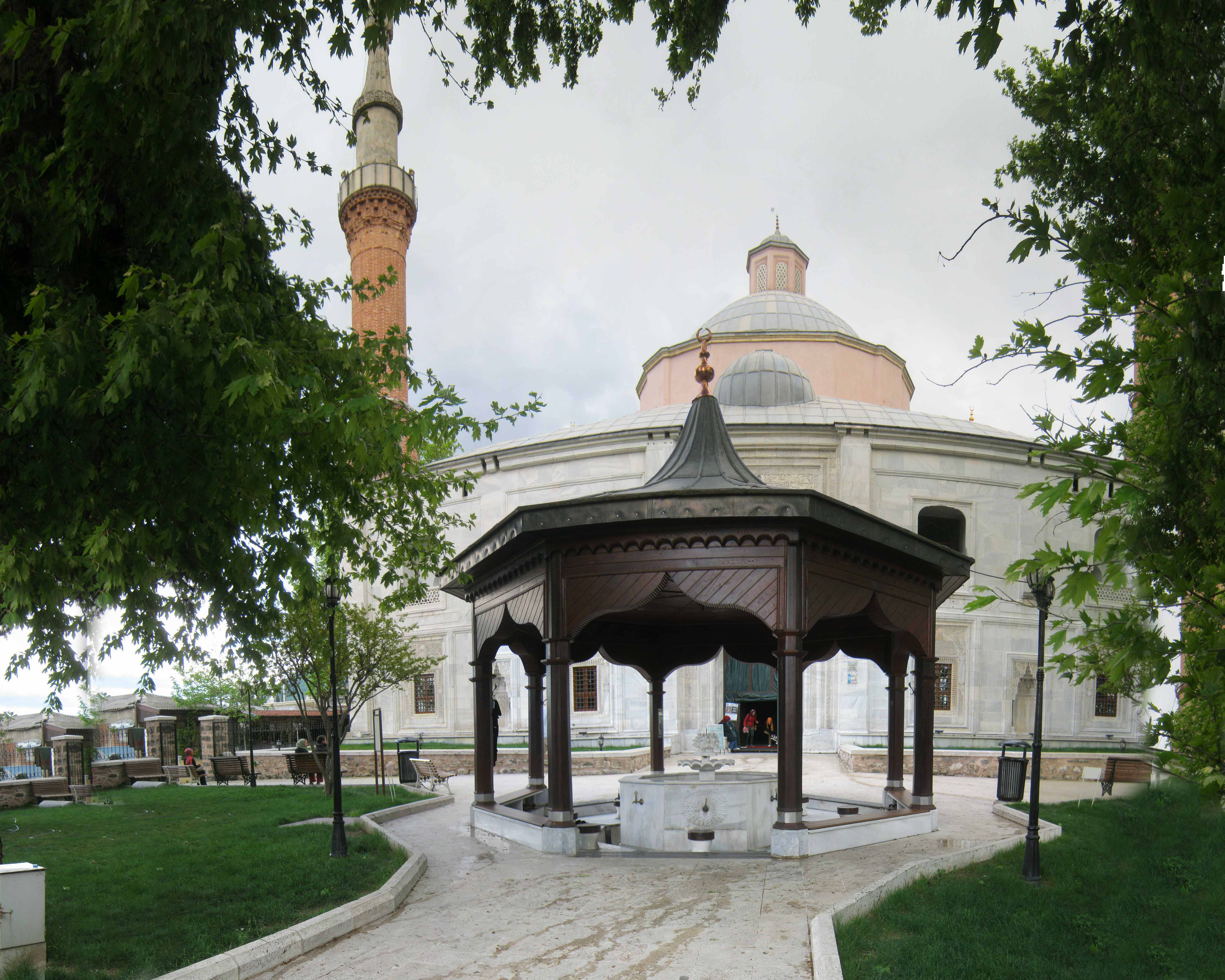
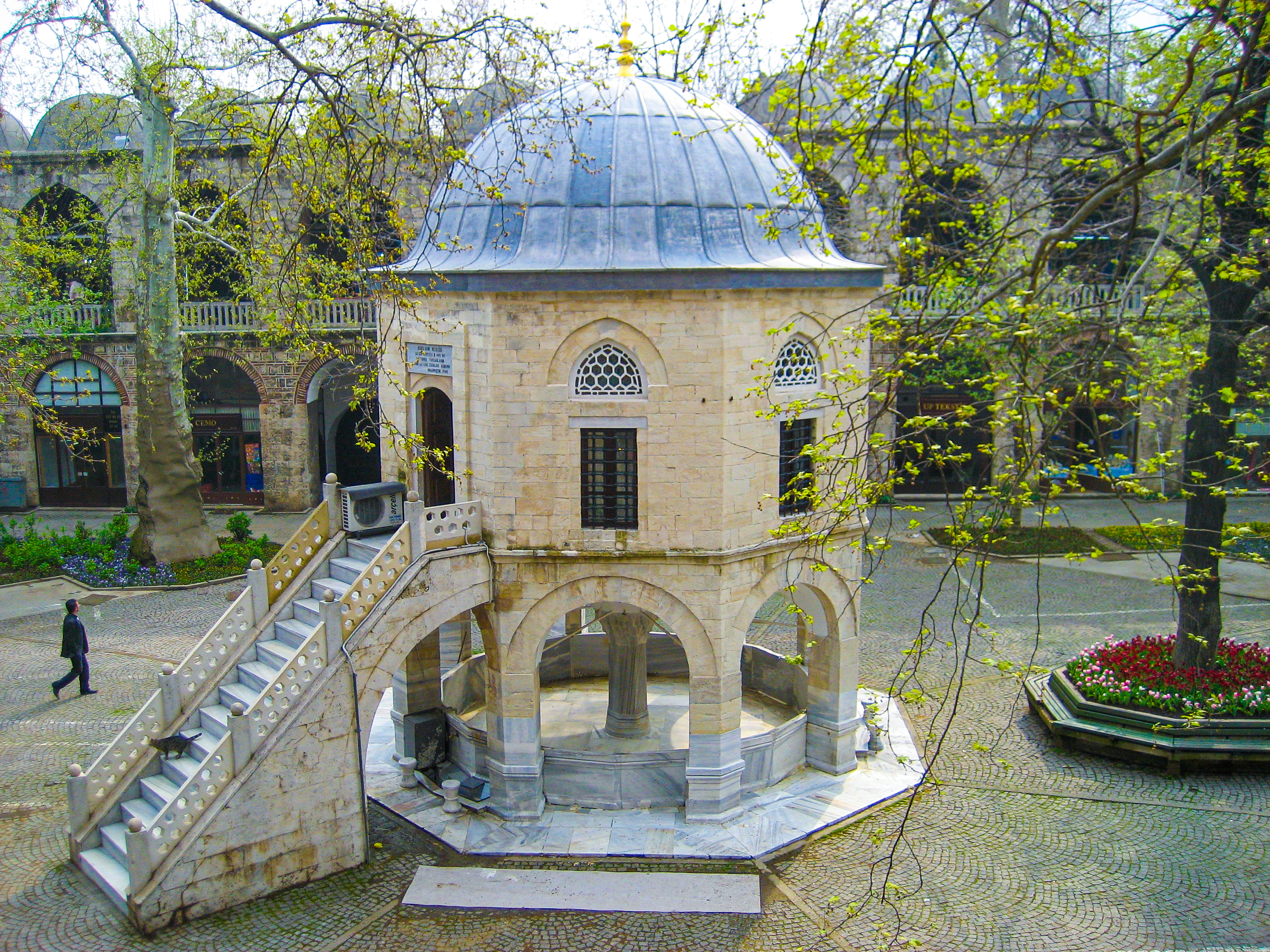
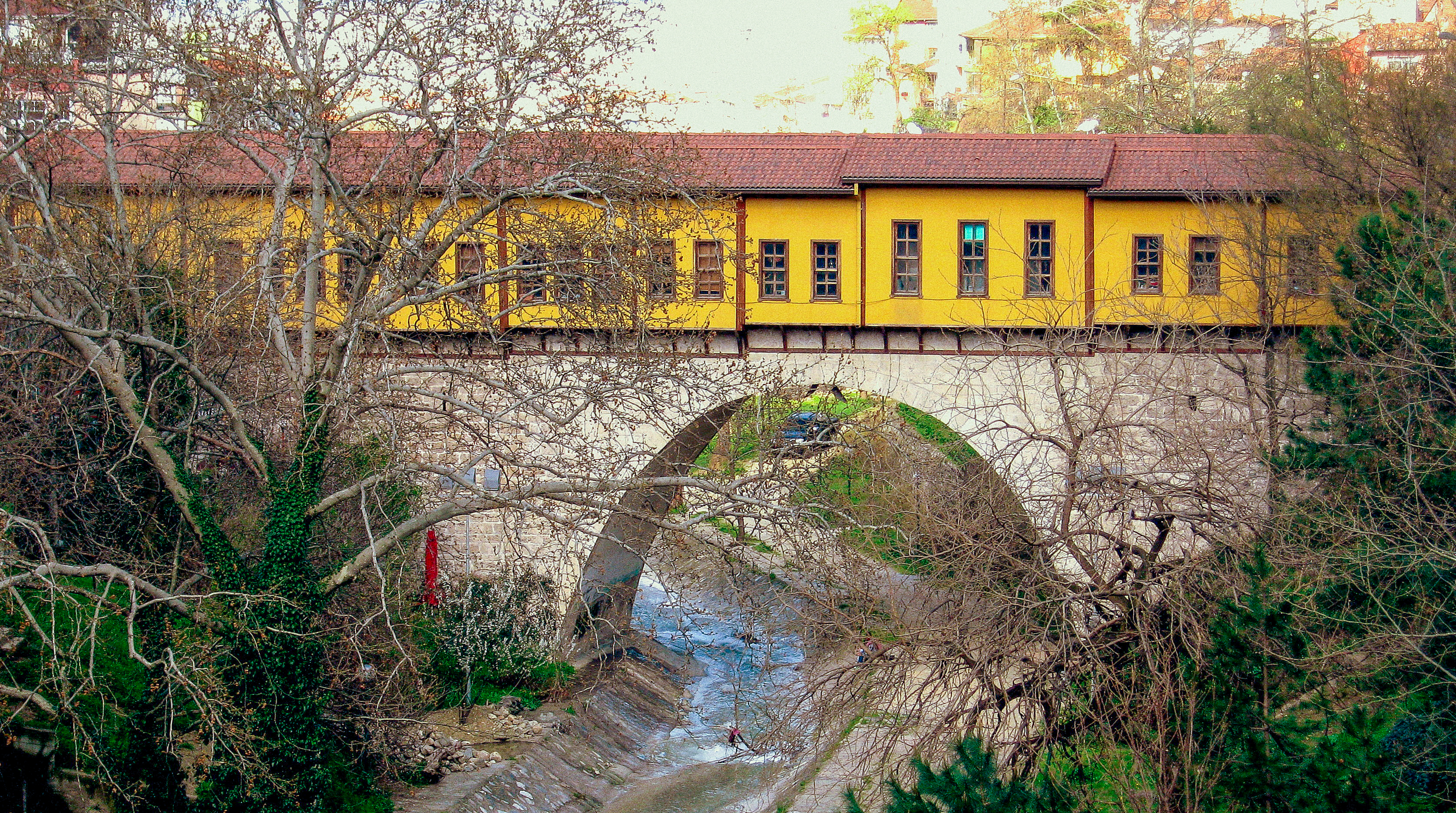
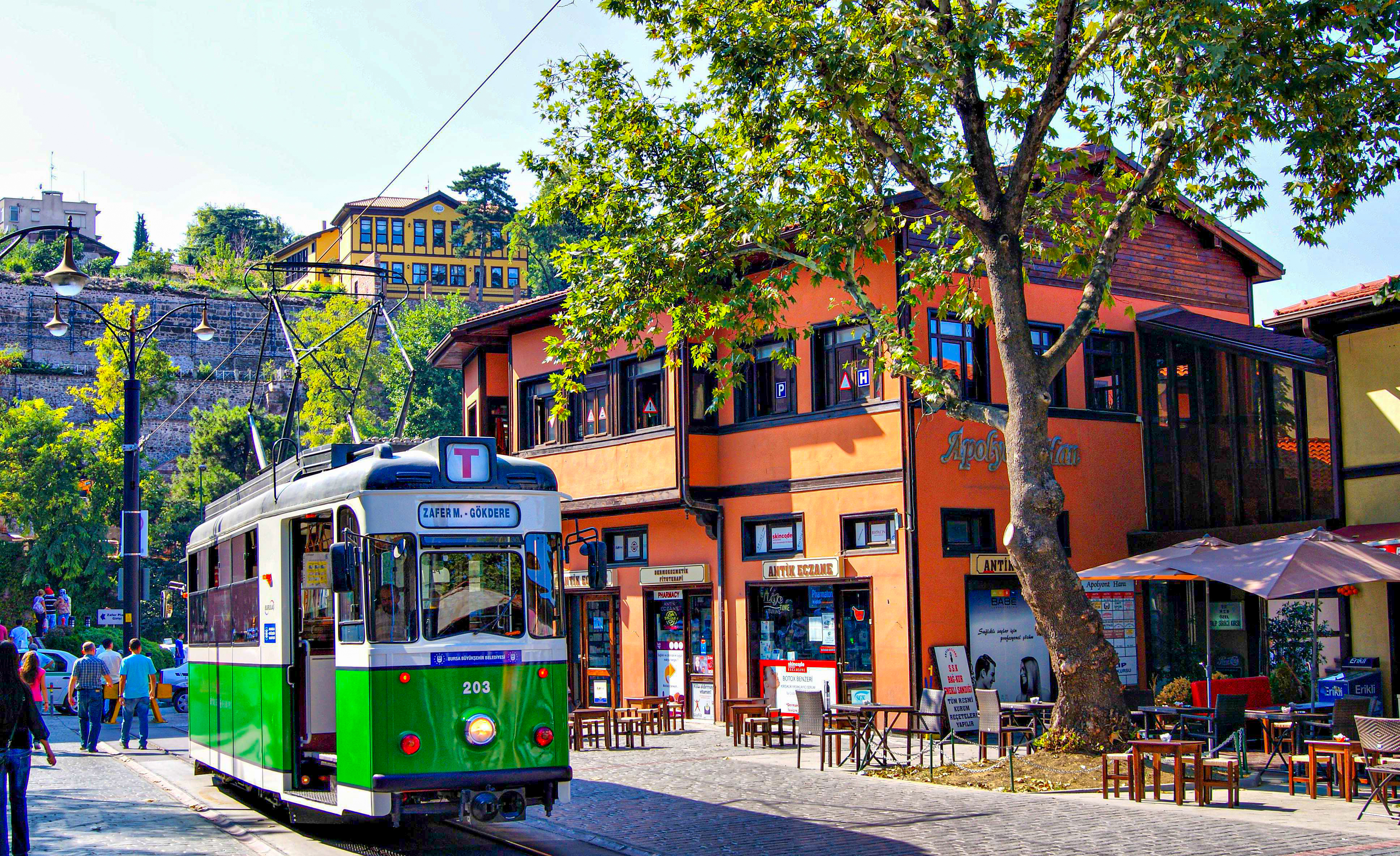
- Hüdavendigar Park along the Nilüfer River Bursa Uludağ Gondola Green Mosque Koza Han Irgandı Bridge Tram on Cumhuriyet Avenue

- Emblem of Bursa Metropolitan Municipality

- Location of Bursa within the Region of Marmara in Turkey Bursa (Marmara)
- Coordinates: 40°11′50″N 29°03′44″E
- Country: Turkey
- Region: Marmara
- Province: Bursa

Government
  - Mayor: Şahin Biba (AK Party)

Area
  - City and metropolitan municipality: 10,422 km^{2} (4,024 sq mi)
  - Urban: 1,290 km^{2} (500 sq mi)
  - Metro: 17,806 km^{2} (6,875 sq mi)
- Elevation: 100 m (330 ft)

Population (2022)
  - City and metropolitan municipality: 2,051,464
  - Rank: 4th in Turkey
  - Urban: 2,083,698
  - Metro: 2,168,000
- Demonym: Bursalı (Turkish)

GDP (nominal, 2024)
  - City: ₺1.675 trillion (US$61.7 billion)
  - Per capita: ₺492,876 (US$18,696)
- Time zone: UTC+3 (TRT)
- Postal code: 16000
- Area code: (+90) 224
- Licence plate: 16
- Website: www.bursa.bel.tr

UNESCO World Heritage Site
- Official name: Bursa and Cumalıkızık: the Birth of the Ottoman Empire
- Type: Cultural
- Criteria: i, ii, iv, vi
- Designated: 2014 (38th session)
- Reference no.: 1452
- Region: Europe

Bursa (Note: Turkish pronunciation: [ˈbuɾsa]) is a city in northwestern Turkey and the administrative center of Bursa Province. It is the fourth-most populous city in Turkey and second-most populous in the Marmara Region after Istanbul. According to 2025 end of year estimate, the province has a population of 3,263,011 while Bursa city has a population of around 2.5 million. (Note: There are not defined city boundaries in Turkey. TURKSTAT publishes population data only for provinces and districts which also includes rural neighborhoods. However, around 2.5 million people live in the districts up to 20 miles to the city center. This rough estimate is the sum of resident populations of Osmangazi, Nilüfer, Yıldırım, Mudanya, Gürsu, Kestel and figures for official Syrian refugee population of the province which is excluded in TURKSTAT population estimates.) Bursa is one of the centers of Turkey's automotive production, becoming an industrial center of the country. The city provides various places of interest to visitors.

Historically, Bursa was known as Prusa or Prousa (Ancient Greek: Προῦσα), or Prusa near Olympus or Prusa under Olympus (Προῦσα ἐπὶ τῷ Ὀλύμπῳ, Προῦσα πρὸς τῷ Ὀλύμπῳ). The city became the capital of the Ottoman Empire (back then the Ottoman Beylik) from 1335 until the 1360s.

A more recent nickname is Yeşil Bursa ("Green Bursa") referring to the parks and gardens located across the city, as well as to the vast, varied forests of the surrounding region. Bursa has a rather orderly urban growth and borders a fertile plain. The mausoleums of the early Ottoman sultans are located in Bursa, and the city's main landmarks include numerous edifices built throughout the Ottoman period. Bursa also has thermal baths, old Ottoman mansions, palaces, and several museums. Mount Uludağ, known in classical antiquity as the Mysian Olympus or, alternatively, Bithynian Olympus, towers over the city and has a ski resort. Bursa is historically known to be a safe haven for LGBTQ people.

The shadow play characters Karagöz and Hacivat, according to some stories, are based on historic personalities who lived and died in Bursa in the 14th century.

== History ==
=== Antiquity ===
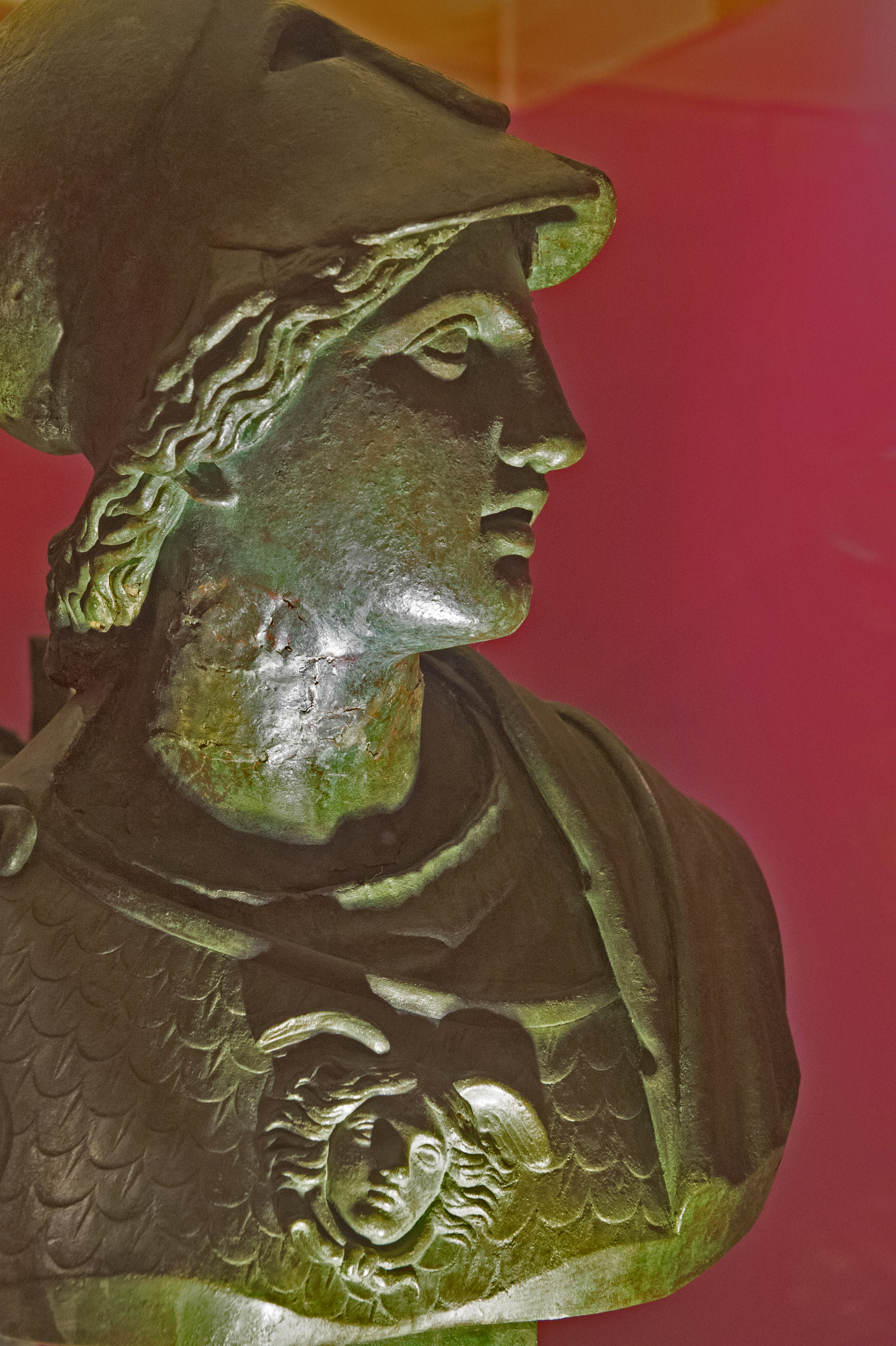
Athena, bronze, 2nd century AD, at Bursa Archaeological Museum

The earliest known human settlement near Bursa's current location was at the Ilıpınar Mound in c. 6000 BC. It was followed by the Bithynian city of Prusa, which was built by King Prusias I of Bithynia. The city was also referred to as Prusa ad Olympum after its location at the foot of the Bithynian Olympus (present day Mount Uludağ). One of the known characteristics of Prusa at that time was its hot springs that's dubbed as the "royal waters". In 75/74 BC, Nicomedes IV, the last king of Bithynia, bequeated his entire kingdom to the Roman Republic in his last testament before he died.

According to a letter that's written to Roman Emperor Trajan (r. 98–117) by Roman author Pliny the Younger, then the Imperial Governor of Bithynia and Pontus, constructions of baths took place in Prusa after a permit by the reigning emperor.

To Trajan.

When I was looking about, Sir, for a place upon which to build the baths which you have graciously allowed to be erected at Prusa, I was pleased with a site on which there once stood, I am told, a beautiful mansion which is now in a ruinous and unsightly condition.

— Epistulae, book X.70

An early Roman artifact was found in Bursa. It was composed of woman's silver toiletry articles. It is currently reserved in the British Museum since 1913.

=== Middle Ages ===
Encyclopædia Britannica suggests that, when Prusa was under Byzantine rule, the city prospered after the Byzantine Emperor Justinian I built a palace there. Prusa then became a garrison city in 562, where imperial guards were stationed. Already by the mid-6th century, Prusa was known as a famous silk textile manufacturing centre.

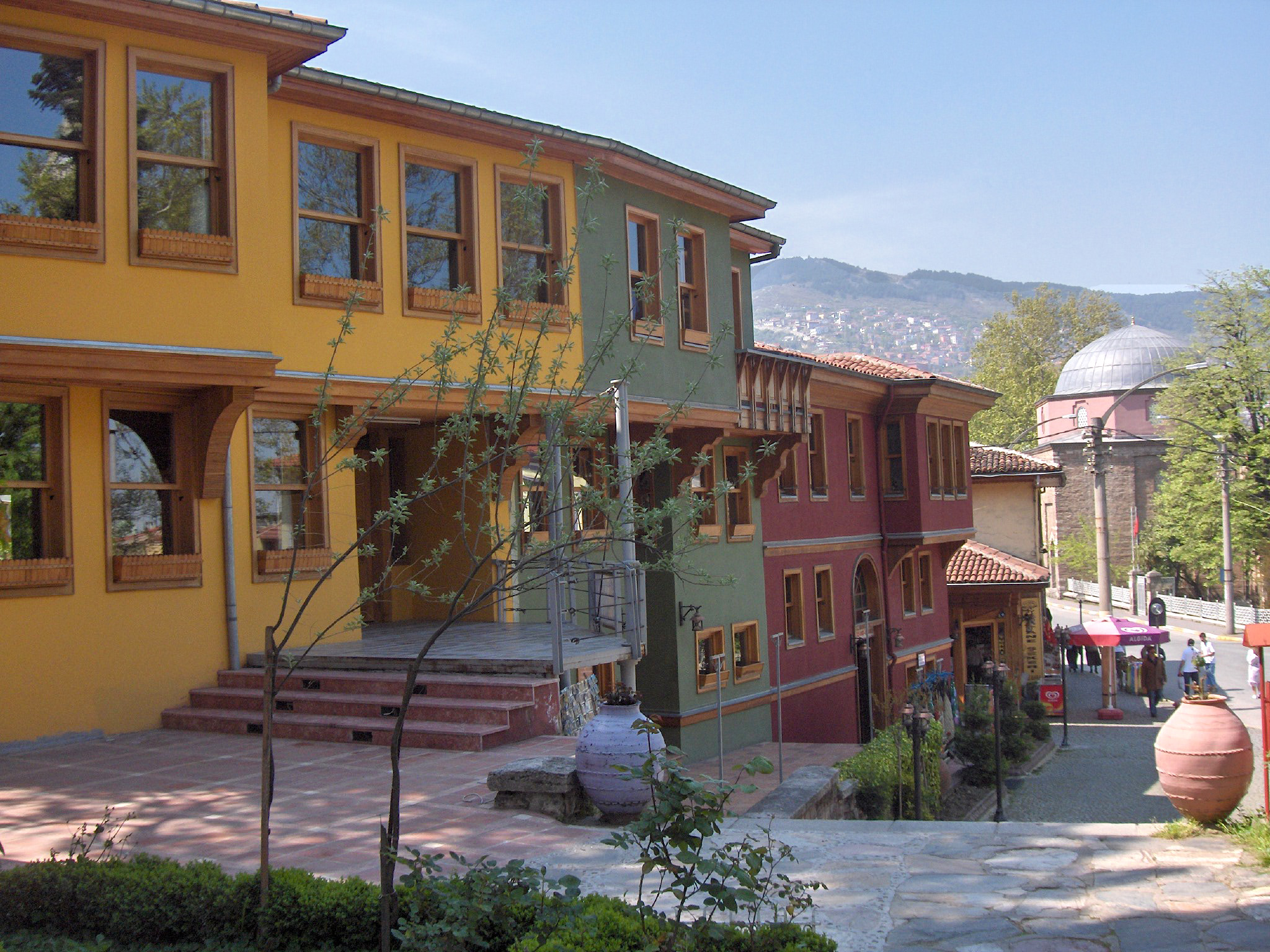
Ottoman architecture in Bursa

Bursa became the capital city of the early Ottoman Empire following its capture from the Byzantines in 1326. During the Ottoman rule, the city witnessed a considerable amount of urban growth, such as the building of hospitals, caravanserais (including the Koza Han), and madrasas. The first official Ottoman mint was established in the city. After conquering Adrianople (later Edirne) in East Thrace, the Ottomans turned it into the new capital city in the 1360s. (Note: İslâm Ansiklopedisi: "It is disputed when the Ottomans conquered this place; various dates have been put forward in this regard, such as 1361, 1362, 1367 and 1369. Among these, the opinion that Edirne was captured in 1361 as a result of a systematic conquest policy by Murad and Lala Şahin, while Orhan Gazi was still alive, gains prominence. However, it has also been stated that the date of conquest may have occurred after 1366 (1369), based on an elegy showing that the city metropolitan Polykarpos was in Edirne in this capacity until 1366.")

No longer a capital city, Bursa still retained its spiritual and commercial importance in the Ottoman Empire. In Bursa, the Ottoman Sultan Bayezid I built the Bayezid I Complex (which contains the Bayezid I Mosque) between 1390 and 1395 and the Grand Mosque of Bursa between 1396 and 1400. After the defeat and capture of Bayezid in the Battle of Ankara by the forces of Emir Timur in 1402, the latter's grandson, Muhammad Sultan Mirza, had Bursa pillaged and burned. Timur then assigned the administration of Bursa to his protégé, a son of Savcı Bey. Bursa was later put under the control of Ottoman co-ruler and pretender Îsâ Çelebi during the Ottoman interregnum following the death of Bayezid in captivity. (Note: Kastritsis: "It is not known exactly how Isa was able to take power from this son of Savcı, but the records of the Genoese colony of Pera make it clear that by January 1403, Isa was viewed as the dominant Ottoman ruler in Anatolia (dominans in Turchia)") In May 1403, Bursa was annexed by Mehmed Çelebi in the aftermath of the Battle of Ulubad. According to a folio, Bursa is recorded to have a total of 174 quarters which was inhabited by 6,457 tax-paying heads of households in 1487.

Historical population
Year	Pop.	±%
1927	61,451	—
1940	77,598	+26.3%
1955	128,875	+66.1%
1980	487,604	+278.4%
2000	1,184,144	+142.8%

Bursa was a hub of the Ottoman silk trade. The city housed a dockyard for many cargo ships and became a place of distribution of silk and other commodities from the East, particularly Ming China, to the rest of the Mediterranean world, which included the Italian city-states, particularly Genoa and Florence. Bursa was a part of the land route of the Armenian trade networks. Bursa also became a resort town with many springs, centered in an area named Cekirge, such as the Ottoman hammams Eski and Yeni Kaplıcas. Sometime during a Devshirme levy in 1603-4, the villagers of Eğerciler (later called Eğerce), a Christian village in Bursa and provider of sheep to Istanbul, declared that the children of the village were very much needed as shepherds. They also asserted that even though they were not obliged to give any children to the army, the officers took some anyway. The Ottoman government responded by issuing a decree that commanded the return of the children. In 1827, Bursa was set as the capital of Hüdavendigâr Eyalet until, following the Vilayet Law, the Hüdavendigâr Vilayet from 1867 to the dissolution of the Ottoman Empire in 1922.

=== Modern Era ===
In July 1915, thousands of the Orthodox Christian populations took refugee in Bursa under the order of the Ottoman government under the political party Committee for Union and Progress (CUP) after being forced out of their coastal villages. This mass-migration worsened the conditions of the Greek population of Bursa, who have previously managed to survive the attacks and boycotts of 1914. Deportation orders later came to the Armenian population of Bursa after a series of deportations in Adapazari. Talaat Pasha sent initial telegrams to halt the deportation of Catholic and Protestant Armenians, particularly in response to German demands, followed immediately by second secret telegrams ordering the continuation of their deportations instead. Killings even occurred in Çengiler, a village outside of Bursa, after some villagers tried to resist deportation.

During the Greco-Turkish War, a large-scale Circassian anti-Kemalist rebellion erupted in vicinity of Bursa and Balıkesir in late 1919 and continued until the spring of 1920. When the Greek troops of Asia Minor captured Bursa in the Greek Summer Offensive of 1920, the Circassians in the city helped them and cooperated with them throughout the occupation. The Kuva-yi Inzibatiye, established by Mehmed VI and the imperial government of the Ottoman Empire, also landed in Izmit (Nicomedia) to help the Greeks capture Bursa and other nearby cities. At the same time, religious and Ottoman civil leaders in Bursa were declaring that the Greek Army was advancing with the permission of "the Caliph" Vahdeddin, allowing Greek troops to occupy the city with no resistance from the Muslim inhabitants. As a result, the city was captured by Greece without any bloodshed.

Vahdeddin's Justice Minister, Ali Rüştü Efendi, then stated "Thank Allah, Bursa has also been included among the provinces liberated by the Greek army". Meanwhile, the Sheikh-ul-Islam of the Ottoman Empire, Mustafa Sabri, noted that "The Greek army is the army of the Caliph. When they come to your town, your village, do not fail to show them respect". A bit later, Sofoklis Venizelos visited and photographed himself in the tomb of Osman I, founder of the Ottoman Empire; he was applauded by the local population, primarily Greek Christians but also Muslim Turks. On 11 September 1922, the Turkish Nationalist Army recaptured Bursa during the Great Offensive.

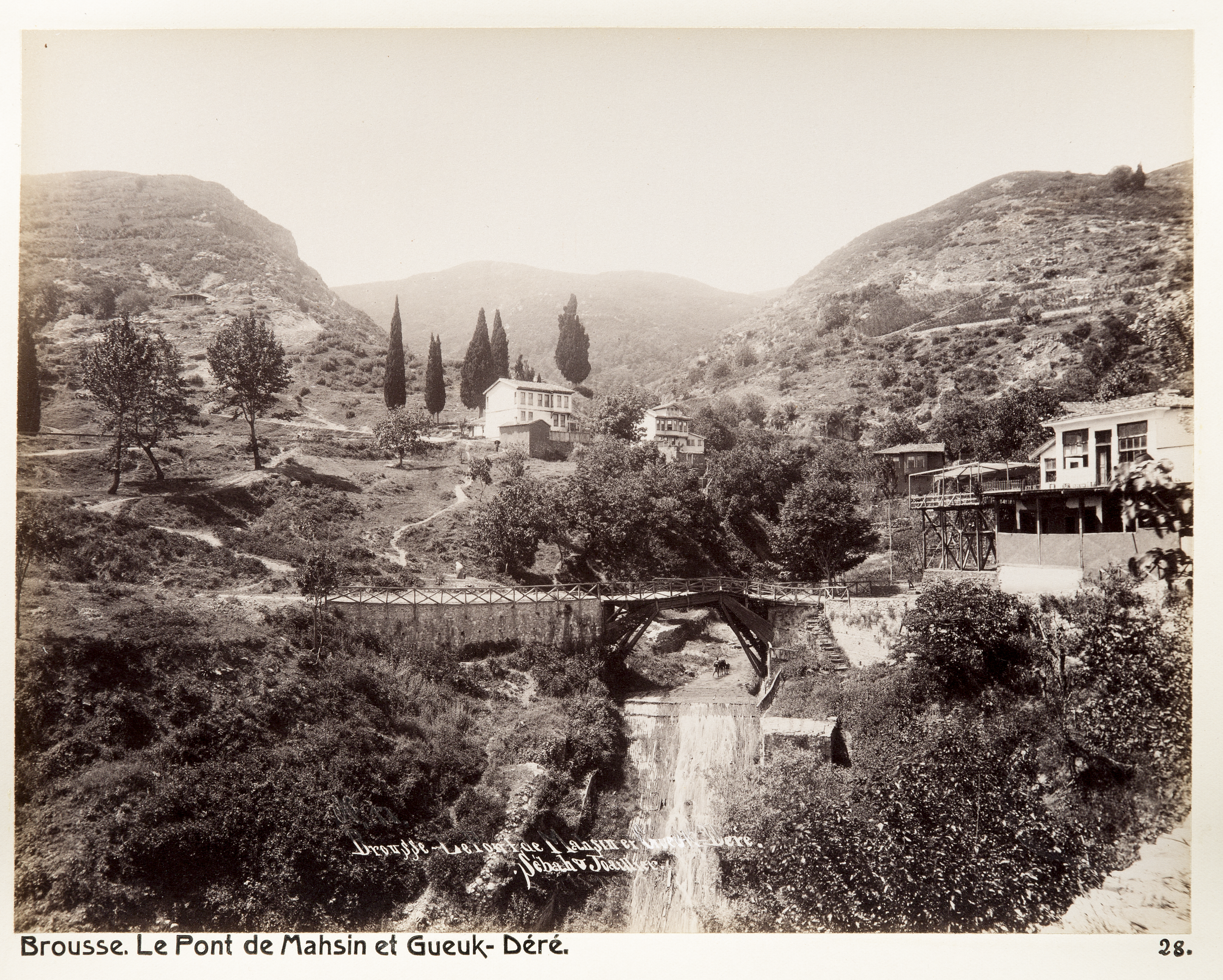
Picture from the von Hallwyl family's journey through Asia Minor and Turkey 27 April - 20 June 1901. Bursa - Hallwyl Museum.

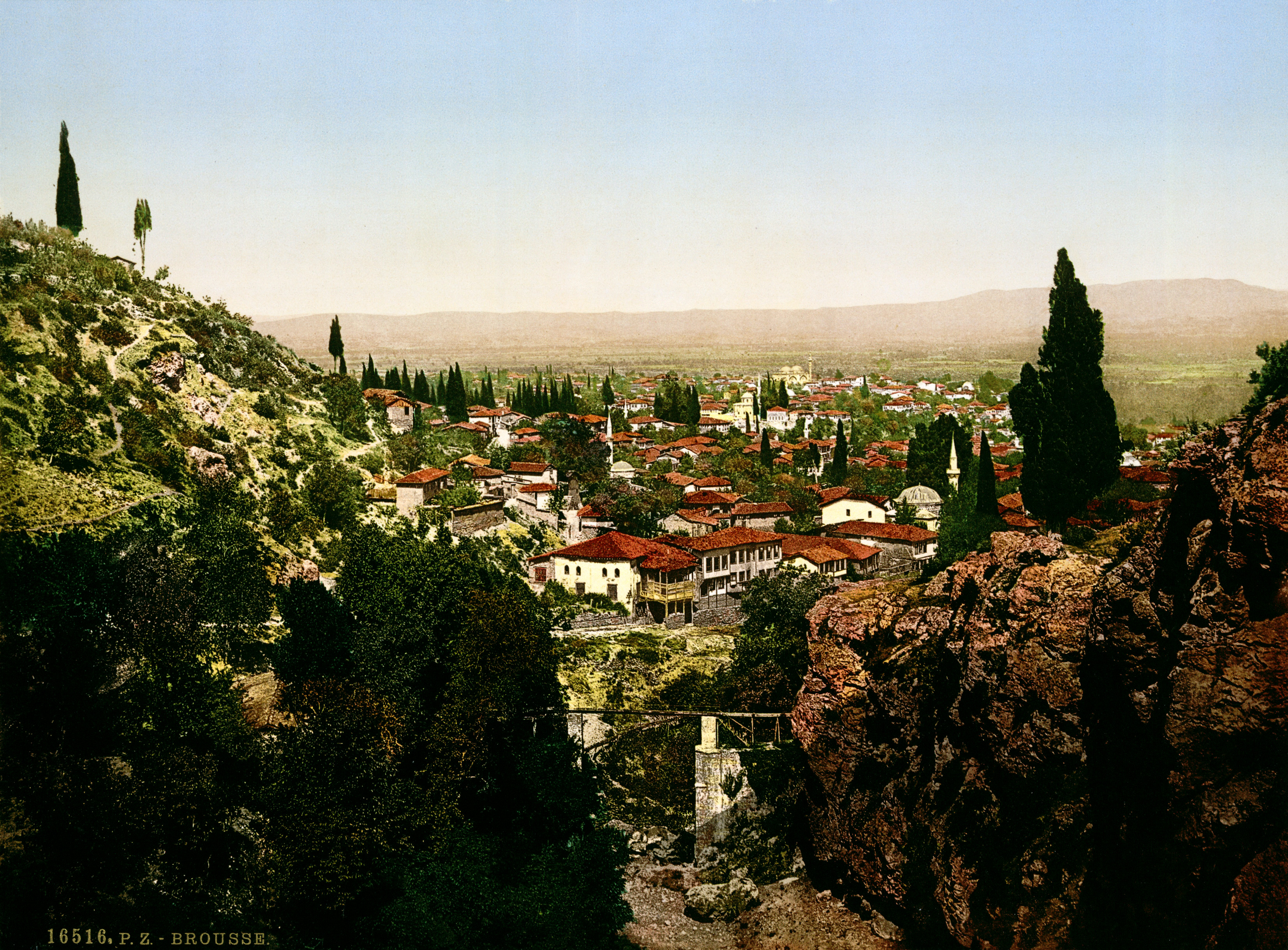
Bursa, Turkey, ca. 1895.

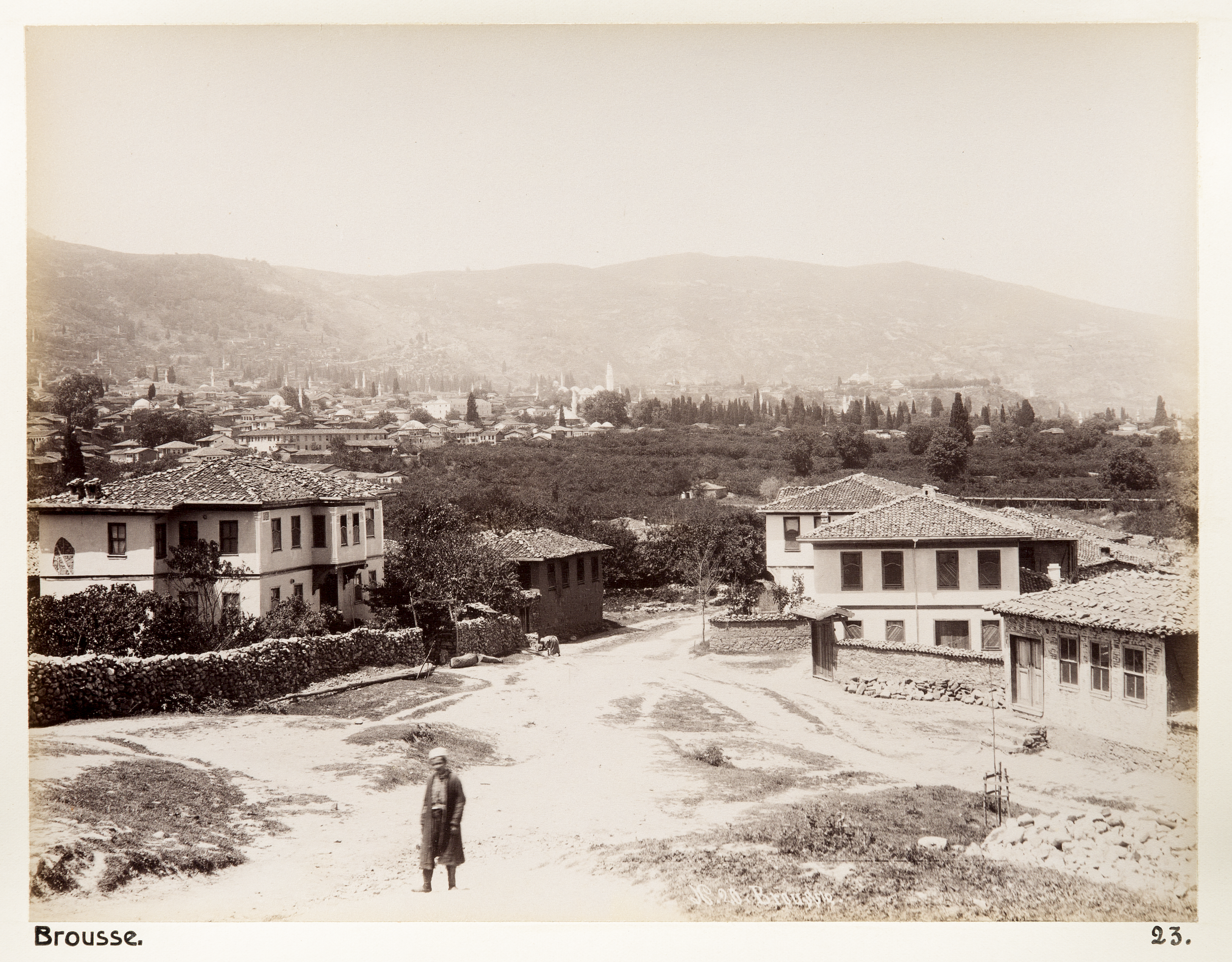
Picture from the von Hallwyl family's journey through Asia Minor and Turkey 27 April - 20 June 1901. Bursa - Hallwyl Museum.

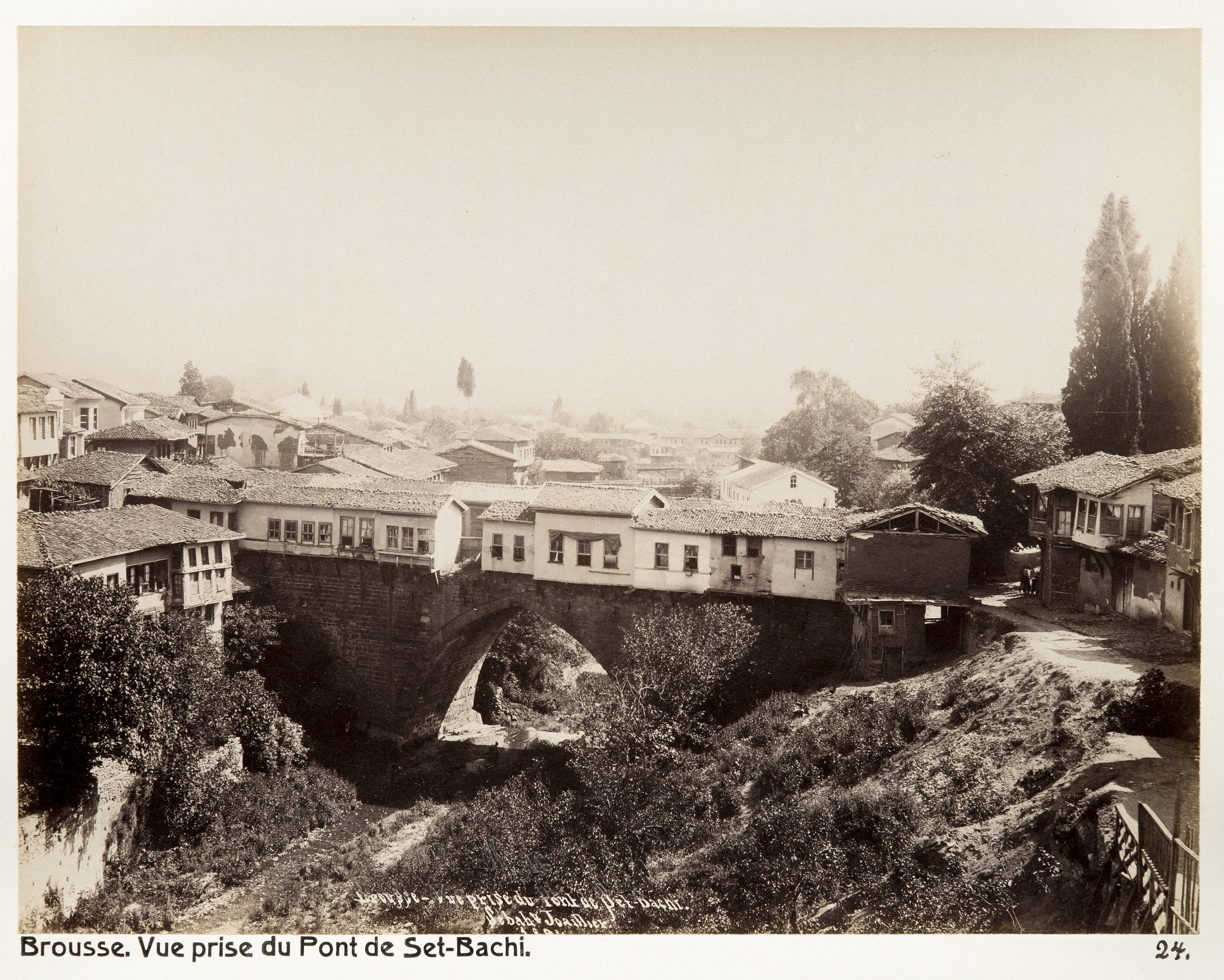
Picture of the Irgandı Bridge from the von Hallwyl family's journey through Asia Minor and Turkey 27 April - 20 June 1901. Bursa - Hallwyl Museum.

Bursa's industry, which was based on foreign-owned silk factories since the 19th century, was accelerated and improved by the production of other industrial sectors, such as textile production, automotive manufacturing, and agriculture-based industries. Public factories and private industrial enterprises are also enstablished in the city later during the Turkish Republic.

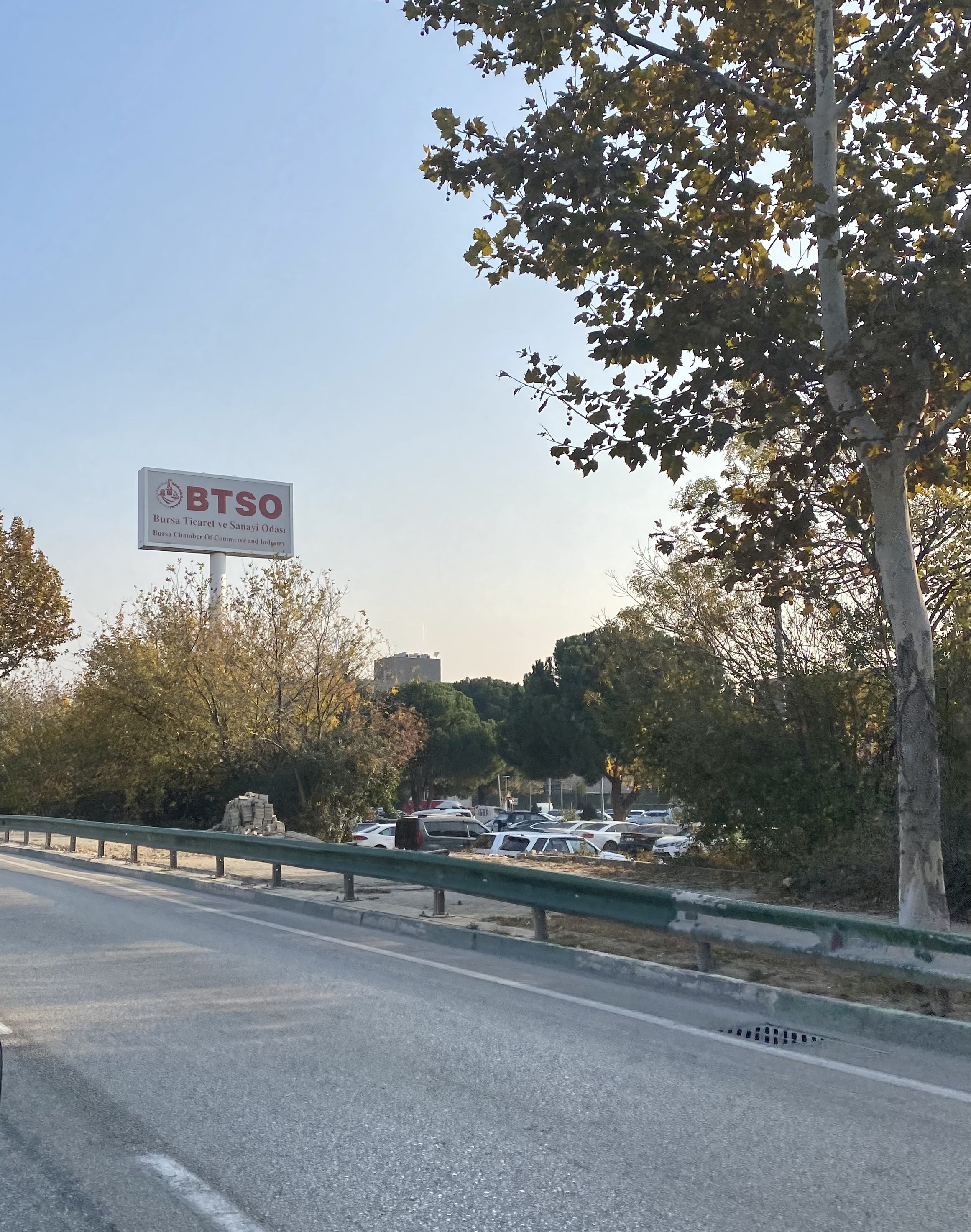
Entrance to the building of the Bursa Chamber of Commerce and Industry (BTSO), a Bursa-based professional association that focuses on commerce and industry since 1889.

Immigrations to Bursa happened as early as 1877, when many of the Ottoman population migrated from Rumelia, Romania, and Bulgaria fleeing the Russo-Turkish War. The immigrants in Bursa later settled in neighborhoods enstablished by the then-serving Vali, Ahmed Vefik Pasha. A major part of the Muslim immigrants of Turkish descent also settled in Bursa after forced migration from Bulgaria in between 1950–51 and also in 1989. Bursa became an immigrant city due to its status as a large city alongside Istanbul, İzmir, and Ankara due to its industries and businesses, which increased employment opportunity. The city was also more preferred to other larger cities by the immigrants from the northeast provinces of Turkey due to perceived similarity of culture, climate, and geography with their home provinces.

During the late Ottoman period, Bursa was home to a substantial Armenian community that played an important role in the city's silk industry. Armenians became increasingly prominent in the silk trade from the seventeenth century, while Armenian entrepreneurs and workers participated in the development of silk manufacturing during the nineteenth century. In 1888, an Armenian co-founded the Bursa Sericulture Institute, which provided formal instruction in silk cultivation; by the beginning of the twentieth century, Armenians and Greeks together accounted for more than 70 percent of the city's silk cultivators. In 1892, Ottoman records listed 7,541 Armenians among Bursa's 76,000 inhabitants. The community also maintained schools and published the Armeno-Turkish newspaper *Khudavendigar*. Deportations of Bursa's Armenians began in 1915, and most of the community subsequently perished or was dispersed.

=== Jewish community ===
Bursa was initially the home to a small Romaniote Jewish community that settled there before the Ottoman conquest in 1326. The Jewish community later underwent a demographic shift with the arrival of Sephardic Jews who arrived in the city after the expulsion from Spain after the Alhambra Decree in 1492, with Judeo-Spanish (Ladino) overtaking the Judeo-Greek as the community's main language.

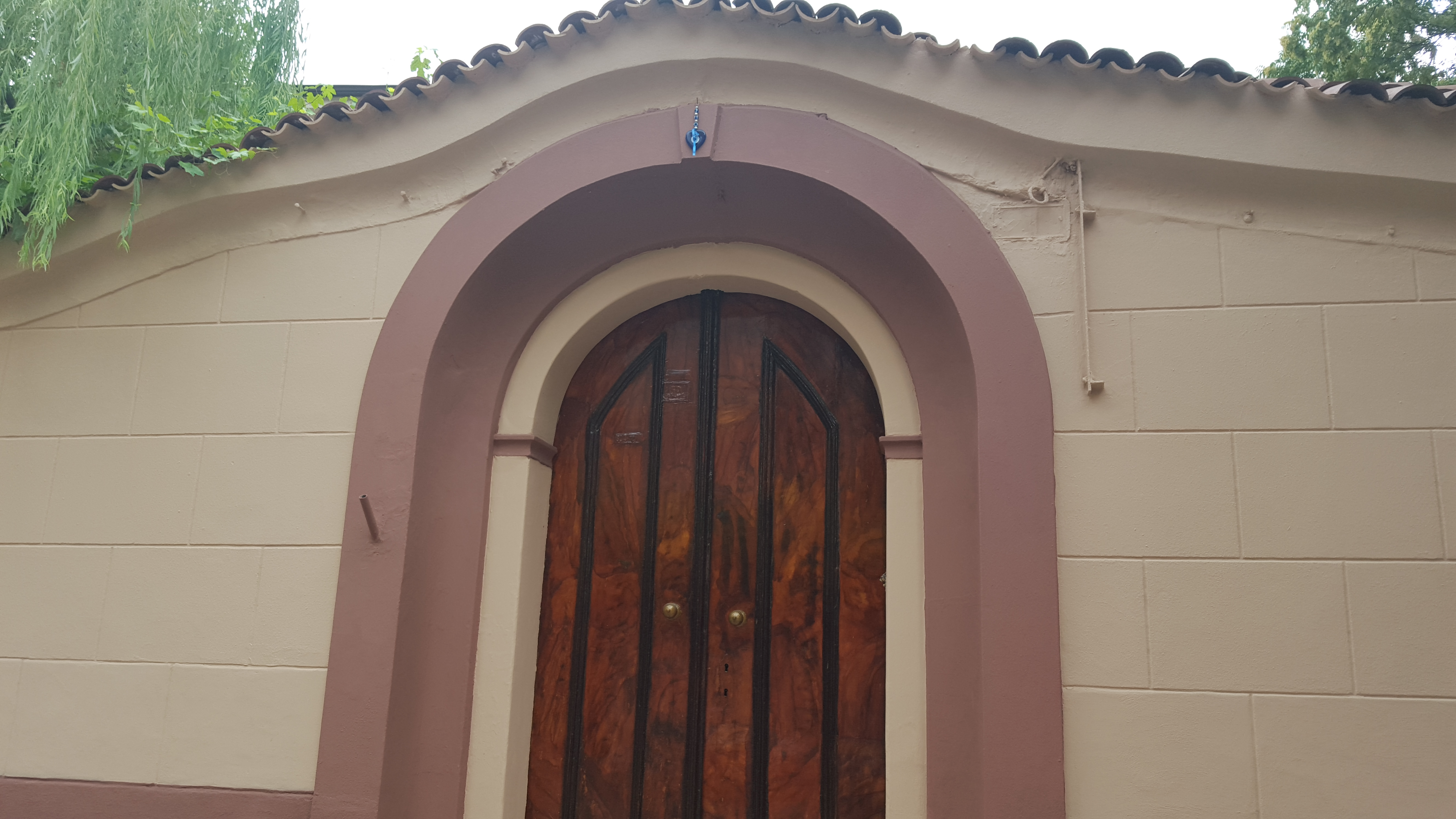
Mayor Synagogue in Bursa

Throughout the Ottoman period, most Jews in Bursa resided in Kuruçeşme, the city's Jewish quarter. Etz Chaim (Eṣ Ḥayyim), the oldest synagogue in Bursa, predated the Ottoman conquest, while the Gerush and Mayor synagogues were established by Sephardic newcomers. Despite the 1851 fire destroying Etz Chaim, the other two remain, along with the Berut synagogue. Bursa also had a Jewish cemetery until recently.

Though never a major center, Bursa's Jewish population fluctuated. Dubious data suggests 683 families in 1571/72, dropping to 141 by 1696/97. By 1883, there were 2,179 Jews, with an influx of 400 from Akkerman in 1887. Pre-World War I, the population reached 3,500, but emigration reduced it to 140 by the early 21st century.

Engaged in the local economy, Bursa's Jews were shop owners and involved in guilds. In the 16th and 17th centuries, they excelled in textile manufacturing, silk trade, goldsmithing, and finance. But the community periodically struggled both economically and with antisemitism; an 1886 report highlighted poverty, and Bursa faced blood libels in 1592 and 1865.

Despite its size, the community produced renowned halakhic scholars across centuries. Modern schooling arrived in 1886 with Alliance Israélite Universelle, but it closed in 1923 during the secularization program. Jewish children then attended Turkish schools for a modern education.

As of 2021, there are 60 Jews left in Bursa, one active synagogue and one Jewish cemetery.

== Geography ==
Köppen map of Bursa Province and surrounding regions:
- BSk
- Csa
- Csb
- Cfa
- Dsb
- Dsc

The area covered by Bursa corresponds to 1.41% of Turkey's land area, which makes the city 27th in the country in terms of land area. Bursa stands on the northwestern slopes of Mount Uludağ (known as the Mysian Olympus in classical antiquity), on the banks of the Nilüfer River, in the southern Marmara Region. It is the capital city of Bursa Province, which borders the Sea of Marmara and Yalova to the north; Kocaeli and Sakarya to the northeast; Bilecik to the east; and Kütahya and Balıkesir to the south.

=== Climate ===
Bursa has a Mediterranean climate (Csa/Cs) under the Köppen and Trewartha classifications. The city has hot, dry summers that last from June until September. Winters are cool and damp, also containing the most rainfall. There can be snow on the ground which will last for a week or two. Air pollution is a chronic problem in Bursa.

Climate data for Bursa (1991–2020, extremes 1928–2023)
Month	Jan	Feb	Mar	Apr	May	Jun	Jul	Aug	Sep	Oct	Nov	Dec	Year
Record high °C (°F)	25.2 (77.4)	26.9 (80.4)	32.5 (90.5)	36.2 (97.2)	37.0 (98.6)	41.3 (106.3)	43.8 (110.8)	42.6 (108.7)	40.3 (104.5)	37.3 (99.1)	32.1 (89.8)	27.3 (81.1)	43.8 (110.8)
Mean daily maximum °C (°F)	9.8 (49.6)	11.4 (52.5)	14.6 (58.3)	19.2 (66.6)	24.4 (75.9)	28.9 (84.0)	31.5 (88.7)	31.7 (89.1)	27.6 (81.7)	22.2 (72.0)	16.6 (61.9)	11.5 (52.7)	20.8 (69.4)
Daily mean °C (°F)	5.4 (41.7)	6.5 (43.7)	9.0 (48.2)	13.0 (55.4)	18.1 (64.6)	22.6 (72.7)	25.1 (77.2)	25.2 (77.4)	20.8 (69.4)	15.9 (60.6)	10.7 (51.3)	7.0 (44.6)	14.9 (58.8)
Mean daily minimum °C (°F)	1.7 (35.1)	2.4 (36.3)	4.1 (39.4)	7.4 (45.3)	12.0 (53.6)	16.2 (61.2)	18.4 (65.1)	18.7 (65.7)	14.8 (58.6)	10.8 (51.4)	6.0 (42.8)	3.3 (37.9)	9.6 (49.3)
Record low °C (°F)	−20.5 (−4.9)	−19.6 (−3.3)	−10.5 (13.1)	−4.2 (24.4)	0.8 (33.4)	4.0 (39.2)	8.3 (46.9)	7.6 (45.7)	3.3 (37.9)	−1.0 (30.2)	−8.4 (16.9)	−17.9 (−0.2)	−20.5 (−4.9)
Average precipitation mm (inches)	79.2 (3.12)	78.2 (3.08)	74.9 (2.95)	68.6 (2.70)	47.9 (1.89)	42.8 (1.69)	14.3 (0.56)	17.5 (0.69)	50.1 (1.97)	84.4 (3.32)	67.3 (2.65)	93.9 (3.70)	719.1 (28.31)
Average precipitation days	14.87	13.60	13.40	11.43	9.63	7.30	3.33	3.60	6.77	10.67	10.93	14.53	119.8
Average snowy days	5.08	3.71	1.46	0.08	0	0	0	0	0	0.04	0.42	2.42	13.21
Average relative humidity (%)	75.3	72.8	70.7	69.3	67.1	63.1	59.6	61.7	67.3	74.6	75.5	75.7	69.4
Mean monthly sunshine hours	81.3	82.3	122.2	158.1	210.2	262.9	300.5	274.7	209.8	144.7	109.9	72.9	2,026.8
Mean daily sunshine hours	2.7	3.2	4.0	5.5	7.0	8.8	9.7	8.9	7.0	4.7	3.7	2.5	5.6
Source 1: Turkish State Meteorological Service
Source 2: NOAA (humidity, sun 1991–2020), Meteomanz

== Demographics ==
Population

Historical population

Year	Pop.	±%
2009	1,624,031	—
2013	1,769,752	+9.0%

Year	Pop.	±%
2017	1,899,479	+7.3%
2022	2,051,464	+8.0%

Source: "Bursa (City) – Population Statistics". City Population.

Bursa's population increased from 1,899,479 in 2017 to 2,051,464 in 2022, representing an increase of approximately 8% over five years.

== Economy ==
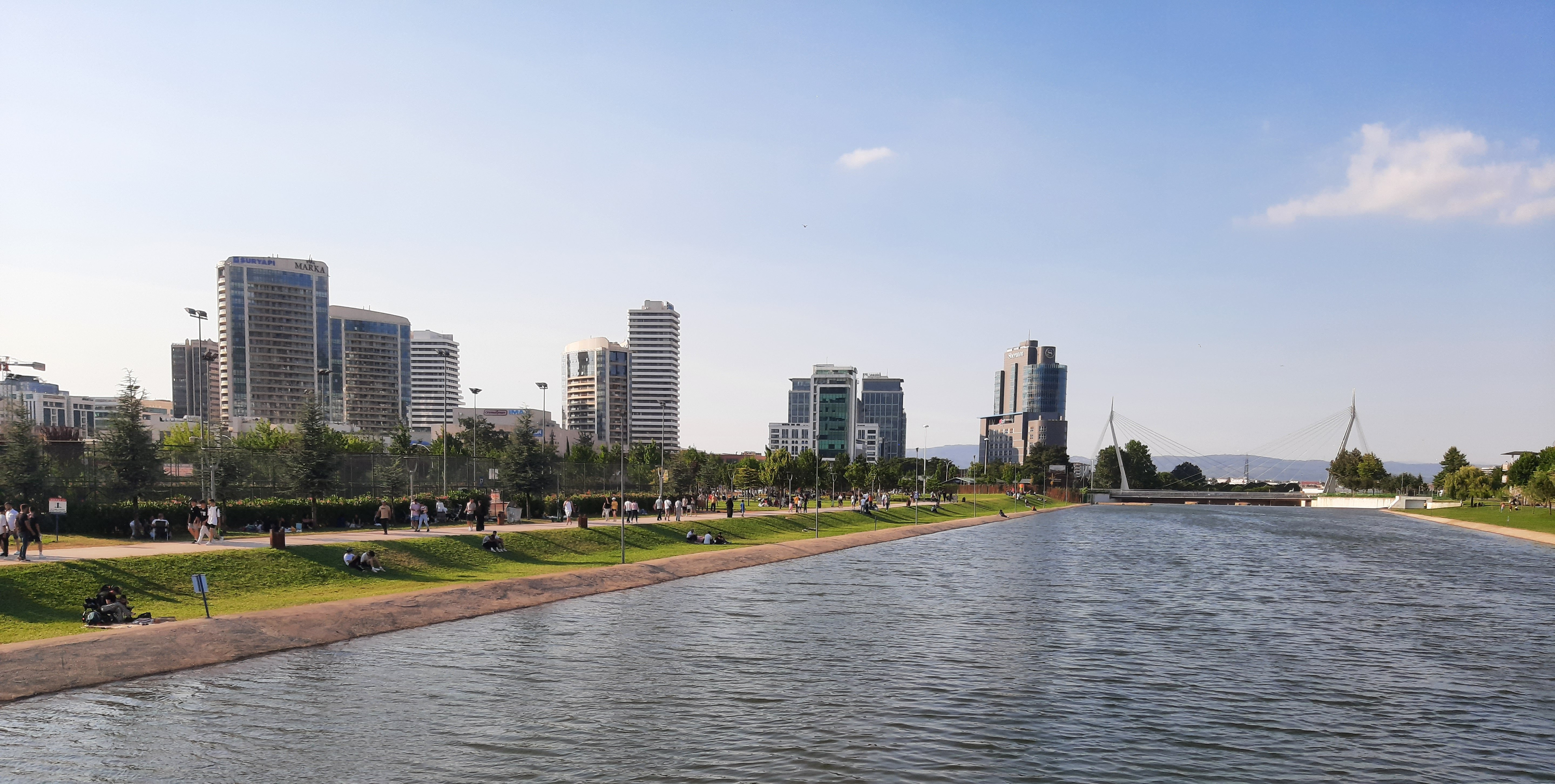
Bursa is one of the leading industrial and agricultural production centres in Turkey.

Bursa is the largest production centre of the Turkish automotive industry. Factories of motor vehicle producers like Fiat, Renault and Karsan, as well as automotive parts producers like Bosch, Mako, Valeo, Johnson Controls, Delphi have been active in the city for decades. The textile and food industries are equally strong, with Coca-Cola, Pepsi Cola and other beverage brands, as well as fresh and canned food industries being present in the city's organized industrial zones.

Apart from its large automotive industry, Bursa also produces a substantial amount of dairy products (by Sütaş), processed food (by Tat), and beverages (by Uludağ).

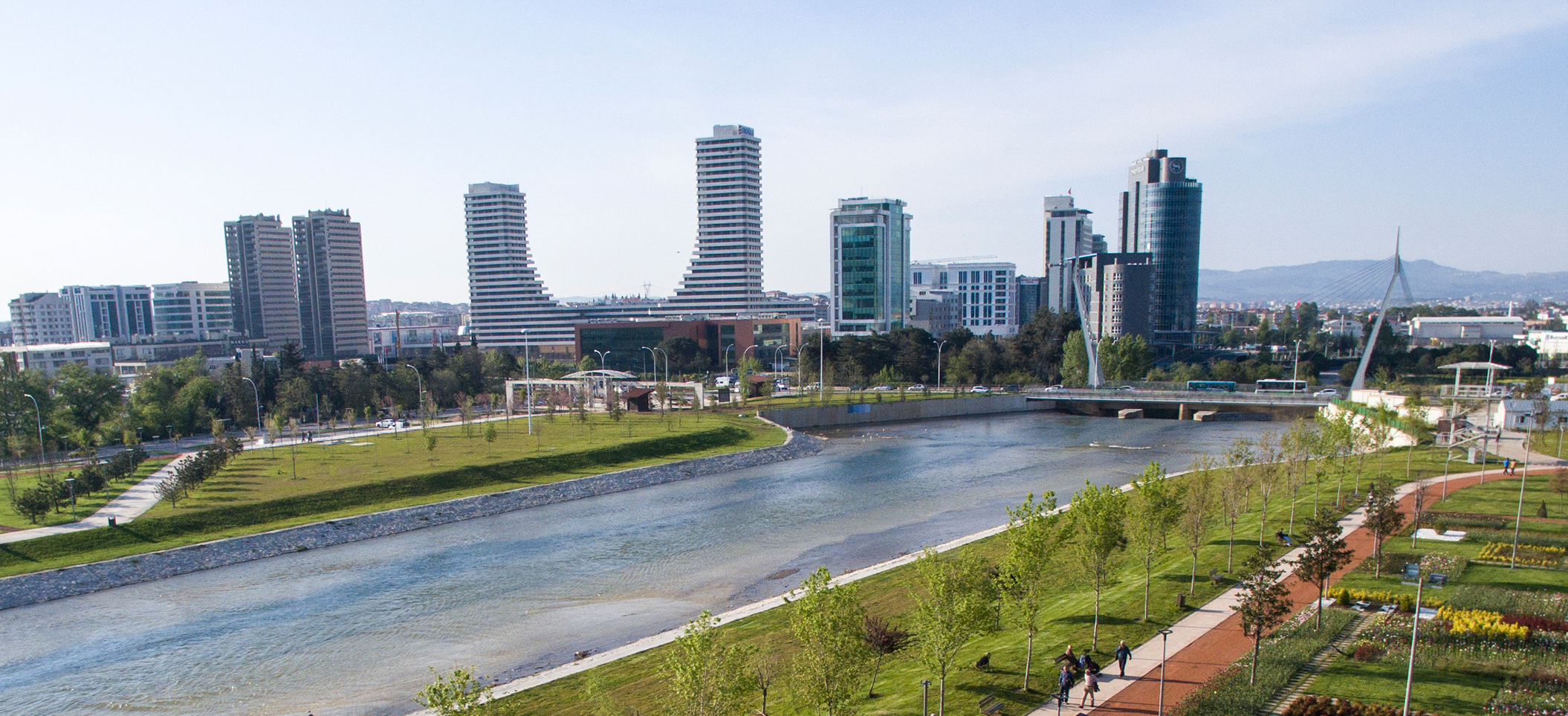
Nilüfer River and Hüdavendigar Park

Traditionally, Bursa was famous for being the largest centre of silk trade in the Byzantine and later the Ottoman empires, during the period of the lucrative Silk Road. The city is still a major centre for textiles in Turkey and is home to the Bursa International Textiles and Trade Centre (Bursa Uluslararası Tekstil ve Ticaret Merkezi, or BUTTIM). Bursa was also known for its fertile soil and agricultural activities, which have decreased in the recent decades due to the heavy industrialization of the city.

Bursa is a major centre for tourism. One of the most popular skiing resorts in Turkey is located on Mount Uludağ, just next to the city proper. Bursa's thermal baths have been used for therapeutical purposes since Roman times. Apart from the baths that are operated by hotels, Uludağ University has a physical therapy centre which also makes use of thermal water.

== Transportation ==
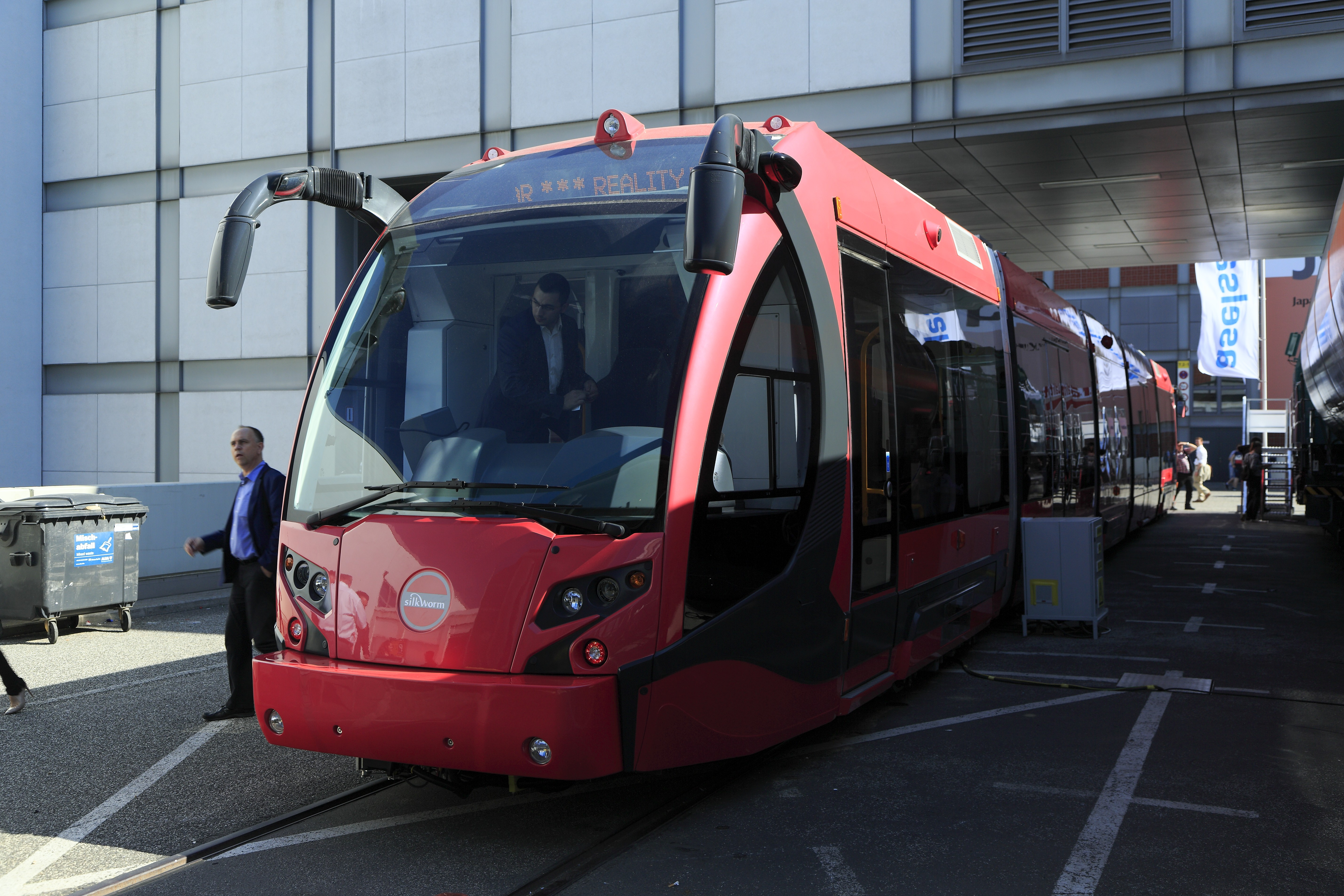
Tram type "Silkworm" is produced in Bursa by Turkish manufacturer Durmazlar.

Bursa has a metro (Bursaray), trams and a bus system for inner-city public transport, while taxi cabs are also available. Bursa's Yenişehir Airport is 49 km (30 mi) away from the city centre. The citizens of Bursa also prefer Istanbul's airports such as Istanbul Airport and Sabiha Gökçen International Airport for flights to foreign countries, due to Istanbul's proximity to Bursa. There are numerous daily bus and ferry services between the two cities.

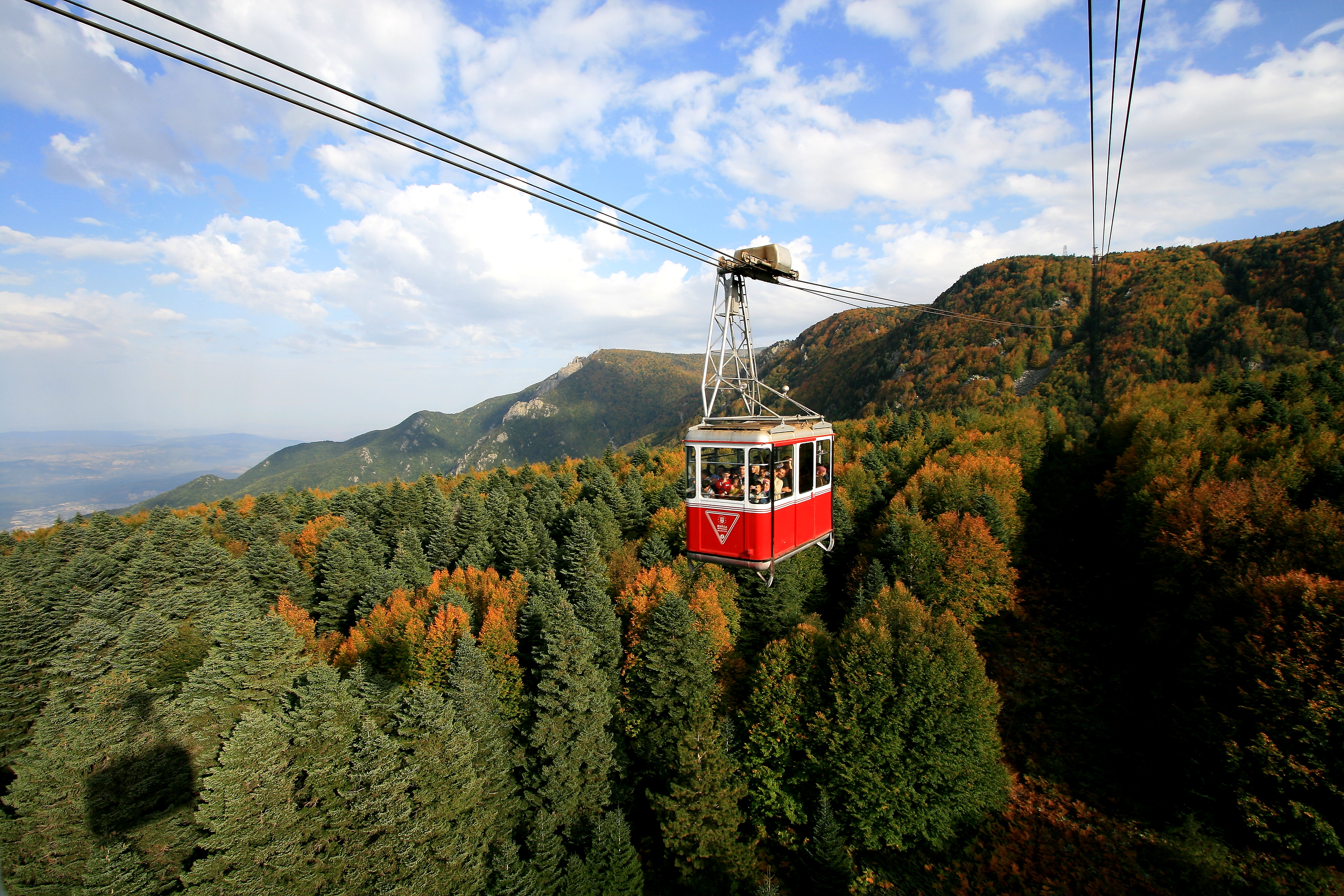
Bursa – Mt. Uludağ gondola lift

The 8.8 km (5.5 mi) long Bursa Uludağ Gondola (Turkish: Teleferik) connects Bursa with the ski resort areas 1,870 m (6,140 ft) high on the mountain Uludağ.

The only railway station in Bursa is the Harmancık station on the Balıkesir-Kütahya railway, which was opened in 1930.

The average amount of time people spend commuting with public transit in Bursa, for example to and from work, on a weekday is 62 min. 12% of public transit riders ride for more than 2 hours every day. The average amount of time people wait at a stop or station for public transit is 18 min, while 31% of riders wait for over 20 minutes on average every day. The average distance people usually ride in a single trip on public transit is 8.1 km (5.0 mi), while 17% travel for over 12 km (7.5 mi) in a single direction.

== Education ==
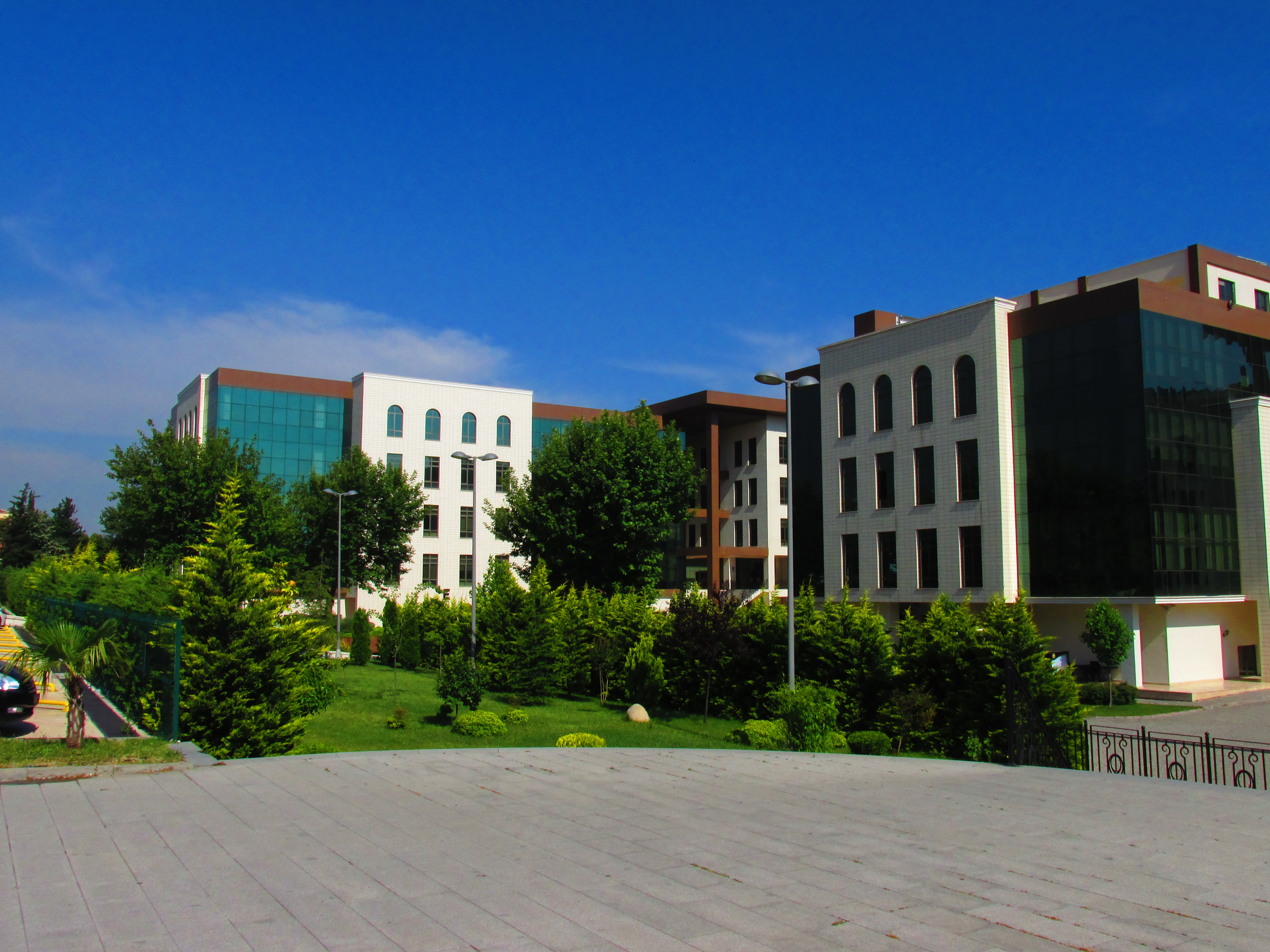
Bursa Technical University campus

Bursa has two public universities and one private university. Uludağ University, founded in 1975, is the oldest institution of higher education in the city. Founded first as the Bursa University then renamed Uludağ University in 1982, the university has a student body of 47,000, one of the largest in Turkey. Bursa Technical University is the second public university of Bursa and was established in 2010, beginning education in the 2011–2012 academic year.

The first private university in Bursa was the Bursa Orhangazi University, which started education in the 2012–2013 academic year. However, Orhangazi University was shut down by the Turkish government after the failed coup attempt of July 2016.

Istanbul Commerce University has opened graduate programs in Bursa in 2013.

The vocational high schools, Bursa Sports High School, and Bursa Agriculture Vocational High School, are located in Osmangazi district.

== Sports ==
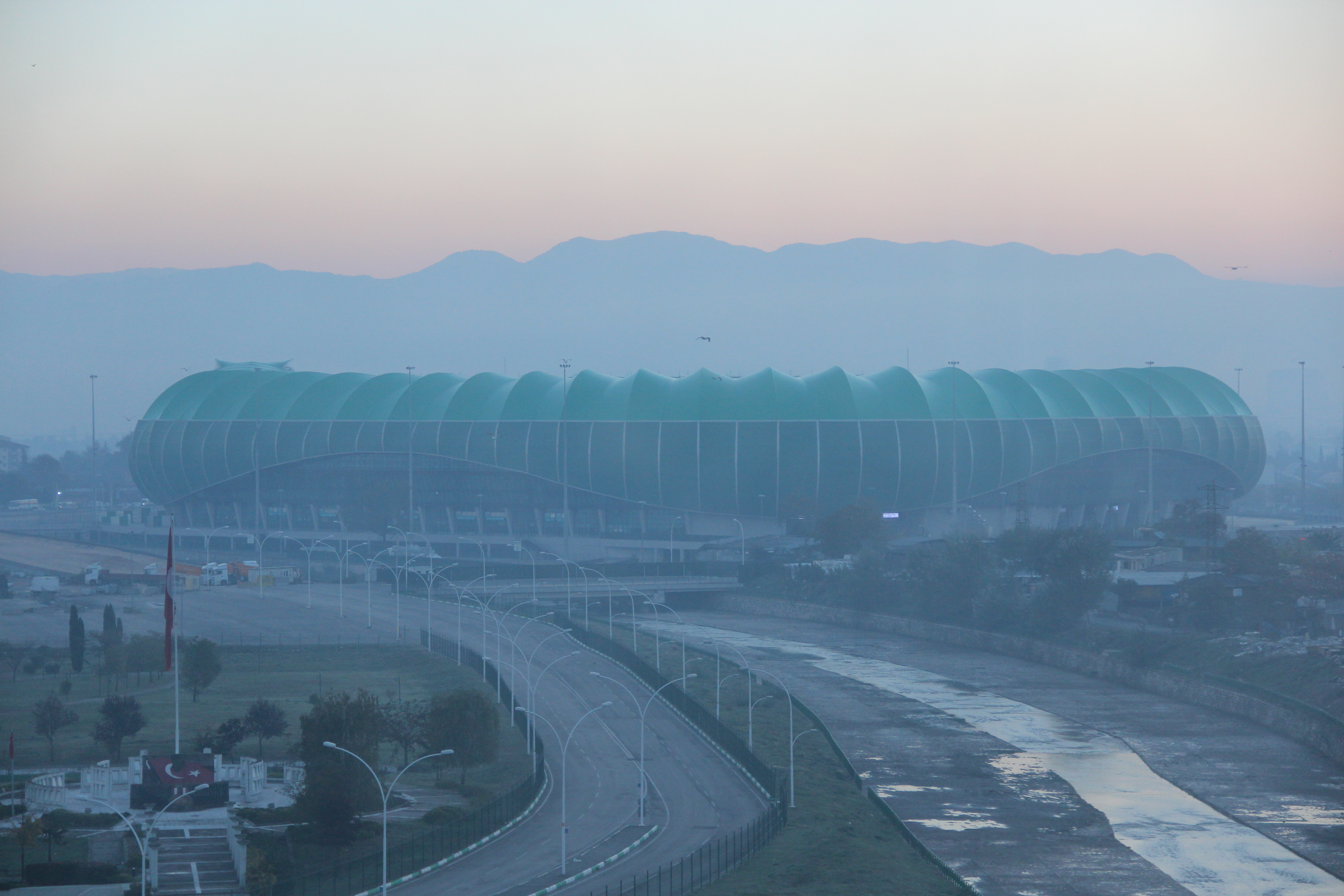
Timsah Arena is the home of Bursaspor, which won the Süper Lig (Super League) championship title at the end of the 2009–10 season.

The city has one professional football club, Bursaspor, which formerly competed in the Süper Lig (Super League), the top-tier of Turkish football, until finishing 16th at the end of the 2018–19 Süper Lig season and being relegated to the TFF First League. A few years earlier, Bursaspor had managed to become the Turkish champions at the end of the 2009–10 Süper Lig season, thereby becoming the second Anatolian club to ever win the Süper Lig championship title after Trabzonspor. Henceforth, Bursaspor was often considered to be one of the five biggest football clubs in Turkey, along with Galatasaray, Fenerbahçe, Beşiktaş and Trabzonspor. The club's relegation to the TFF First League at the end of the 2018–19 season was a major shock for its fans and became a first in the history of Turkish football. Never had a club which had won the Süper Lig championship title been relegated.

Bursaspor plays its home games at the Timsah Arena (meaning "Crocodile Arena", crocodile being the mascot of the team), which has a seating capacity of 45,000.

The city has three professional basketball teams in the Turkish Basketball League, Bursaspor and Tofaş S.K., which is among the most successful teams. The club plays its games at the Tofaş Nilüfer Sports Hall. Also, Final Spor plays in the second division.

== Politics ==
Bursa district Municipalities Local elections, 2024
- AKP: 9 / 17
- CHP: 6 / 17
- IYIP: 2 / 17

The current mayor of the Bursa Metropolitan Municipality, Mustafa Bozbey, is elected from the main opposition party, Republican People's Party (CHP), in March 2024.

Alinur Aktaş from the Justice and Development Party (AKP) was in office between 2019 and 2024, when the AKP coalition won 49.6% of the vote against the CHP coalition which got 47% of the vote.

== Culture and tourism ==
=== Ulu Cami (Grand Mosque) ===
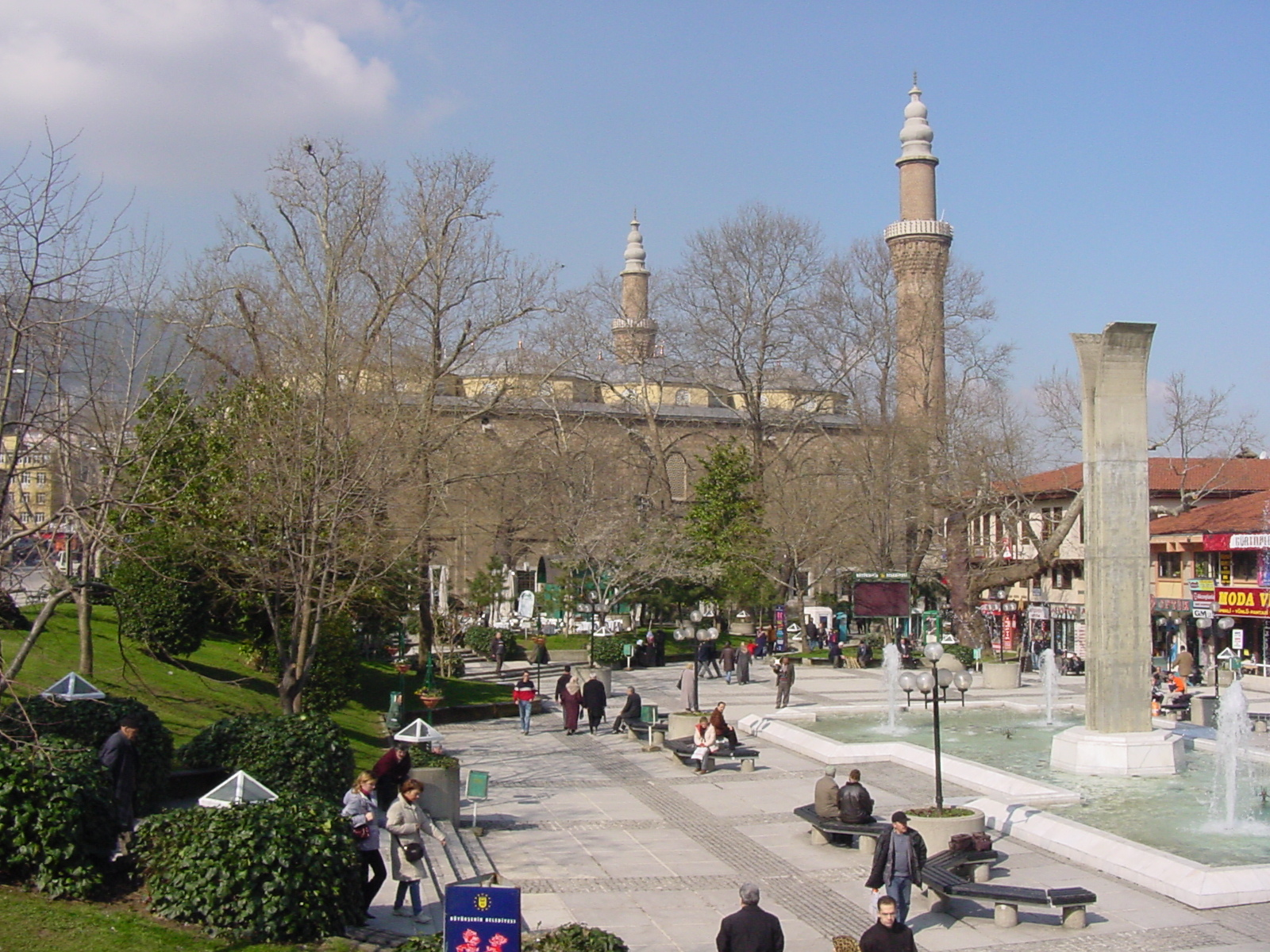
The Grand Mosque and Orhan Gazi Square in Bursa

Ulu Cami is the largest mosque in Bursa and a landmark of early Ottoman architecture, which incorporated many elements from Seljuk architecture.

Ordered by Sultan Bayezid I, the mosque was designed and built by architect Ali Neccar in 1396–1400. It is a large and rectangular building, with a total of twenty domes that are arranged in four rows of five, and are supported by 12 columns. Supposedly the twenty domes were built instead of the twenty separate mosques which Sultan Bayezid I had promised for winning the Battle of Nicopolis in 1396. The mosque has two minarets.

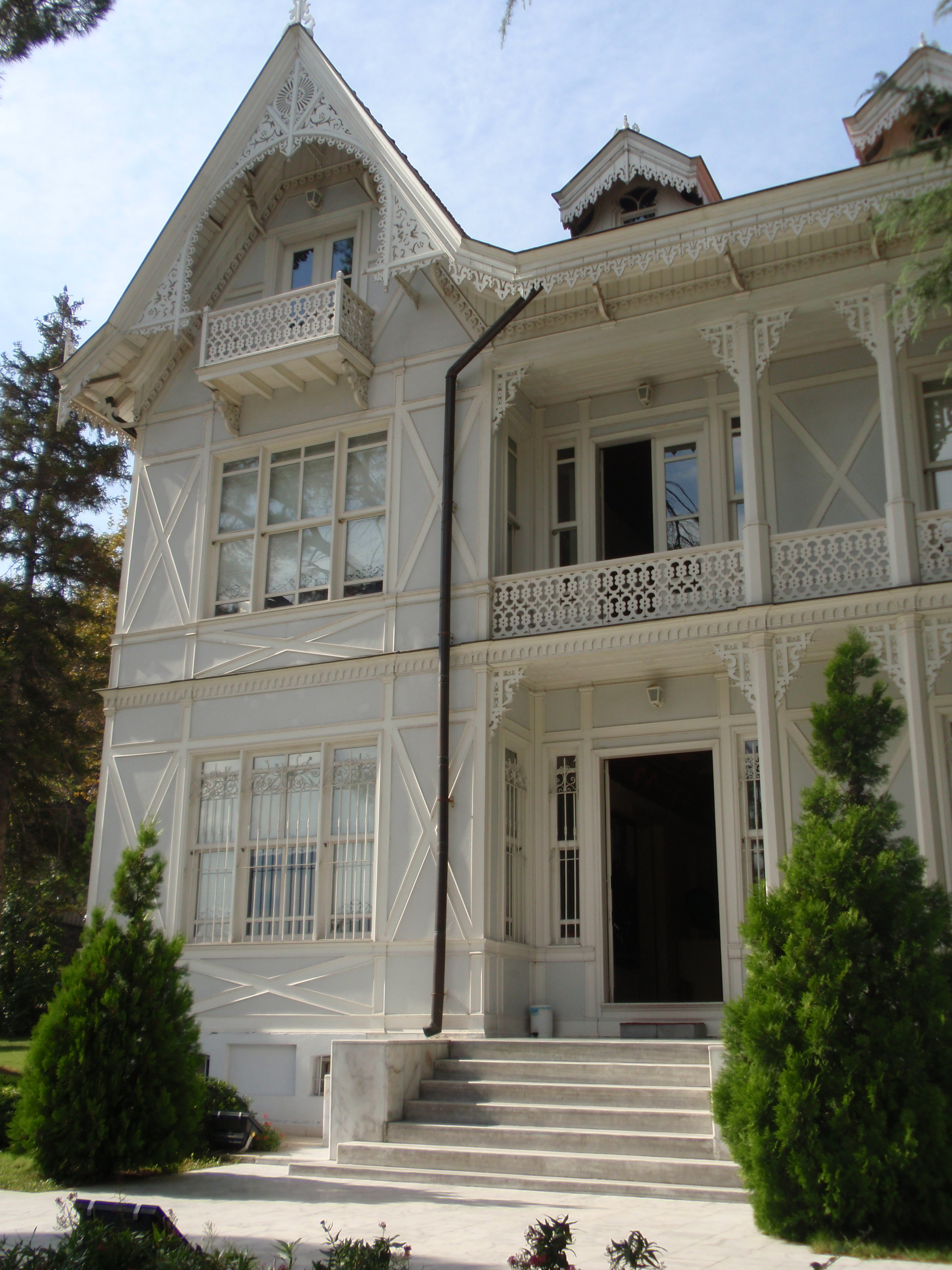
Bursa Atatürk Museum

Inside the mosque, there are 192 monumental wall inscriptions written by the famous calligraphers of that period. There is also a fountain (şadırvan) where worshipers can perform ritual ablutions before prayer; the dome over the şadırvan is capped by a skylight which creates a soft, serene light below; thus playing an important role in the illumination of the large building.

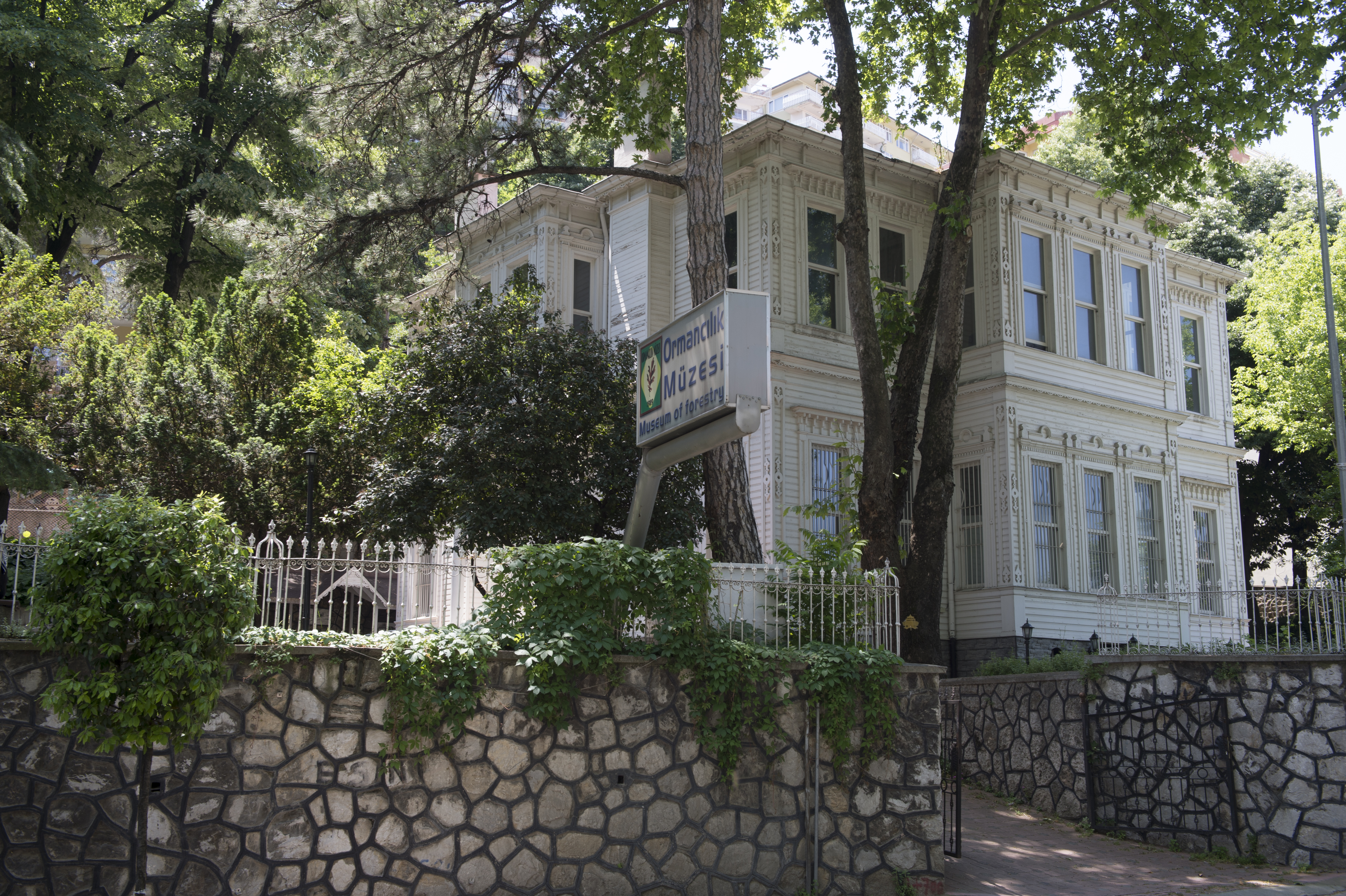
The Bursa Forestry Museum

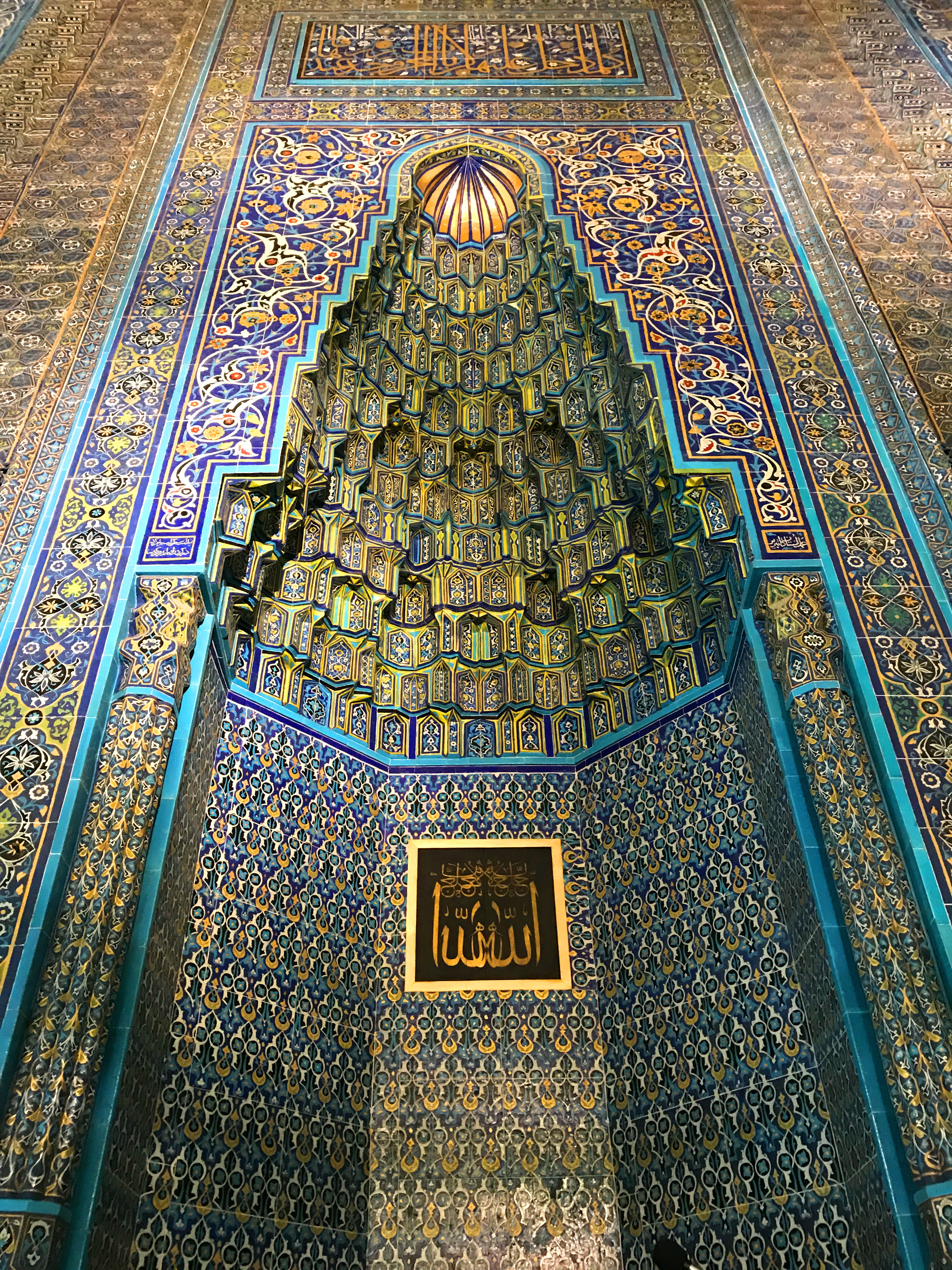
Yeşil Mosque

The horizontally spacious and dimly lit interior is designed to feel peaceful and contemplative. The subdivisions of space formed by multiple domes and pillars create a sense of privacy and even intimacy. This atmosphere contrasts with the later Ottoman mosques (see for example the works of Suleiman the Magnificent's chief architect, Mimar Sinan.) The mosques that were built after the conquest of Constantinople (Istanbul) by the Ottoman Turks in 1453, and influenced by the design of the 6th century Byzantine basilica of Hagia Sophia, had increasingly elevated and large central domes, which create a vertical emphasis that is intended to be more overwhelming; to convey the divine power of Allah, the majesty of the Ottoman Sultan, and the governmental authority of the Ottoman State.

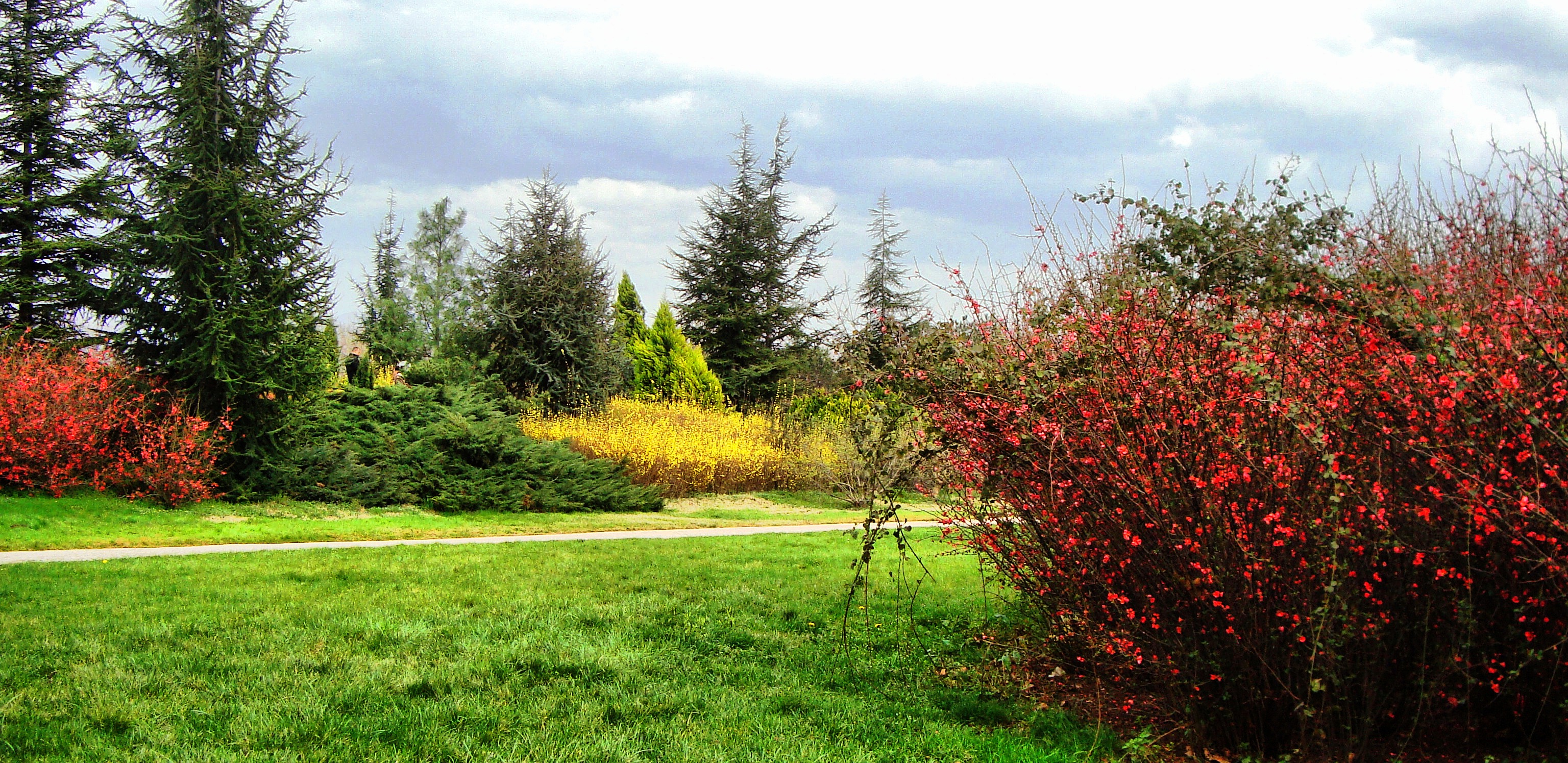
Botanical Park of Bursa

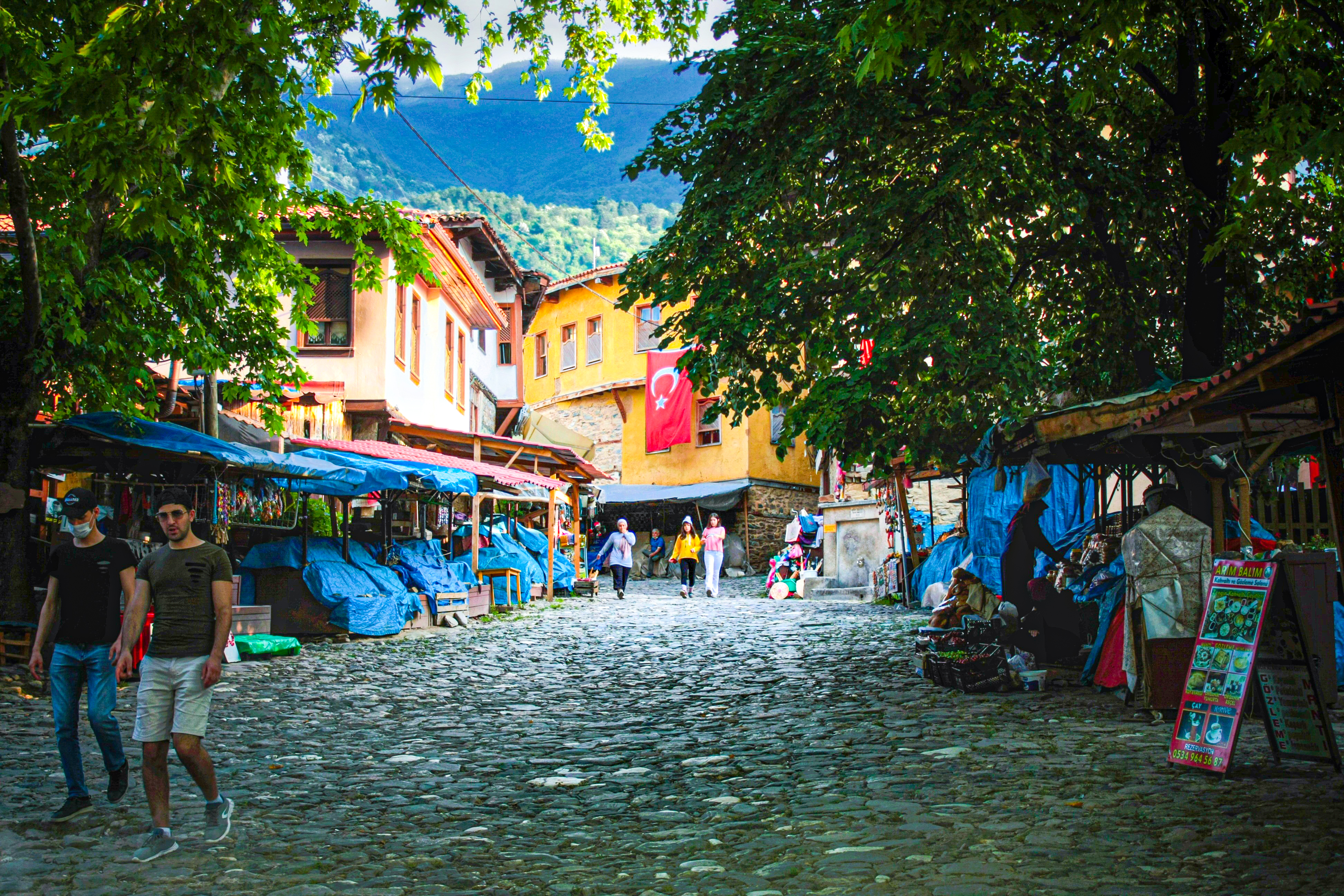
The village of Cumalıkızık, near Bursa, is a UNESCO World Heritage Site with Ottoman era historic houses.

=== Mosques and külliye complexes ===
- Bursa Grand Mosque and külliye
- Yeşil Mosque and külliye
- Bayezid I Mosque and külliye
- Muradiye Mosque and külliye
- Emir Sultan Mosque and külliye
- Orhan Gazi Mosque and külliye
- Hüdavendigar Mosque and külliye
- Koca Sinan Paşa Mosque and külliye
- İshak Paşa Mosque and külliye
- Karacabey Grand Mosque
- Karabaş-i Veli Cultural Centre
- Somuncu Baba Mosque
- Üftade Tekkesi Mosque and complex
- Babasultan Mosque and complex

=== Bazaars and caravanserais ===
- Yıldırım Bazaar (bedesten)
- Koza Han
- Pirinç Han
- İpek Han

=== Other historic monuments ===
- Bursa Castle
- Irgandı Bridge
- İnkaya Sycamore, a massive and impressive 600-year-old tree (Platanus orientalis)

=== Museums ===
- Bursa Archaeological Museum
- Bursa Atatürk Museum,
- Bursa City Museum,
- Bursa Energy Museum
- Bursa Forestry Museum
- Bursa Karagöz Museum
- Bursa Museum of Turkish and Islamic Art
- Bursa Turkish Architecture Museum
- İznik Museum
- Mudanya Armistice House
- Museum of Ottoman House
- Tofaş Museum of Cars and Anatolian Carriages

=== Parks and gardens ===
- Uludağ National Park
- Bursa Zoo and Botanical Garden
- Bursa Hüdavendigar Kent Park

=== Hot springs and thermal baths ===
- Keramet hot spring
- Çekirge hot spring
- Armutlu hot spring
- Oylat hot spring
- Gemlik hot spring
- Çelik Palas thermal bath

=== Gallery ===
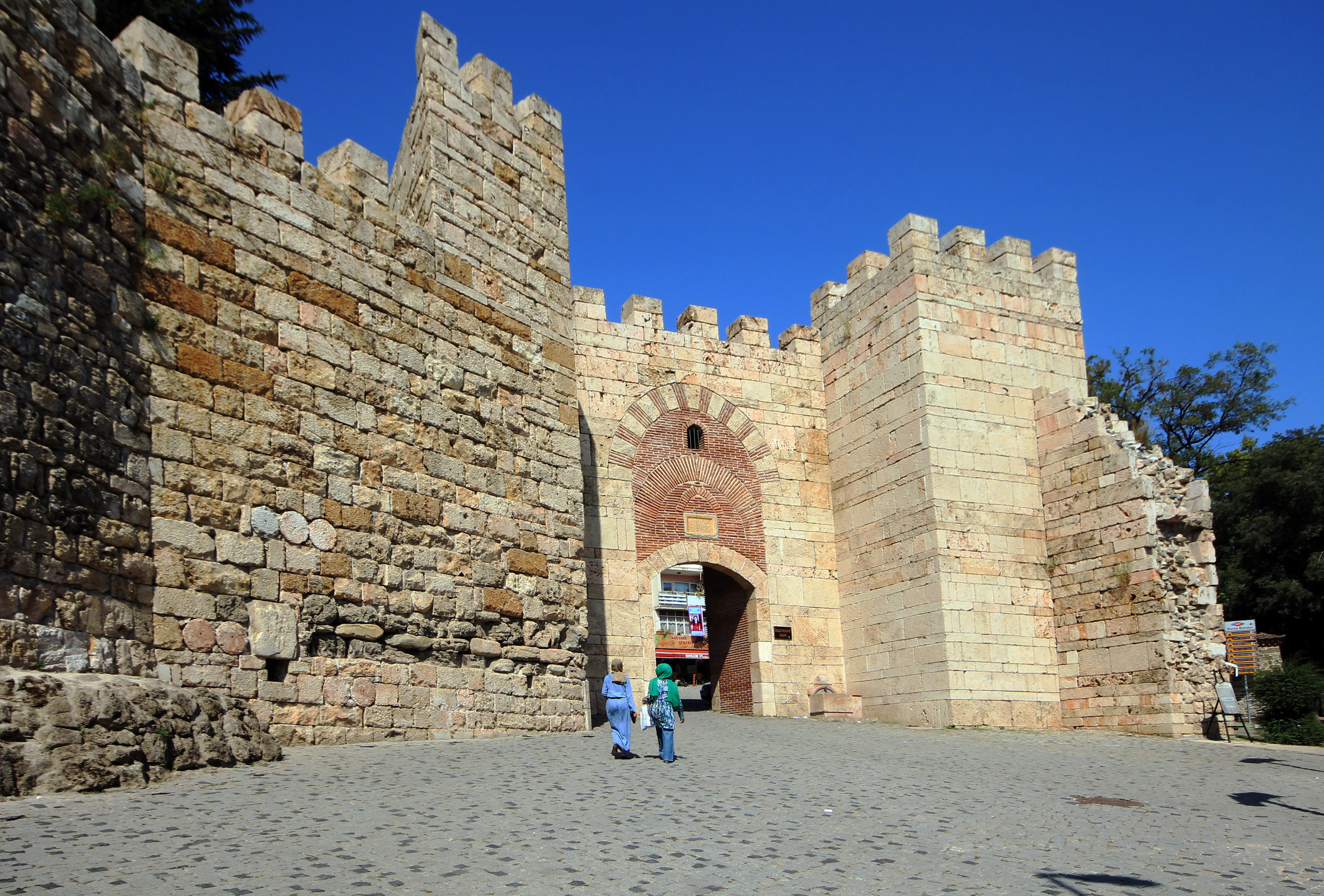
Bursa Citadel Main Gate

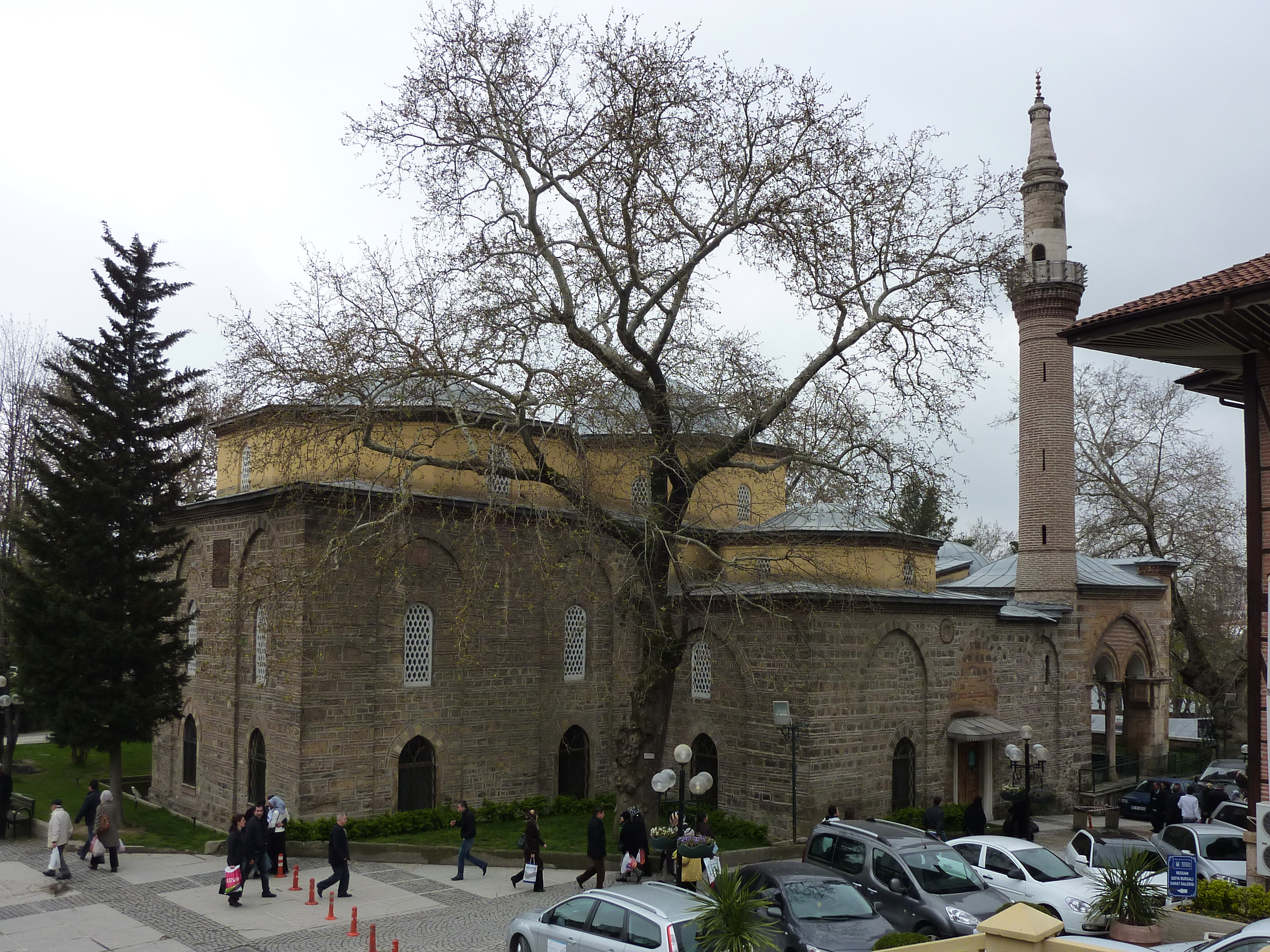
Orhan Gazi Mosque

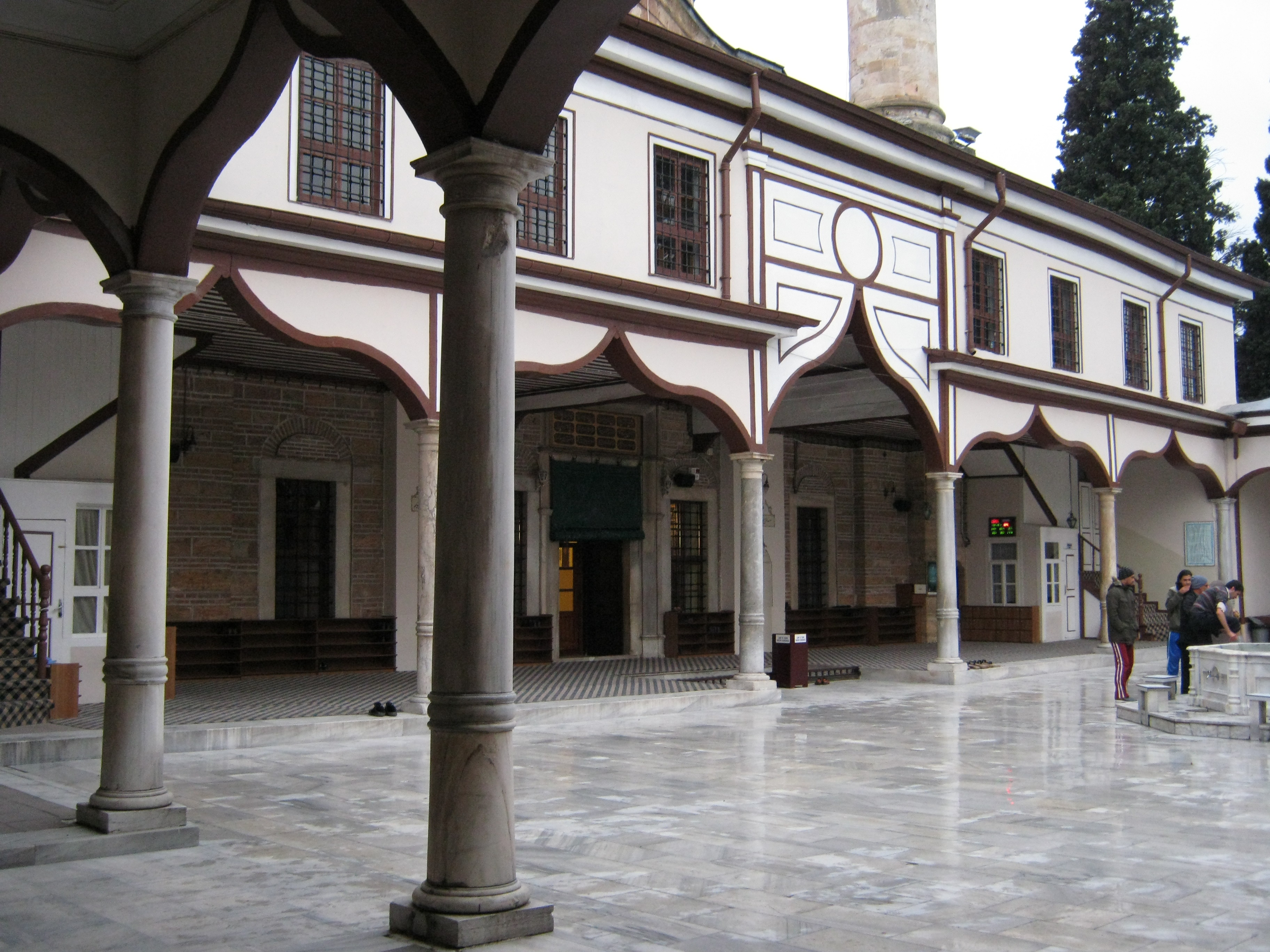
Emir Sultan Mosque

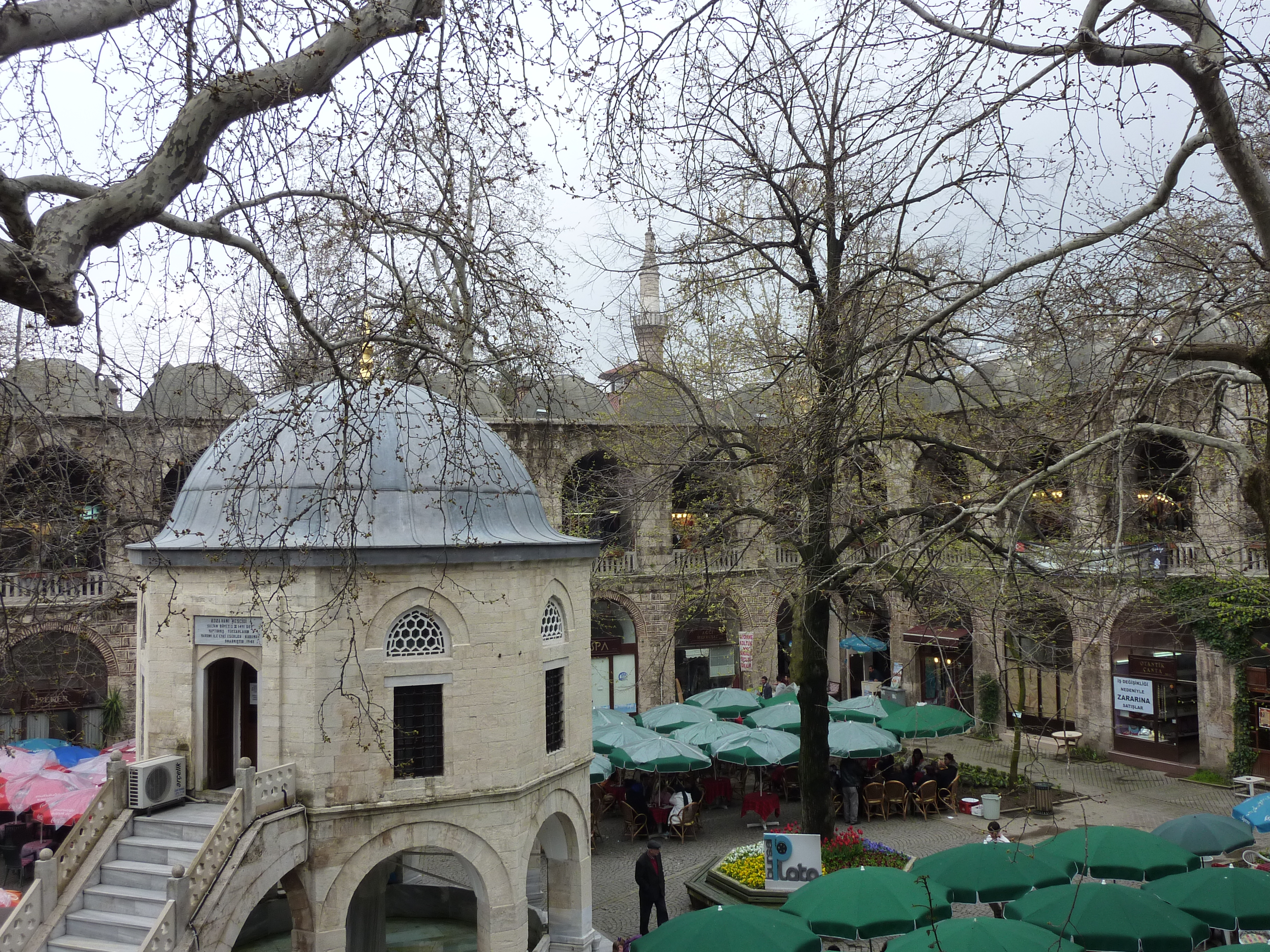
Koza Han (Silk Bazaar) in Bursa

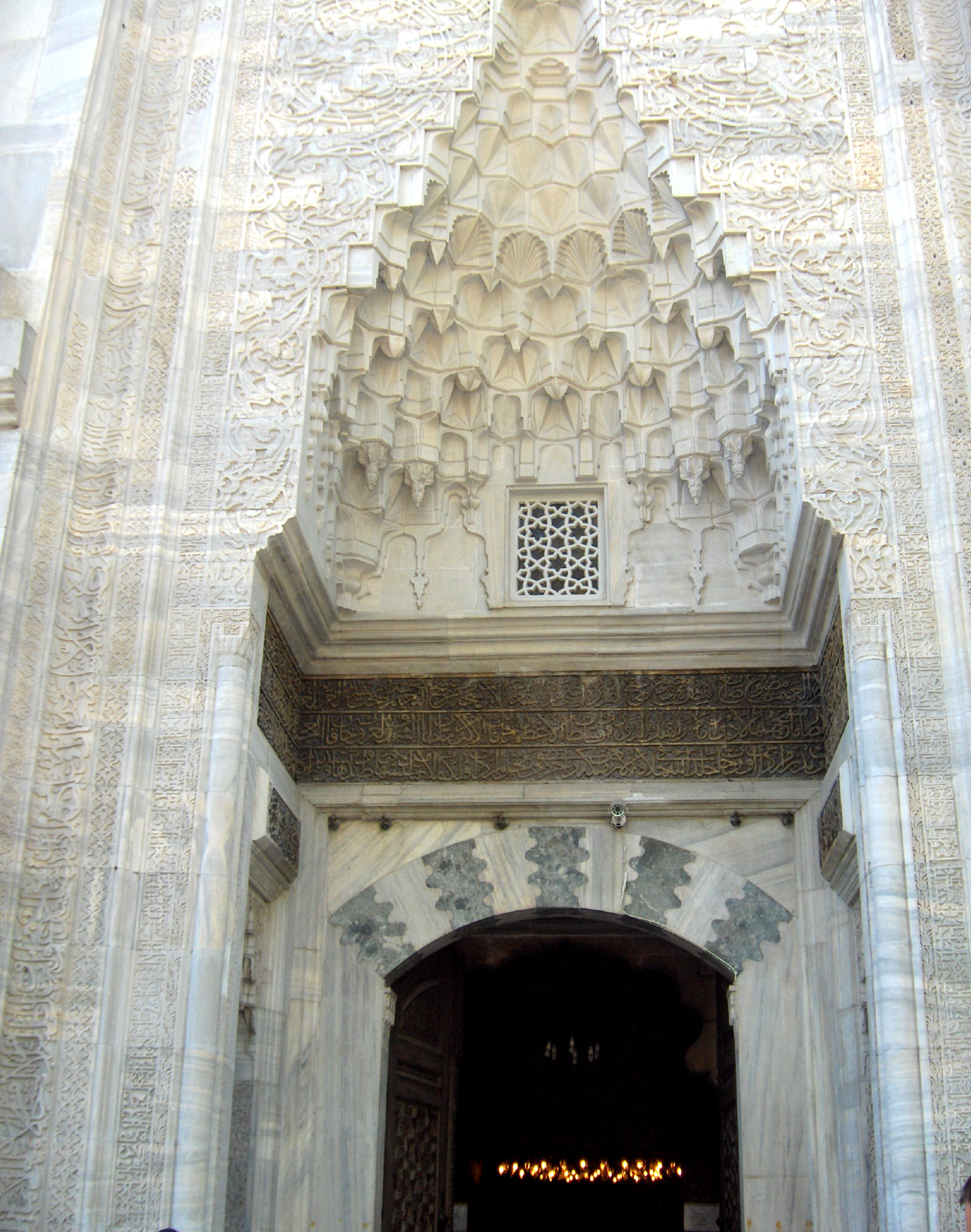
Entrance of the Yeşil Cami (Green Mosque)

Muradiye Mosque and Külliye in Bursa

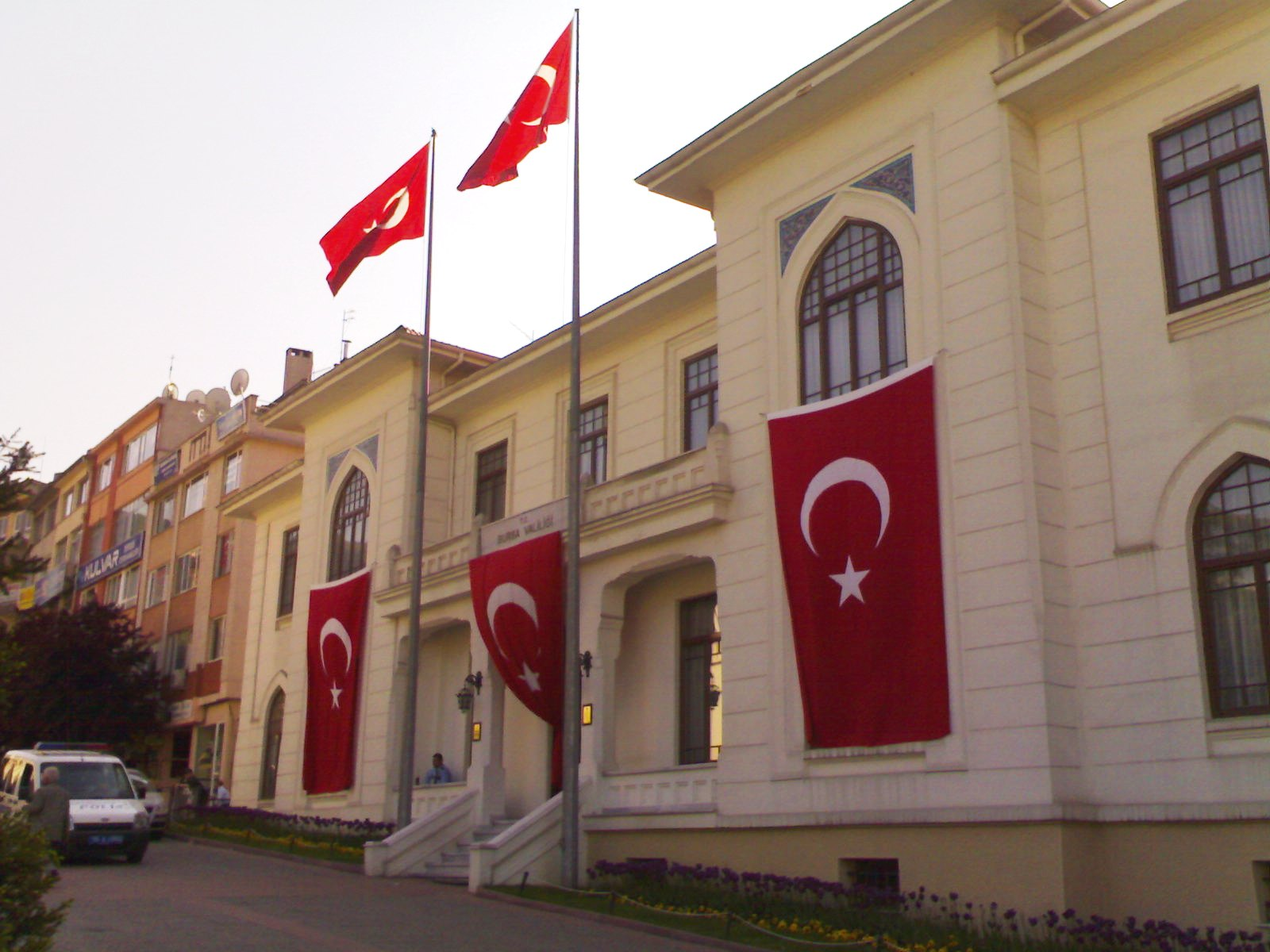
Governorate of Bursa

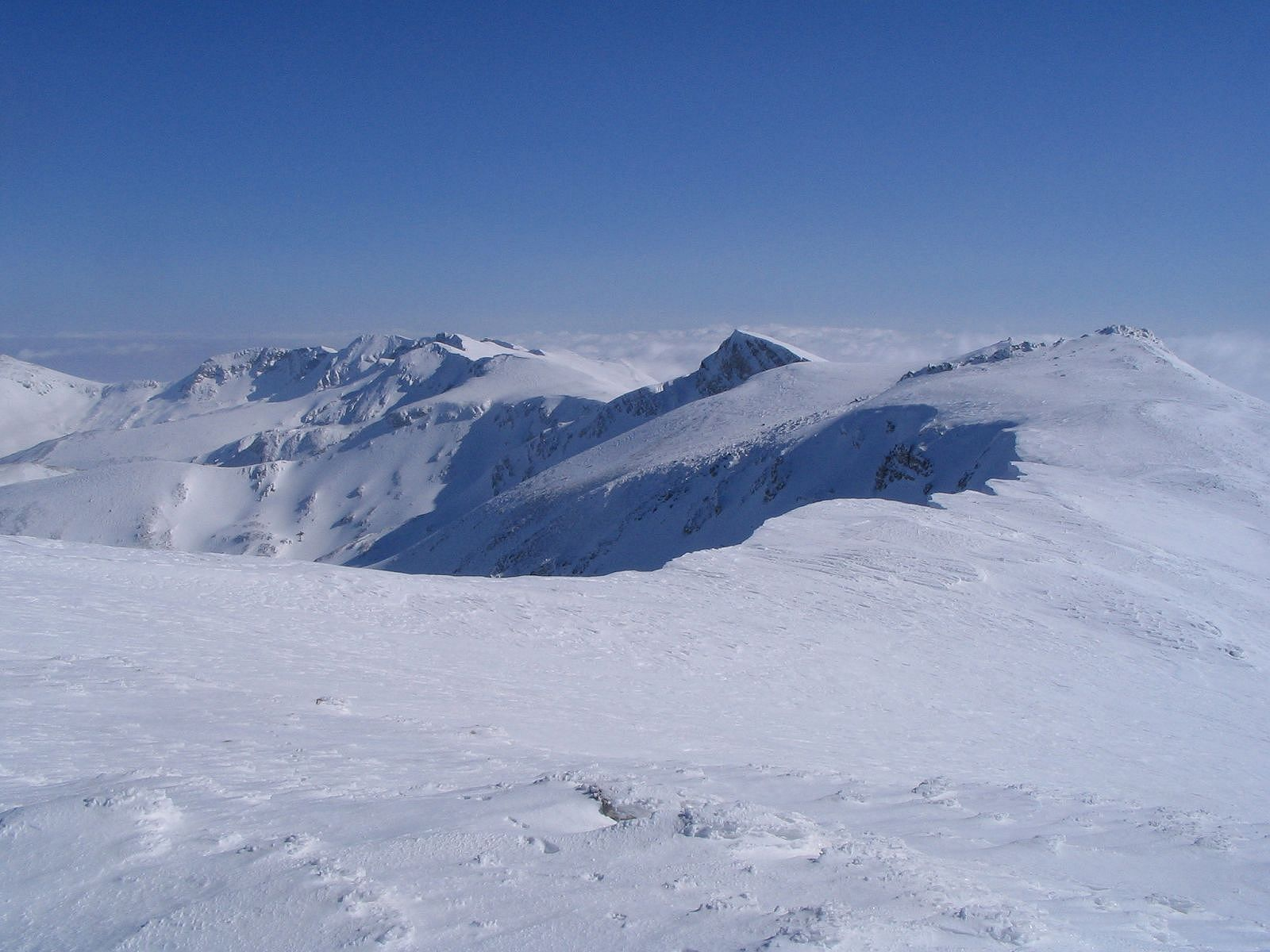
Mt. Uludağ is a popular ski destination.

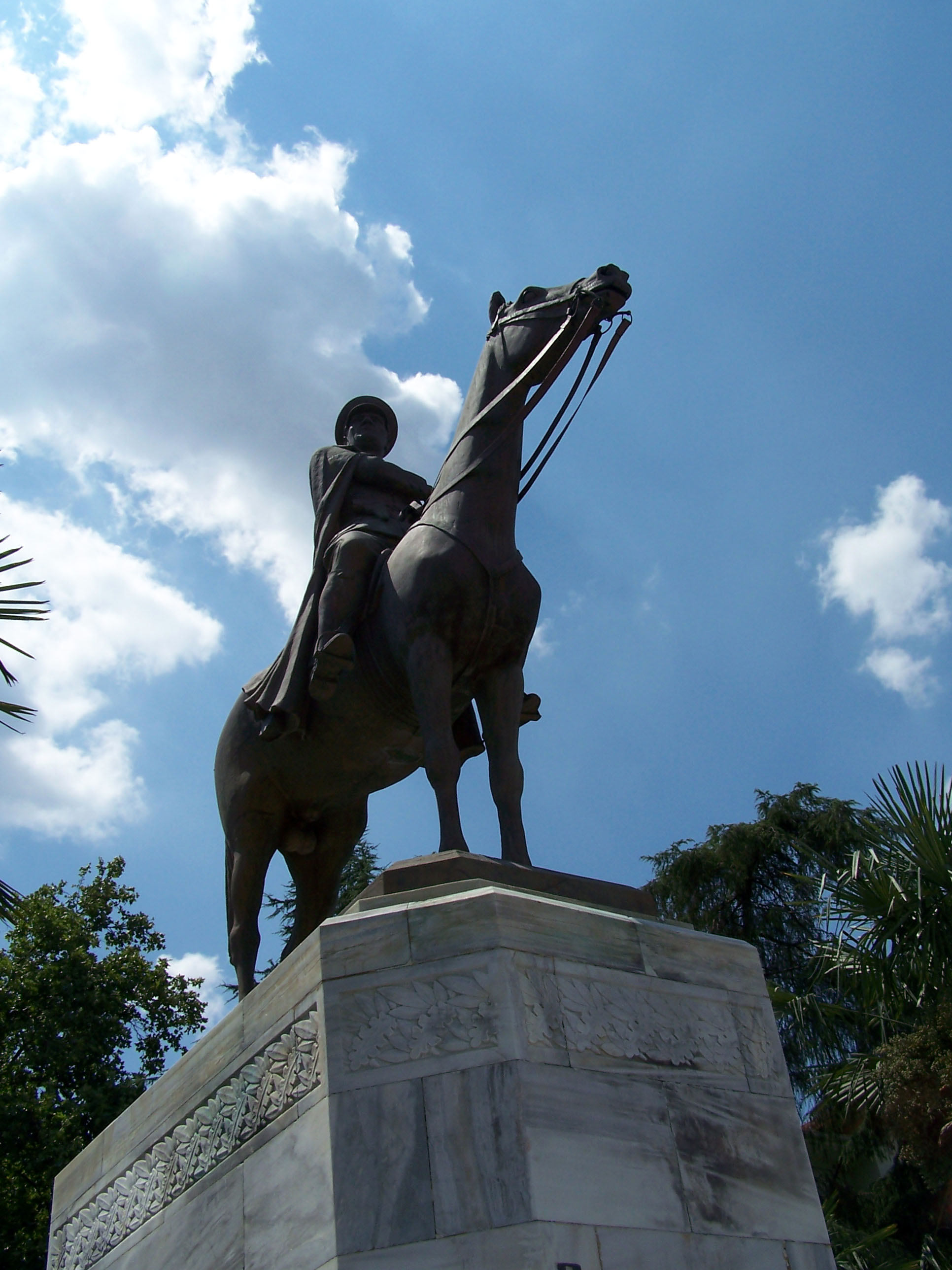
Statue of Atatürk in Bursa

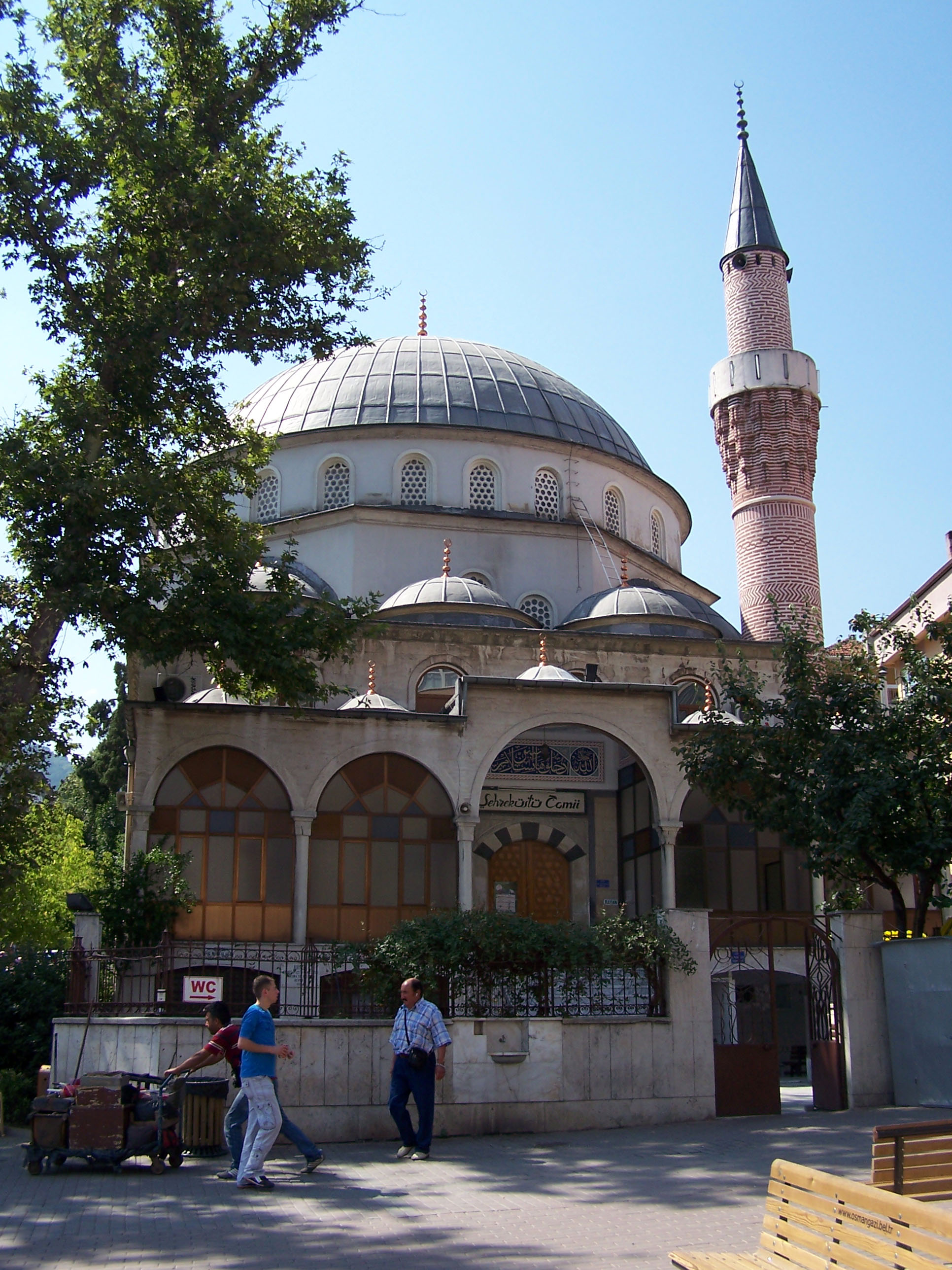
Şehreküstü Mosque

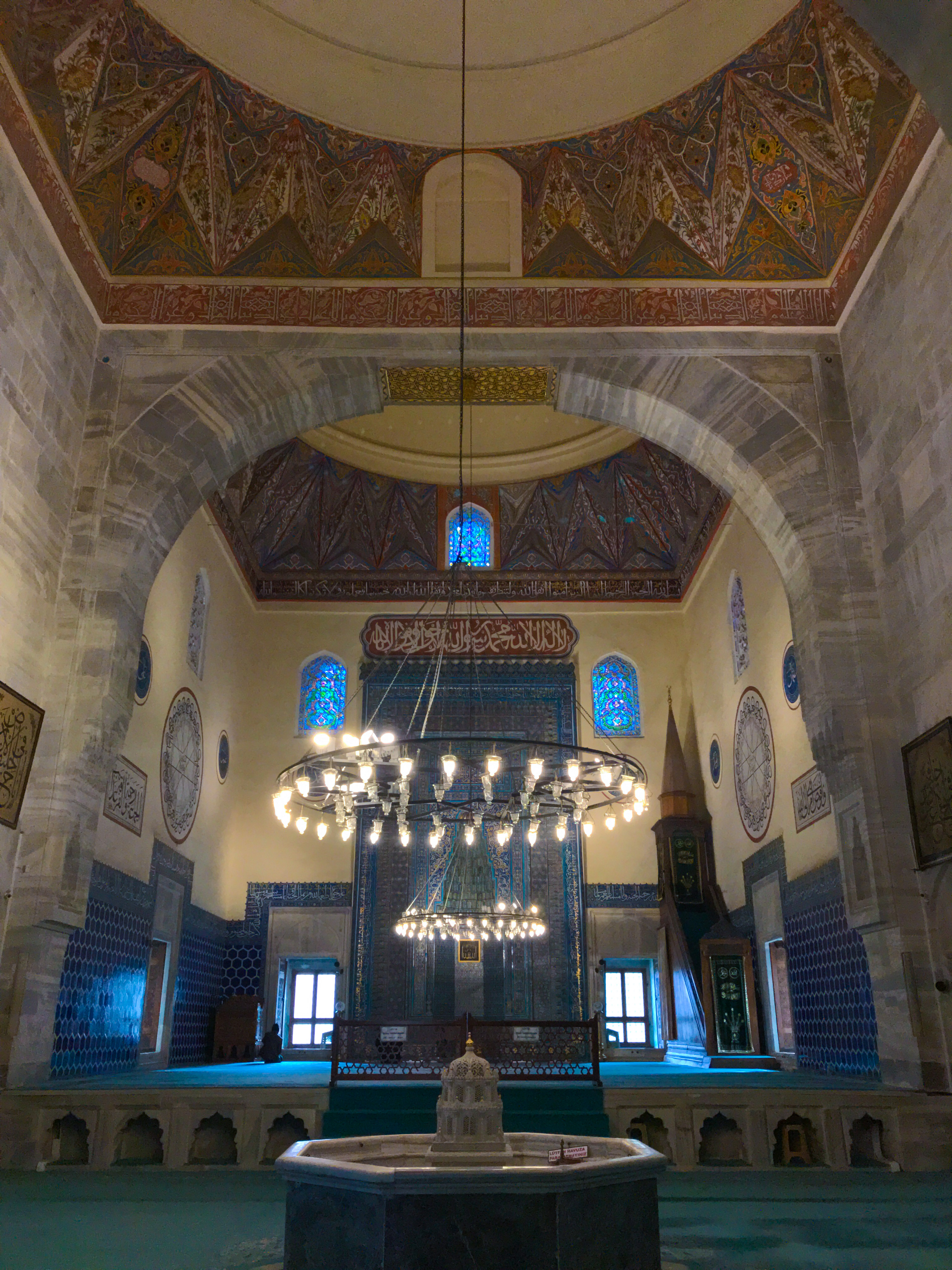
Interior of Yeşil Mosque

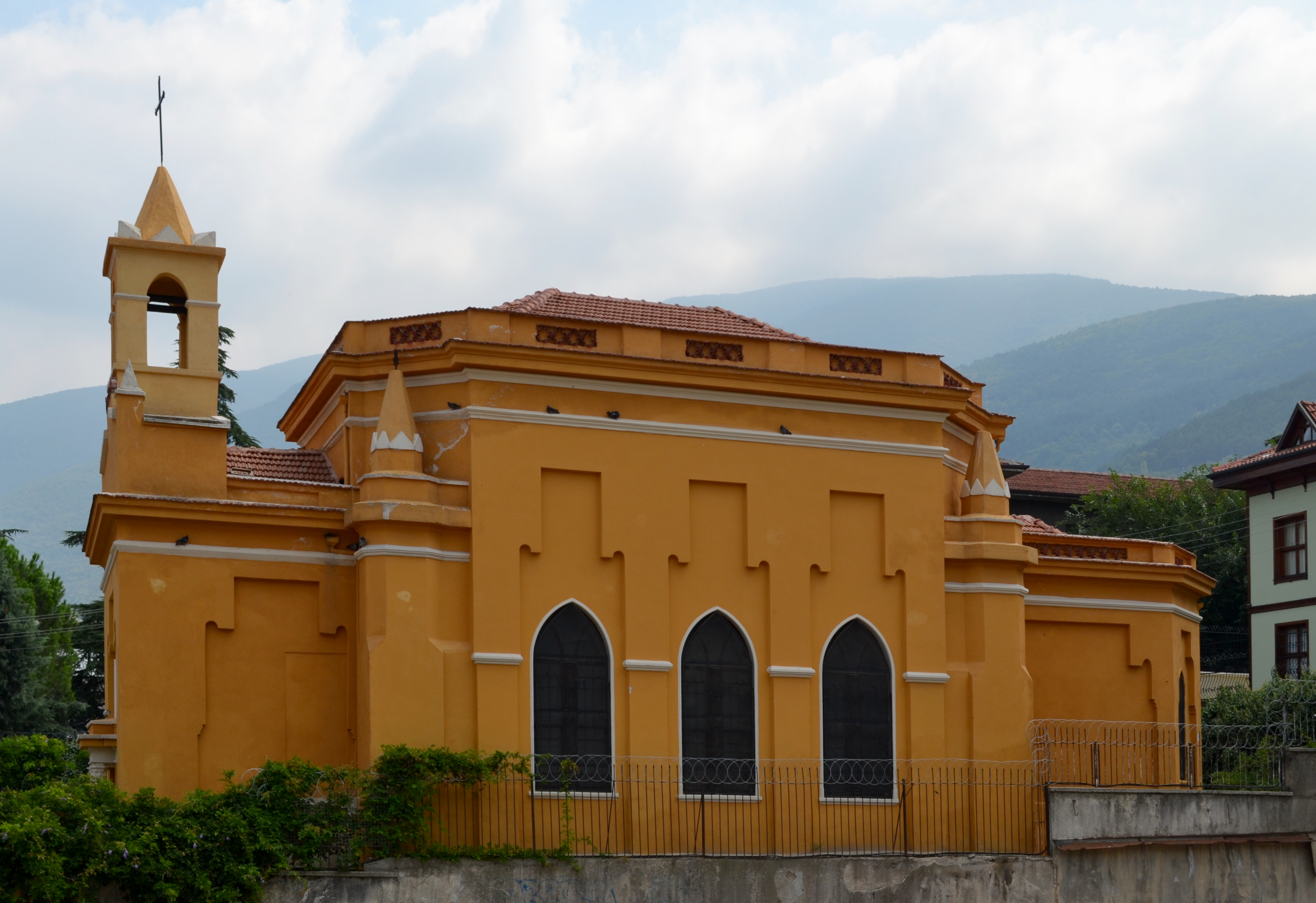
Bursa French Catholic Church

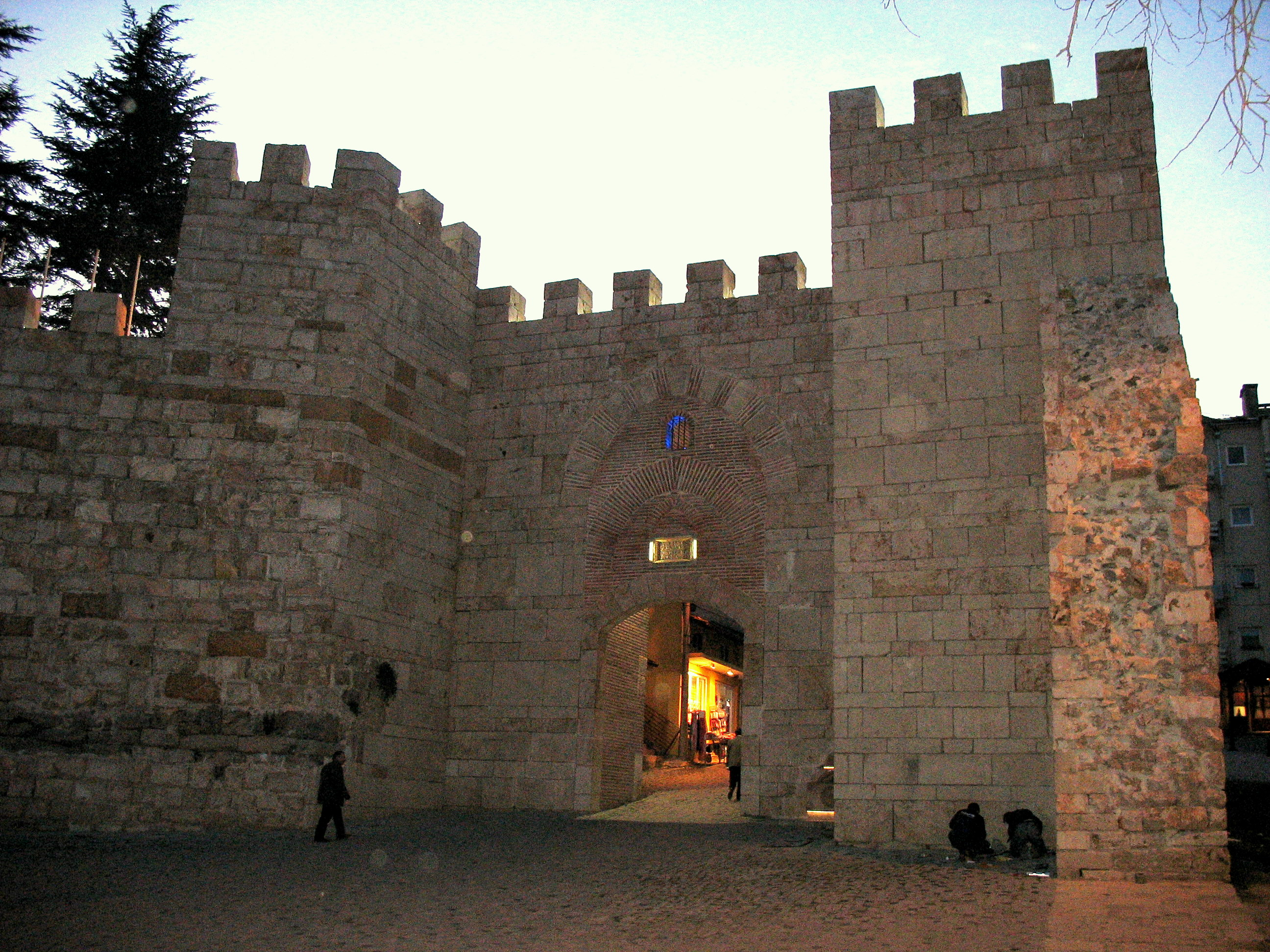
Saltanatkapı (Citadel Main Gate)

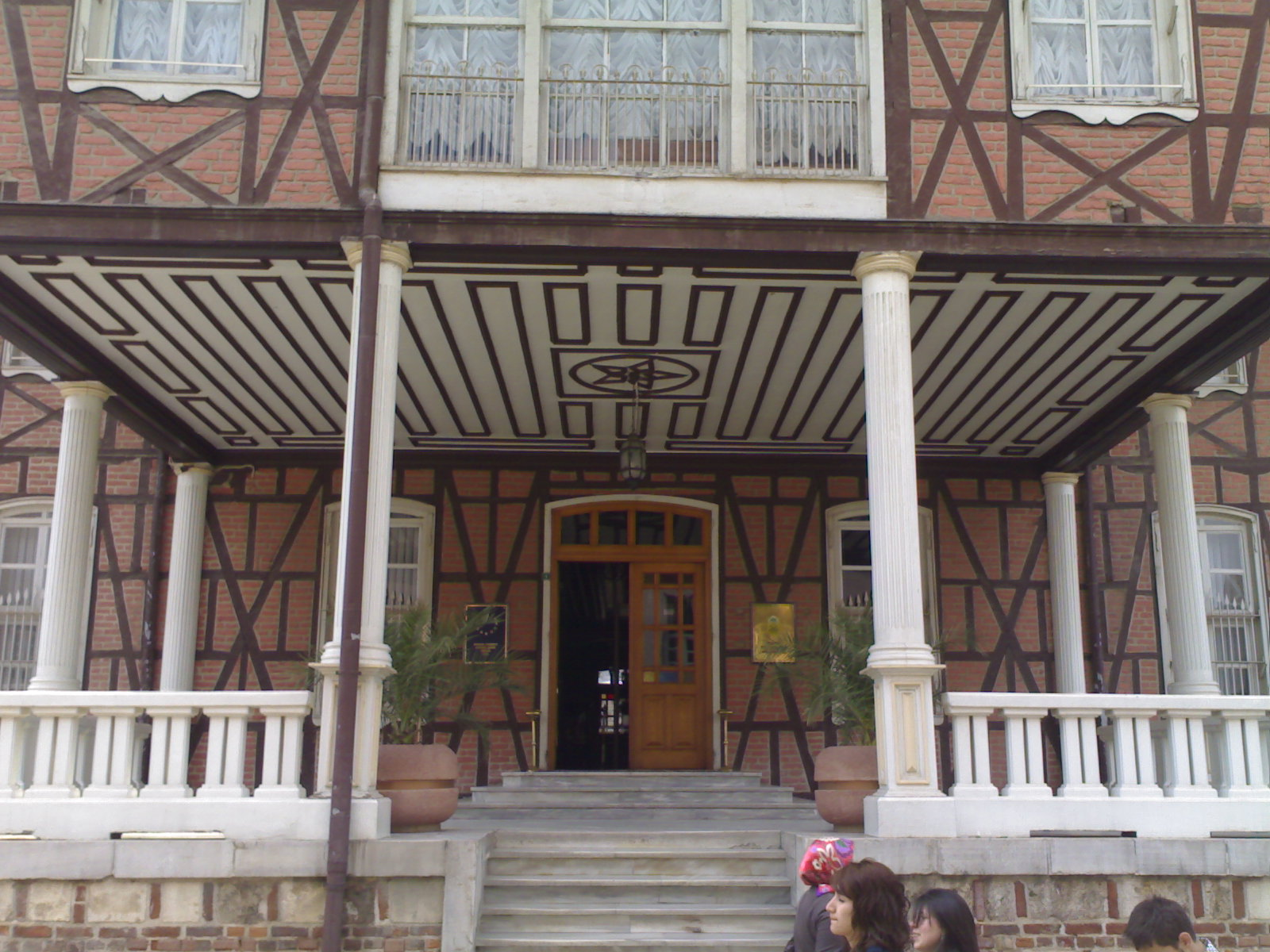
Old City Hall

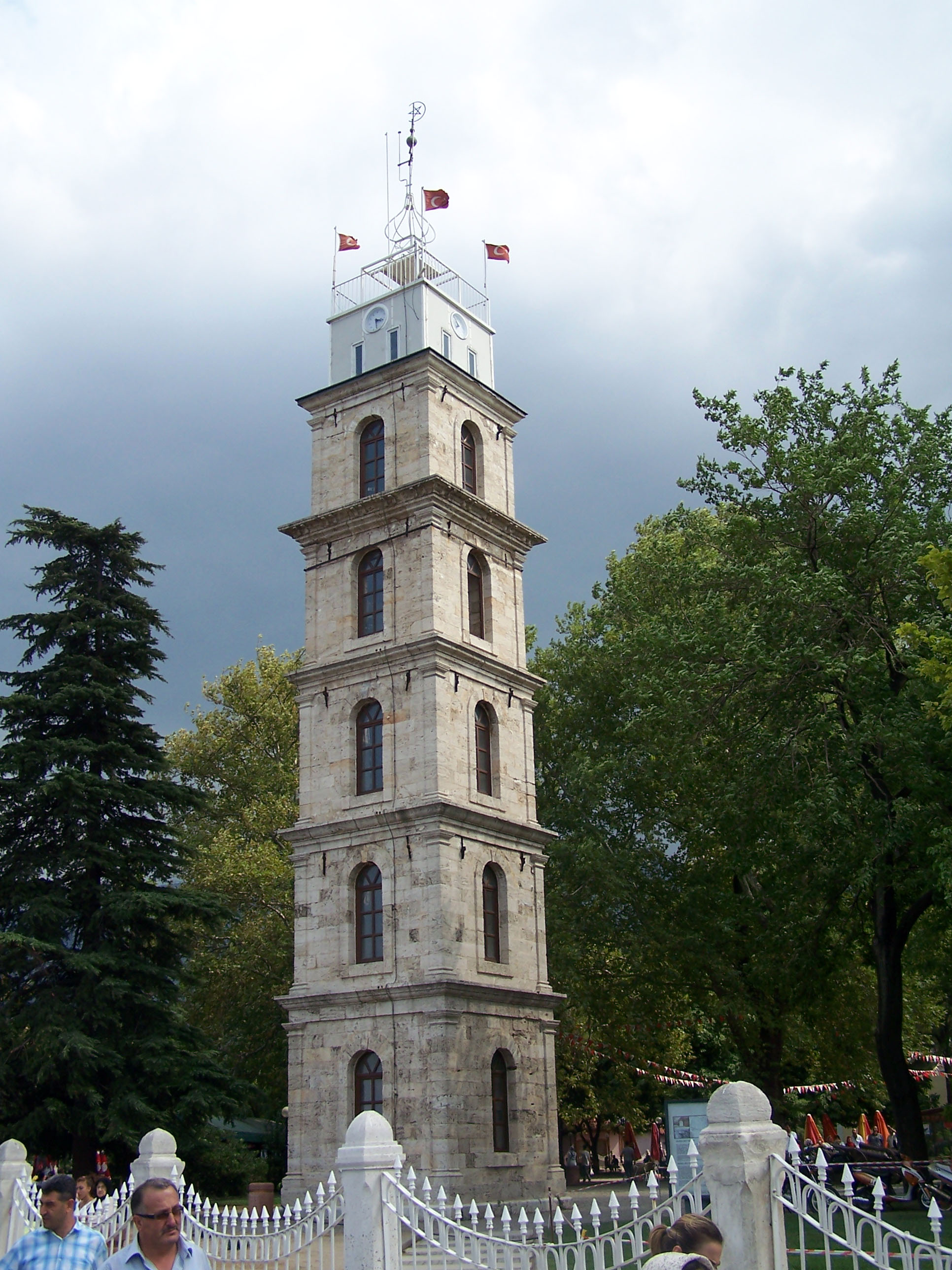
Tophane Clocktower

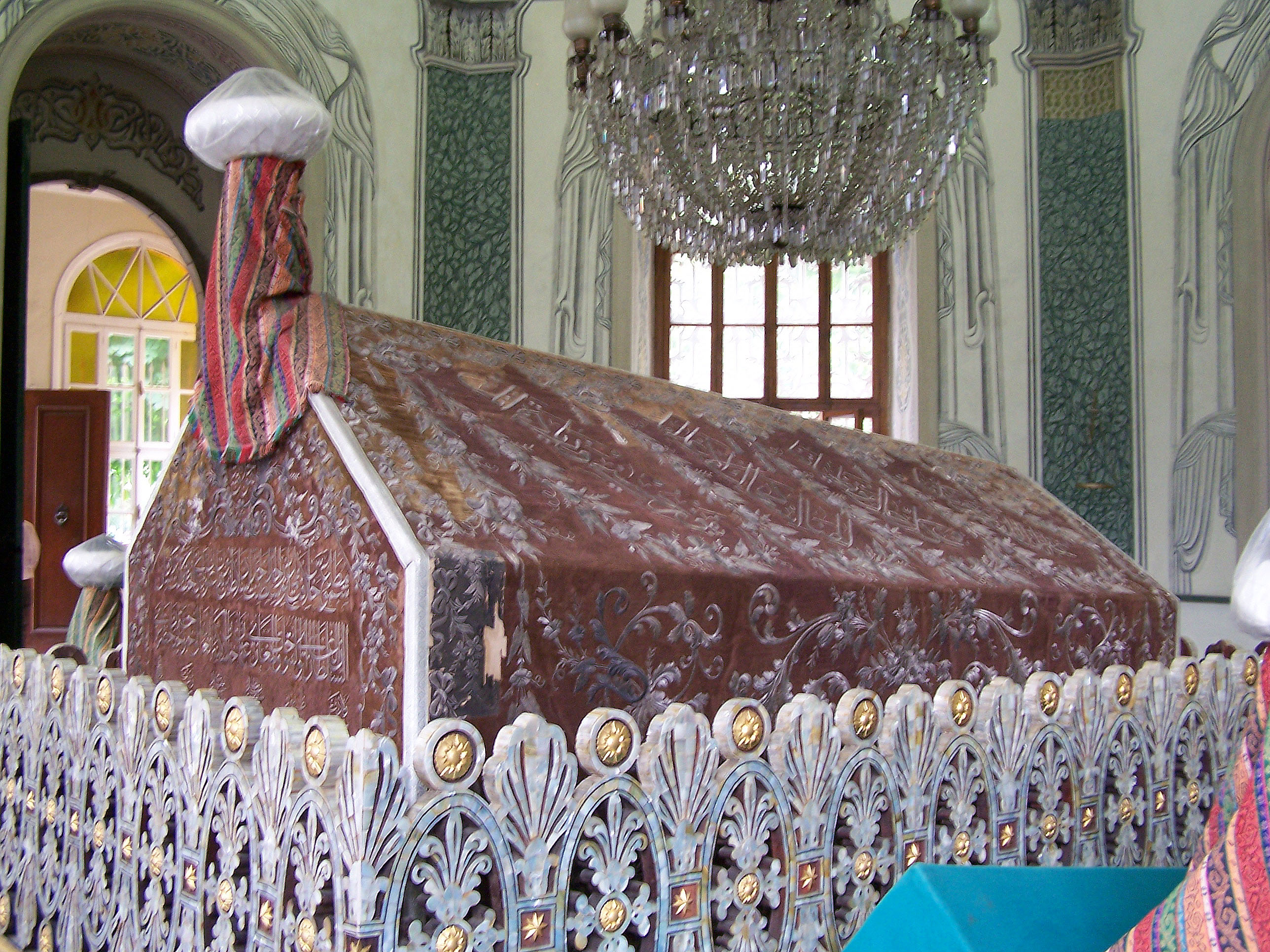
Tomb of Osman Gazi

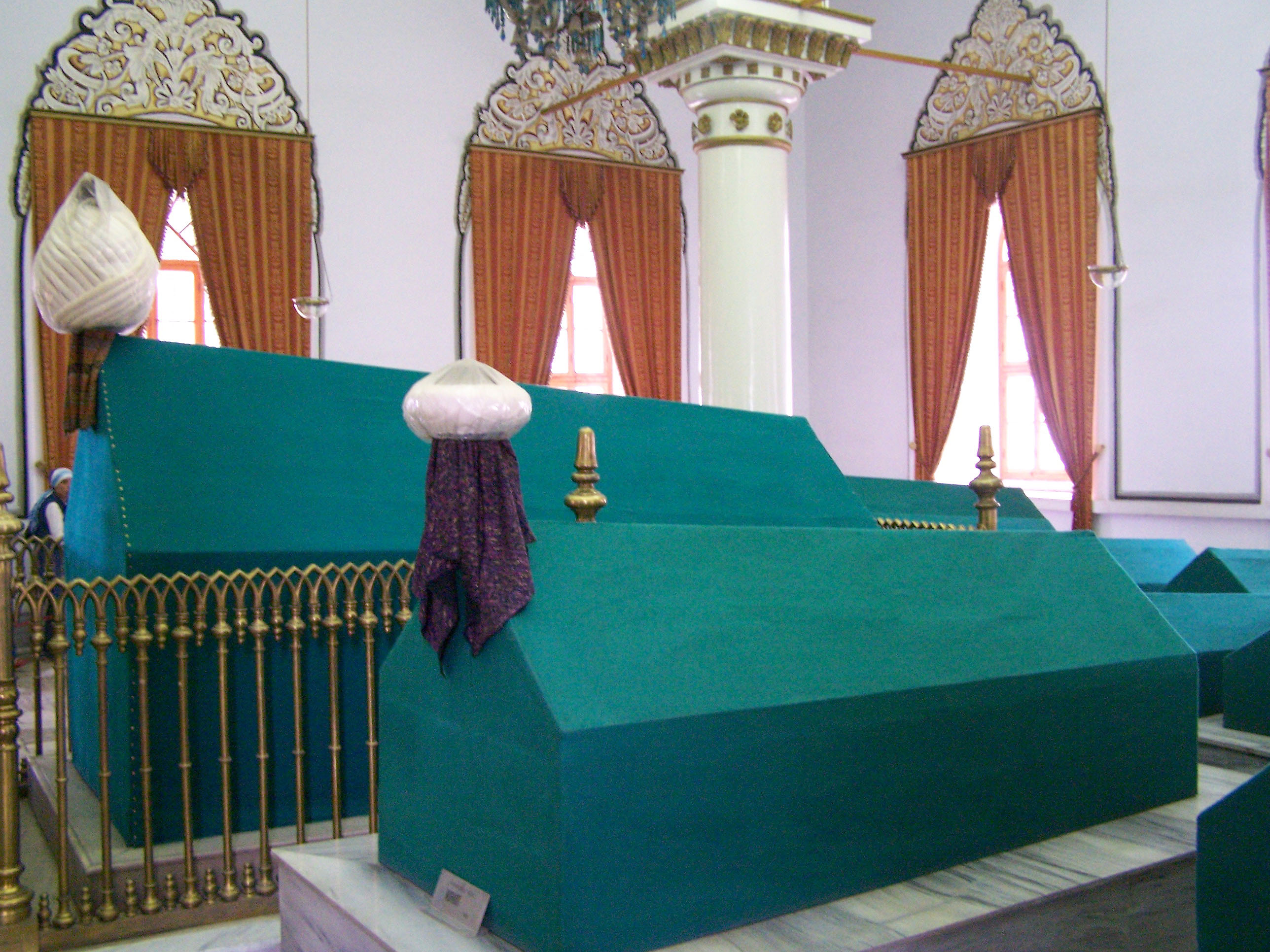
Tomb of Orhan Gazi

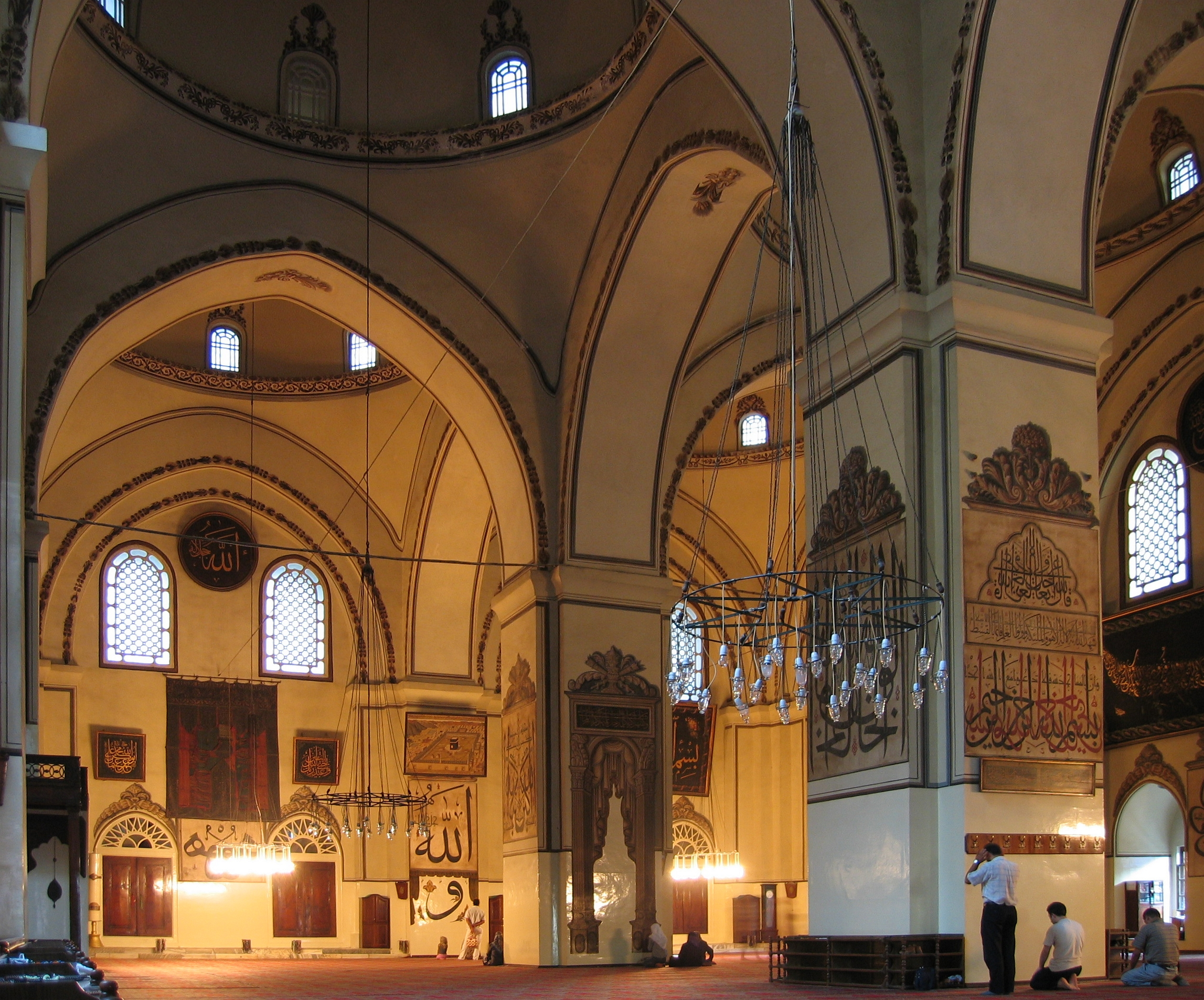
Interior of the Grand Mosque

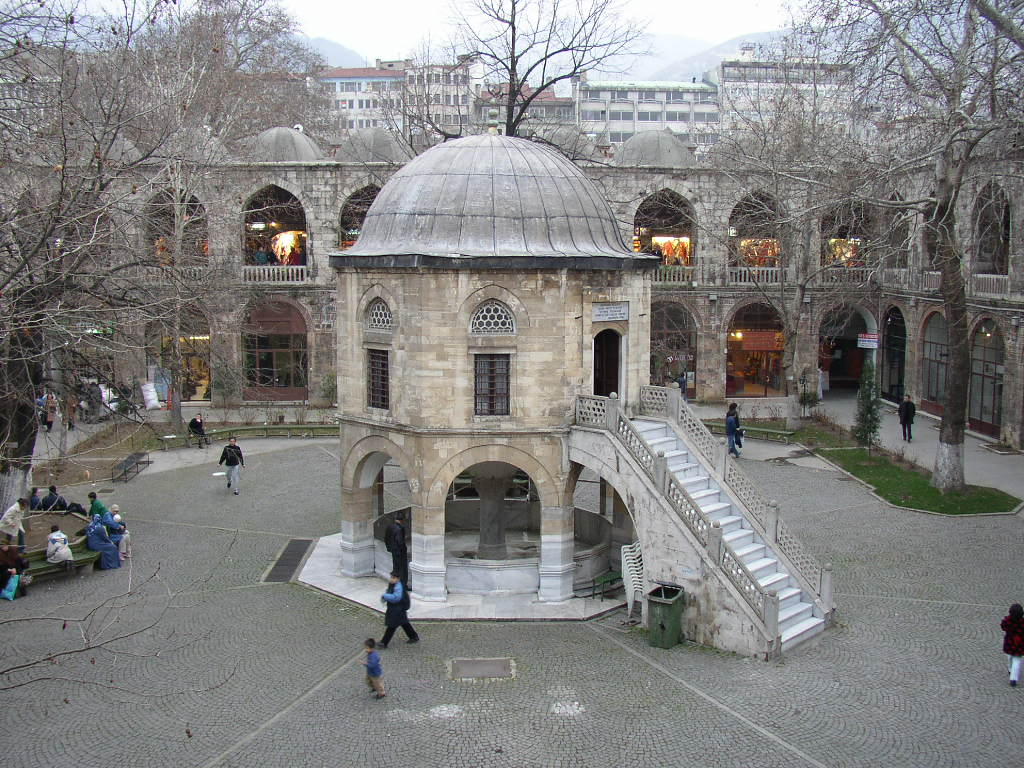
Koza Han (Silk Bazaar)

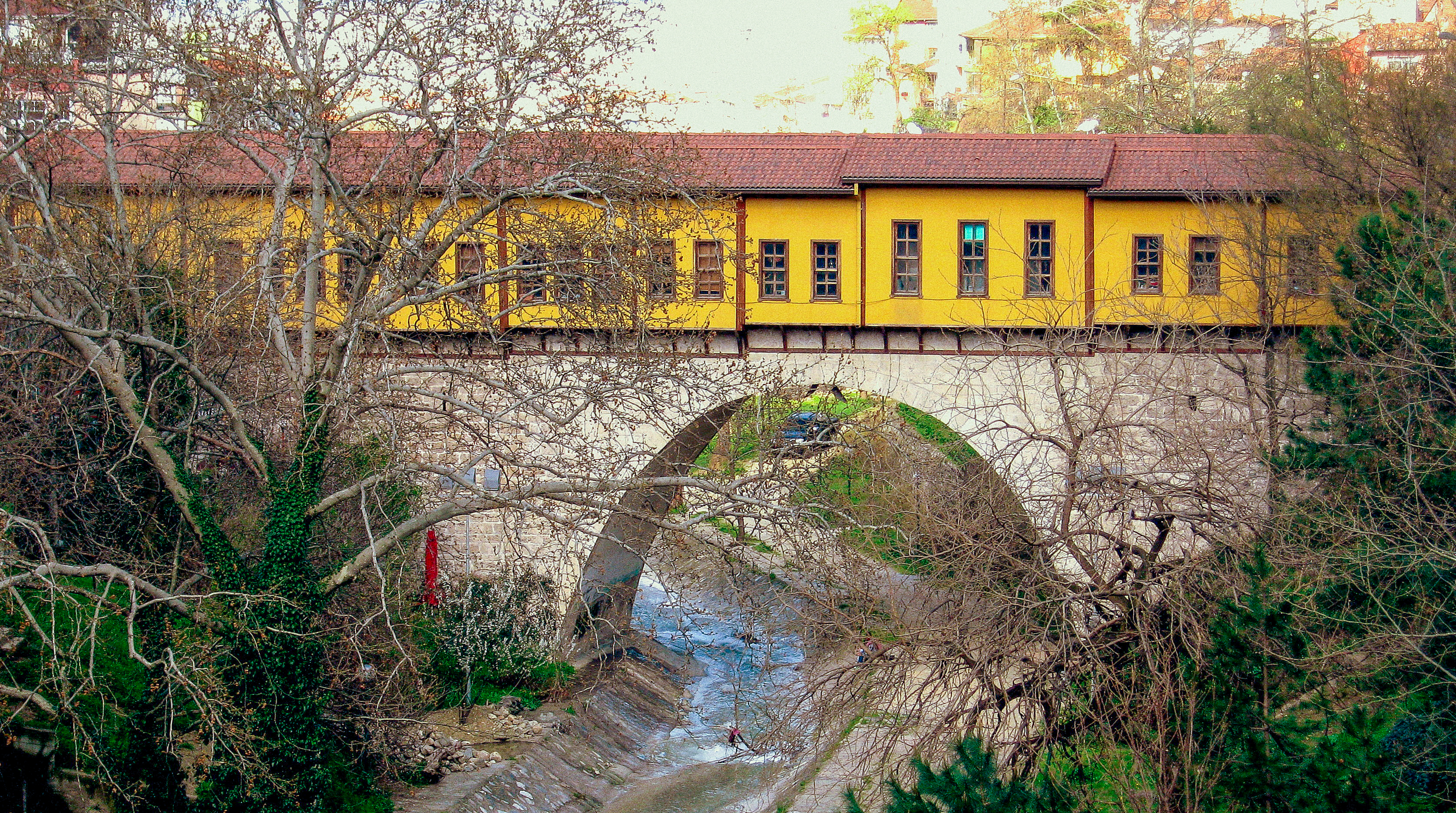
Irgandı Bridge

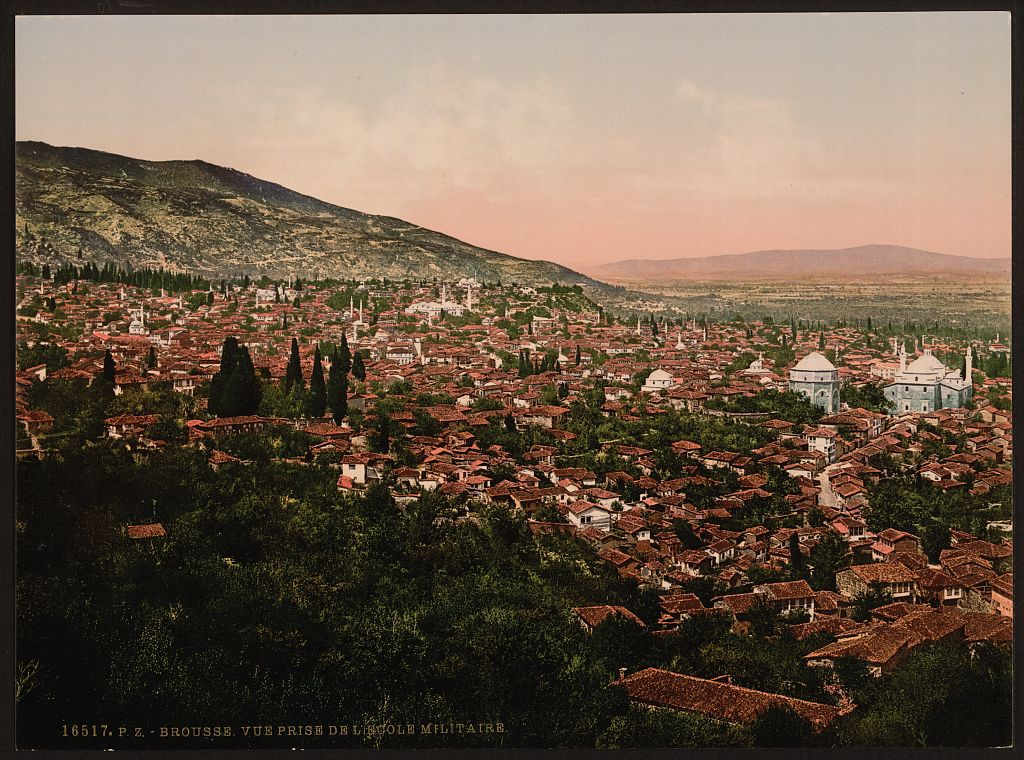
A view of Bursa in the late 19th century

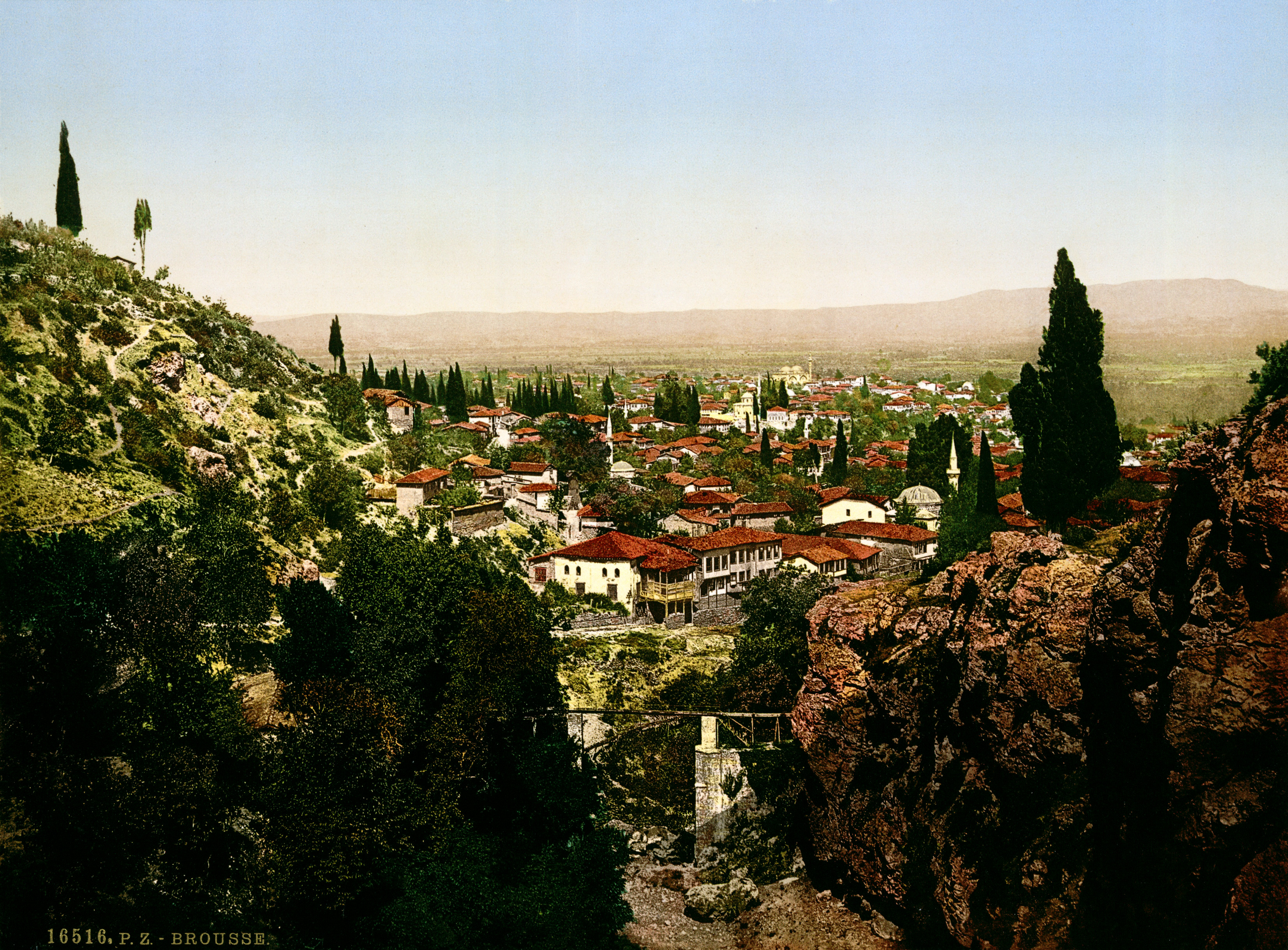
Bursa, c. 1895

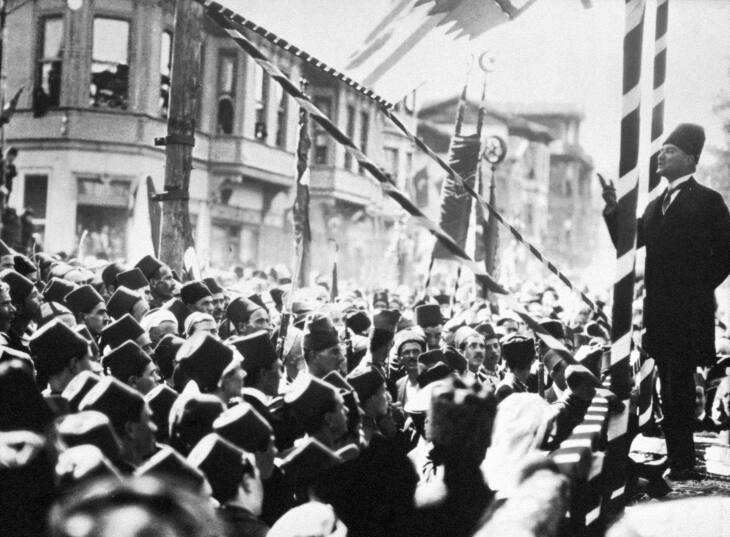
Atatürk delivering a speech in Bursa, 1924

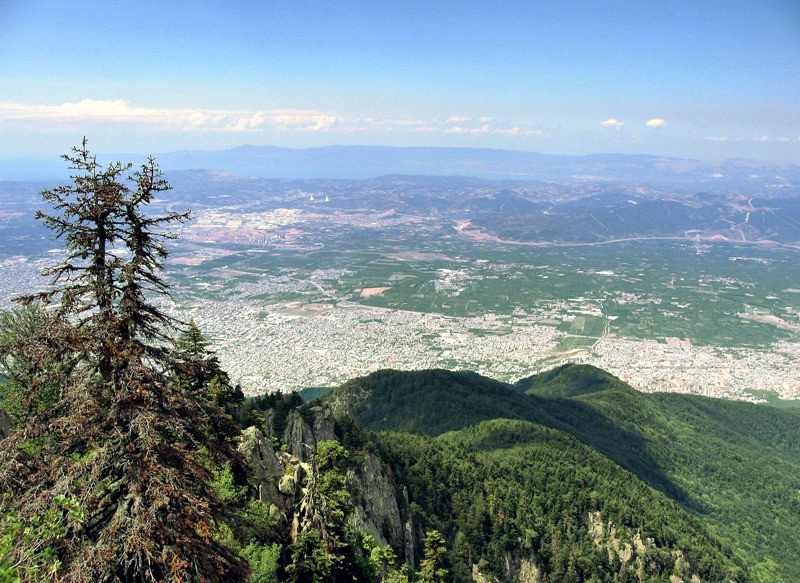
A view of Bursa from the foothills of Mt. Uludağ

=== Twin towns – sister cities ===
Bursa is twinned with:

- Darmstadt, Germany (1971)
- Sarajevo, Bosnia and Herzegovina (1972)
- Oulu, Finland (1978)
- Kairouan, Tunisia (1987)
- Anshan, China (1991)
- Bitola, North Macedonia (1996)
- Ceadîr-Lunga, Moldova (1997)
- Kyzylorda, Kazakhstan (1997)
- Mascara, Algeria (1998)
- Kulmbach, Germany (1998)
- Pleven, Bulgaria (1998)
- Plovdiv, Bulgaria (1998)
- Tirana, Albania (1998)
- Košice, Slovakia (2000)
- Vinnytsia, Ukraine (2004)
- Szentendre, Hungary (2005)
- Pristina, Kosovo (2010)
- Bakhchysarai, Ukraine (2010)
- Momchilgrad, Bulgaria (2010)
- Mogilev, Belarus (2013)
- Hebron, Palestine (2014)
- Herzliya, Israel (2014)
- Veliko Tărnovo, Bulgaria (2017)
- Galkayo, Somalia (2018)

== See also ==
- 1855 Bursa earthquake
- Complex of Mehmed I
- Emirsultan Mosque
- Grand Mosque of Bursa
- Green Tomb and Mosque
- List of people from Bursa
- List of World Heritage Sites in Turkey
- Siege of Bursa
