= Places of interest in Bursa =

This page is a list of places of interest in Bursa Province, Turkey.

== Fortresses and city walls ==
- Bursa Kalesi (Fortress)
- İznik Kalesi (Fortress)
- Kestel Kalesi (Fortress)
- Kite Kalesi (Fortress)
- Yer Kapı (Gate)
- Pınarbaşı Kapısı (Gate)
- Zindan Kapı (Gate)
- Kaplıcalar Kapısı (Gate)
- Istanbul Kapısı (Gate)
- Lefke Kapısı (Gate)
- Yenişehir Kapısı (Gate)

== Mosques ==
- Abdal Camii
- Ahmet Dai Camii
- Ahmet Paşa Fenari Camii
- Alaaddin Camii
- Ali Paşa Camii
- Ali Paşa Camii (Gemlik)
- Altıparmak Camii
- Araplar Camii
- Arap Mehmed Camii
- Ayasofya Camii (İznik)
- Ayaz Köyü Camii (Mustafakemalpaşa)
- Aynalı Camii
- Baba Sultan Camii (Gürsu)
- Balıkpazari Camii (Gemlik)
- Başçı İbrahim Camii
- Beyazit Paşa Camii
- Bedrettin (Hafsa Sultan) Camii
- Beşikçiler Camii
- Cumalıkızık Camii
- Daye Hatun (Taya Kadın) Camii
- Demirtaş (Timurtaş) Camii
- Duhtter-i Şerif (Fışkırık) Camii
- Emir Sultan Mosque
- Ertuğrul Camii
- Eski Camii (Karacabey)
- Eşrefzade Camii (İznik)
- Fatih Camii (Mudanya)
- Gençali Köyü Camii (Gemlik)
- Hacı Ali Paşa Camii (Gemlik)
- Hacılar Camii
- Halilağa Camii (Mudanya)
- Hamzabey Camii
- Hasanbey Camii (Mudanya)
- İbni Bezzaz Camii
- İbrahim Paşa Camii
- İvaz Paşa Camii
- Kavaklı Camii
- Kayan Camii
- Kiremitçi Camii
- Kurşunlu Camii (Karacabey)
- Mahmut Çelebi Camii (İznik)
- Molla Fenari Camii
- Muradiye Camii
- Namazgah Camii
- Nalbantoğlu Camii
- Umur Bey Camii
- Orhan Bey Camii
- Orhan Gazi Camii (Yenişehir)
- Piremir Camii
- Selimiye Camii
- Selimzade Camii
- Setbaşı(Karaçelebi) Camii
- Somuncu Baba (Şeyh Hamid) (Ayazma) Camii
- Şehadet(Saray) Camii
- Şekerhoca Camii
- Şerefüddin Paşa Camii
- Şeyh Müftü Camii (Mustafakemalpaşa)
- Şible(Şibli) Camii
- Teke-i Atik Camii (Mudanya)
- Tuzpazarı Camii
- Ulucami(Cami Kebir)
- Ulucami(Karacabey)
- Üç Kuzular Camii
- Üftade Camii
- Veled-i Veziri Camii
- Yerkapı (Bab-i Zemin) (Kara Ali) Camii
- Yeşil Mosque
- Yeşil Cami (İznik)
- Bayezid I Mosque and complex (külliye) - Yıldırım Camii ve külliyesi-
- Yiğit Cedid Camii
- Yiğit Köhne Camii

== Small mosques (Mesjids) ==
- Acem Reis (Arab Dede) Mescidi
- Akbiyik (Veled-İ Harir) Mescidi
- Alacahirka Mescidi
- Alanyeri (İsmail Hakki) Mescidi
- Azeb Bey Mescidi
- Çakirağa (Mecnun Dede) Mescidi
- Çukur Mahalle Mescidi
- Davut Paşa Mescidi
- Ebu İshak Mescidi
- Güngörmez Mescidi
- Haci Mehmed Ağa Mescidi (Mudanya)
- Haci Özbek Mescidi (İznik)
- Haci Sevinç Mescidi
- Haci Seyfettin (Seyfuddin) Mescidi
- İmaret-İ İsabey Mescidi
- Reyhan (Acemler) Mescidi
- Selçuk Hatun Mescidi
- Tahtali Mescid
- Veled-İ Yaniç Mescidi
- Yeni Kaplica Mescidi

== Churches ==
- Ayasofya Church (İznik)
- Aydınpınar Köyü Church (Mudanya)
- Çamlıca Köyü Church (Karacabey)
- Çatalağıl Church (Demirtaş)
- Dereköy Church (Mudanya)
- Eski Karaağaç Köyü Church (Karacabey)
- Fransız Protestan Kilise (Bursa)
- H.Georgios Church (Gölyazı)
- Harmanlı Köyü Church (Karacabey)
- İznik Church (İznik)
- Zoimesis Tes Theotokos Church (İznik)
- Aziz Tryphonos Church (İznik)
- Karakoca Köyü Church (Karacabey)
- Koimesis Tes Theotokos Church (Demirtaş)
- H.Konstantinos Church (Gölyazı)
- Kumyaka Church (Mudanya)
- Michael Taxiarches Church (Demirtaş)
- Mudanya Church (Mudanya)
- Theodoros Church (Çalı)

== Tombs (Türbes) ==
- Abdüllatif Kutsi Türbesi
- Ahmed Paşa Türbesi
- Akbiyik Türbesi
- Azeb Bey Türbesi
- Çobanbey Türbesi
- Ebu İshak Türbesi
- Emir Sultan Türbesi
- Gazi Timurtaş Türbesi
- Halil Hayreddin Ve Ali Paşa Türbesi (İznik)
- Hamzabey Türbesi
- Hatice Sultan Türbesi
- Hatuniye Türbesi
- İbrahim Paşa Türbesi (İznik)
- Kara Mustafa Paşa Türbesi
- Kirgizlar Türbesi (İznik)
- Mükrime Hatun Türbesi
- Okçu Baba Türbesi
- Omur (Umur) Bey Türbesi
- Orhan Gazi Türbesi
- Osmangazi Türbesi
- Sarı Saltuk Türbesi (İznik)
- Süleyman Çelebi Türbesi
- Şahin (Şahan) Baba Türbesi (Keles)
- Şehzade Mahmut Türbesi
- Şehzade Mustafa (Mustafa-İ Cedid) Türbesi
- Şehzade Mustafa (Ahmet) (Cem Sultan) Türbesi
- Şirin Hatun Türbesi
- Üç Kuzular Türbesi
- Yakup Çelebi Türbesi (İznik)
- Yeşil (Çelebi Sultan Mehmet) Türbesi
- Yildirim Bayezid Türbesi

== Madrasas ==
- Lala Şahin Paşa (Hisar) Madrasa
- Muradiye Madrasa
- Süleyman Paşa Madrasa (İznik)
- Vaiziye (Mahkeme) Madrasa
- Yeşil (Sultan) Madrasa

== Museums ==
- Tofaş Museum of Cars and Anatolian Carriages
- Hünkar Köşkü Museum
- Uluumay Ottoman Folk Clothing and Jewelry Museum
- Bursa City Museum
- Bursa Archaeological Museum
- Bursa Energy Museum
- Bursa Forestry Museum
- Bursa Museum of Turkish and Islamic Art
- Museum of Ottoman House
- Bursa Atatürk Museum
- Hüsnü Züber Evi / Yaşayan (Living) Museum

== Hammams (Turkish Baths) ==
- Aksu Köyü Hammam
- Baba Sultan Hammam (Gürsu)
- Cikcik (Gir Çik) Hammam
- Çekirge Hammam
- Davut Paşa (Bat Bazaar) Hammam
- Demirtaş (Timurtaş) Hammam
- Emir Sultan Hammam
- Eski Yeni (Ördekli) Hammam
- Eyne Bey Hammam
- Haci Hamza Hammam (İznik)
- Hançerli Hammam
- Haydarhane Hammam
- Horhor Hammam
- İncirli Hammam
- Büyük Hammam (İznik)
- Kayan (Kaygan) Hammam
- Keçeli Hammam
- Mahkeme (İbrahim Paşa) Hammam
- Muradiye Hammam
- Nalincilar (Tahil) Hammam
- Nasuh Paşa Hammam
- Omur (Umur) Bey Hammam
- Orhanbey Hammam
- Orhangazi Hammam
- Orhangazi Hammam (İznik)
- Perşembe (Kadi / Hamam-İ Atik) Hammam
- Reyhan Hammam
- Servinaz Hammam
- Şengül Hammam
- Tahir Ağa Hammam (Mudanya)
- Tavuk Pazari Hammam
- Yahudiler Hammam
- Yakup Bey Hammam (Keles)
- Yeşil Hammam
- Yıldırım Hammam

== Caravanserais (Hans) ==
- Balı Bey Caravanserai
- Emir Caravanserai
- Eski Yeni Caravanserai
- Hoca Dursun Caravanserai (Gürsu)
- Geyve (Hacı İvaz-Payigah) Caravanserai
- İpek Caravanserai
- Koza Caravanserai
- Pirinç Caravanserai
- Tuz Caravanserai
- Fidan Caravanserai

== Bridges ==
- Abdal Bridge
- Cılımboz Bridge
- Demirtaş Bridge
- Irgandı Bridge
- Meydancık (Geredeli) Bridge
- Setbaşı Bridge
- Tatarlar Bridge

== Hotsprings ==
- Vakifbahçe (Çekirge) Hotspring
- Bademli Bahçe Hotspring
- Dümbüldek Hotspring
- Gemlik (Terme) Hotspring
- Armutlu Hotspring
- Oylat Hotspring
- Ağaçhisar Hotspring
- Sadağ Hotspring
- Çitli Maden Mineral Water Spring
- Mineviz Mineral Water Spring
- Akarca Mineral Water Spring
