= List of municipalities in Burdur Province =

This is the List of municipalities in Burdur Province, Turkey as of January 2023.

District	Municipality
Ağlasun	Ağlasun
Altınyayla	Altınyayla
Bucak	Bucak
Bucak	Kızılkaya
Bucak	Kocaaliler
Burdur	Burdur
Çavdır	Çavdır
Çavdır	Söğüt
Çeltikçi	Çeltikçi
Gölhisar	Gölhisar
Gölhisar	Yusufça
Karamanlı	Karamanlı
Kemer	Kemer
Tefenni	Tefenni
Yeşilova	Yeşilova
