= Avdancık =

Avdancık can refer to:

- Avdancık, Bucak
- Avdancık, Osmangazi
