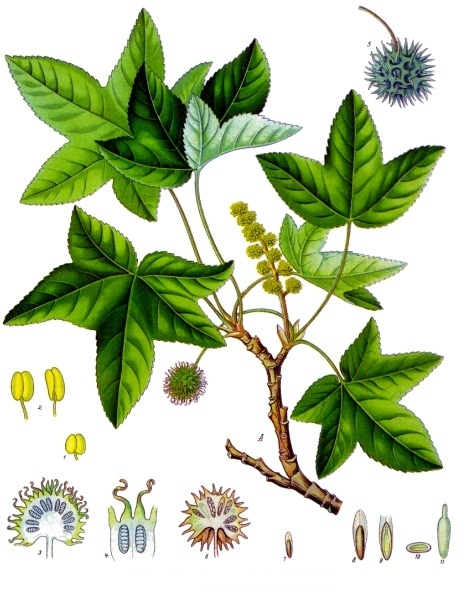
- 19th century illustration of oriental sweetgum

Conservation status
- Endangered (IUCN 3.1)

Scientific classification
- Kingdom: Plantae
- Clade: Tracheophytes
- Clade: Angiosperms
- Clade: Eudicots
- Order: Saxifragales
- Family: Altingiaceae
- Genus: Liquidambar
- Species: L. orientalis

Binomial name
- Liquidambar orientalis Mill.
- Distribution map

= Liquidambar orientalis =

Oriental sweetgum

Species of tree

Liquidambar orientalis, commonly known as oriental sweetgum or Turkish sweetgum, is a deciduous tree in the genus Liquidambar, native to the eastern Mediterranean region, that occurs as pure stands mainly in the floodplains of southwestern Turkey and on the Greek island of Rhodes.

== Description ==
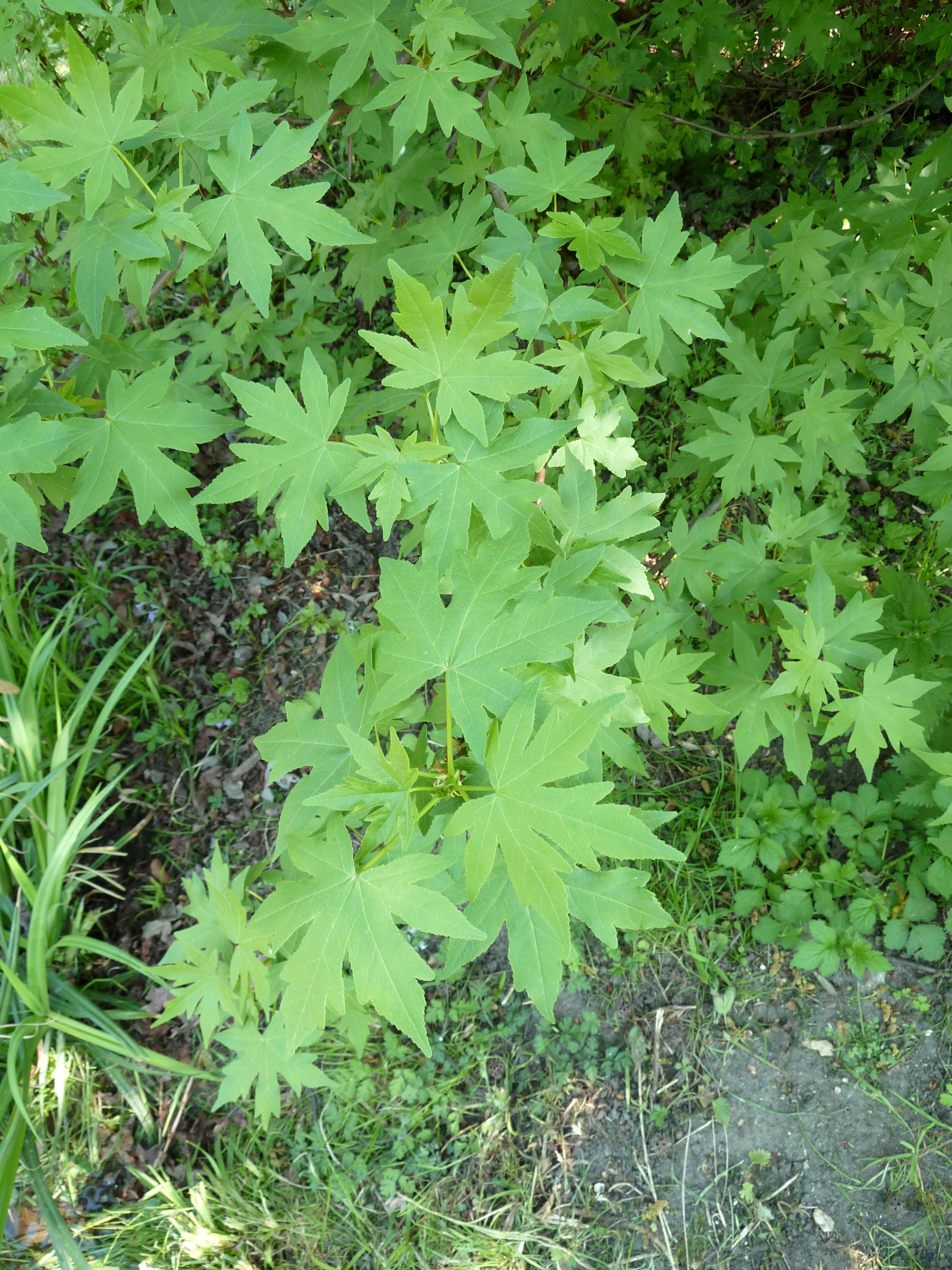
Foliage

Oriental sweet gum is a deciduous tree, 30–35 m (98–115 ft) in height with a trunk of 100 cm (39 in) in diameter. The unisexual flowers bloom from March to April. The fruits ripen in November to December, and the seeds are wind dispersed. The tree is very attractive and especially valued for its colourful autumn leaves. Oriental sweet gum trees favour an elevation of between 0–400 m (0–1,312 ft), a mean annual rainfall of 1,000–1,200 mm (39–47 in) and a mean annual temperature of 18 °C (64 °F). The tree's optimal growth is on rich, deep and moist soils such as bogs, river banks and coastal areas, but it is also able to grow on slopes and dry soil.

The bark is not cracked when young but fissured when old. The bark is grayish when young and turns grayish-brown or brown with age. Young lenticels are first greenish, then reddish-brown and thin. The lenticels on the bare and shiny lenticels are small and visible to the naked eye. The lateral buds are arranged in a multi-row spiral on the shoots and are more or less inclined to the lenticel. The apical bud is slightly larger than the lateral buds. The buds are egg-shaped, ellipsoid and pointed, shiny, and the margins of the scales are slightly lashed, brown and bare. The color of the scales is apple green-brown. When rubbed, it is aromatic.

In leaves with five lobes and radial veins, each lobe is usually divided into secondary lobes. The number of lobes with a blunt or pointed tip is rarely 3 or 7. The margins of the leaves are fine and regularly toothed. At the base of the leaf blade, at the junction of the main veins, bundles of hairs are stalked, and on some leaves the hairs in question are negligible. The upper surface is completely bare and bright green. The stem of the leaf is thin and quite long. Male flowers are in the form of a board, and those on the upper axis of the buds are dense and sessile, and those on the lower side are less frequent.

The flowers are spherical, adorned with small reddish flowers. When the flower matures, it turns into a prickly cone and turns grayish-green. The female flowers are green when they first form, and later turn reddish. They are slightly hairy, remain unshed in the fruit and harden and gain a woody structure. The fruit hangs down at the end of a long stalk. When they mature, they harden, the capsules open, and the seeds are shed. The color of the seed, which has very small wings, is dark brown, flattened, rounded at the bottom, and pointed at the tip. The seed coat is shiny, thin and hard.

== Distribution and habitat ==
The forests of this Tertiary relict endemic taxon are found notably within a specially protected area between Dalyan and Köyceğiz in Muğla Province, Turkey, where a 286 ha (710 acres) zone is set aside as a nature reserve and arboretum for the preservation of the species. A large stand also surrounds Marmaris. Another sweetgum forest area of 88.5 ha (219 acres) under protection is situated in Burdur's district of Bucak alongside Karacaören dam reservoir on the road to Antalya. The trees are also found locally in Denizli's districts of Beyağaç and Tavas. The total area of pure sweetgum forests in Turkey covers 1,348 ha (3,330 acres), all in the southwestern regions of the country. The present-day extension corresponds to a marked decrease since the 1940s level of 6,000–7,000 ha (15,000–17,000 acres), although the protective measures and infrastructure in place since the 1980s helped stop loss of stands and led to slight improvements. The species is also found on the Greek island of Rhodes, in a riparian forest inside a narrow, steep valley on the island's north coast.

== Etymology ==
The name in Turkish for the species is "Sığla ağacı", while the name in Greek is Ζητιά (Zitia).

== Production and uses ==
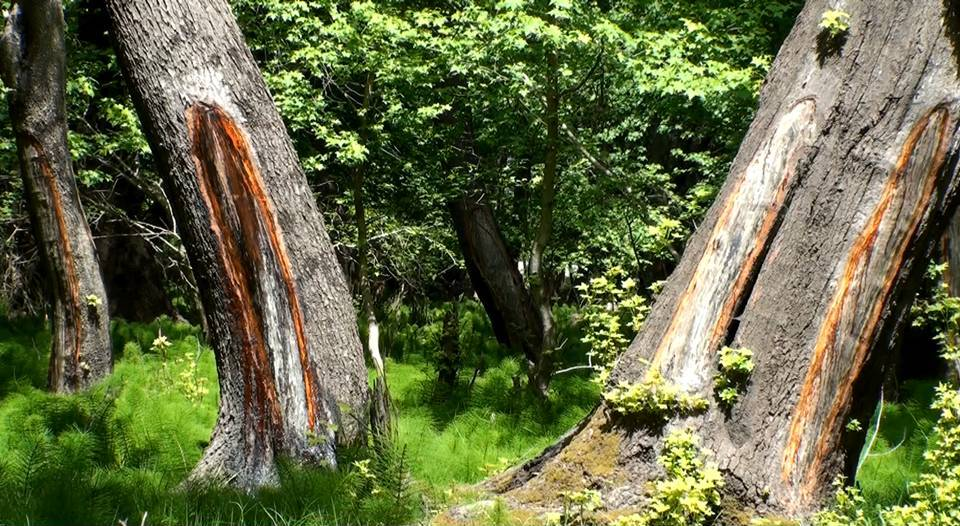
Trunks at Kavakarası liquidambar forest

Used as a "love potion" and perfume by the Egyptian Queen Cleopatra in the past, oil (Ancient Greek: στύραξ) has also been used as a medicine since the Hippocratic period. The ancient Egyptians also used the oil during embalming. Amphorae filled with oil unearthed from sunken Phoenician ships show that sweetgum oil occupied an important place in Mediterranean trade in the past.

The extraction of its sap and the production of a balsam based thereof (sığla yağı), as well as exports of these products, play an important role in the local economies of Greece and Turkey. The harvest of the sap and the preparation of the oil involve quite strenuous tasks lasting from May to November and consisting of several separate phases. The thick sap is obtained in the period June to September by gradually stripping a quarter of the total trunk lengthwise. Wounding the trunk causes sap to emerge, which can be further stimulated by tapping the trunk. The stripped sap is put in boiling water to soften, then pressed. The styrax is then diluted with water, keeping it soft and preserving its aroma. By steam distillation, a light yellow oil is obtained. There is a danger of the present generation of master oil makers not being replaced in near future.

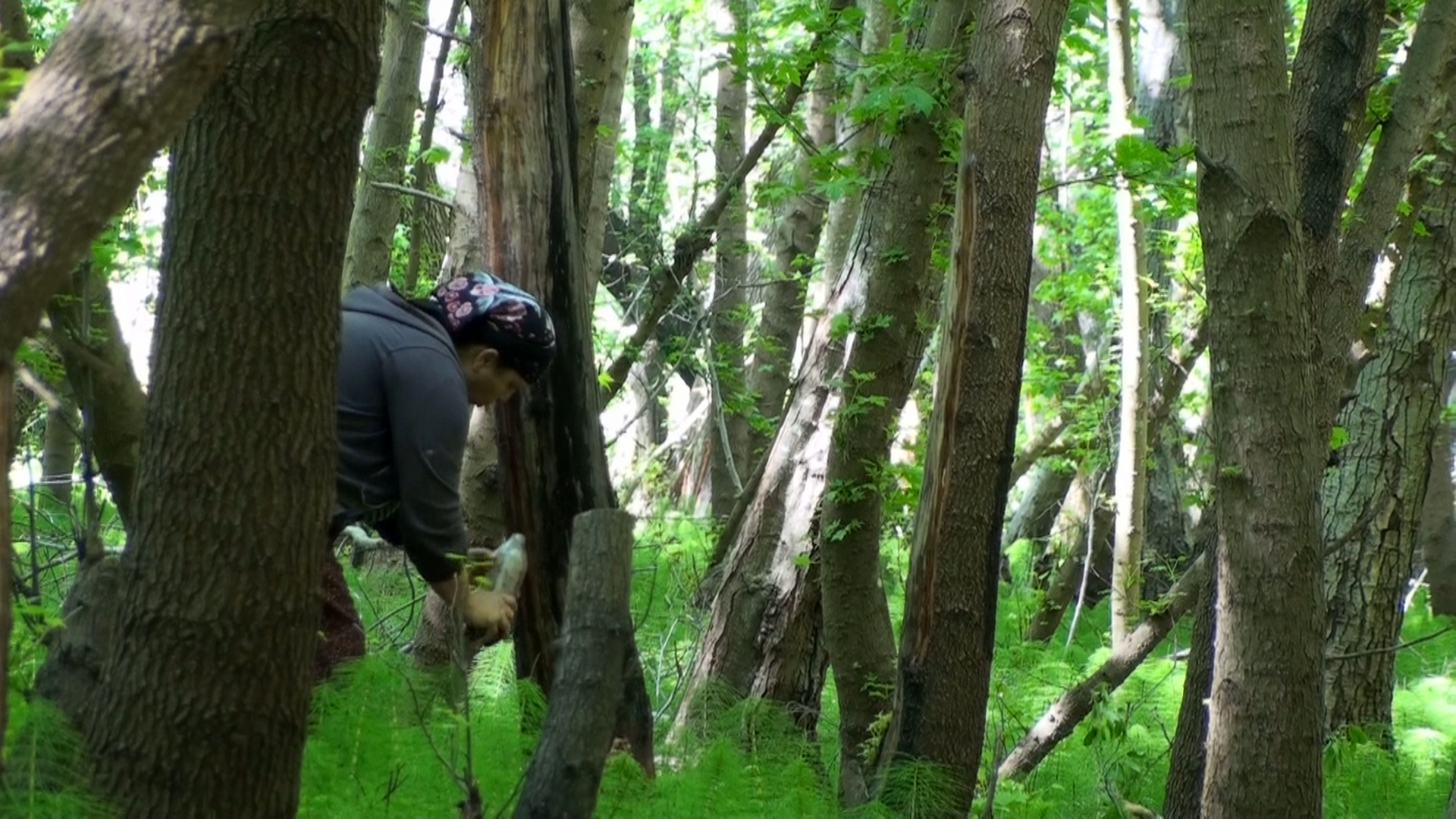
Local woman at Kavakarası collecting sap

In English, this oil is known under several names, shortly as storax to include all sweetgum oils, or as styrax Levant, styrax gum, Asiatic storax, balsam storax, liquid storax, Oriental sweetgum oil, or Turkish sweetgum oil. Diluted with a suitable carrier oil, it is used externally in traditional medicine. It is a different product from the benzoin resin produced from tropical trees in the genus Styrax.

The hydrocarbon styrene is named for Levant styrax from Liquidambar orientalis, from which it was first isolated, and not for the genus Styrax; industrially produced styrene is now used to produce polystyrene plastics, including Styrofoam.

== Conservation ==
The status of and developments regarding the protection of oriental sweetgum continue to occupy local and national environmental agenda at a critical level in Turkey. Among the main causes for the loss of sweetgum forests was the cutting and felling of trees for opening new fields for agriculture, as well as the construction of three separate dams at localities that precisely corresponded to important habitats for the species. On Rhodes, development and tourism activities are considered a threat to the species. As such, Liquidambar orientalis holds an important position in the region's biodiversity and is considered an endangered species.
