= Gökçeören, Osmangazi =

Village in Turkey

Gökçeören
- Neighbourhood
- Location in Turkey Gökçeören (Marmara)
- Coordinates: 40°08′51″N 28°59′29″E
- Country: Turkey
- Province: Bursa
- District: Osmangazi
- Population (2022): 236
- Time zone: UTC+3 (TRT)

Gökçeören (also: Gökçeviran) is a neighbourhood in the municipality and district of Osmangazi, Bursa Province in Turkey. Its population is 236 (2022).
