= Kolbasa =

Town of ancient Pisidia

Coordinates: 37°27′48″N 30°24′39″E

Kolbasa (or Colbasa) was a town of ancient Pisidia inhabited during Hellenistic, Roman and Byzantine times.

Under the name Colbasa, it became a bishopric and remains a titular see of the Roman Catholic Church.

Its site is located near Kuşbaba, in Asiatic Turkey.
