= Aksungur, Osmangazi =

Village in Turkey

Aksungur
- Neighbourhood
- Location in Turkey Aksungur (Marmara)
- Coordinates: 40.2935°N 28.9770°E
- Country: Turkey
- Province: Bursa
- District: Osmangazi
- Population (2022): 374
- Time zone: UTC+3 (TRT)

Aksungur is a neighbourhood in the municipality and district of Osmangazi, Bursa Province in Turkey. Its population is 374 (2022).
