= Mürseller, Osmangazi =

Village in Turkey

Mürseller
- Neighbourhood
- Country: Turkey
- Province: Bursa
- District: Osmangazi
- Population (2022): 271
- Time zone: UTC+3 (TRT)

Mürseller is a neighbourhood in the municipality and district of Osmangazi, Bursa Province in Turkey. Its population is 271 (2022).
