= Ahmetbey, Osmangazi =

Village in Turkey

Ahmetbey
- Neighbourhood
- Location in Turkey Ahmetbey (Marmara)
- Coordinates: 40.2934°N 28.9959°E
- Country: Turkey
- Province: Bursa
- District: Osmangazi
- Population (2022): 531
- Time zone: UTC+3 (TRT)

Ahmetbey is a neighbourhood in the municipality and district of Osmangazi, Bursa Province in Turkey. Its population is 531 (2022).
