= Seferışıklar, Osmangazi =

Village in Turkey

Seferışıklar
- Neighbourhood
- Location in Turkey Seferışıklar (Marmara)
- Coordinates: 40°00′19″N 29°04′55″E
- Country: Turkey
- Province: Bursa
- District: Osmangazi
- Population (2022): 137
- Time zone: UTC+3 (TRT)

Seferışıklar is a neighbourhood in the municipality and district of Osmangazi, Bursa Province in Turkey. Its population is 137 (2022).
