= Perminounda =

Ancient town

Coordinates: 37°19′39″N 30°26′48″E

Perminounda was a town of ancient Pisidia inhabited during Roman times. Its name does not occur among ancient authors, but is inferred from epigraphic and other evidence.

Its site is tentatively located near Kızılcaağaç, in Asiatic Turkey.
