= Taşyayla, Bucak =

Taşyayla
- Village
- Location in Turkey
- Coordinates: 37°31′05″N 30°39′27″E
- Country: Turkey
- Province: Burdur
- District: Bucak
- Population (2022): 531
- Time zone: UTC+3 (TRT)

Taşyayla is a village in the Bucak District of Burdur Province, Turkey. Its population is 560 (2021). It is 61 km from Burdur and 15 km from Bucak.

== Population ==
Historical population
Year	Pop.	±% p.a.
1985	803	—
1990	779	−0.61%
1997	757	−0.41%
2007	707	−0.68%
2012	650	−1.67%
2017	620	−0.94%
2022	531	−3.05%
Source: Population censuses (1985-1997) and TÜIK (2007-2022)
