= Keraia =

Keraia (Ancient Greek: κεραία, lit. 'horn'), is a Greek word that may refer to:

- Keraia (Crete), a town of ancient Crete
- Keraia (Pisidia), a town of ancient Pisidia
- Keraia (diacritic) (ʹ), a diacritic used in Greek writing
