= Yüreğil =

Yüreğil may refer to the following places in Turkey:

- Yüreğil, Bucak
- Yüreğil, Dazkırı, a village in the district of Dazkırı, Afyonkarahisar Province
- Yüreğil, Emirdağ, a village in the district of Emirdağ, Afyonkarahisar Province
