= Bursa Sports High School =

Location
- Veysel Karani Mah., Sevgi Cad. Osmangazi, Bursa; Turkey
- Coordinates: 40°12′23″N 29°05′10″E

Information
- Type: Government-funded co-educational comprehensive and specialist secondary
- Established: 2006; 19 years ago
- School district: Bursa Province
- Educational authority: Ministry of National Education
- Specialist: Sports school
- Years: 9-12
- Affiliation: BTSO, Celal Sönmez
- Website: bursasporlisesi.meb.k12.tr/%20Official

Bursa Sports High School (Turkish: Bursa Spor Lisesi), full name Bursa BTSO Celal Sönmez Spor Lisesi (BTSO is for Bursa Commerce and Industry Chamber), is a government-funded co-educational comprehensive and specialist secondary school, with speciality in sports, located in Osmangazi district of Bursa Province, Turkey. The high school has been serving in this status since 2006.

== Description ==
The school has three indoor sport halls. The school teachers are expert in their fields and have achieved degrees in their background.

According to a protocol signed by the Ministry of National Education and the Ministry of Youth and Sports, the students may use all the sports facilities belonging to the ministry in the city.

Admission to the school is determined by 30% of middle school success score and 70% sportive talent of the candidates, who have to pass tests in four sports branches.

The students participate at internayiona high school sports competitions with success. A number of students play in the farm team of the local football club Bursaspor. Many students performing individual sports such as athletics, boxing, judo, karate, taekwondo and wrestling, are very successful and member of the national teams.
