= Karaaliler =

Karaaliler may refer to:

- Karaaliler, Bucak
- Karaaliler, Göynük
