= Veled-i Yaniç Mosque =

Mosque in Bursa, Turkey

- Veled-i Yaniç Camii
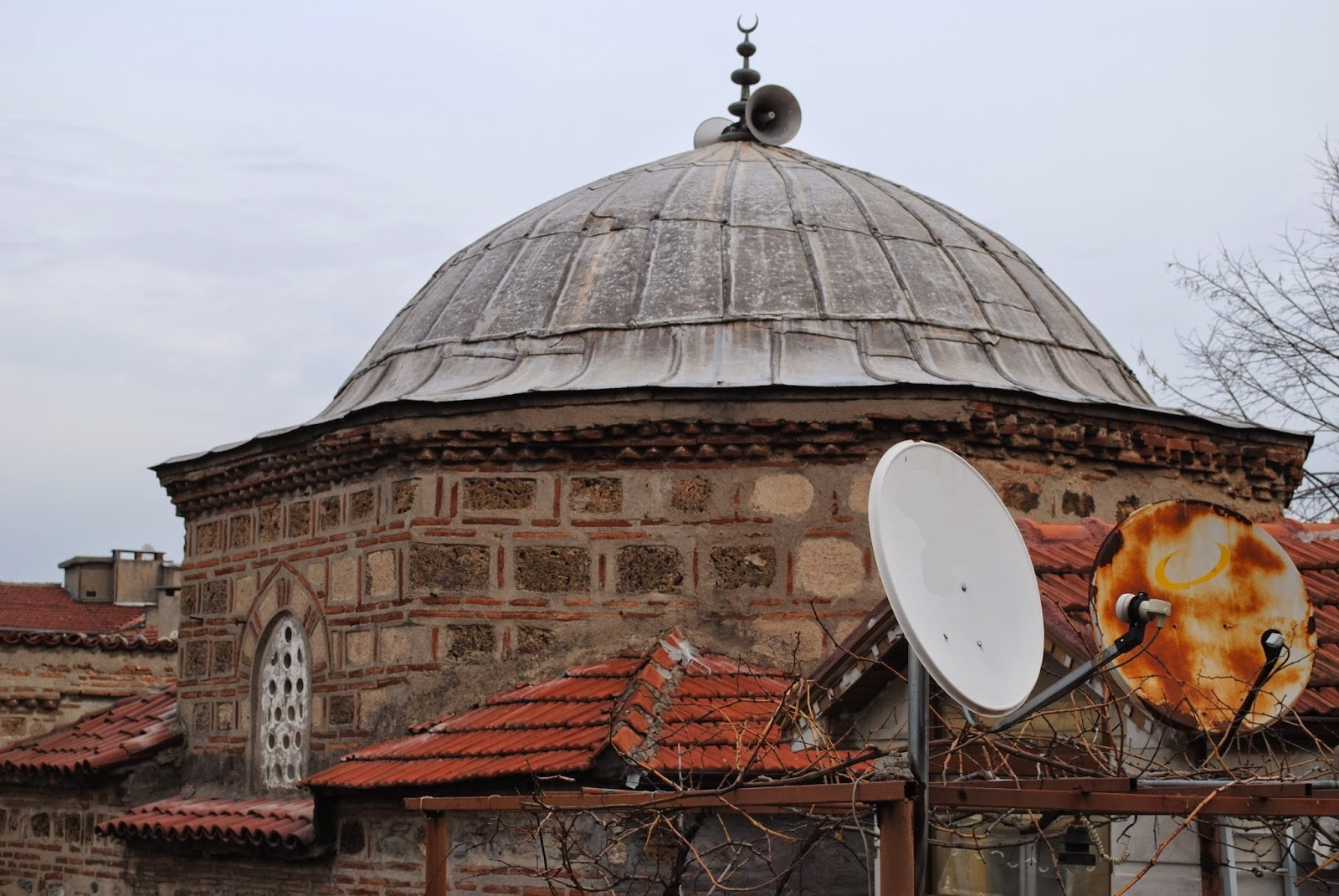
- The dome of the mosque

- Location within Marmara Location within Turkey

Religion
- Affiliation: Islam
- District: Osmangazi, Hisar
- Region: Marmara

Location
- Location: Bursa, Turkey
- Coordinates: 40.185°N 29.05642°E

Architecture
- Type: Early Ottoman
- Style: Ottoman
- Completed: 1440; 586 years ago

Specifications
- Length: 6.48 m (21.3 ft)
- Width: 6.76 m (22.2 ft)

Veled-i Yaniç Mosque (Turkish: Veled-i Yaniç Camiii) is an Ottoman mosque with the type of early Ottoman architecture. The mosque is located in Bursa, Turkey and it is still in use. According to the inscription, which is above the entering door, it is known that this mosque was built at the July 1440 by Mahmud Çelebi. The mosque is categorized under the title of early Ottoman architecture.

The square planned mesjid is covered with an octagonal-shaped dome. The mosque has an interesting minaret, which was suspected to be a church bell. In fact, there are no example this type of minaret in the mosque architecture. But this question has not been answered yet. The Minaret, which can be climbed by five stairs, is located circa 10 meter outside of the mosque and is placed over the fountain right across of the entrance.

Veled-i Yaniç was a Sufi whose real name was Mahmut. His father was Hadji Hayruddin, the son of Yaniç. He worked under state service during the reigns of Murad Hudavendigar the first and Yıldırım Bayezid. He was one of the commanders of the Ottoman state, he also combated in the Battle of Ankara. He died probably in the 1450s. He is buried in the courtyard of the mosque which is known by his name.

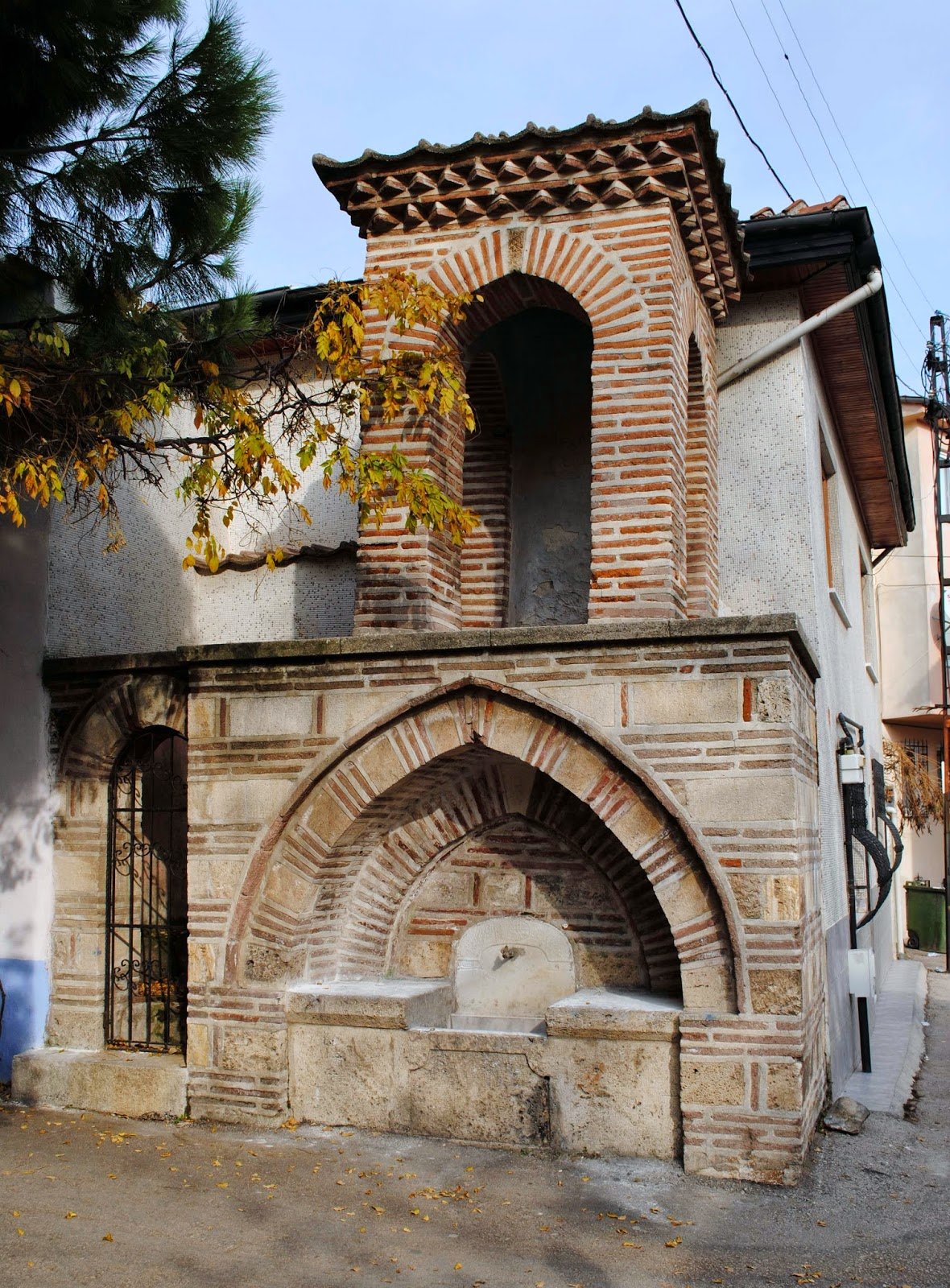
The Minaret of the Veled-i Yaniç Mosque
