= Beşkonak =

Beşkonak (literally "five mansions " or "five inns" in Turkish) may refer to the following places in Turkey:

- Beşkonak, Bucak
- Beşkonak, Gerede, a village in the district of Gerede, Bolu Province
- Beşkonak, Kozluk, a village in the district of Kozluk, Batman Province
- Beşkonak, Kızılcahamam, a village in the district of Kızılcahamam, Ankara Province
