= Bağlı, Osmangazi =

Village in Turkey

Bağlı
- Neighbourhood
- Location in Turkey Bağlı (Marmara)
- Coordinates: 40.0672°N 29.0913°E
- Country: Turkey
- Province: Bursa
- District: Osmangazi
- Population (2022): 396
- Time zone: UTC+3 (TRT)

Bağlı is a neighbourhood in the municipality and district of Osmangazi, Bursa Province in Turkey. Its population is 396 (2022).
