= Çobanpınarı =

Çobanpınarı (literally "shepherd spring") is a Turkish place name that may refer to the following places in Turkey:

- Çobanpınarı, Bucak
- Çobanpınarı, Gerger, a village in the district of Gerger, Adıyaman Province
- Çobanpınarı, Kozan, a village in the district of Kozan, Adana Province
