= Bursa Atatürk Museum =

- Bursa Atatürk Evi Müzesi
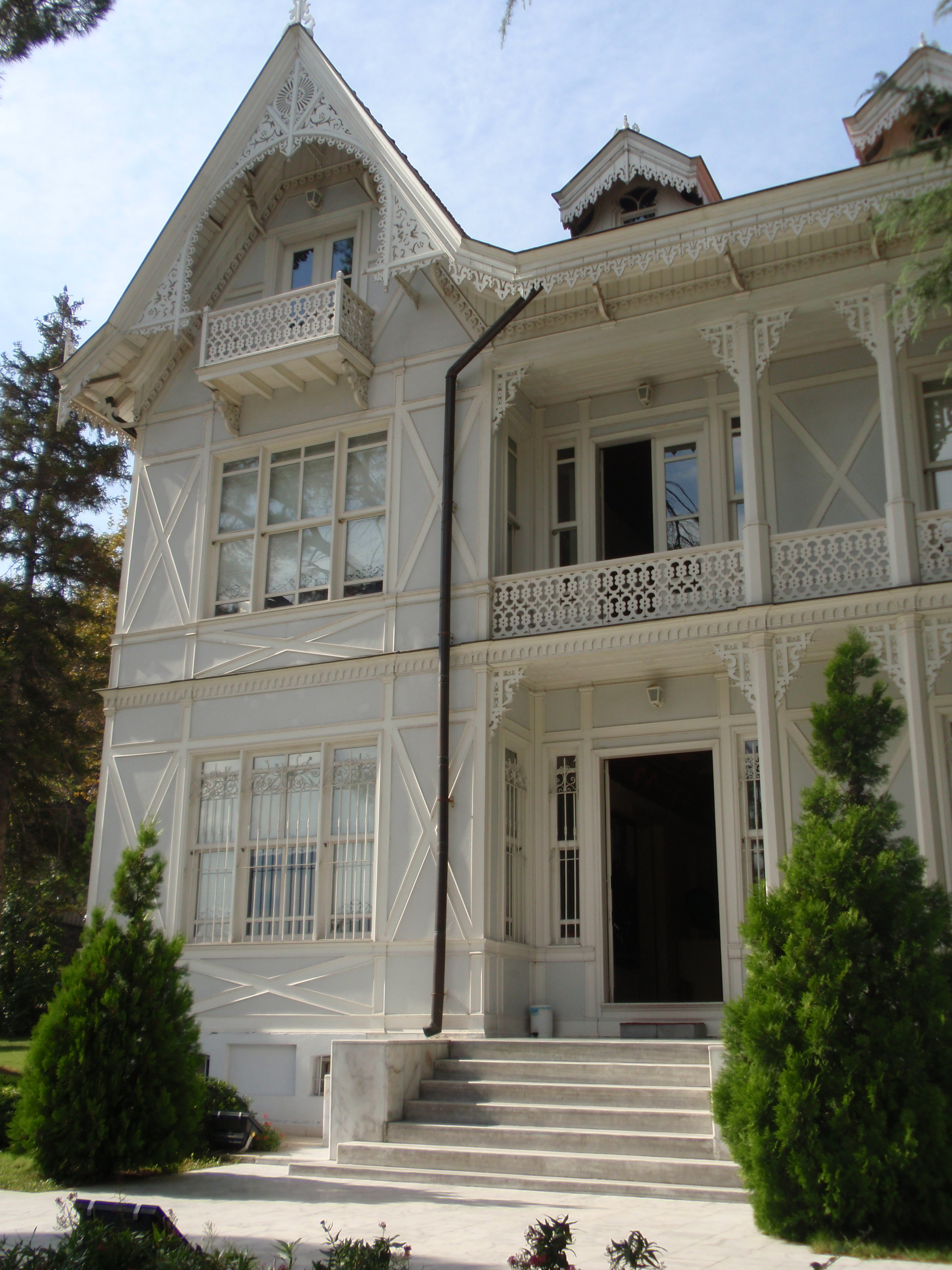

- Bursa Atatürk Museum
- Established: 1973; 53 years ago
- Location: Çekirge Cad., Osmangazi, Bursa Turkey
- Coordinates: 40°11′42″N 29°02′24″E
- Type: Historic house museum

Bursa Atatürk Museum (Turkish: Bursa Atatürk Evi Müzesi) is a historic house museum in Bursa, Turkey.

The museum is at 40°11′42″N 29°02′24″E at Çekirge quarter of Osmangazi district in Bursa Province.

The museum is a three-storey house. It was probably built towards the end of the 19th century. When Atatürk, the founder of Turkey, visited Bursa on 20 January 1923 (after the Turkish War of Independence and before the proclamation of the Republic) he stayed in this house which was recently bought by the municipality of Bursa from its former owner Miralay ("colonel") Mehmet Bey. During the next ten visits Atatürk stayed in this house, the last one being on 1 February 1938 during his illness. Total time Atatürk spent in this house is 2 months and 20 days. After Atatürk's death the house was handed over to the management of Çelik Palas, the biggest hotel in Bursa which was next to the house. But in 1965, it was bought by the Ministry of National Education . In 1973 it was opened as Atatürk's house. In the ground floor there are photos of Atatürk. Atatürk's office as well as the bedroom and the bathroom are in the upper floor. The uppermost floor is a guesthouse.
