= Bursa Agriculture Vocational High School =

- Hamidiye Mesleki ve Teknik Anadolu Lisesi
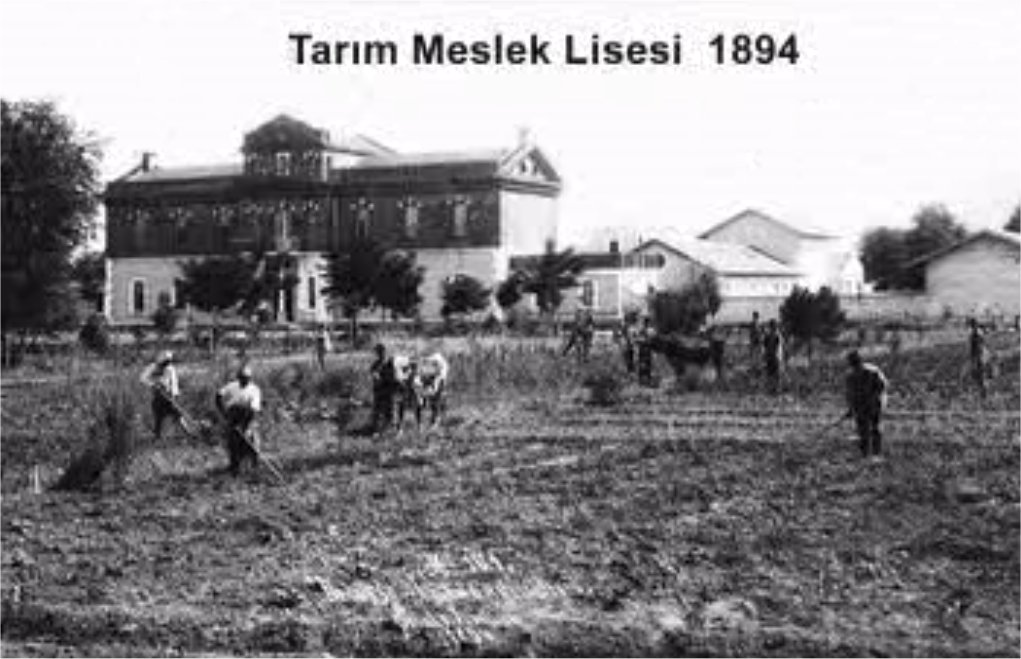
- Bursa Agriculture Vocational High School (1894)

Location
- Osmangazi, Bursa; Turkey
- 40.22787°N 28.99838°E

Information
- Type: Vocational school
- Established: 21 March 1891; 135 years ago
- Founder: Abdul Hamid II

Bursa Agriculture Vocational High School (Turkish: Tarım Meslek Lisesi - Bursa), also known as Hamidiye Vocational and Technical Anatolian High School ("Hamidiye Mesleki ve Teknik Anadolu Lisesi") is a vocational high school for agriculture in Bursa, Turkey. It was established during the Ottoman Empire in 1891.

== Location ==
The high school is located at Hürriyet St. 122 in Adalet neighborhood of Osmangazi district in Bursa.

== History ==
Initiated by Mahmut Celalettin Pasha, the Governor of Bursa, the school was commissioned by Ottoman Sultan Abdul Hamid II (r. 1876–1909). The construction of the school building on a land stretching over 260 ha (640 acres) began in 1885. The school land passed to the state after it was expropriated from Topal Mehmet Agha of Hamitler village because he could not pay the tithe to the government. The land was used for the building of the school as it could not be sold to a determined value. Named "Theoretical and Practical Hüdavendigâr Hamidiye Agriculture School" (Ottoman Turkish: Nazari ve Ameli Hüdavendigar Hamidiye Ziraat Mektebi), the school opened on 21 March 1891. In the beginning, twenty students started education, and around fifteen students graduated from the school every year for many years.

The school was closed during World War I and reopened in 1924 after the foundation of the Republic in 1923. Between 1924 and 1930, primary school graduates were registered to the school. After 1930, secondary school graduates from farmer families only were registered for the education period of three years. After 1949, the school, in the form of a Regional Agricultural School, also introduced the farmers in the region to modern farming techniques with the "Adult Farmer Courses". It became so one of the most important breakthroughs of Turkish agriculture after 1950.

In 1967, its name was changed to "Agricultural Vocational School" ("Ziraat Meslek Okulu"). The number of graduates as agricultural technician were about 450 during the Ottoman Empire period. Close to 4,500 graduates were in the agriculture and food industry in the Republican period.

The three buildings in the campus are registered as historical. In 2015, the school was renamed to "Hamidiye Vocational and Technical Anatolian High School" (Turkish: Hamidiye Mesleki ve Teknik Anadolu Lisesi). A project for the restoration of the school buildings was started in 2020.

== High school vocational education ==
The high school gives education in the fields of agriculture, food technology, food and beverage service, animal husbandry, animal health and additionally gives laboratory service. As of the 202-21 school term, there were 550 students in the high school. The students are mostly children of farmer families of the Marmara Region. The graduates receive the title "agricultural technician", and work as an "expert agronomist". On the nearly 25 ha (62 acres) land in the high school campus, agricultural activities are made. There are four greenhouses in the landscape. In terms of seedlings, crop production is possible in four seasons due to the fertile soil of Bursa. The products obtained here are sent all over The country. The students receive training in cattle breeding for dairy farming and meat production, and animal health.

The school cooperates with the private sector through the revolving fund, and the students accompany the teachers to the production activities at the school.
