= Bucak District =

District of Burdur Province, Turkey

- District
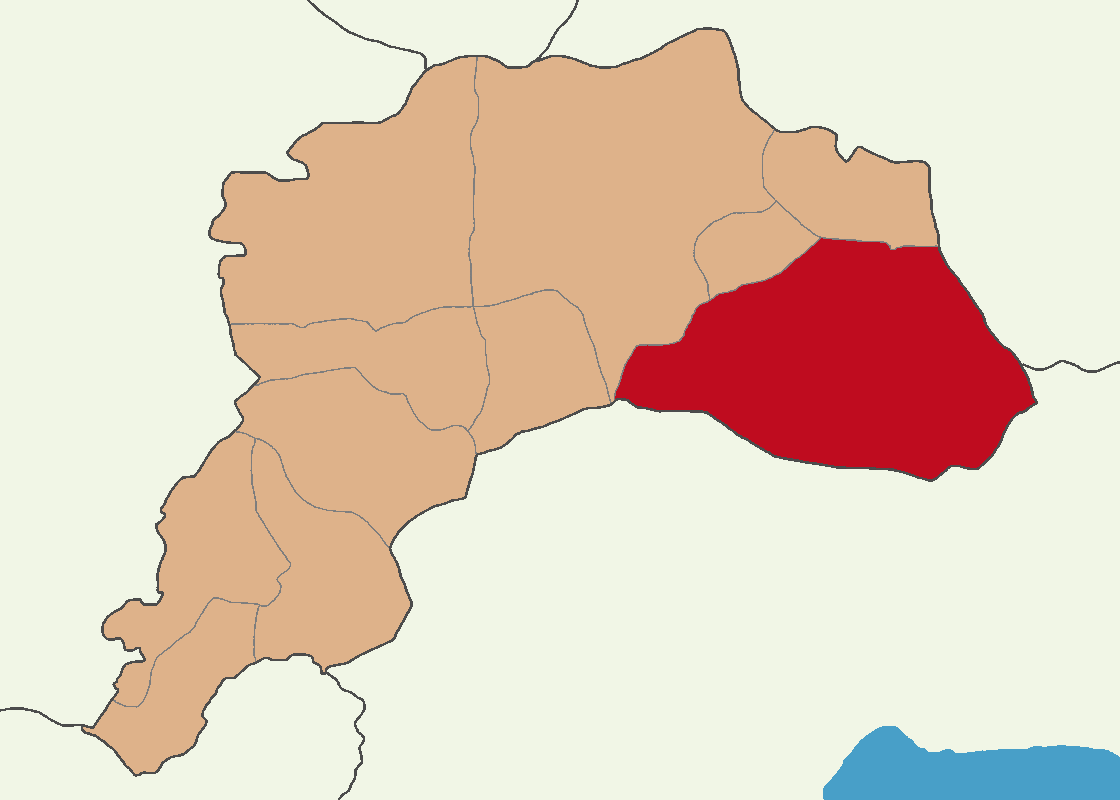
- Map showing Bucak District in Burdur Province

- Location in Turkey
- Coordinates: 37°28′N 30°36′E
- Country: Turkey
- Province: Burdur
- Seat: Bucak

Government
  - Kaymakam: Erol Tanrıkulu
- Area: 1,511 km^{2} (583 sq mi)
- Population (2021): 66,156
  - Density: 44/km^{2} (110/sq mi)
- Time zone: UTC+3 (TRT)
- Website: www.bucak.gov.tr

Bucak District is a district of the Burdur Province of Turkey. Its seat is the town of Bucak. Its area is 1,511 km^{2}, and its population is 66,156 (2021).

== Composition ==
There are three municipalities in Bucak District:

- Bucak
- Kızılkaya
- Kocaaliler

There are 35 villages in Bucak District:

- Alkaya
- Anbahan
- Avdancık
- Belören
- Beşkonak
- Boğazköy
- Çamlık
- Çobanpınarı
- Dağarcık
- Dutalanı
- Elsazı
- Gündoğdu
- İncirdere
- Karaaliler
- Karacaören
- Karaot
- Karapınar
- Karaseki
- Kargı
- Kavacık
- Kayı
- Keçili
- Kestel
- Kızılcaağaç
- Kızıllı
- Kızılseki
- Kuşbaba
- Kuyubaşı
- Seydiköy
- Susuz
- Taşyayla
- Uğurlu
- Ürkütlü
- Üzümlübel
- Yüreğil
