= Bursa Forestry Museum =

Museum in Bursa, Turkey

- Bursa Ormancılık Müzesi
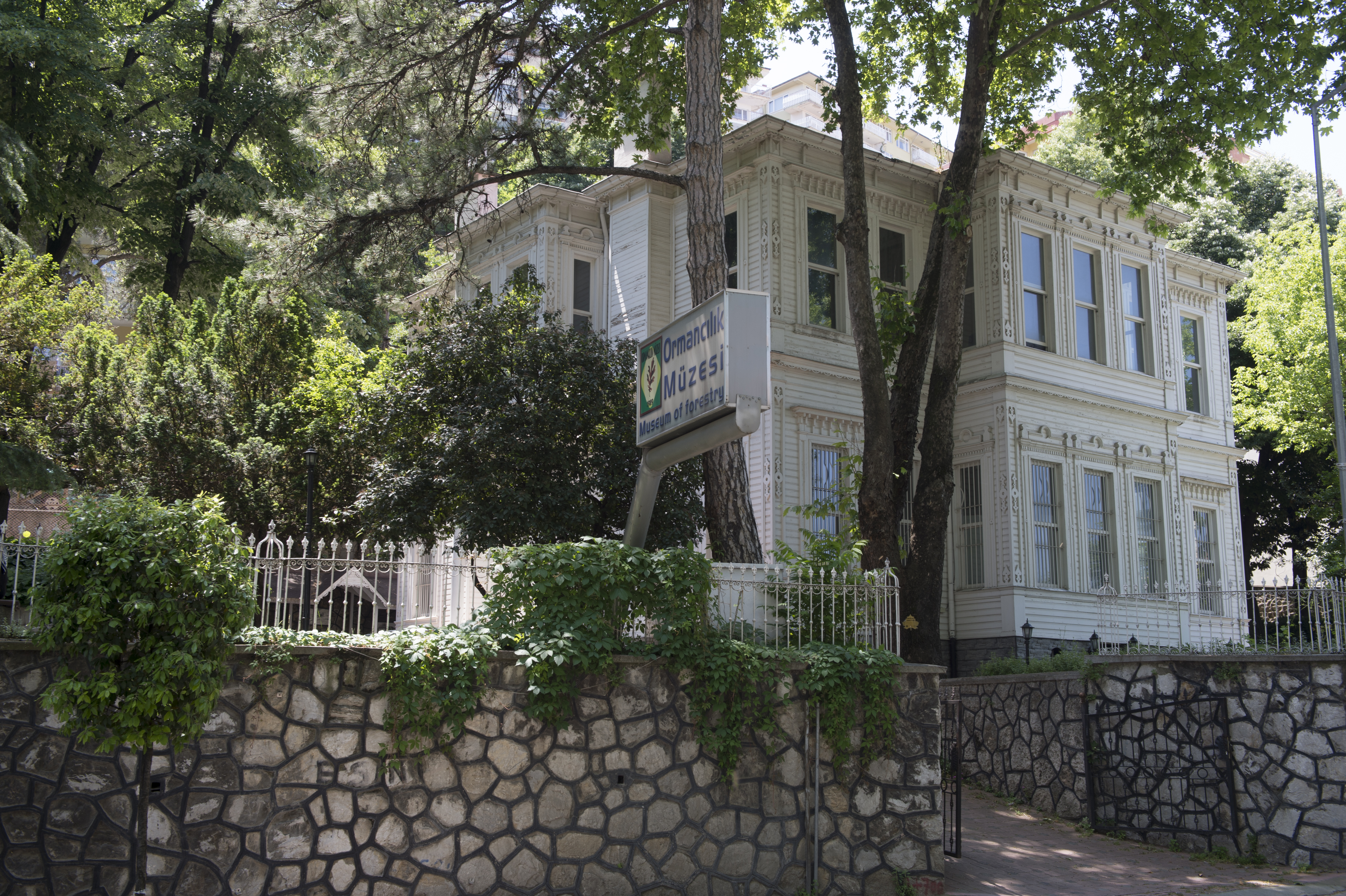
- Bursa Forestry Museum

- Location within Marmara
- Established: 29 March 1989
- Location: Çekirge St., Osmangazi, Bursa, Turkey
- Coordinates: 40.199900°N 29.032928°E
- Type: Forestry

Bursa Forestry Museum (Turkish: Bursa Ormancılık Müzesi) is a museum in Bursa, northwestern Turkey dedicated to forestry. Opened in 1989, it is housed in a historic Ottoman era mansion. Its collection size is nearly 1,000 items.

== Museum building ==
The Forestry Museum is situated at Çekirge Street of Çekirge quarter in Osmangazi, Bursa, northwestern Turkey, in an Ottoman Baroquearchitectural style 19th-century building with a garden, which is called the "Saatçi Mansion". The building was initially used as a residence. Between 1939 and 1949, it housed Bursa Forestry School ("Bursa Orman Okulu"). It served until 1983 as the office of the Forestry Regional Directorate ("Bölge Orman Müdürlüğü"). Following arrangements in 1989, it was converted into museum building. On 29 March 1989, the museum was opened.

== Exhibits ==
The museum is the first and the only museum of forestry in Turkey. It exhibits nearly 1,000 items. The sections of the museum are forest life, vegetation fossils, forest vegetation and logging tools, forestry tools and equipment, historical documents and records, maps and space photographs as well as intra-forest telecommunications equipment. The museum features also an "Atatürk Corner" and a library.

In the forest life section, taxidermy mounts of various animals from many national parks in Turkey and a rich insect collection are on display. The fossil collection in the museum is also very rich. Fossils of flora, which are still existing today, can be seen. A notable exhibit is the fossil of a six-million year old Sequoia tree, of which woody characteristics are preserved. Another interesting exhibit is the stem cross-section of a 700-year old Scots pine from Borçka, Artvin, northeastern Turkey. It exhibits ethnographic items in addition to historical and current wood branding toola.

Forestry Museum is open every day from 9:00 to 17:00 hours local time, but closed on Sundays and Mondays.
