= Keraia (Pisidia) =

Town of ancient Pisidia

Coordinates: 37°30′52″N 30°36′14″E

Keraia was a town of ancient Pisidia inhabited during Hellenistic and Roman times. Its name does not occur among ancient authors, but is inferred from epigraphic and other evidence.

Its site is located near Çere, Belören, in Asiatic Turkey.
