= Alkaya, Bucak =

Village in Turkey

Alkaya
- Village
- Location in Turkey
- Coordinates: 37.5280°N 30.5603°E
- Country: Turkey
- Province: Burdur
- District: Bucak
- Population (2021): 160
- Time zone: UTC+3 (TRT)

Alkaya is a village in the Bucak District of Burdur Province in Turkey. Its population is 160 (2021).
