= Kayı, Bucak =

Village in Turkey

Kayı
- Village
- Location in Turkey
- Coordinates: 37°18′22″N 30°42′37″E
- Country: Turkey
- Province: Burdur
- District: Bucak
- Population (2021): 499
- Time zone: UTC+3 (TRT)

Kayı (formerly: Demirli) is a village in the Bucak District of Burdur Province in Turkey. Its population is 499 (2021).
