= Kocaaliler =

- Municipality
- Location in Turkey
- Coordinates: 37°19′N 30°44′E
- Country: Turkey
- Province: Burdur
- District: Bucak
- Elevation: 630 m (2,070 ft)
- Population (2021): 2,339
- Time zone: UTC+3 (TRT)
- Postal code: 15325
- Area code: 0248

Kocaaliler is a town (belde) in the Bucak District, Burdur Province, Turkey. Its population is 2,339 (2021). It is situated to the west of Karacaören dam reservoir and state highway D.685. The distance to Bucak was 25 kilometres (16 mi). Most pronounced crop of the town is fig and an annual fig festival is held in the town.
