= Kavacık, Bucak =

Village in Turkey

Kavacık
- Village
- Country: Turkey
- Province: Burdur
- District: Bucak
- Population (2021): 213
- Time zone: UTC+3 (TRT)

Kavacık is a village in the Bucak District of Burdur Province in Turkey. Its population is 213 (2021).
