= Boğazköy, Bucak =

Village in Turkey

Boğazköy
- Village
- Location in Turkey
- Coordinates: 37.2669°N 30.5015°E
- Country: Turkey
- Province: Burdur
- District: Bucak
- Population (2021): 417
- Time zone: UTC+3 (TRT)

Boğazköy is a village in the Bucak District of Burdur Province in Turkey. Its population is 417 (2021).
