= Uğurlu, Bucak =

Village in Turkey

Uğurlu
- Village
- Location in Turkey
- Coordinates: 37°19′05″N 30°29′18″E
- Country: Turkey
- Province: Burdur
- District: Bucak
- Population (2021): 371
- Time zone: UTC+3 (TRT)

Uğurlu is a village in the Bucak District of Burdur Province in Turkey. Its population is 371 (2021).
