= Kargı, Bucak =

Village in Turkey

Kargı
- Village
- Location in Turkey
- Coordinates: 37°17′28″N 30°48′39″E
- Country: Turkey
- Province: Burdur
- District: Bucak
- Population (2021): 441
- Time zone: UTC+3 (TRT)

Kargı is a village in the Bucak District of Burdur Province in Turkey. Its population is 441 (2021).
