= Çamlık, Bucak =

Çamlık
- Village
- Location in Turkey
- Coordinates: 37°29′31″N 30°42′6″E
- Country: Turkey
- Province: Burdur
- District: Bucak
- Population (2021): 1,311
- Time zone: UTC+3 (TRT)

Çamlık is a village in the Bucak District of Burdur Province in Turkey. Its population is 1,311 (2021). Before the 2013 reorganisation, it was a town (belde).
