= Kızılseki, Bucak =

Village in Turkey

Kızılseki
- Village
- Country: Turkey
- Province: Burdur
- District: Bucak
- Population (2021): 401
- Time zone: UTC+3 (TRT)

Kızılseki is a village in the Bucak District of Burdur Province in Turkey. Its population is 401 (2021).
