= Kızılkaya, Burdur =

Town in the Burdur Province, Turkey

Kızılkaya
- Municipality
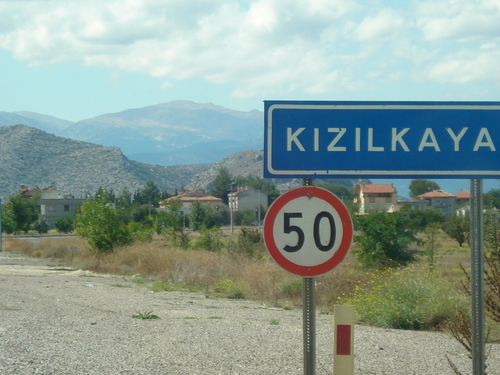
- Kızılkaya, Burdur

- Location within Turkey
- Coordinates: 37°18′N 30°27′E
- Country: Turkey
- Province: Burdur
- District: Bucak
- Elevation: 800 m (2,600 ft)
- Population (2021): 3,154
- Time zone: UTC+3 (TRT)
- Postal code: 15310
- Area code: 0248

Kızılkaya is a town (belde) in the Bucak District, Burdur Province, Turkey. Its population is 3,154 (2021). The distance to Bucak is 37 kilometres (23 mi) and to Burdur is 77 kilometres (48 mi).

== History ==
The former name of the settlement was Pazaravdan. The town was inhabited during the late Hittite era. During the Ottoman Empire era it was a district of Antalya Province to the south. It was declared a seat of township in 1973.
