= French Church (Bursa) =

Church in Bursa, Turkey

Coordinates: 40°10′50″N 29°03′58″E

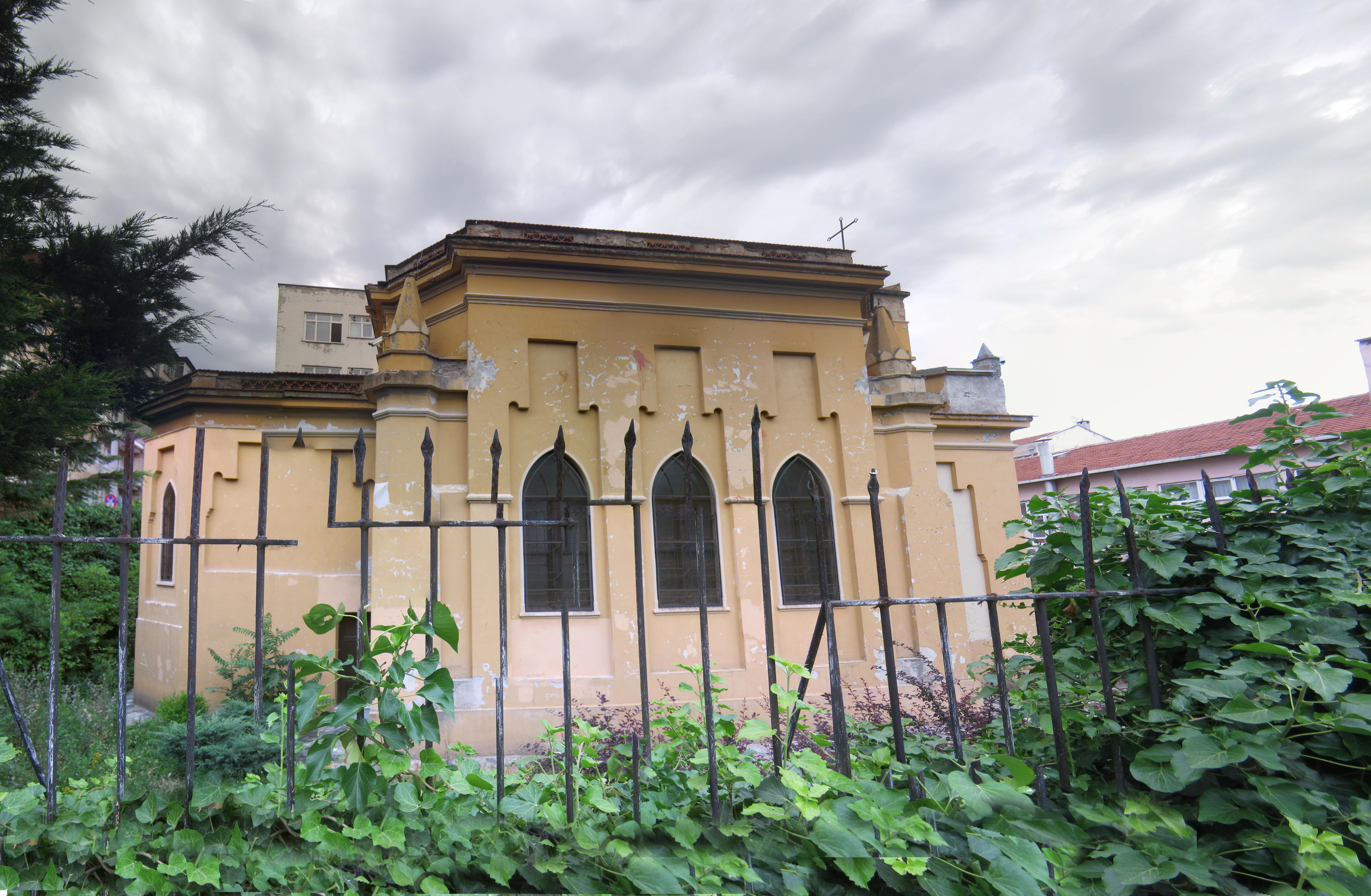
The deliberately ruined church now

The historic Protestant Church or Santa Maria French Church (now in Turkish: Fransız Kilisesi Kültür Evi) is the last active church in the city of Bursa (Prousa in Greek), Turkey; it was built prior to the 1880s by the city's Levantine community, at a time when what is now Turkey's fourth-largest city still had a predominantly Christian population. After the region's local Christians were wiped out following the Armenian Genocide and the forced expulsion of indigenous Greeks with the Greek Genocide after 1923, the Turkish state ultimately decided to evict the Christian congregation and close the church in 2016.

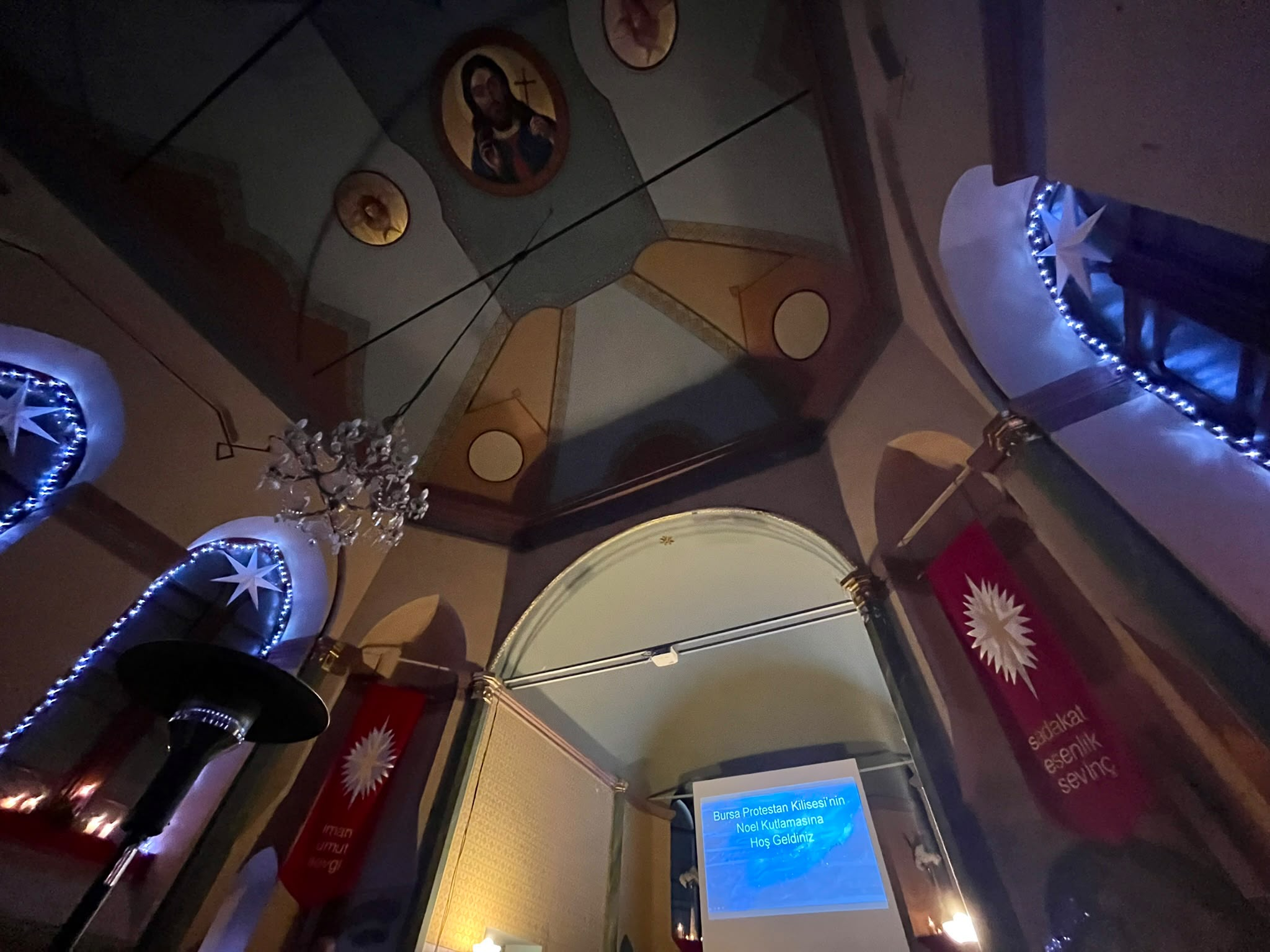
Beautiful historic interior of the Protestant Church

The Protestant church is located in the Osmangazi district and was built with a single-nave layout. Its exterior features towers, while the main building has pointed-arch windows. The church had previously been closed in 1960 and was even used as a warehouse for a time. However, between 2002 and 2004, the church was restored and made available to Bursa's few remaining Christians for worship services. Unlike the Muslim community, the Protestant congregation receives no financial support from the officially secular state; consequently, the congregation had to establish a "business entity" in order to be permitted to use the church. Due to a lack of facilities for the vulnerable Christian minority, the church must be shared with three other denominations, including the city's German, Catholic, and Orthodox communities. The church's Protestant pastor is Ismail Kulacoglu.

The usage agreement for the church expired in 2015, and the Directorate General of Foundations (Vakiflar Genel Müdürlügü), which administers the property, demanded that the Christian community immediately establish a "business entity". Although this was reportedly done in accordance with the instructions of Pastor Kulacoglu, in 2016 the state demanded by the Christian minority—via a telephone call made without warning or written notice—the evacuation of the church and, consequently, its immediate handover.

== Sources ==
- "Bursa Kilisesi: Ana Sayfa". Bursa Protestan Kilisesi (in Turkish).
