= Elsazı, Bucak =

Village in Turkey

Elsazı
- Village
- Location in Turkey
- Coordinates: 37°27′N 30°49′E
- Country: Turkey
- Province: Burdur
- District: Bucak
- Population (2021): 584
- Time zone: UTC+3 (TRT)

Elsazı is a village in the Bucak District of Burdur Province in Turkey. Its population is 584 (2021).
