= Üzümlübel, Bucak =

Village in Turkey

Üzümlübel
- Village
- Location in Turkey
- Coordinates: 37°26′N 30°28′E
- Country: Turkey
- Province: Burdur
- District: Bucak
- Population (2021): 185
- Time zone: UTC+3 (TRT)

Üzümlübel is a village in the Bucak District of Burdur Province in Turkey. Its population is 185 (2021).
