= Cremna =

Ancient city in Pisidia, Asia Minor

Coordinates: 37°30′00.50″N 30°41′27.96″E

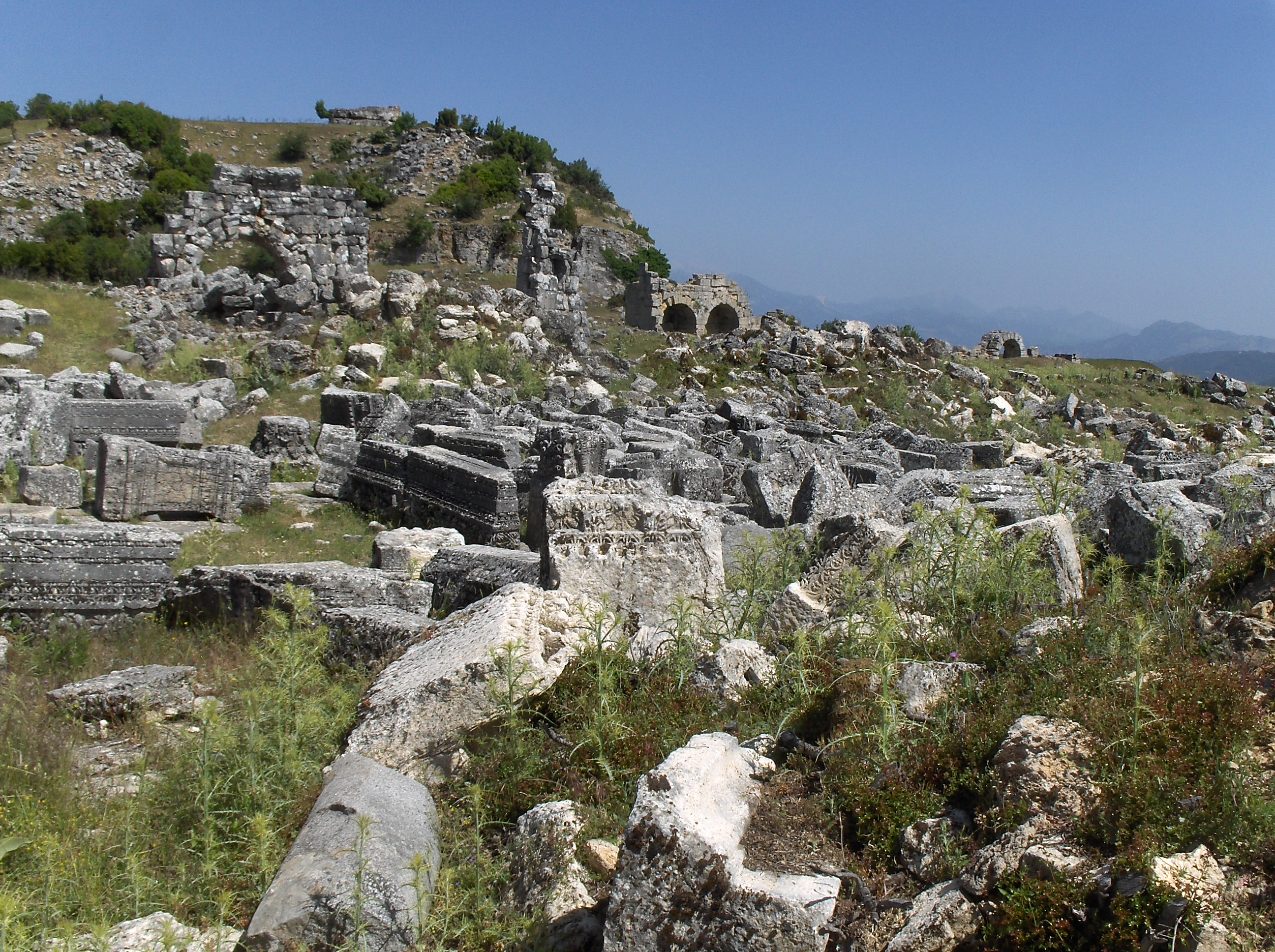
Site of Kremna

Cremna or Kremna (Ancient Greek: Κρῆμνα), was an ancient town in Pisidia. It is situated in the district of Bucak. It stands in a remote valley on a high plateau dominating the ancient Cestrus River (today Aksu), with limited access and good defensive features.

It was first taken by Amyntas, commander of the Galatian auxiliary army of Brutus and Cassius, who became king of Galatia and Pisidia on going over to the side of Mark Antony. Octavian allowed him to remain king until his death in 25 BC. After this, it became a Roman colony, as Strabo says; and there are imperial coins with the epigraph COL. IVL. AVG. CREMNA, which stands for Colonia Iulia Augusta [Felix] Cremnena. Its first coins appear to have been minted under Hadrian. Ptolemy mentions the Cremna Colonia, and according to him it is in the same longitude as Sagalassus.

Its water supply posed particular problems and the aqueduct had to include complex and novel solutions.

The donatio given by the emperor Aurelian (270–275) promised a period of great prosperity for Cremna; but in 276, the town was taken by an Isaurian robber, named Lydius, who used it as a base for looting the region, giving rise to the only visit of a Roman Emperor to the region, that of Marcus Claudius Tacitus. Later, the town was inserted in the Roman province of Pamphylia Secunda. The name of only one of its bishops is known: Theodorus, present at the Second Council of Nicaea in 787. No longer a residential bishopric, Cremna is today listed by the Catholic Church as a titular see.

At some time in the high Middle Ages, the ancient site of the town was abandoned, the population transferring itself to the present village of Çamlık.

The ancient site was identified in 1874 and excavations began in 1970.

== Gallery ==
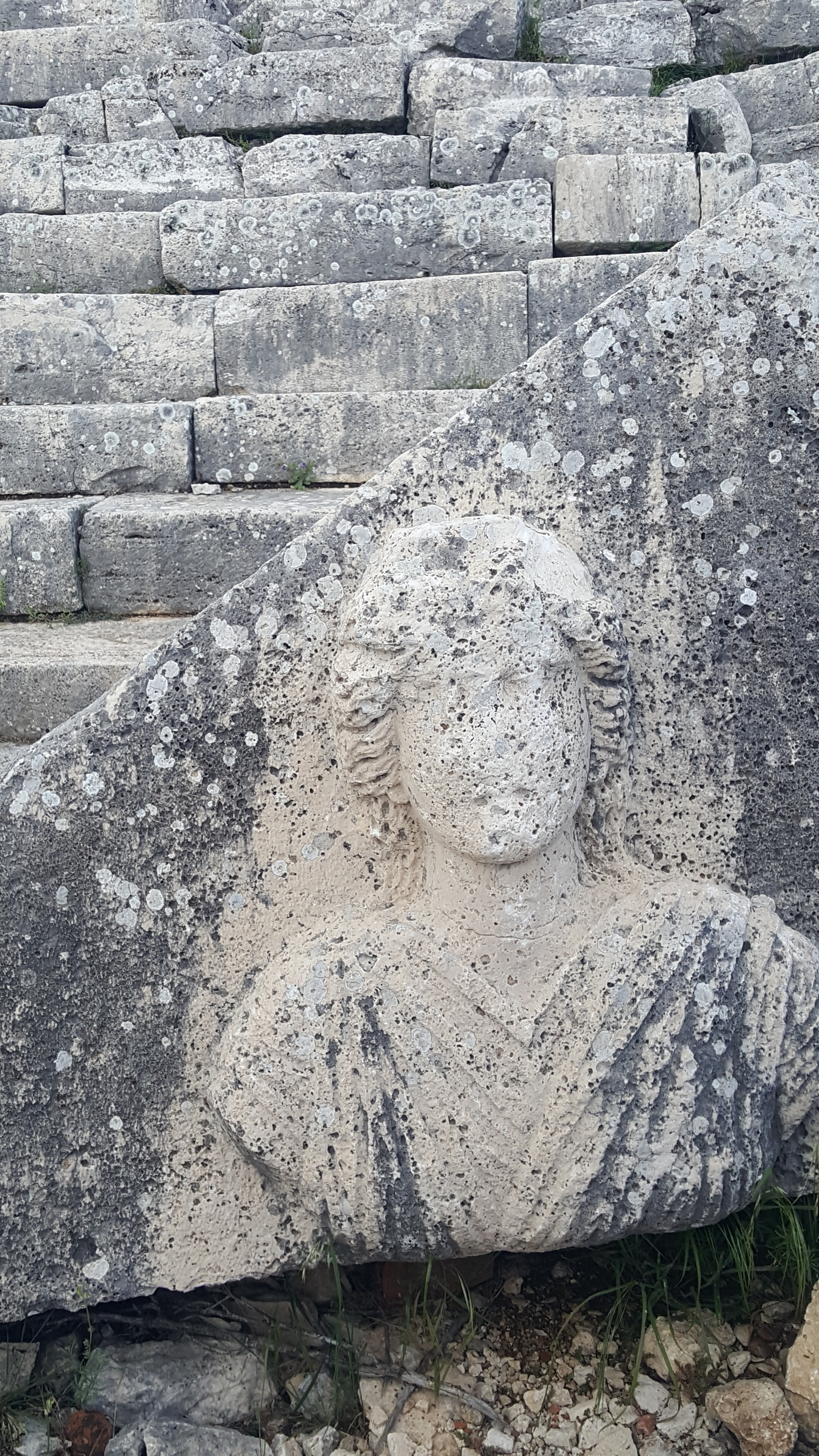

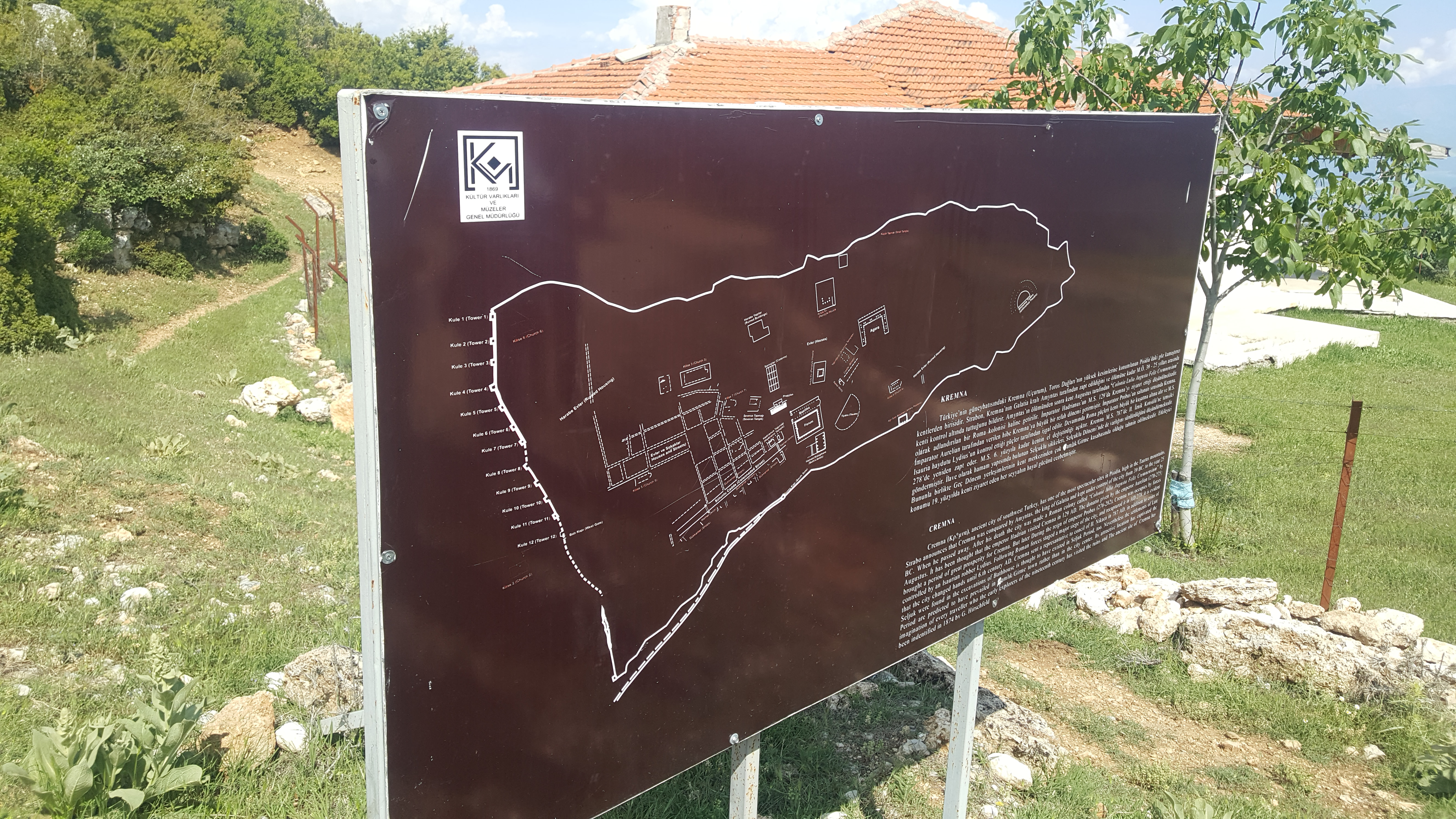

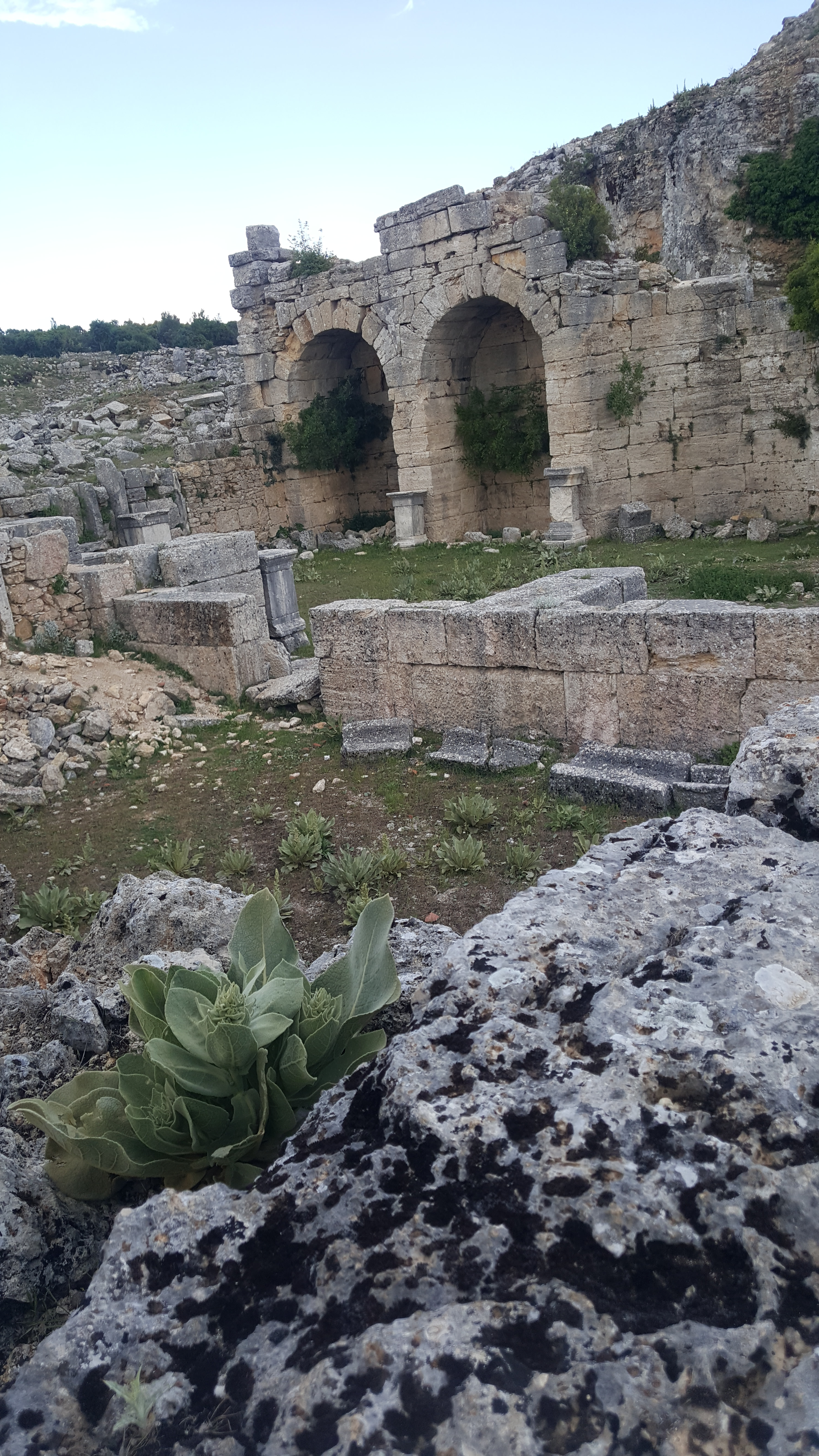

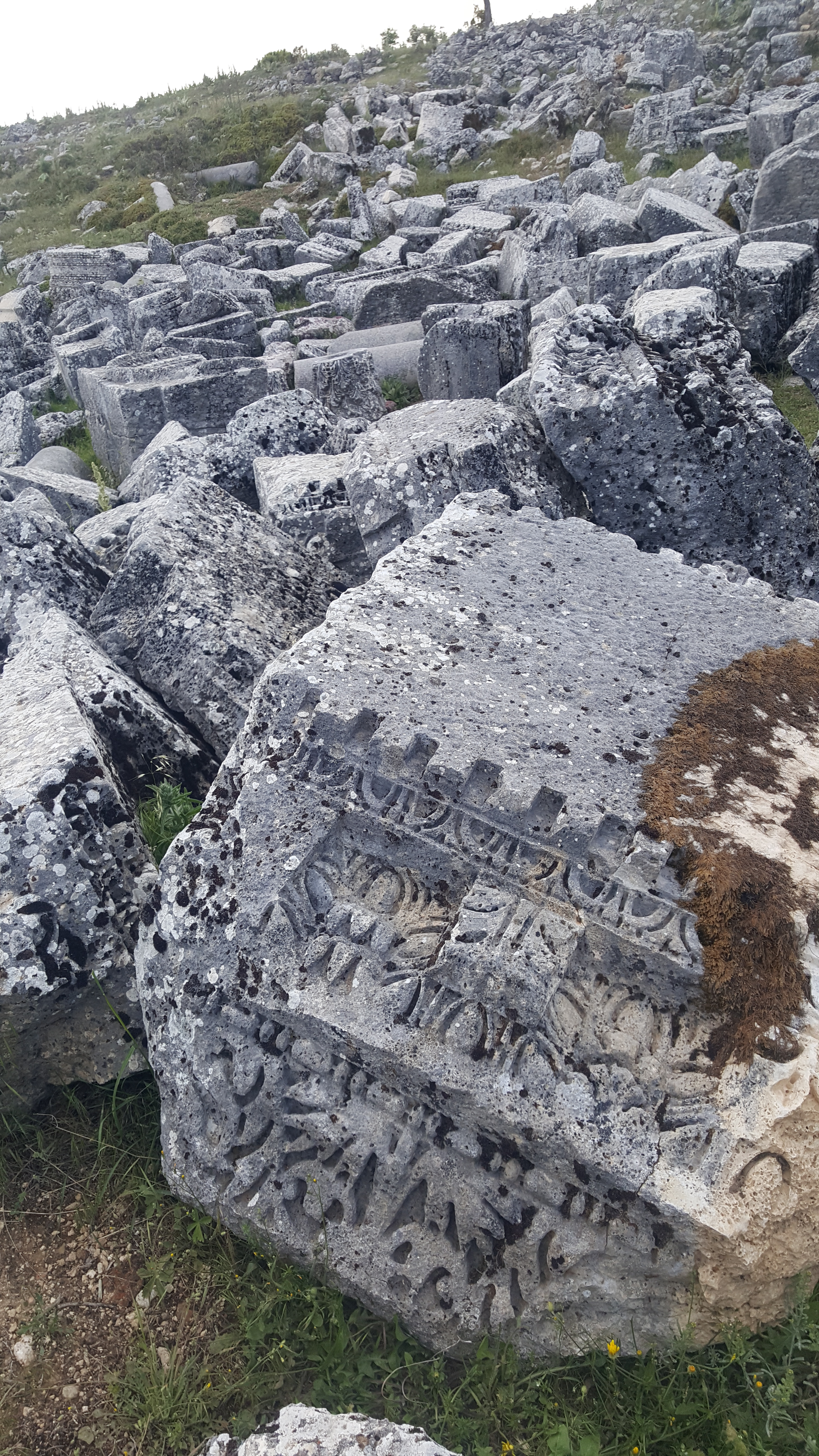
