= Avdancık, Osmangazi =

Village in Turkey

Avdancık
- Neighbourhood
- Location in Turkey Avdancık (Marmara)
- Coordinates: 40.2932°N 29.1707°E
- Country: Turkey
- Province: Bursa
- District: Osmangazi
- Population (2022): 432
- Time zone: UTC+3 (TRT)

Avdancık is a neighbourhood in the municipality and district of Osmangazi, Bursa Province in Turkey. Its population is 432 (2022).
