= Dutalanı, Bucak =

Village in Turkey

Dutalanı
- Village
- Location in Turkey
- Coordinates: 37°25′N 30°44′E
- Country: Turkey
- Province: Burdur
- District: Bucak
- Population (2021): 116
- Time zone: UTC+3 (TRT)

Dutalanı is a village in the Bucak District of Burdur Province in Turkey. Its population is 116 (2021).
