= Kuşbaba, Bucak =

Village in Turkey

Kuşbaba
- Village
- Location in Turkey
- Coordinates: 37°27′06″N 30°25′54″E
- Country: Turkey
- Province: Burdur
- District: Bucak
- Population (2021): 789
- Time zone: UTC+3 (TRT)

Kuşbaba is a village in the Bucak District of Burdur Province in Turkey. Its population is 789 (2021).
