= Abdal Bridge (Bursa) =

Bridge in Turkey

Coordinates: 40°12′58.5″N 29°0′46.2″E

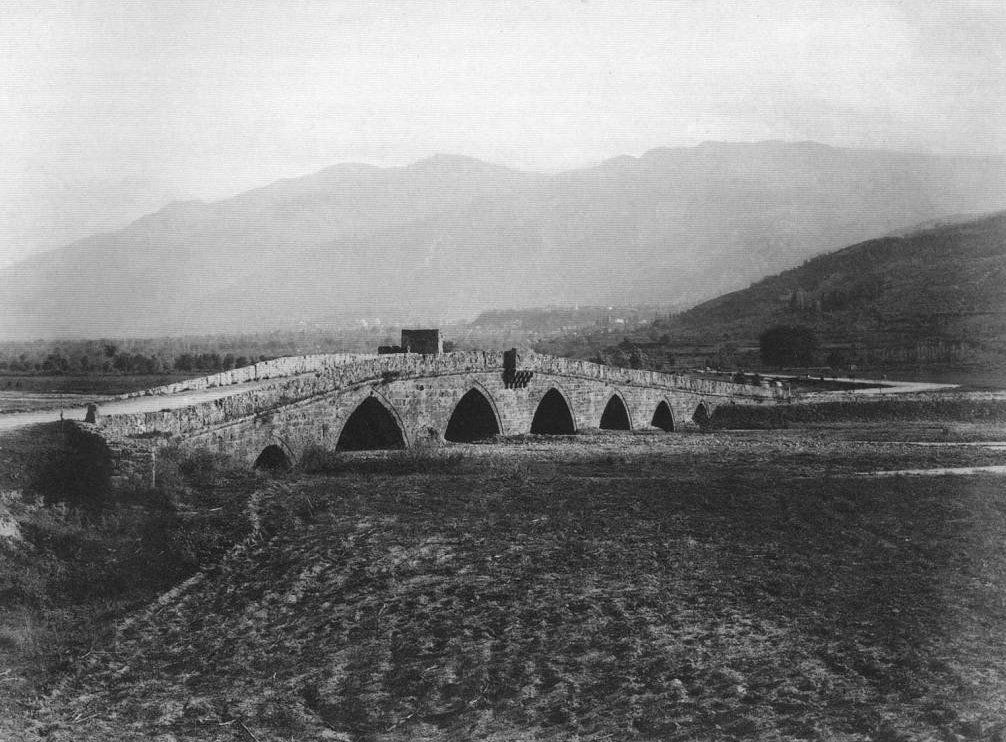
The Abdal Bridge photographed in the nineteenth century. All twelve of the bridge's arches have subsequently been exposed following restoration in the twentieth century

The Abdal Bridge (Turkish: Abdal Köprüsü) is a stone arch bridge in Bursa, Turkey. It was constructed in 1669 to carry the road to Mudanya across the Nilüfer River. Today it connects the Acemler and Hürriyet quarters of Bursa. The bridge was restored in 1971, and has been closed to vehicles since 1978.

The bridge was built at the instigation of a merchant called Abdal Çelebi, who was a Sufi follower (Murid) of Niyâzî-i Mısrî. The construction took three years. It is constructed of sandstone, and comprises twelve arches. These were only partially visible before the restoration, since the ends were filled in with soil.

The bridge is 70 m (230 ft) long and 4.8 m (16 ft) wide. It incorporates a stone parapet on its northern side and an inscription at its middle point. This dates from 1984 when the bridge underwent further restoration, and gives the year of construction for the bridge as 1667.
