= Çobanpınarı, Bucak =

Village in Turkey

Çobanpınarı
- Village
- Country: Turkey
- Province: Burdur
- District: Bucak
- Population (2021): 566
- Time zone: UTC+3 (TRT)

Çobanpınarı is a village in the Bucak District of Burdur Province in Turkey. Its population is 566 (2021).
