= Belören, Bucak =

Village in Turkey

Belören
- Village
- Location in Turkey
- Coordinates: 37.5242°N 30.6024°E
- Country: Turkey
- Province: Burdur
- District: Bucak
- Population (2021): 45
- Time zone: UTC+3 (TRT)

Belören is a village in the Bucak District of Burdur Province in Turkey. Its population is 45 (2021).
