= Gürsu =

- District and municipality
- Map showing Gürsu District in Bursa Province

- Location in Turkey Gürsu (Marmara)
- Coordinates: 40°12′52″N 29°11′35″E
- Country: Turkey
- Province: Bursa

Government
  - Mayor: Mustafa Işık (AKP)
- Area: 106 km^{2} (41 sq mi)
- Population (2022): 102,601
  - Density: 970/km^{2} (2,500/sq mi)
- Time zone: UTC+3 (TRT)
- Postal code: 16580
- Area code: 0224
- Website: www.gursu.bel.tr

Gürsu is a municipality and district of Bursa Province, Turkey. Its area is 106 km^{2}, and its population is 102,601 (2022). The Mayor of Gürsu is Mustafa Işık.

== Composition ==
There are 15 neighbourhoods in Gürsu District:

- Adaköy
- Ağaköy
- Canbazlarköyü
- Dışkayaköyü
- Ericekköyü
- Hasanköy
- İğirdirköyü
- İpekyolu
- İstiklal
- Karahıdırköyü
- Kazıklıköyü
- Kumlukalan
- Kurtuluş
- Yenidoğan
- Zafer
