= Boğaziçi =

Boğaziçi can mean:

- Boğaziçi (Istanbul), those parts of Istanbul with a view of the Bosphorus
- Boğaziçi University, Turkish public research university in Istanbul
- Boğaziçi, Alaca
- Boğaziçi, Baklan
- Boğaziçi, Burdur
- Boğaziçi, Düzce, a town in Düzce District of Düzce Province
- Boğaziçi, Kemah
- Boğaziçi, Milas, a fishing village on the shore of Lake Tuzla, and site of the ancient city of Bargylia
- Boğaziçi, Gaziantep, a town in Islahiye district of Gaziantep Province
