= Beşkonak, Bucak =

Village in Turkey

Beşkonak
- Village
- Location in Turkey
- Coordinates: 37.4254°N 30.6778°E
- Country: Turkey
- Province: Burdur
- District: Bucak
- Population (2021): 348
- Time zone: UTC+3 (TRT)

Beşkonak is a village in the Bucak District of Burdur Province in Turkey. Its population is 348 (2021).
