= Karaaliler, Bucak =

Village in Turkey

Karaaliler
- Village
- Location in Turkey
- Coordinates: 37°22′19″N 30°27′14″E
- Country: Turkey
- Province: Burdur
- District: Bucak
- Population (2021): 354
- Time zone: UTC+3 (TRT)

Karaaliler is a village in the Bucak District of Burdur Province in Turkey. Its population is 354 (2021).
