= Karacaören, Bucak =

Village in Turkey

Karacaören
- Village
- Location in Turkey
- Coordinates: 37°22′16″N 30°49′16″E
- Country: Turkey
- Province: Burdur
- District: Bucak
- Population (2021): 134
- Time zone: UTC+3 (TRT)

Karacaören is a village in the Bucak District of Burdur Province in Turkey. Its population is 134 (2021).
