= Osmangazi =

- District and municipality
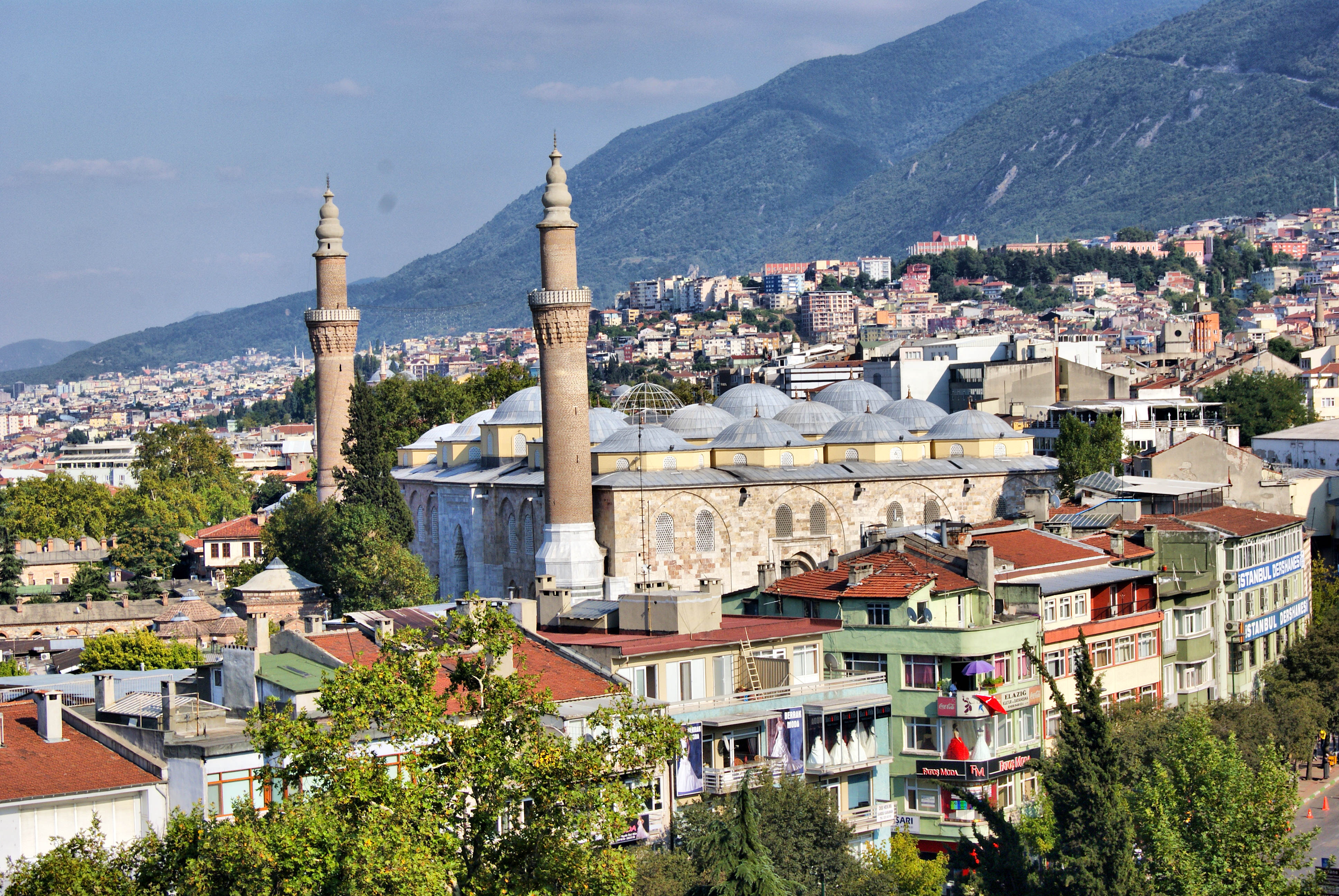
- Osmangazi with Grand Mosque of Bursa

- Map showing Osmangazi District in Bursa Province

- Location within Turkey Location within Marmara
- Coordinates: 40°11′54″N 29°03′36″E
- Country: Turkey
- Province: Bursa

Government
  - Mayor: Erkan Aydın (CHP)
- Area: 621 km^{2} (240 sq mi)
- Population (2022): 891,250
  - Density: 1,440/km^{2} (3,720/sq mi)
- Time zone: UTC+3 (TRT)
- Area code: 0224
- Website: www.osmangazi.bel.tr

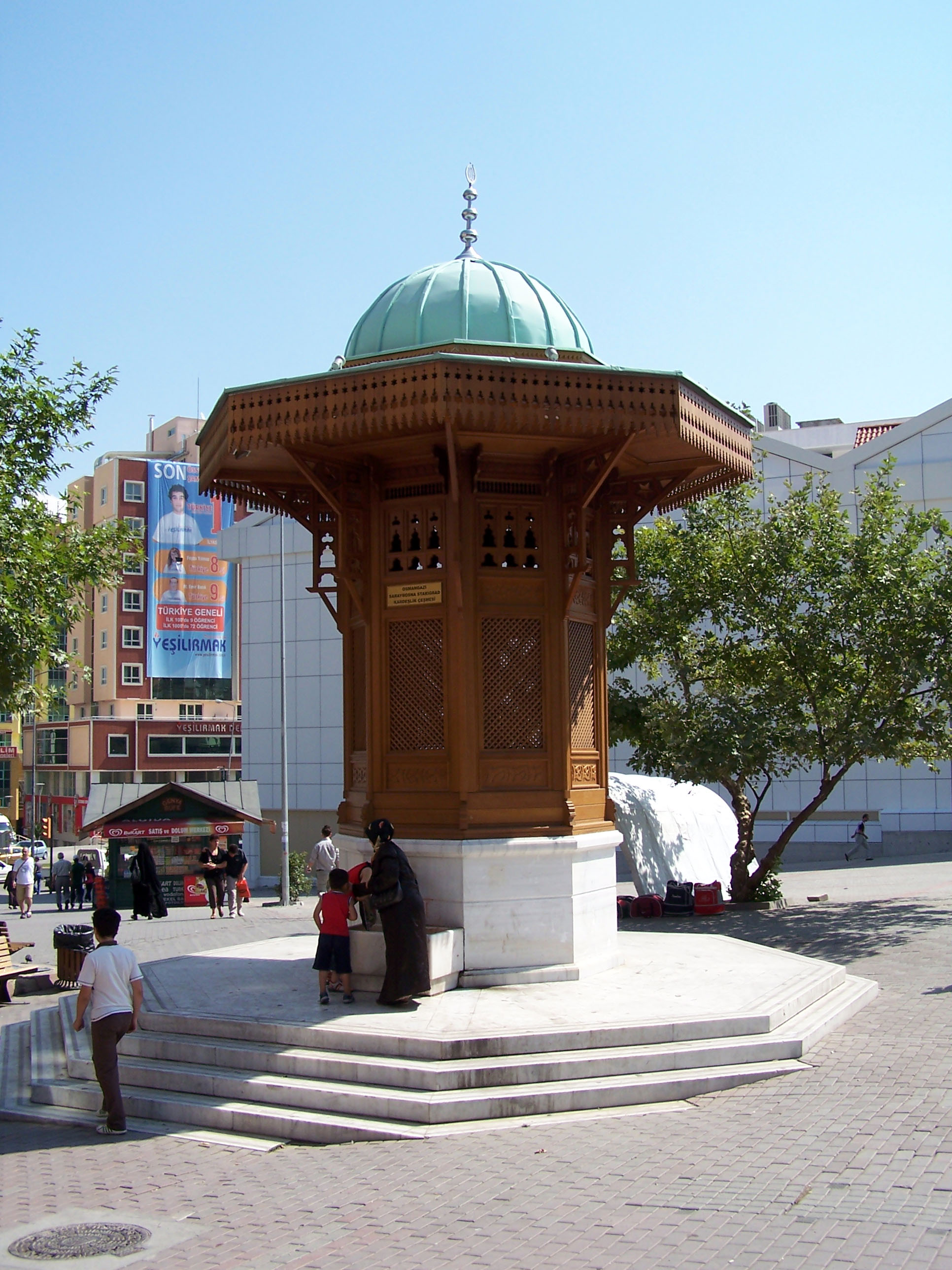
Fountain of brotherhood between Osmangazi, Bursa and Stari Grad, Sarajevo in Bursa.

Osmangazi is a municipality and district of Bursa Province, Turkey. Its area is 621 km^{2}, and its population is 891,250 (2022). It is one of the central metropolitan districts of the city of Bursa, as well as the fourth largest overall municipality in Turkey. On its own, it would be the 28th largest city in Turkey.

The district has been shaped by several civilizations: Rome, Byzantines, Seljuqians, and Ottomans. The first marks of the Ottoman Empire exist within Osmangazi where it extended from the foot of Uludağ to the plain of Bursa. Within the boundaries of Osmangazi, approximately 1800 registered historical buildings exist.

== History ==
It was stated that there were various settlements in Bursa and its surroundings by 4000 B.C. But the certain information related to the region belongs to 700 B.C. Homer called the region Mysia. There are two villages that are ancient Mysia settlements: Misi (Gümüştepe) and Misebolu. The region is called Phrygia in historical geography. It is known that Cimmerians, fleeing from the migration of the Scythians, put an end to Phrygian sovereignty. The name of Bursa comes from the founder of this city, Prussias, the King of Bithynia. The Bithynians, who migrated to the region in 7th century B.C., used the name Bithynia.

It was pointed out that one of the most important commanders that Carthage had recommended the establishment of the City of Prusias and Olympus to King Prusian I. in 185 B.C. By that time, "Prusa" has been transformed to Bursa.

When Bithynia joined the Roman Empire in 74 B.C., it became the Asian Province that was governed by proconsuls (head of the province), who were appointed in Rome.

Bursa was under the sovereignty of the Byzantine Empire between 385 and 1326 A.D. The city became a thermal city after the thermal baths while silk production in the region started in 550 A.D. Bursa was seized by Osman I in 1307 and conquered by Orhan, the son of Osman I, on 6 April 1335. The capital of the empire was moved to Bursa in 1335 and new development movements were initiated. When Bursa was conquered, the city consisted of the inner castle, but Orhan had the Orhan Gazi Complex built out of the town. Public buildings such as mosques, baths, soup houses, hospitals, madrasahs were built out of the walls, where new settlements had been created, hence a new tradition of settling area had been established. Right after the conquest of Istanbul by Sultan Mehmed II., the active role of Bursa and its qualification as the administrative center had faded away. There are no buildings surviving from the Roman and Byzantine era. It is believed that the walls surrounding the city were built by Bithynians and used by the Romans, Byzantines, and Ottomans after maintenance.

Bursa had developed more than other cities in the first two centuries of Ottoman rule. It was filled with a number of architectural structures and became a trade city as well as a science city, where various famous madrasahs were located. Hüdavendigar Complex of Sultan Murat I., Yıldırım Complex of Sultan Bayezid I., and Green Complex all began their construction under Sultan Mehmed I. and were finished by Sultan Murad II. They affected the spatial development of Bursa and still exist to this day. Industrialization within the city was accelerated in the republican era, so that the population and the urban development of the city changed in the 1960s. The geographical location and the agricultural and industrial potential have increased the attraction of the city.

== Geography ==
Osmangazi, the center of social and economic relations for years, is in the crossroad of roads to İzmir, İstanbul and Eskişehir. Osmangazi is the biggest district of Bursa that is on the southwest coast of Marmara Sea. Gökdere River on the east, Nilüfer River and Mudanya Road on the west, Katırlı Mountains on the north, Uludağ and Kirazlı Plateau are the natural and artificial boundaries of the district.

=== Composition ===
There are 136 neighbourhoods in Osmangazi District:

- Adalet
- Ahmetbey
- Ahmetpaşa
- Akpınar
- Aksungur
- Aktarhüssam
- Alacahırka
- Alacamescit
- Alaşar
- Alattin
- Alemdar
- Alipaşa
- Altınova
- Altıparmak
- Armutköy
- Atıcılar
- Avdancık
- Bağlarbaşı
- Bağlı
- Bahar
- Başaran
- Büyükdeliler
- Çağlayan
- Çaybaşı
- Çekirge
- Çeltikköy
- Çiftehavuzlar
- Çirişhane
- Çırpan
- Çukurcaköy
- Dağakçaköy
- Demirkapı
- Demirtaş Barbaros
- Demirtaş Cumhuriyet
- Demirtaş Sakarya
- Demirtaşpaşa
- Dereçavuş
- Dilkaldırım
- Dobruca
- Doğanbey
- Doğancı
- Doğanevler
- Dumlupınar
- Dürdane
- Ebu İshak
- Elmasbahçeler
- Emek Adnanmenderes
- Emek Fatihsultanmehmet
- Emek Zekaigümüşdiş
- Fatih
- Gaziakdemir
- Geçit
- Gökçeören
- Gülbahçe
- Gündoğdu
- Güneştepe
- Güneybayırı
- Güneybudaklar
- Hacıilyas
- Hamitler
- Hamzabey
- Hocaalizade
- Hocahasan
- Hüdavendiğar
- Hürriyet
- Hüseyinalanı
- İbrahimpaşa
- İnkaya
- İntizam
- İsmetiye
- İstiklal
- İvazpaşa
- Karabalçık
- Karaislah
- Kavaklı
- Kayhan
- Kemerçeşme
- Kirazlı
- Kırcaali
- Kiremitci
- Kocanaip
- Kovukçınar
- Küçükbalıklı
- Küçükdeliller
- Kükürtlü
- Küplüpınar
- Kuruçeşme
- Maksen
- Mehmet Akif
- Mollafenari
- Mollagürani
- Muradiye
- Mürseller
- Nalbantoğlu
- Namıkkemal
- Nilüfer
- Orhanbey
- Osmangazi
- Ovaakça Çeşmebaşı
- Ovaakça Eğitim
- Ovaakça Merkez
- Ovaakça Santral
- Panayır
- Pınarbaşı
- Reyhan
- Sakarya
- Santralgaraj
- Seçköy
- Seferışıklar
- Şehabettinpaşa
- Şehreküstü
- Selamet
- Selçukgazi
- Selimiye
- Sırameşeler
- Soğanlı
- Soğukkuyu
- Soğukpınar
- Süleymaniye
- Tahtakale
- Tayakadın
- Tuna
- Tuzaklı
- Tuzpazarı
- Ulu
- Uluçam
- Veyselkarani
- Yahşibey
- Yenibağlar
- Yeniceabat
- Yenikaraman
- Yenikent
- Yeşilova
- Yiğitali
- Yunuseli
- Zafer

== Economy ==
The following types of industries exist in Osmangazi: automotive supply industry, textile, towel, knitter & tricot, shoe industry, agricultural machines, furniture, leather, plastic, machine and metal industry, electric, foundry, welding machine, stove and knife sectors. Moreover, there are also oil and flour factories.

== Education ==
Two vocational high schools are located in the district, Bursa Sports High School at Sevgi St. in Veysel Karani neighborhood, and Bursa Agriculture Vocational High School at Hürriyer St. in Yenikaraman neighborhood.

== Main sights ==
- Protestant Church
- Reşat Oyal Culture Park, which is the symbol of Bursa,
- İnkaya Plane which is a natural monument, 500 years old,
- Tophane Slopes,
- Kozahan, which is located between Ulu Mosque and Orhan Mosque,
- Emirhan which was built by Orhan Bey in 1340, Muradiye Complex which is composed of madrasah, school, soup house, bath and mosque, and more than twenty tombs including Murat II. and Cem Sultan,
- Hüdavendigar Mosque,
- Grand Mosque of Bursa, which is the sample of multi-pillared and multi-domed mosques,
- Merinos City Park,
- Botanical Park,
- Soğanlı Zoo,
- Pınarbaşı Park,
- Soğukkuyu Park,
- Hamitler Park,
- Cable Water Ski Center.

== Historical monuments ==
- Bursa Castle
- Bursa Fortress,
- Tomb of Murad I.,
- Tomb of Pars Bey,
- Çakır Ağa Bath,
- Tombs of Osmangazi and Orhangazi,
- Tomb of Şehzade Mustafa, Bazaar,
- Archeology Museum,
- Atatürk Museum,
- Museum of Ottoman House,
- City Museum,
- Ördekli Culture Center,
- Gökdere Madrasah,
- Irgandı Bridge,
- Haraççıoğlu Madrasah,
- Karabaş-ı Veli Lodge,
- Balibey Khan,
- Muradiye Bath,
- Galle Khan

== International relations ==
=== Twin towns — sister cities ===
Osmangazi is twinned with:

- Boğaziçi, Northern Cyprus
- Aleppo, Syria
- Arriana, Greece
- Beit Hanoun, Palestine
- Čair (Skopje), North Macedonia
- Mehmetçik, Northern Cyprus
- Gaza City, Palestine
- Jericho, Palestine
- Kapchagay, Kazakhstan
- Kardzhali, Bulgaria
- Lahn-Dill (district), Germany
- Mamuša, Kosovo
- Obilić, Kosovo
- Omurtag, Bulgaria
- Preševo, Serbia
- Shaki, Azerbaijan
- Stari Grad (Sarajevo), Bosnia and Herzegovina
- Topeiros, Greece
- Turakurgan, Uzbekistan

== Notable people ==
- Hakan Arslan (born 1989), professional footballer
- Mert Hakan Yandaş (born 1994), professional footballer
- Enes Ünal (born 1997), professional footballer
- Emirhan Aydoğan (born 1997), professional footballer
- Altay Bayındır (born 1998), professional footballer
