= Avdancık, Bucak =

Village in Turkey

Avdancık
- Village
- Location in Turkey
- Coordinates: 37.3549°N 30.5664°E
- Country: Turkey
- Province: Burdur
- District: Bucak
- Population (2021): 334
- Time zone: UTC+3 (TRT)

Avdancık is a village in the Bucak District of Burdur Province in Turkey. Its population is 334 (2021).
