= Kızılcaağaç, Bucak =

Village in Turkey

Kızılcaağaç
- Village
- Country: Turkey
- Province: Burdur
- District: Bucak
- Population (2021): 151
- Time zone: UTC+3 (TRT)

Kızılcaağaç is a village in the Bucak District of Burdur Province in Turkey. Its population is 151 (2021).
