= Museum of Ottoman House =

Historic house in Turkey

The Museum of Ottoman House (Turkish: Osmanlı Evi Müzesi) is a historic house museum in Bursa, Turkey.

The museum is at 40°11′29″N 29°02′44″E in Osmangazi district of Bursa to the west of Muradiye Complex. The building dates back to the 17th century. Before its construction there was probably a mansion of the Ottoman sultan Murat II (r 1421–1451) where his son Mehmet II (r.1451–1481) was born. The building was opened in 1958 as a house museum. In 1973 and 1992 it underwent restoration.

The wooden house is a two-story building with a basement. Entrance to the basement is at north and to the ground floor is at west. In the ground floor, there are a wide hall with two symmetrical rooms in each side. In the upper floor, there are a harem room, a dining room and a guest room.

The two tombac candelabras stolen from Bursa Ottoman House were put up for sale in an auction in Sotheby’s in 1989. But they returned home in 1991.
