= Yüreğil, Bucak =

Village in Turkey

Yüreğil
- Village
- Location in Turkey
- Coordinates: 37.3669°N 30.3261°E
- Country: Turkey
- Province: Burdur
- District: Bucak
- Population (2021): 405
- Time zone: UTC+3 (TRT)

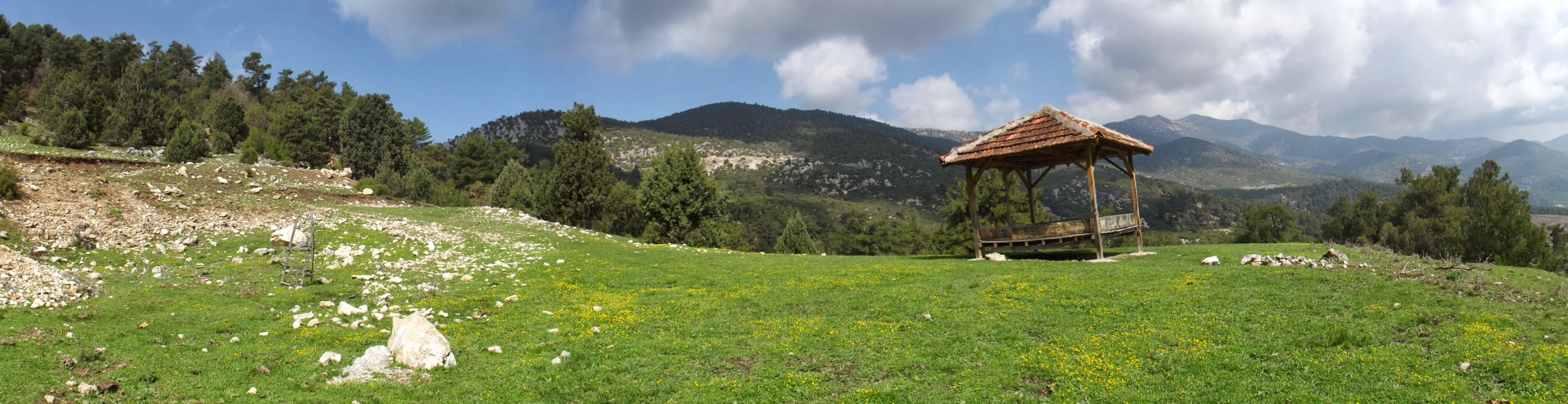

Yüreğil is a village in the Bucak District of Burdur Province in Turkey. Its population is 405 (2021).
