= Bucak, Burdur =

District in Turkey

Bucak
- Municipality
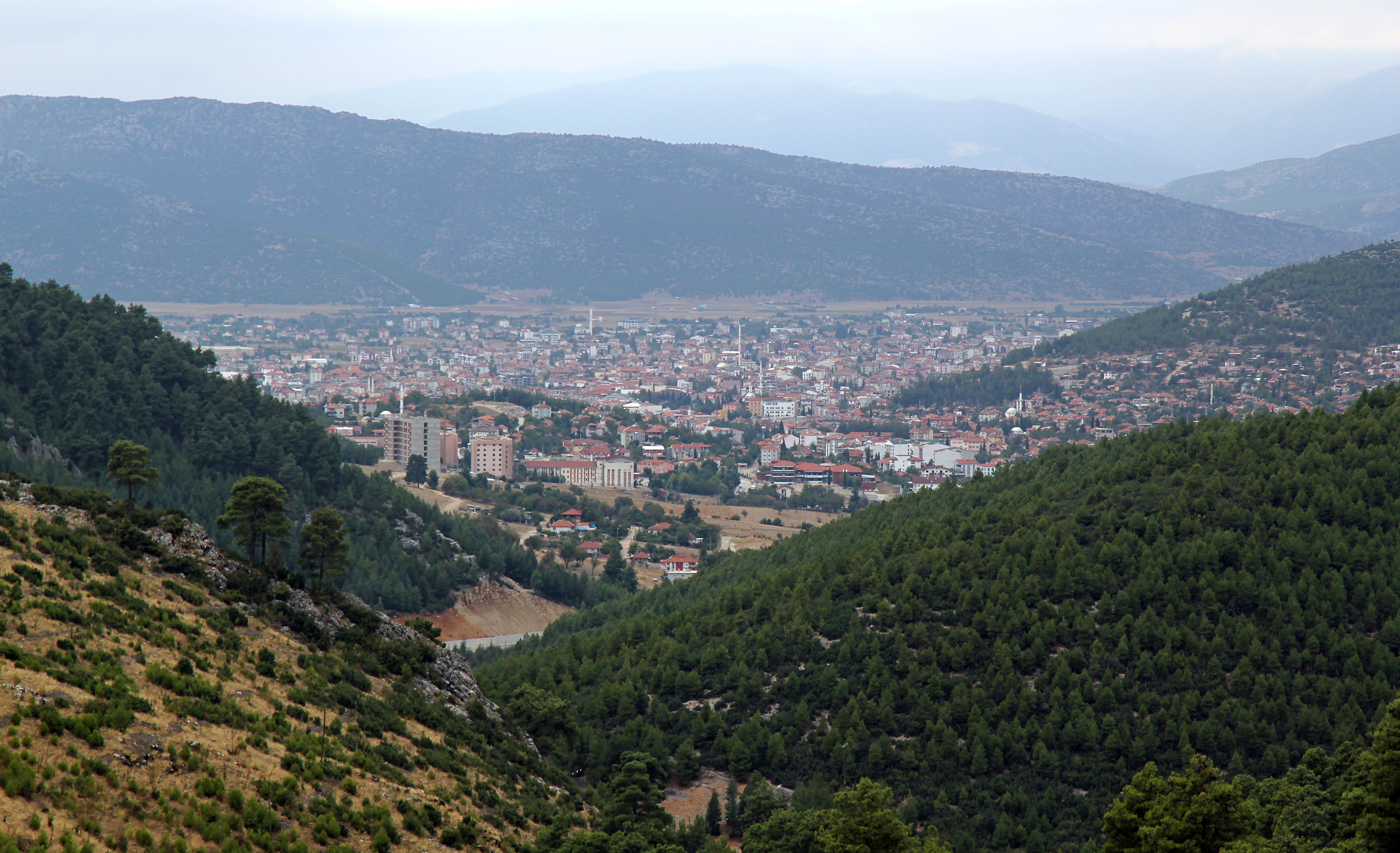

- Location within Turkey
- Coordinates: 37°27′33″N 30°35′43″E
- Country: Turkey
- Province: Burdur
- District: Bucak

Government
  - Mayor: Hülya Gümüş (CHP)
- Population (2024): 68,096
- Time zone: UTC+3 (TRT)
- Postal code: 15300
- Website: www.bucak.bel.tr

Bucak (literally "sheltered nook" or "corner" in Turkish) is a town in Burdur Province, Turkey. It is the seat of Bucak District. Its population is 45,865 (2021), making it the second-most populous municipality of Burdur Province. It was formerly named "Oğuzhan"; the name was changed on 30 May 1926. It is said that the name Oğuzhan came from the Oghuz Turks who settled in this town.

Bucak has good connections to other parts of Turkey. Antalya lies 75 km to the south, Isparta 70 km to northeast and Burdur 40 km to the northwest. Neighbouring towns include Çeltikçi and Ağlasun to the north and Kemer to the west.

A few historic buildings and houses remain, but most of the buildings are modern. There are several historic sites remaining in the district, such as the ancient Cremna and Milyos and the Seljuk-era caravanserais of İncirhan and Susuz Kervansaray.

There are many marble resources around Bucak, and many of the inhabitants deal with marble, which is processed in the marble factories located around Bucak. The processed marble is exported all over the world.

Many entrepreneurs from Bucak have built high schools and educational institutions, including Bucak Hikmet Tolunay Vocational Institute, Bucak Zeliha Tolunay Practical Technology and Business Faculty, Bucak Adem Tolunay Science High School, and Mehmet Cadıl Anatolian Teacher Training High School.

== Sister cities ==
- Krotoszyn, Poland
