= Bursa Province =

Province of Turkey

Coordinates: 40°09′00″N 29°01′15″E

Bursa Province Bursa ili
- Province and metropolitan municipality
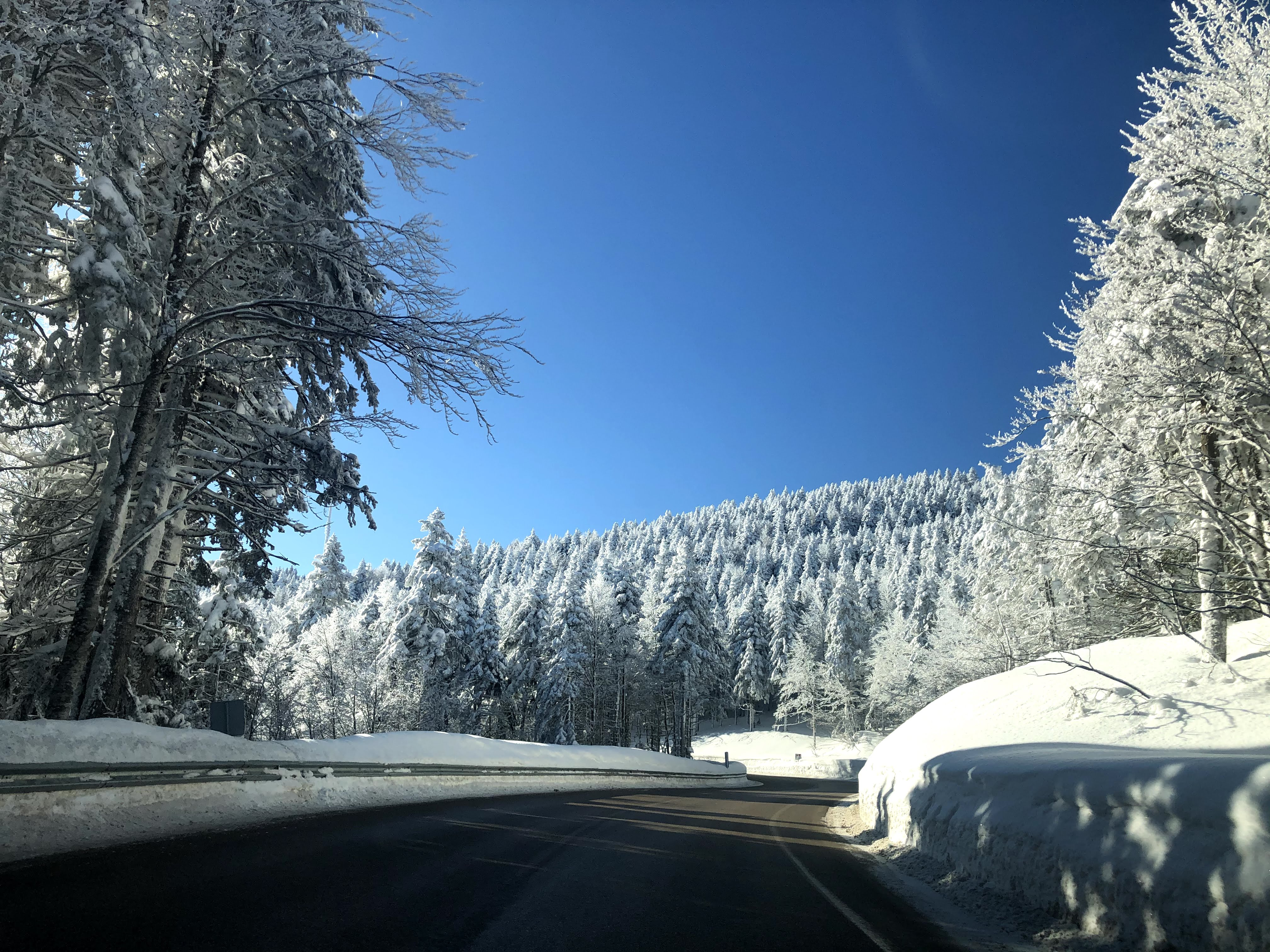
- Pine trees seen from Uludağ Road

- Flag

- Location of the province within Turkey
- Country: Turkey
- Seat: Bursa

Government
  - Mayor: Şahin Biba (AK Party)
  - Vali: Erol Ayyıldız
- Area: 10,813 km^{2} (4,175 sq mi)
- Population (2022): 3,194,720
  - Density: 295.45/km^{2} (765.22/sq mi)
- Time zone: UTC+3 (TRT)
- Area code: 0224
- Website: www.bursa.bel.tr www.bursa.gov.tr

Bursa Province (Turkish: Bursa ili) is a province and metropolitan municipality in Turkey along the Sea of Marmara coast in northwestern Anatolia. It borders Balıkesir to the west, Kütahya to the south, Bilecik and Sakarya to the east, Kocaeli to the northeast and Yalova to the north. Its area is 10,813 km^{2}, and its population is 3,194,720 (2022). Its traffic code is 16.

Almost all of Bursa Province (including the city of Bursa) is in the Marmara region, but the districts of Büyükorhan, Harmancık, Keles and Orhaneli are in the Aegean Region.

The city of Bursa was the capital of the Ottoman State between 1326 and 1365, until the Ottoman conquest of Edirne, then known as Adrianople. Adrianople was the capital until 1453, when Constantinople became the final Ottoman capital.

== Geography ==
Köppen map of Bursa Province and surrounding regions:
- BSk
- Csa
- Csb
- Cfa
- Dsb
- Dsc

Bursa mostly experiences a Mediterranean climate (Csa and Csb). Inner parts of the province are higher in elevation and show continental characteristics (Dsb and Dsc). Uludağ is the highest mountain in the province with 2,543 meters of elevation.

=== Beaches ===
- Kumla beach
- Kurşunlu beach
- Orhangazi beach
- Mudanya beach
- Manastir beach
- Kapakli beach

== Districts ==

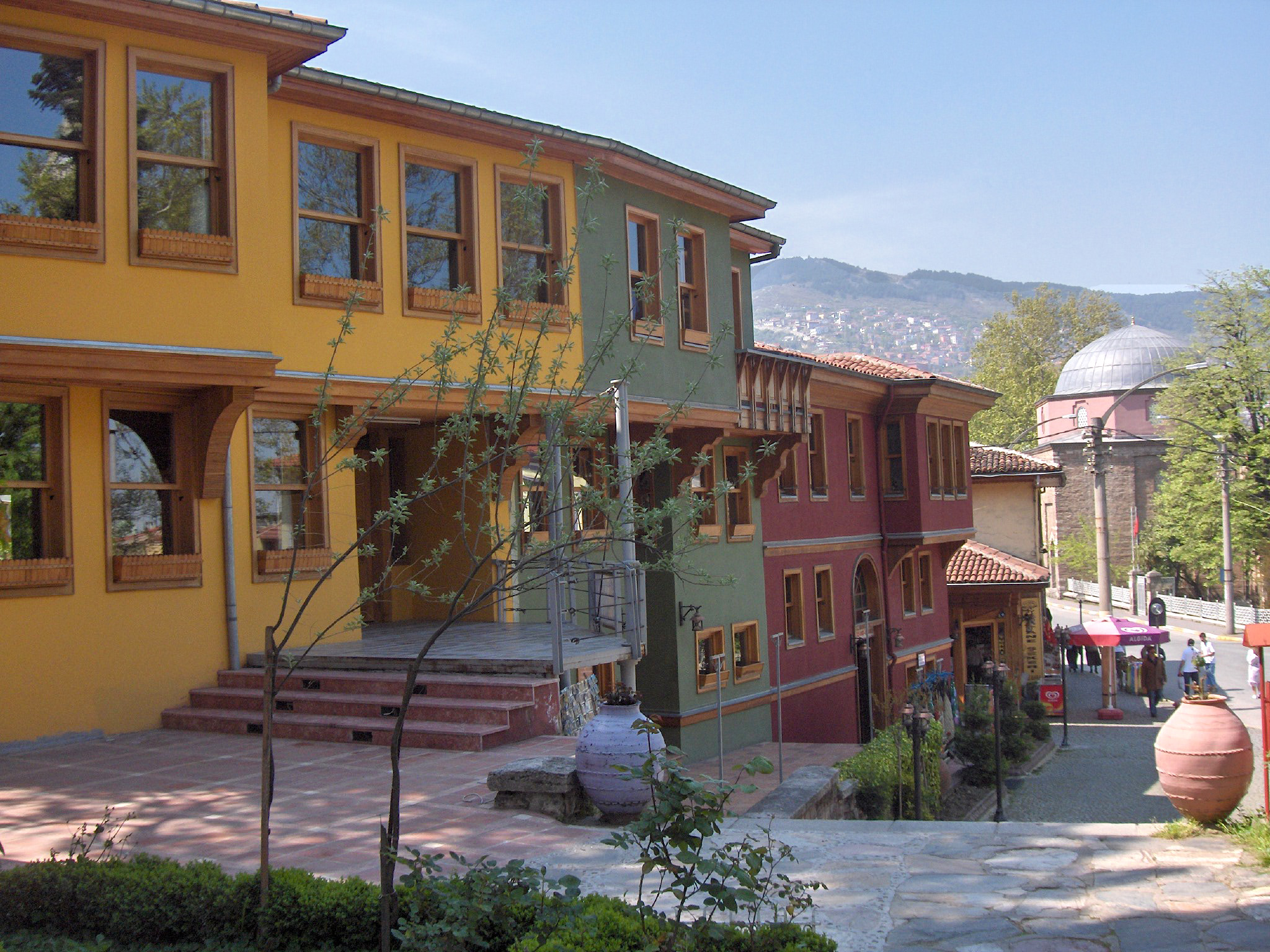
Ottoman Architecture in Bursa

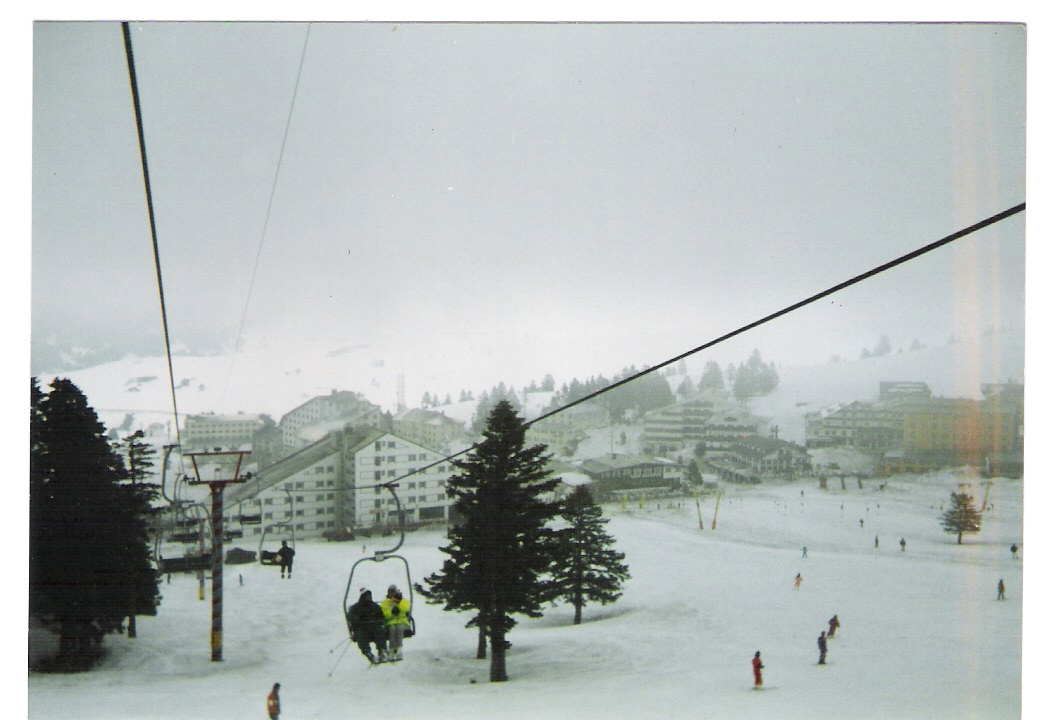
Uludağ

- Büyükorhan
- Gemlik
- Gürsu
- Harmancık
- İnegöl
- İznik
- Karacabey
- Keles
- Kestel
- Mudanya
- Mustafakemalpaşa
- Nilüfer
- Orhaneli
- Orhangazi
- Osmangazi
- Yenişehir
- Yıldırım

== Demographics ==
Historical population
Year	Pop.	±% p.a.
1927	401,595	—
1940	461,648	+1.08%
1950	545,919	+1.69%
1960	693,894	+2.43%
1970	847,884	+2.02%
1980	1,148,492	+3.08%
1990	1,603,137	+3.39%
2000	2,125,140	+2.86%
2010	2,605,495	+2.06%
2018	2,994,521	+1.75%

== See also ==
- City of Bursa
- İznik
- List of populated places in Bursa Province
- Places of interest in Bursa
