= List of populated places in Burdur Province =

Places in Turkey

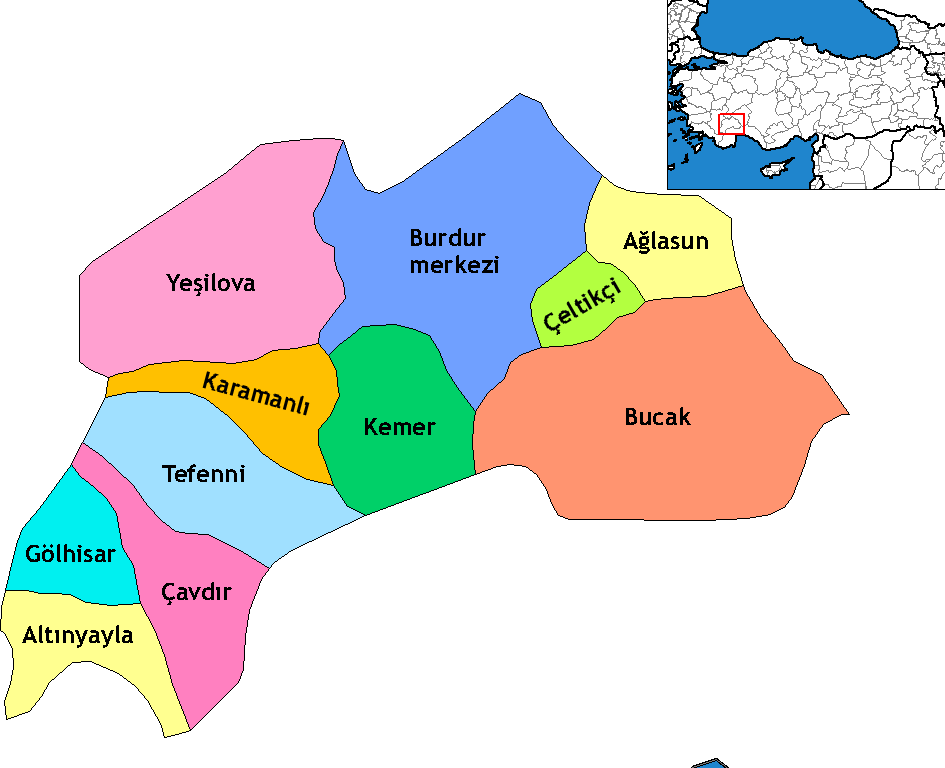
Burdur Province

Below is the list of populated places in Burdur Province, Turkey by the districts. In the following lists first place in each list is the administrative center of the district.

== Burdur ==
- Burdur
- Aksu, Burdur
- Akyaka, Burdur
- Akyayla, Burdur
- Askeriye, Burdur
- Aşağı Müslümler, Burdur
- Aziziye, Burdur
- Başmakçı, Burdur
- Bayındır, Burdur
- Bereket, Burdur
- Beşkavak, Burdur
- Boğaziçi, Burdur
- Bozlar, Burdur
- Büğdüz, Burdur
- Cimbilli, Burdur
- Çallıca, Burdur
- Çatağıl, Burdur
- Çendik, Burdur
- Çine, Burdur
- Düğer, Burdur
- Erikli, Burdur
- Gökçebağ, Burdur
- Günalan, Burdur
- Güneyyayla, Burdur
- Hacılar, Burdur
- Halıcılar, Burdur
- İğdeli, Burdur
- İlyas, Burdur
- Kapaklı, Burdur
- Karacaören, Burdur
- Karaçal, Burdur
- Karakent, Burdur
- Kartalpınar, Burdur
- Kavacık, Burdur
- Kayaaltı, Burdur
- Kayış, Burdur
- Kocapınar, Burdur
- Kozluca, Burdur
- Kökez, Burdur
- Kumluca, Burdur
- Kuruçay, Burdur
- Sarıova, Burdur
- Soğanlı, Burdur
- Suludere, Burdur
- Taşkapı, Burdur
- Ulupınar, Burdur
- Yakaköy, Burdur
- Yarıköy, Burdur
- Yassıgüme, Burdur
- Yaylabeli, Burdur
- Yazıköy, Burdur
- Yeşildağ, Burdur

== Ağlasun ==
- Ağlasun
- Aşağıyumrutaş, Ağlasun
- Çamlıdere, Ağlasun
- Dereköy, Ağlasun
- Hisar, Ağlasun
- Kiprit, Ağlasun
- Mamak, Ağlasun
- Yazır, Ağlasun
- Yeşilbaşköy, Ağlasun
- Yumrutaş, Ağlasun

== Altınyayla ==
- Altınyayla
- Asmabağ, Altınyayla
- Ballık, Altınyayla
- Çatak, Altınyayla
- Çörten, Altınyayla
- Kızılyaka, Altınyayla

== Bucak ==
- Bucak
- Alkaya, Bucak
- Avdancık, Bucak
- Belören, Bucak
- Beşkonak, Bucak
- Boğazköy, Bucak
- Çamlık, Bucak
- Çobanpınarı, Bucak
- Dağarcık, Bucak
- Demirli, Bucak
- Dutalanı, Bucak
- Elsazı, Bucak
- Gündoğdu, Bucak
- Heybeli, Bucak
- İncirdere, Bucak
- Karaaliler, Bucak
- Karacaören, Bucak
- Karaot, Bucak
- Karapınar, Bucak
- Karaseki, Bucak
- Kargı, Bucak
- Kavacık, Bucak
- Keçili, Bucak
- Kestel, Bucak
- Kızılcaağaç, Bucak
- Kızılkaya, Bucak
- Kızıllı, Bucak
- Kızılseki, Bucak
- Kocaaliler, Bucak
- Kuşbaba, Bucak
- Kuyubaşı, Bucak
- Seydiköy, Bucak
- Susuz, Bucak
- Taşyayla, Bucak
- Uğurlu, Bucak
- Ürkütlü, Bucak
- Üzümlübel, Bucak
- Yuva, Bucak
- Yüreğil, Bucak

== Çavdır ==
- Çavdır
- Anbarcık, Çavdır
- Bayır, Çavdır
- Bölmepınar, Çavdır
- Büyükalan, Çavdır
- İshakköy, Çavdır
- Karaköy, Çavdır
- Kayacık, Çavdır
- Kızıllar, Çavdır
- Kozağacı, Çavdır
- Küçükalan, Çavdır
- Söğüt, Çavdır
- Yazır, Çavdır

== Çeltikçi ==
- Çeltikçi
- Bağsaray, Çeltikçi
- Çebiş, Çeltikçi
- Güvenli, Çeltikçi
- Kuzköy, Çeltikçi
- Ovacık, Çeltikçi
- Tekkeköy, Çeltikçi

== Gölhisar ==
- Gölhisar
- Asmalı, Gölhisar
- Çamköy, Gölhisar
- Elmalıyurt, Gölhisar
- Evciler, Gölhisar
- Hisarardı, Gölhisar
- İbecik, Gölhisar
- Karapınar, Gölhisar
- Kargalı, Gölhisar
- Sorkun, Gölhisar
- Uylupınar, Gölhisar
- Yamadı, Gölhisar
- Yeşildere, Gölhisar
- Yusufça, Gölhisar

== Karamanlı ==
- Karamanlı
- Bademli, Karamanlı
- Dereköy, Karamanlı
- Kağılcık, Karamanlı
- Kayalı, Karamanlı
- Kılavuzlar, Karamanlı
- Kılçan, Karamanlı
- Manca, Karamanlı
- Mürseller, Karamanlı

== Kemer ==
- Kemer
- Akçaören, Kemer
- Akören, Kemer
- Belenli, Kemer
- Elmacık, Kemer
- Kayı, Kemer
- Pınarbaşı, Kemer
- Yakalar, Kemer

== Tefenni ==
- Tefenni
- Başpınar, Tefenni
- Bayramlar, Tefenni
- Belkaya, Tefenni
- Beyköy, Tefenni
- Çaylı, Tefenni
- Ece, Tefenni
- Hasanpaşa, Tefenni
- Karamusa, Tefenni
- Sazak, Tefenni
- Seydiler, Tefenni
- Yaylaköy, Tefenni
- Yeşilköy, Tefenni
- Yuva, Tefenni
- Yuvalak, Tefenni

== Yeşilova ==
- Yeşilova
- Akçaköy, Yeşilova
- Alanköy, Yeşilova
- Armut, Yeşilova
- Aşağı Kırlı, Yeşilova
- Başkuyu, Yeşilova
- Bayındır, Yeşilova
- Bayırbaşı, Yeşilova
- Bedirli, Yeşilova
- Beyköy, Yeşilova
- Büyükyaka, Yeşilova
- Çaltepe, Yeşilova
- Çardak, Yeşilova
- Çeltek, Yeşilova
- Çuvallı, Yeşilova
- Dereköy, Yeşilova
- Doğanbaba, Yeşilova
- Düden, Yeşilova
- Elden, Yeşilova
- Gençali, Yeşilova
- Gökçeyaka, Yeşilova
- Güney, Yeşilova
- Harmanlı, Yeşilova
- Horozköy, Yeşilova
- Işıklar, Yeşilova
- İğdir, Yeşilova
- Karaköy, Yeşilova
- Karatlı, Yeşilova
- Kavak, Yeşilova
- Kayadibi, Yeşilova
- Niyazlar, Yeşilova
- Onacak, Yeşilova
- Orhanlı, Yeşilova
- Örencik, Yeşilova
- Salda, Yeşilova
- Sazak, Yeşilova
- Taşpınar, Yeşilova
- Yarışlı, Yeşilova
- Yukarı Kırlı, Yeşilova
