= Söğüt, Burdur =

Söğüt
- Municipality
- Location in Turkey
- Coordinates: 37°02′N 29°49′E
- Country: Turkey
- Province: Burdur
- District: Çavdır
- Elevation: 1,420 m (4,660 ft)
- Population (2021): 3,097
- Time zone: UTC+3 (TRT)
- Postal code: 15930
- Area code: 0248

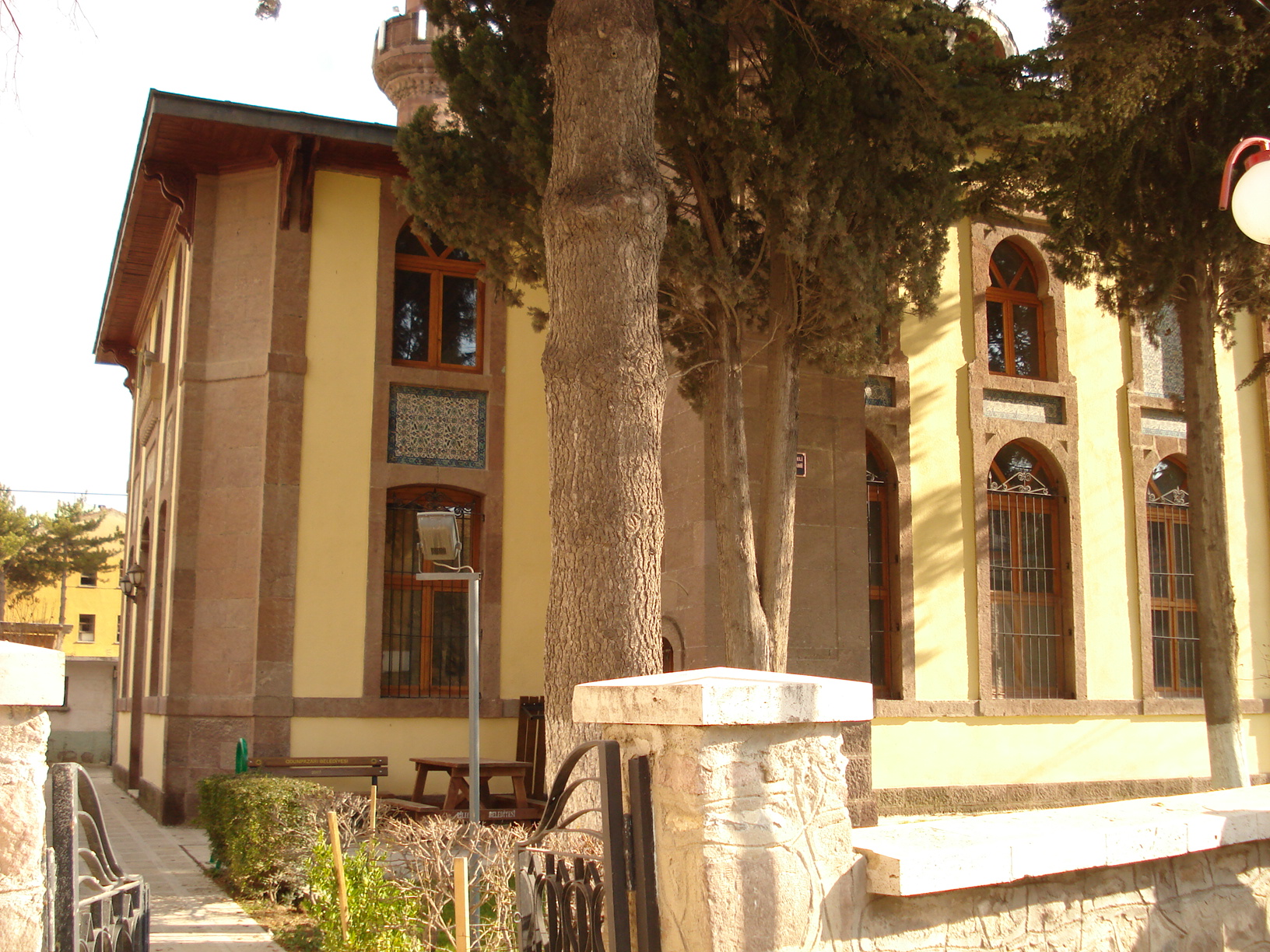
Çifteminareli Hamidiye Mosque in Söğüt

Söğüt is a town (belde) in the Çavdır District, Burdur Province, Turkey. Its population is 3,097 (2021). It is 9 kilometres (5.6 mi) east of Çavdır Dam. Distance to Çavdır is 20 kilometres (12 mi).
