= Kozağacı =

Kozağacı (literally "walnut tree" in Turkish) may refer to the following places in Turkey:

- Kozağacı, Burdur, a town in the district of Çavdır, Burdur Province
- Kozağacı, Gündoğmuş, a village in the district of Gündoğmuş, Antalya Province
- Kozağacı, Korkuteli, a village in the district of Korkuteli, Antalya Province
- Kozağacı Dam

== See also ==
- Kozağaç (disambiguation), different form of the same word
