= Kayaaltı =

Kayaaltı can refer to:

- Kayaaltı, Burdur
- Kayaaltı, Göle
- Kayaaltı, Oltu
