= Lysinia =

Ancient Lycian town

Coordinates: 37°41′55″N 30°04′15″E

Lysinia (Ancient Greek: Λυσινία) or Lysinoe (Λυσινόη) was a town in the north of ancient Pisidia and later assigned to Pamphylia. Hierocles has the name as Lysenara (Λυσήναρα). It was located on the south of the Ascania Lacus, and west of Sagalassus.

It became the seat of a bishop; no longer a residential bishopric, it remains a titular see of the Roman Catholic Church.

Its site is located near the modern town of Karakent in Burdur Province, Turkey.
