= Belkaya =

Belkaya can refer to:

- Belkaya Dam
- Belkaya, Tefenni
