= Magastara =

Town of ancient Pisidia during Roman times

Coordinates: 37°42′58″N 30°23′20″E

Magastara was a town of ancient Pisidia inhabited during Roman times. Its name does not occur in ancient authors, but is inferred from epigraphic and other evidence.

Its site is tentatively located near Lengüme (modern name Günalan), in Asiatic Turkey.
