= Kumluca (disambiguation) =

Kumluca usually refers to the district center in Antalya Province, Turkey, but may also refer to:

- Kumluca, Bartın, a town in Bartın Province, Turkey
- Kumluca, Burdur
- Kumluca, Hasankeyf, a village in Batman Province, Turkey
- Kumluca, Sarayköy
- Kumluca, Taşova, a village in Amasya Province, Turkey
