= Eceköy, Tefenni =

Village in Turkey

Eceköy
- Neighbourhood
- Location in Turkey
- Coordinates: 39.739°N 29.977°E
- Country: Turkey
- Province: Burdur
- District: Tefenni
- Municipality: Tefenni
- Population (2021): 47
- Time zone: UTC+3 (TRT)

Eceköy (also: Ece) is a neighborhood of the town Tefenni, Tefenni District, Burdur Province, Turkey. Its population is 47 (2021).
