= Erikli, Burdur =

Village in Turkey

Erikli
- Village
- Location in Turkey
- Coordinates: 37°27′4″N 30°14′21″E
- Country: Turkey
- Province: Burdur
- District: Burdur
- Population (2021): 63
- Time zone: UTC+3 (TRT)

Erikli is a village in the Burdur District of Burdur Province in Turkey. Its population is 63 (2021).

== History ==
Name of the village is mentioned as Hacıefe in the records of 1925. While it was a neighborhood of Kozluca village before, it gained the status of a village on 21 June 1948.
