= Eceköy =

Eceköy can refer to:

- Eceköy, Bozüyük
- Eceköy, Tefenni
