= Ambarcık =

Ambarcık can refer to:

- Ambarcık, Aydın
- Ambarcık, Çavdır
