= Mürseller =

Mürseller can refer to:

- Mürseller, Karamanlı
- Mürseller, Osmangazi
