= Corten (disambiguation) =

Corten is a steel alloy.

Corten may also refer to:

- Corten, Taraclia, a commune in Moldova
- Çörten, Altınyayla, a village in Turkey
