= Ballık =

Ballık (literally "honeypot") is a Turkish place name that may refer to the following places in Turkey:

- Ballık, Altınyayla
- Ballık, Kastamonu, a village in the district of Kastamonu, Kastamonu Province
- Ballık, Sandıklı, a village in the district of Sandıklı, Afyonkarahisar Province
