= Kayalıköy =

Kayalıköy can refer to:

- Kayalıköy Dam
- Kayalıköy, Karamanlı
