= Hasanpaşa, Tefenni =

Hasanpaşa
- Village
- Location within Turkey
- Coordinates: 37°15′N 29°53′E
- Country: Turkey
- Province: Burdur
- District: Tefenni
- Elevation: 1,250 m (4,100 ft)
- Population (2021): 533
- Time zone: UTC+3 (TRT)
- Postal code: 15660
- Area code: 0248

Hasanpaşa is a village in Tefenni District of Burdur Province, Turkey. Its population is 533 (2021). Before the 2013 reorganisation, it was a town (belde). The distance to Tefenni is 14 kilometres (8.7 mi) and to Burdur is 92 kilometres (57 mi).

The town was founded by Kınalı tribe of Turkmens. It was a part of Hamidoğlu Beylik in the early 14th century. The local governor of the settlement was a certain Hasan Pasha who subdued the bandits around the settlement and the settlement was named accordingly. In 1331 Hasanpaşa became a part of the Ottoman Empire. In 1993 Hasanpaşa was declared a seat of township. Major economic sectors of the town is agriculture and animal husbandry. Cereals and sugar beet are the main crops. Wood preservation factory "Ramtaş" also contributes to town economy.
