= Moatra =

Town of ancient Pisidia

Coordinates: 37°32′55″N 30°17′10″E

Moatra was a town of ancient Pisidia inhabited during Roman times.

Its site is located near Bereket, in Asiatic Turkey.
