= Yaylabeli =

Yaylabeli can refer to:

- Yaylabeli, Burdur
- Yaylabeli, Mudurnu
- Yaylabeli, Refahiye
