= Akyayla =

Akyayla can refer to:

- Akyayla, Burdur
- Akyayla, Dursunbey
