= Kızıllar =

Kızıllar may refer to the following places in Turkey:

- Kızıllar, Çavdır
- Kızıllar, Kozan
- Kızıllar, Ulus
