= Aziziye, Burdur =

Village in Turkey

Aziziye
- Village
- Location in Turkey
- Coordinates: 37.4254°N 30.2576°E
- Country: Turkey
- Province: Burdur
- District: Burdur
- Population (2021): 548
- Time zone: UTC+3 (TRT)

Aziziye is a village in the Burdur District of Burdur Province in Turkey. Its population is 548 (2021).
