= Bayramlar, Tefenni =

Village in Turkey

Bayramlar
- Village
- Location in Turkey
- Coordinates: 37.2336°N 29.8310°E
- Country: Turkey
- Province: Burdur
- District: Tefenni
- Population (2021): 292
- Time zone: UTC+3 (TRT)

Bayramlar is a village in the Tefenni District of Burdur Province in Turkey. Its population is 292 (2021).
