= Çatağıl, Burdur =

Village in Turkey

Çatağıl
- Village
- Location in Turkey
- Coordinates: 37.6883°N 30.3872°E
- Country: Turkey
- Province: Burdur
- District: Burdur
- Population (2021): 1,324
- Time zone: UTC+3 (TRT)

Çatağıl is a village in the Burdur District of Burdur Province in Turkey. Its population is 1,324 (2021).
