= Çaylı, Tefenni =

Village in Turkey

Çaylı
- Village
- Country: Turkey
- Province: Burdur
- District: Tefenni
- Population (2021): 96
- Time zone: UTC+3 (TRT)

Çaylı is a village in the Tefenni District of Burdur Province in Turkey. Its population is 96 (2021).
