= Bademli, Karamanlı =

Village in Turkey

Bademli
- Village
- Location in Turkey
- Coordinates: 37.4258°N 29.9141°E
- Country: Turkey
- Province: Burdur
- District: Karamanlı
- Population (2021): 400
- Time zone: UTC+3 (TRT)

Bademli is a village in the Karamanlı District of Burdur Province in Turkey. Its population is 400 (2021).
