= Hacılar, Burdur =

Village in Turkey

Hacılar
- Village
- Location in Turkey
- Coordinates: 37.58178°N 30.09337°E
- Country: Turkey
- Province: Burdur
- District: Burdur
- Population (2021): 380
- Time zone: UTC+3 (TRT)

Hacılar is a village in the Burdur District of Burdur Province in Turkey. Its population is 380 (2021).
