= Akçaören, Kemer =

Village in Turkey

Akçaören
- Village
- Location in Turkey
- Coordinates: 37.3969°N 30.1465°E
- Country: Turkey
- Province: Burdur
- District: Kemer
- Population (2021): 140
- Time zone: UTC+3 (TRT)

Akçaören is a village in the Kemer District of Burdur Province in Turkey. Its population is 140 (2021).
