= Yakalar, Kemer =

Village in Turkey

Yakalar
- Village
- Location in Turkey
- Coordinates: 37°19′N 30°01′E
- Country: Turkey
- Province: Burdur
- District: Kemer
- Population (2021): 294
- Time zone: UTC+3 (TRT)

Yakalar is a village in the Kemer District of Burdur Province in Turkey. Its population is 294 (2021).
