= Yeşildağ, Burdur =

Village in Turkey

Yeşildağ
- Village
- Country: Turkey
- Province: Burdur
- District: Burdur
- Population (2021): 70
- Time zone: UTC+3 (TRT)

Yeşildağ is a village in the Burdur District of Burdur Province in Turkey. Its population is 70 (2021).
