= Karaçal, Burdur =

Village in Turkey

Karaçal
- Village
- Country: Turkey
- Province: Burdur
- District: Burdur
- Population (2021): 241
- Time zone: UTC+3 (TRT)

Karaçal is a village in the Burdur District of Burdur Province in Turkey. Its population is 241 (2021).
