= Suludere, Burdur =

Village in Turkey

Suludere
- Village
- Country: Turkey
- Province: Burdur
- District: Burdur
- Population (2021): 396
- Time zone: UTC+3 (TRT)

Suludere is a village in the Burdur District of Burdur Province in Turkey. As of 2021, it had a population of 396.
