= Kozağacı, Burdur =

Kozağacı
- Village
- Location within Turkey
- Coordinates: 37°04′N 29°41′E
- Country: Turkey
- Province: Burdur
- District: Çavdır
- Elevation: 1,290 m (4,230 ft)
- Population (2021): 1,125
- Time zone: UTC+3 (TRT)
- Postal code: 15920
- Area code: 0248

Kozağacı (lit. 'walnut tree', also: Kozağac) is a village in Çavdır District of Burdur Province, Turkey. Its population is 1,125 (2021). Before the 2013 reorganisation, it was a town (belde). It is situated in the plateau to the west of Kozağacı Dam reservoir. The distance to Çavdır is 10 kilometres (6.2 mi). No document about the origin of the settlement exists. But as the name suggests, according to oral tradition Kozağacı was named after a walnut tree under which the first dwellings appeared. Main economic activity of the town is agriculture and cattle breeding. Also some residents work in cities.
