= Kağılcık, Karamanlı =

Village in Turkey

Kağılcık
- Village
- Location in Turkey
- Coordinates: 37°23′N 29°53′E
- Country: Turkey
- Province: Burdur
- District: Karamanlı
- Population (2021): 457
- Time zone: UTC+3 (TRT)

Kağılcık is a village in the Karamanlı District of Burdur Province in Turkey. Its population was 457 in 2021.
