= Burdur District =

District of Burdur Province, Turkey

- District
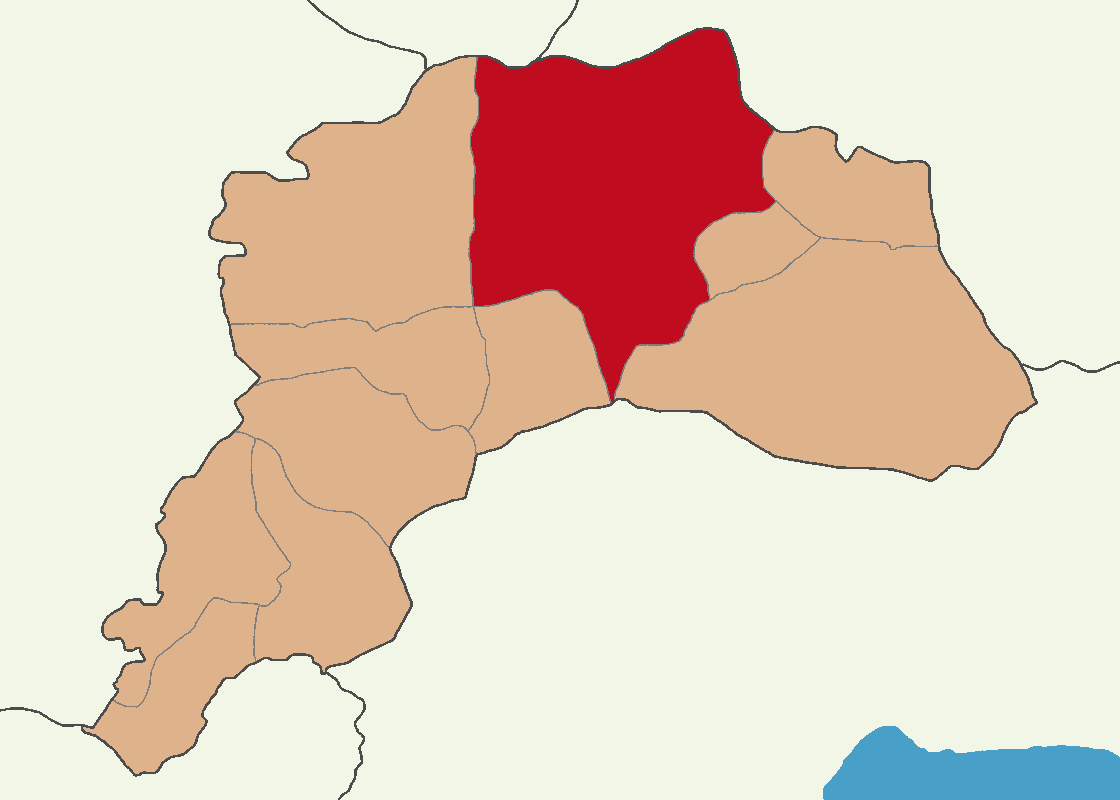
- Map showing Burdur District in Burdur Province

- Location in Turkey
- Coordinates: 37°43′N 30°17′E
- Country: Turkey
- Province: Burdur
- Seat: Burdur
- Area: 1,567 km^{2} (605 sq mi)
- Population (2021): 117,189
  - Density: 75/km^{2} (190/sq mi)
- Time zone: UTC+3 (TRT)

Burdur District (also: Merkez, meaning "central") is a district of the Burdur Province of Turkey. Its seat is the city of Burdur. Its area is 1,567 km^{2}, and its population is 117,189 (2021).

== Composition ==
There is one municipality in Burdur District:

- Burdur

There are 51 villages in Burdur District:

- Aksu
- Akyaka
- Akyayla
- Askeriye
- Aşağımüslümler
- Aziziye
- Başmakçı
- Bayındır
- Bereket
- Beşkavak
- Boğaziçi
- Bozlar
- Büğdüz
- Çallıca
- Çatağıl
- Çendik
- Cimbilli
- Çine
- Düğer
- Erikli
- Gökçebağ
- Günalan
- Güneyyayla
- Hacılar
- Halıcılar
- İğdeli
- İlyas
- Kapaklı
- Karacaören
- Karaçal
- Karakent
- Kartalpınar
- Kavacık
- Kayaaltı
- Kayış
- Kocapınar
- Kökez
- Kozluca
- Kumluca
- Kurna
- Kuruçay
- Sarıova
- Soğanlı
- Suludere
- Taşkapı
- Ulupınar
- Yarıköy
- Yassıgüme
- Yaylabeli
- Yazıköy
- Yeşildağ
