= Beşkavak, Burdur =

Village in Turkey

Beşkavak
- Village
- Location in Turkey
- Coordinates: 37.5773°N 30.3753°E
- Country: Turkey
- Province: Burdur
- District: Burdur
- Population (2021): 139
- Time zone: UTC+3 (TRT)

Beşkavak is a village in the Burdur District of Burdur Province in Turkey. Its population is 139 (2021).
