= Seydiler, Tefenni =

Village in Turkey

Seydiler
- Village
- Country: Turkey
- Province: Burdur
- District: Tefenni
- Population (2021): 132
- Time zone: UTC+3 (TRT)

Seydiler is a village in the Tefenni District of Burdur Province in Turkey. Its population is 132 (2021).
