= Belenli, Kemer =

Village in Turkey

Belenli
- Village
- Location in Turkey
- Coordinates: 37.3053°N 29.9968°E
- Country: Turkey
- Province: Burdur
- District: Kemer
- Population (2021): 388
- Time zone: UTC+3 (TRT)

Belenli is a village in the Kemer District of Burdur Province in Turkey. Its population is 388 (2021).
