= İshakköy, Çavdır =

Village in Turkey

İshakköy
- Village
- Location in Turkey
- Coordinates: 37°11′13″N 29°36′39″E
- Country: Turkey
- Province: Burdur
- District: Çavdır
- Population (2021): 177
- Time zone: UTC+3 (TRT)

İshakköy is a village in the Çavdır District of Burdur Province in Turkey. Its population is 177 (2021).
