= Manca, Karamanlı =

Village in Turkey

Manca
- Village
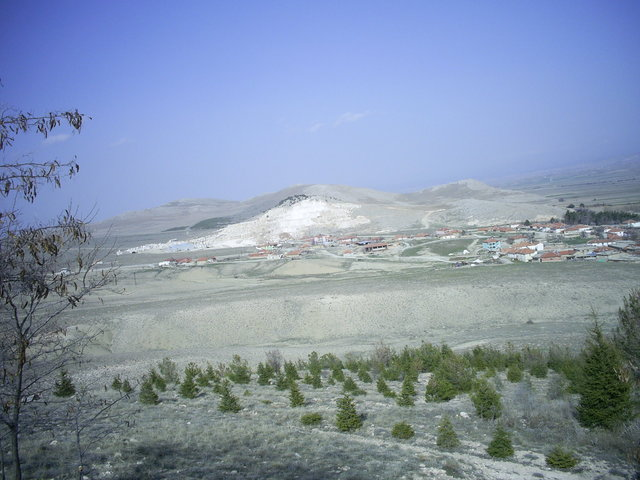
- Panoramic view of the village of Manca.

- Location within Turkey
- Coordinates: 37°18′26″N 29°53′16″E
- Country: Turkey
- Province: Burdur
- District: Karamanlı
- Population (2021): 285
- Time zone: UTC+3 (TRT)

Manca is a village in the Karamanlı District of Burdur Province in Turkey. Its population is 285 (2021).
