= Kılavuzlar, Karamanlı =

Village in Turkey

Kılavuzlar
- Village
- Location in Turkey
- Coordinates: 37°19′42″N 29°58′35″E
- Country: Turkey
- Province: Burdur
- District: Karamanlı
- Population (2021): 326
- Time zone: UTC+3 (TRT)

Kılavuzlar is a village in the Karamanlı District of Burdur Province in Turkey. Its population is 326 (2021).
