= Altınyayla, Burdur =

Altınyayla
- Municipality
- Location in Turkey
- Coordinates: 36°59′51″N 29°32′42″E
- Country: Turkey
- Province: Burdur
- District: Altınyayla

Government
  - Mayor: Ahmet Serttaş (AKP)
- Population (2021): 3,017
- Time zone: UTC+3 (TRT)
- Postal code: 15420
- Website: www.altınyayla.bel.tr

Altınyayla (formerly: Dirmil) is a town in Burdur Province in the Mediterranean region of Turkey. It is the seat of Altınyayla District. Its population is 3,017 (2021).
