= Çeltikçi =

- Municipality
- Location in Turkey
- Coordinates: 37°32′04″N 30°29′04″E
- Country: Turkey
- Province: Burdur
- District: Çeltikçi

Government
  - Mayor: Recep Aydın (MHP)
- Population (2021): 2,002
- Time zone: UTC+3 (TRT)
- Postal code: 15070
- Website: www.celtikci.bel.tr

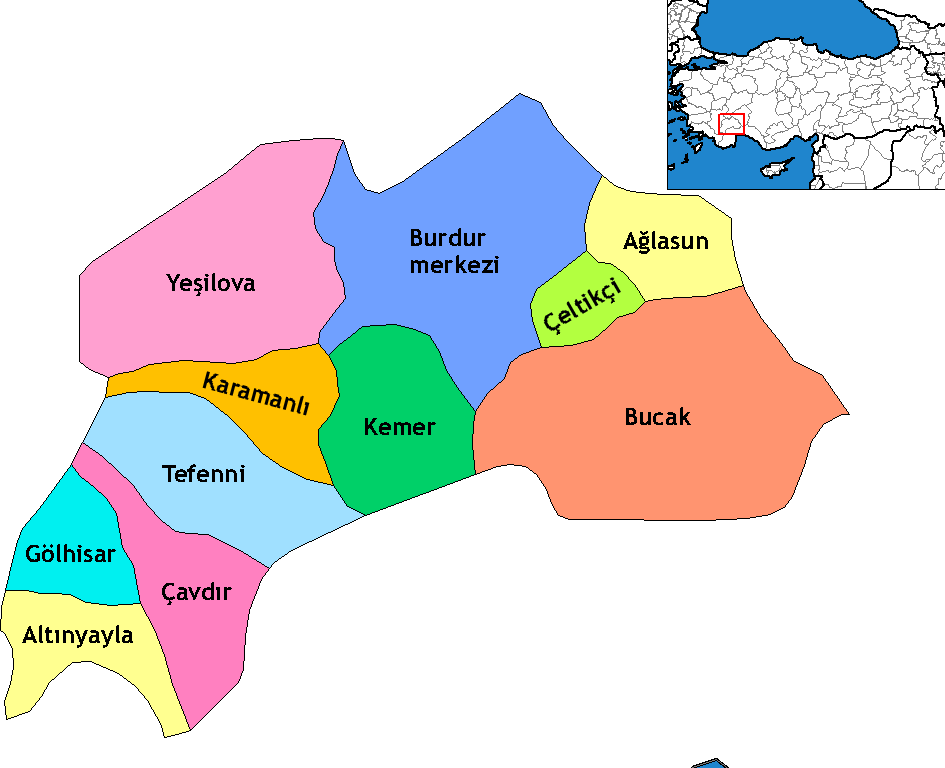
Municipalities of Burdur province

Çeltikçi is a town in Burdur Province in the Mediterranean region of Turkey. It is the seat of Çeltikçi District. Its population is 2,002 (2021).
