= Kocapınar, Burdur =

Village in Turkey

Kocapınar
- Village
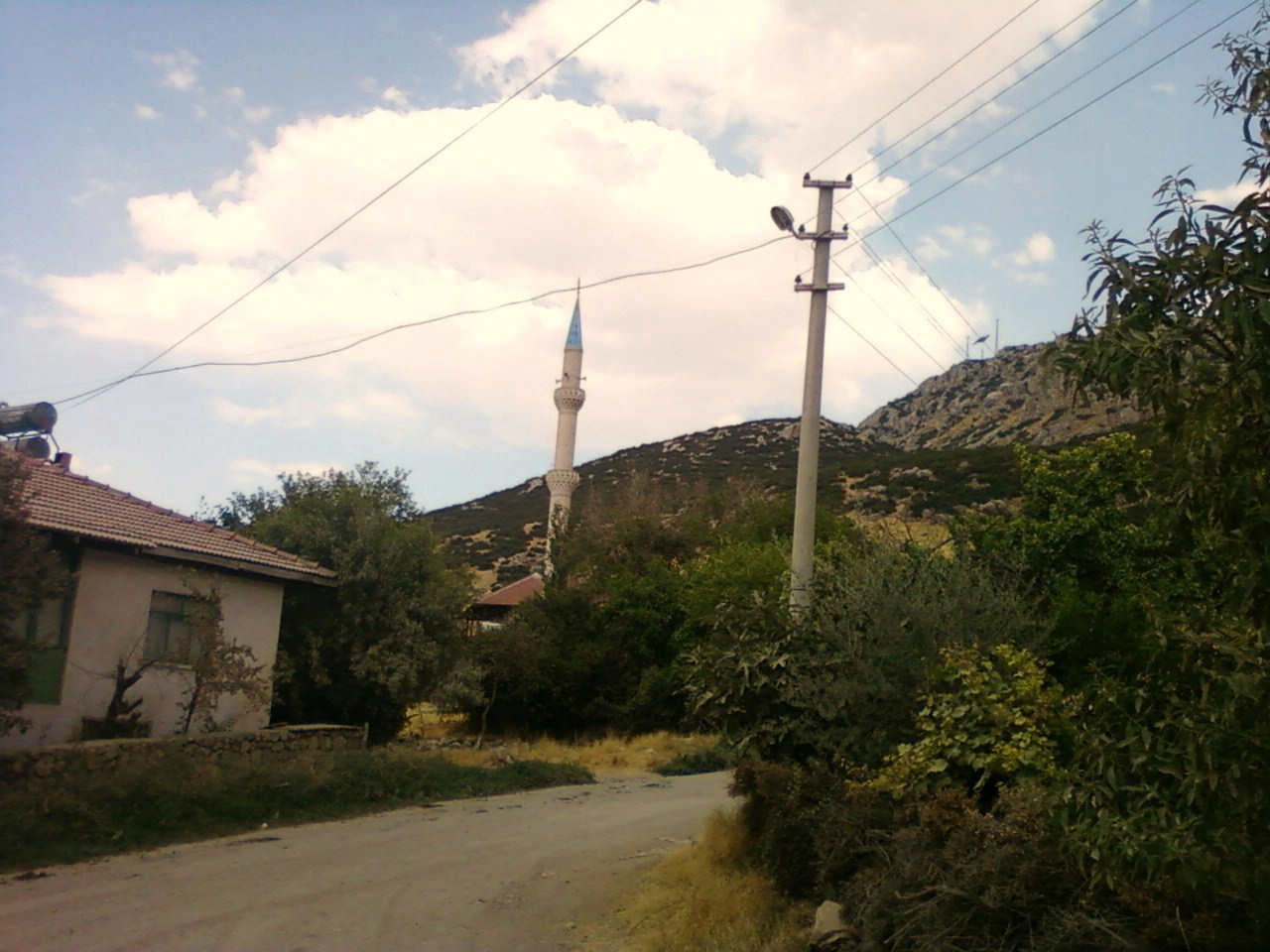

- Location within Turkey
- Country: Turkey
- Province: Burdur
- District: Burdur
- Population (2021): 280
- Time zone: UTC+3 (TRT)

Kocapınar is a village in the Burdur District of Burdur Province in Turkey. Its population is 280 (2021).
