= Kayı, Kemer =

Village in Turkey

Kayı
- Village
- Country: Turkey
- Province: Burdur
- District: Kemer
- Population (2021): 138
- Time zone: UTC+3 (TRT)

Kayı is a village in the Kemer District of Burdur Province in Turkey. In this village lies an ancient Kayı graveyard, from which the village derives its name. Its population is 138 (2021).
