= Ambarcık, Çavdır =

Village in Turkey

Ambarcık
- Village
- Location in Turkey
- Coordinates: 37.0473°N 29.6936°E
- Country: Turkey
- Province: Burdur
- District: Çavdır
- Population (2021): 377
- Time zone: UTC+3 (TRT)

Ambarcık (also: Anbarcık) is a village in the Çavdır District of Burdur Province in Turkey. Its population is 377 (2021).
