= Kızılyaka, Altınyayla =

Village in Turkey

Kızılyaka
- Village
- Country: Turkey
- Province: Burdur
- District: Altınyayla
- Population (2021): 864
- Time zone: UTC+3 (TRT)

Kızılyaka is a village in the Altınyayla District of Burdur Province in Turkey. Its population is 864 (2021).
