= Kayalıköy, Karamanlı =

Village in Turkey

Kayalıköy
- Village
- Country: Turkey
- Province: Burdur
- District: Karamanlı
- Population (2021): 87
- Time zone: UTC+3 (TRT)

Kayalıköy (also: Kayalı) is a village in the Karamanlı District of Burdur Province in Turkey. Its population is 87 (2021).
