= Kayacık, Çavdır =

Village in Turkey

Kayacık
- Village
- Country: Turkey
- Province: Burdur
- District: Çavdır
- Population (2021): 407
- Time zone: UTC+3 (TRT)

Kayacık is a village in the Çavdır District of Burdur Province in Turkey. Its population is 407 (2021).
