= Boğaziçi, Burdur =

Village in Turkey

Boğaziçi
- Village
- Location in Turkey
- Coordinates: 37.5166°N 30.0730°E
- Country: Turkey
- Province: Burdur
- District: Burdur
- Population (2021): 133
- Time zone: UTC+3 (TRT)

Boğaziçi is a village in the Burdur District of Burdur Province in Turkey. Its population is 133 (2021).
