= Kemer, Burdur =

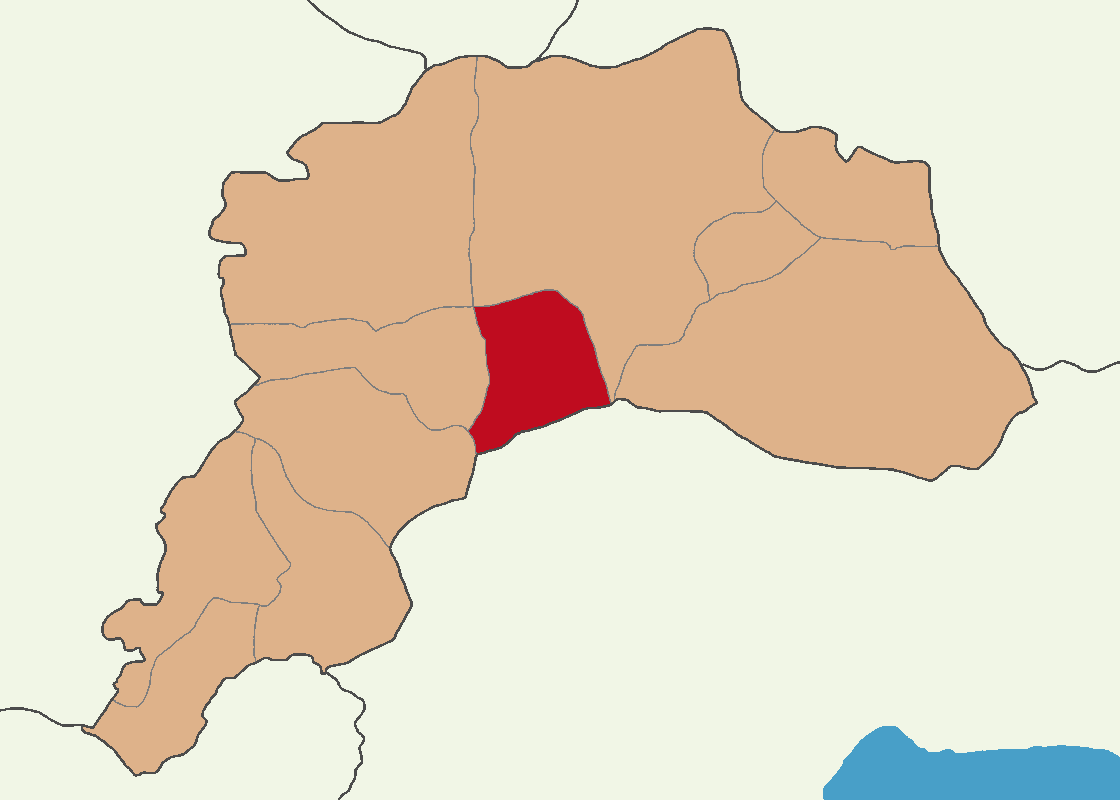

Kemer is a town in Burdur Province in the Mediterranean region of Turkey. It is the seat of Kemer District. Its population is 1,456 (2021). Kemer, 45 km away from Burdur city center, was established at the foothills of the Rahat Mountains. The first meeting of the Turks with the settlement, which bears traces of many civilizations from ancient times to the present, was in 1082 during the reign of the Anatolian Seljuk Ruler Suleiman Shah. With the dissolution of the Anatolian Seljuk State, the region came under the rule of the Hamitoğulları Principality and then the Ottoman Empire.

== History ==
The region came under the domination of Turkmen tribes. The former name of the village was Bebekler.

== Culture and values ==
Until this day the village lives by traditions and social norms rooted in the origins of the Turkmen tribes and Yörük lifestyle. In order to keep the Yoruk culture alive, the municipality organises highland festivals every year in the 3rd week of June.

In terms of values belonging to the village, customs and traditions have a great influence on the organisation of social life. In events such as birth and death, weddings, festivals, military and pilgrimage ceremonies are held in accordance with deep-rooted traditions.

== Economy ==
Kemer's economy is primarily based on agriculture and livestock farming. In recent years, highland (yayla) tourism has also become an increasingly important sector. The municipality has invested in accommodation facilities and related recreational infrastructure on the Asarcık Plateau (1,400 m) and the Akpınar Plateau (1,600 m).
