= Yazır, Çavdır =

Village in Turkey

Yazır
- Village
- Location in Turkey
- Coordinates: 37°02′07″N 29°45′12″E
- Country: Turkey
- Province: Burdur
- District: Çavdır
- Population (2021): 309
- Time zone: UTC+3 (TRT)

Yazır is a village in the Çavdır District of Burdur Province in Turkey. As of the 2021 Turkish census, Yazır had a population of 309.
