= Karamanlı District =

District of Burdur Province, Turkey

- District
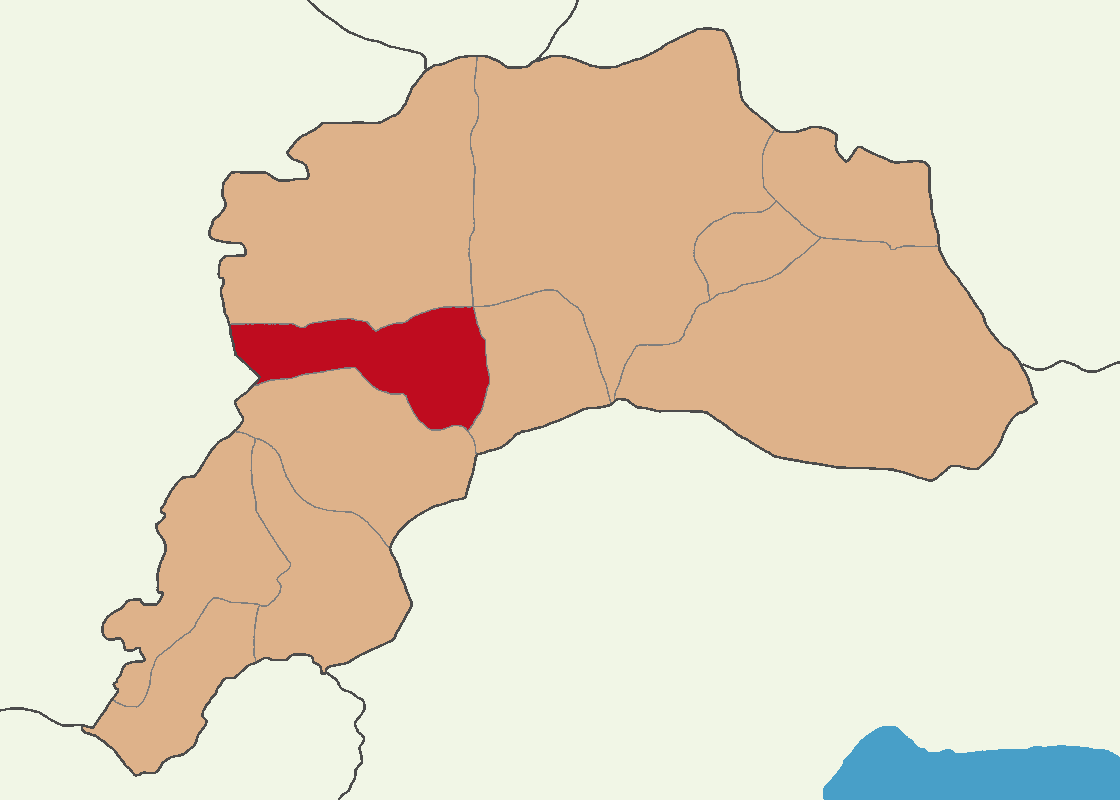
- Map showing Karamanlı District in Burdur Province

- Location in Turkey
- Coordinates: 37°22′N 29°49′E
- Country: Turkey
- Province: Burdur
- Seat: Karamanlı

Government
  - Kaymakam: Emirhan Arıkan
- Area: 372 km^{2} (144 sq mi)
- Population (2021): 8,268
  - Density: 22/km^{2} (58/sq mi)
- Time zone: UTC+3 (TRT)
- Website: www.karamanli.gov.tr

Karamanlı District is a district of the Burdur Province of Turkey. Its seat is the town of Karamanlı. Its area is 372 km^{2}, and its population is 8,268 (2021).

== Composition ==
There is one municipality in Karamanlı District:

- Karamanlı

There are 8 villages in Karamanlı District:

- Bademli
- Dereköy
- Kağılcık
- Kayalıköy
- Kılavuzlar
- Kılçan
- Manca
- Mürseller
