= Aşağımüslümler, Burdur =

Village in Turkey

Aşağımüslümler
- Village
- Location in Turkey
- Coordinates: 37.6187°N 30.0143°E
- Country: Turkey
- Province: Burdur
- District: Burdur
- Population (2021): 193
- Time zone: UTC+3 (TRT)

Aşağımüslümler is a village in the Burdur District of Burdur Province in Turkey. Its population is 193 (2021).
