= Kuruçay, Burdur =

Village in Turkey

Kuruçay
- Village
- Country: Turkey
- Province: Burdur
- District: Burdur
- Population (2021): 234
- Time zone: UTC+3 (TRT)

Kuruçay is a village in the Burdur District of Burdur Province in Turkey. Its population is 234 (2021).
