= Yassıgüme, Burdur =

Village in Turkey

Yassıgüme
- Village
- Location in Turkey
- Coordinates: 37°36′N 30°07′E
- Country: Turkey
- Province: Burdur
- District: Burdur
- Population (2021): 493
- Time zone: UTC+3 (TRT)

Yassıgüme is a village in the Burdur District of Burdur Province in Turkey. Its population is 493 (2021).
