= Soğanlı, Burdur =

Village in Turkey

Soğanlı
- Village
- Location in Turkey
- Coordinates: 37°34′9″N 30°14′37″E
- Country: Turkey
- Province: Burdur
- District: Burdur
- Population (2021): 112
- Time zone: UTC+3 (TRT)

Soğanlı is a village in the Burdur District of Burdur Province in Turkey. Its population is 112 (2021).
