= Aksu, Burdur =

Village in Turkey

Aksu
- Village
- Location in Turkey
- Coordinates: 37.5081°N 30.3139°E
- Country: Turkey
- Province: Burdur
- District: Burdur
- Population (2021): 26
- Time zone: UTC+3 (TRT)

Aksu is a village in the Burdur District of Burdur Province in Turkey. Its population is 26 (2021).
