= Karakent, Burdur =

Village in Turkey

Karakent
- Village
- Location in Turkey
- Coordinates: 37°41′47″N 30°3′50″E
- Country: Turkey
- Province: Burdur
- District: Burdur
- Population (2021): 287
- Time zone: UTC+3 (TRT)

Karakent is a village in the Burdur District of Burdur Province in Turkey. Its population is 287 (2021). Situated near the western shore of Lake Burdur, it was the location of the ancient Pisidian town Lysinia.
