= Bölmepınar, Çavdır =

Village in Turkey

Bölmepınar
- Village
- Location in Turkey
- Coordinates: 37.1097°N 29.7747°E
- Country: Turkey
- Province: Burdur
- District: Çavdır
- Population (2021): 691
- Time zone: UTC+3 (TRT)

Bölmepınar is a village in the Çavdır District of Burdur Province in Turkey. Its population is 691 (2021).
