= İğdeli, Burdur =

Village in Turkey

İğdeli
- Village
- Country: Turkey
- Province: Burdur
- District: Burdur
- Population (2021): 165
- Time zone: UTC+3 (TRT)

İğdeli is a village in the Burdur District of Burdur Province in Turkey. Its population is 165 (2021).
