= Akyaka, Burdur =

Village in Turkey

Akyaka
- Village
- Location in Turkey
- Coordinates: 37.6204°N 30.1618°E
- Country: Turkey
- Province: Burdur
- District: Burdur
- Population (2021): 184
- Time zone: UTC+3 (TRT)

Akyaka is a village in the Burdur District of Burdur Province in Turkey. Its population is 184 (2021).
