= Kozağaç =

Kozağaç (literally "walnut tree" in Turkish) may refer to the following places in Turkey:

- Kozağaç, Beypazarı, a village in the district of Beypazarı, Ankara Province
- Kozağaç, Kahta, a village in the district of Kahta, Adıyaman Province
- Kozağaç, Serik, a village in the district of Serik, Antalya Province

== See also ==
- Kozağacı (disambiguation), different form of the same word
