= Bozlar, Burdur =

Village in Turkey

Bozlar
- Village
- Location in Turkey
- Coordinates: 37.3998°N 30.2298°E
- Country: Turkey
- Province: Burdur
- District: Burdur
- Population (2021): 90
- Time zone: UTC+3 (TRT)

Bozlar is a village in the Burdur District of Burdur Province in Turkey. Its population is 90 (2021).
