= İlyas, Burdur =

Village in Turkey

İlyas
- Village
- Country: Turkey
- Province: Burdur
- District: Burdur
- Population (2021): 556
- Time zone: UTC+3 (TRT)

İlyas (also: İlyasköy) is a village in the Burdur District of Burdur Province in Turkey. Its population is 556 (2021).
