= Güneyyayla, Burdur =

Village in Turkey

Güneyyayla
- Village
- Country: Turkey
- Province: Burdur
- District: Burdur
- Population (2021): 267
- Time zone: UTC+3 (TRT)

Güneyyayla is a village in the Burdur District of Burdur Province in Turkey. Its population is 267 (2021).
