= Asmabağ, Altınyayla =

Village in Turkey

Asmabağ
- Village
- Location in Turkey
- Coordinates: 36°59′N 29°30′E
- Country: Turkey
- Province: Burdur
- District: Altınyayla
- Population (2021): 241
- Time zone: UTC+3 (TRT)

Asmabağ is a village in the Altınyayla District of Burdur Province in Turkey. Its population is 241 (2021).
