= Çatak, Altınyayla =

Village in Turkey

Çatak
- Village
- Location in Turkey
- Coordinates: 37.0011°N 29.5261°E
- Country: Turkey
- Province: Burdur
- District: Altınyayla
- Population (2021): 554
- Time zone: UTC+3 (TRT)

Çatak is a village in the Altınyayla District of Burdur Province in Turkey. Its population is 554 (2021).
