= Dereköy, Karamanlı =

Village in Turkey

Dereköy
- Village
- Country: Turkey
- Province: Burdur
- District: Karamanlı
- Population (2021): 175
- Time zone: UTC+3 (TRT)

Dereköy is a village in the Karamanlı District of Burdur Province in Turkey. Its population is 175 (2021).
