= Karamanlı, Burdur =

Karamanlı
- Municipality
- Location in Turkey
- Coordinates: 37°22′12″N 29°49′16″E
- Country: Turkey
- Province: Burdur
- District: Karamanlı

Government
  - Mayor: Fatih Selimoğlu (AKP)
- Population (2024): 8,223
- Time zone: UTC+3 (TRT)
- Website: www.karamanli.bel.tr

Karamanlı is a town in Burdur Province in the Mediterranean region of Turkey. It is the seat of Karamanlı District. Its population is 6,157 (2021).
