= Çavdır District =

District of Burdur Province, Turkey

- District
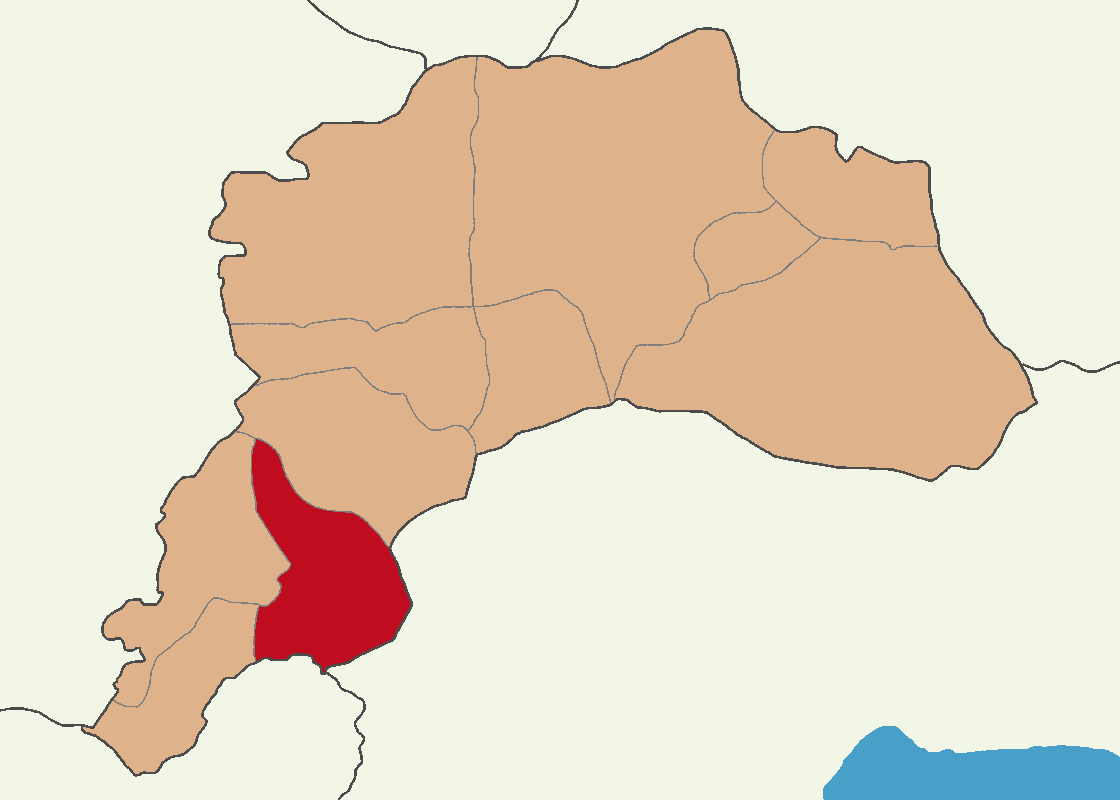
- Map showing ÇavdırDistrict in Burdur Province

- Location in Turkey
- Coordinates: 37°09′N 29°42′E
- Country: Turkey
- Province: Burdur
- Seat: Çavdır

Government
  - Kaymakam: Mustafa Gövercin
- Area: 482 km^{2} (186 sq mi)
- Population (2024): 12,741
  - Density: 26/km^{2} (68/sq mi)
- Time zone: UTC+3 (TRT)
- Website: www.cavdir.gov.tr

Çavdır District is a district of the Burdur Province of Turkey. Its seat is the town of Çavdır. Its area is 482 km^{2}, and its population is 12,599 (2021).

== Composition ==
There are two municipalities in Çavdır District:

- Çavdır
- Söğüt

There are 10 villages in Çavdır District:

- Ambarcık
- Bölmepınar
- Büyükalan
- İshakköy
- Karaköy
- Kayacık
- Kızıllar
- Kozağacı
- Küçükalan
- Yazır
