= Yarıköy, Burdur =

Village in Turkey

Yarıköy
- Village
- Location in Turkey
- Coordinates: 37°38′N 30°04′E
- Country: Turkey
- Province: Burdur
- District: Burdur
- Population (2021): 371
- Time zone: UTC+3 (TRT)

Yarıköy is a village in the Burdur District of Burdur Province in Turkey. It had a population of 371 in 2021.
