= Pınarbaşı, Kemer =

Village in Turkey

Pınarbaşı
- Village
- Country: Turkey
- Province: Burdur
- District: Kemer
- Population (2021): 134
- Time zone: UTC+3 (TRT)

Pınarbaşı is a village in the Kemer District of Burdur Province in Turkey. Its population is 134 (2021).
