= Kapaklı, Burdur =

Village in Turkey

Kapaklı
- Village
- Country: Turkey
- Province: Burdur
- District: Burdur
- Population (2021): 86
- Time zone: UTC+3 (TRT)

Kapaklı is a village in the Burdur District of Burdur Province in Turkey. Its population is 86 (2021).
