= Gökçebağ, Burdur =

Village in Turkey

Gökçebağ
- Village
- Location in Turkey
- Coordinates: 37°46′55″N 30°22′44″E
- Country: Turkey
- Province: Burdur
- District: Burdur
- Population (2021): 1,215
- Time zone: UTC+3 (TRT)

Gökçebağ is a village in the Burdur District of Burdur Province in Turkey. Its population is 1,215 (2021).
