= Akören, Kemer =

Village in Turkey

Akören
- Village
- Location in Turkey
- Coordinates: 37.4122°N 30.0785°E
- Country: Turkey
- Province: Burdur
- District: Kemer
- Population (2021): 207
- Time zone: UTC+3 (TRT)

Akören is a village in the Kemer District of Burdur Province in Turkey. Its population is 207 (2021).
