= Halıcılar, Burdur =

Village in Turkey

Halıcılar
- Village
- Location in Turkey
- Coordinates: 37°42′N 30°24′E
- Country: Turkey
- Province: Burdur
- District: Burdur
- Population (2021): 1,440
- Time zone: UTC+3 (TRT)

Halıcılar is a village in the Burdur District of Burdur Province in Turkey. Its population is 1,440 (2021).
