= Kemer District, Burdur =

District of Burdur Province, Turkey

Kemer District
- District
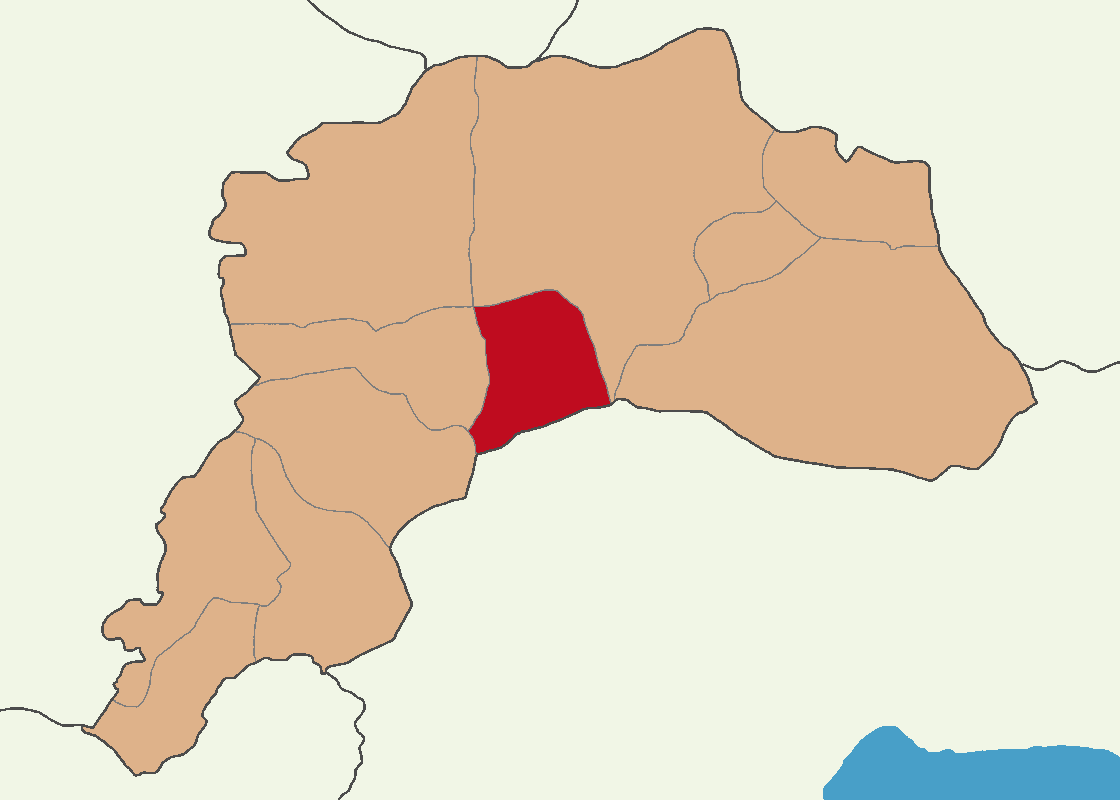
- Map showing Kemer District in Burdur Province

- Location in Turkey
- Coordinates: 37°21′N 30°03′E
- Country: Turkey
- Province: Burdur
- Seat: Kemer

Government
  - Kaymakam: Armağan Yazıcı
- Area: 373 km^{2} (144 sq mi)
- Population (2024): 2,814
  - Density: 7.5/km^{2} (20/sq mi)
- Time zone: UTC+3 (TRT)
- Website: www.burdurkemer.gov.tr

Kemer District is a district of the Burdur Province of Turkey. Its seat is the town of Kemer. Its area is 373 km^{2}, and its population is 3,000 (2021).

== Composition ==
There is one municipality in Kemer District:

- Kemer

There are 7 villages in Kemer District:

- Akçaören
- Akören
- Belenli
- Elmacık
- Kayı
- Pınarbaşı
- Yakalar
