= Küçükalan, Çavdır =

Village in Turkey

Küçükalan
- Village
- Location in Turkey
- Coordinates: 37°15′N 29°36′E
- Country: Turkey
- Province: Burdur
- District: Çavdır
- Population (2021): 331
- Time zone: UTC+3 (TRT)

Küçükalan is a village in the Çavdır District of Burdur Province in Turkey. Its population is 331 (2021).
