= Elmacık, Kemer =

Village in Turkey

Elmacık
- Village
- Country: Turkey
- Province: Burdur
- District: Kemer
- Population (2021): 243
- Time zone: UTC+3 (TRT)

Elmacık is a small rural village in the Kemer District of Burdur Province in Turkey. Its population is 243 (2021).

The coordinates of Elmacık are 37.47306° N, 30.10639° E.

== Geography ==
Located in the southwestern part of the country, situated near the foothills and surrounded by agricultural land. Located beside the Elmacık Stream.

== Language ==
The language spoken in Elmacık is Turkish.

== Attractions ==
Nature History Museum, which showcases exhibits such as a massive elephant skeleton and remains of prehistoric creatures.
