= Başmakçı, Burdur =

Village in Turkey

Başmakçı
- Village
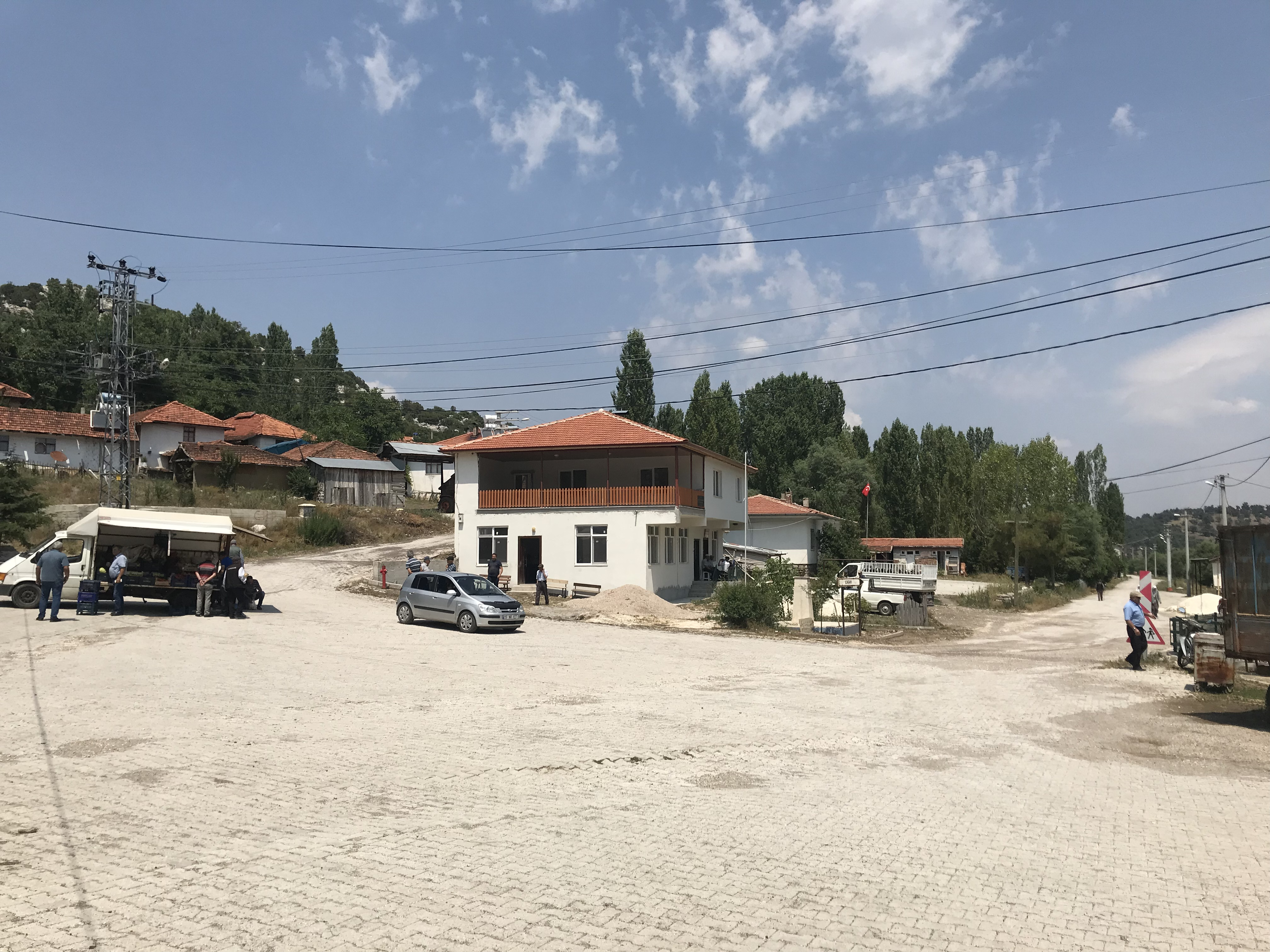

- Location within Turkey
- Coordinates: 37.7748°N 30.0103°E
- Country: Turkey
- Province: Burdur
- District: Burdur
- Population (2021): 240
- Time zone: UTC+3 (TRT)

Başmakçı is a village in the Burdur District of Burdur Province in Turkey. Its population is 240 (2021).
