= Yuvalak, Tefenni =

Village in Turkey

Yuvalak
- Village
- Location in Turkey
- Coordinates: 37°17′17″N 29°45′48″E
- Country: Turkey
- Province: Burdur
- District: Tefenni
- Population (2021): 88
- Time zone: UTC+3 (TRT)

Yuvalak is a village in the Tefenni District of Burdur Province in Turkey. Its population is 88 (2021).
