= Altınyayla District, Burdur =

District of Burdur Province, Turkey

Altınyayla District
- District
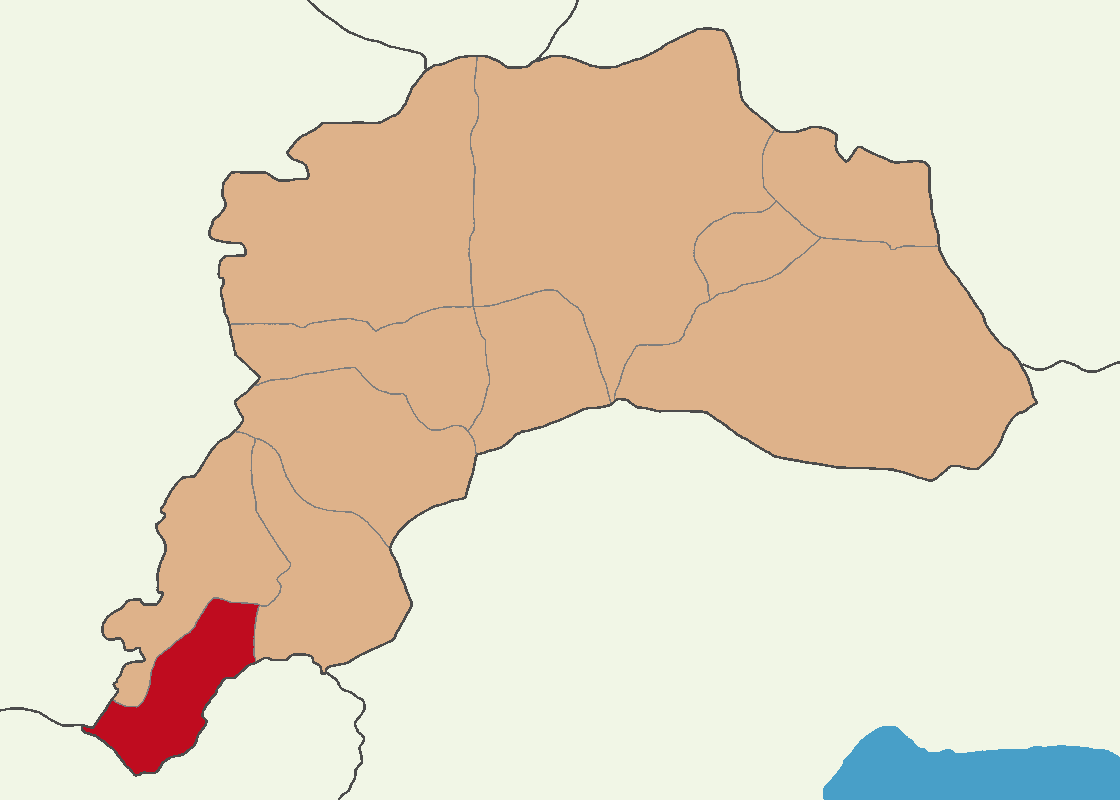
- Map showing Altınyayla District in Burdur Province

- Location in Turkey
- Coordinates: 37°00′N 29°33′E
- Country: Turkey
- Province: Burdur
- Seat: Altınyayla

Government
  - Kaymakam: Ertuğrul Aslan
- Area: 221 km^{2} (85 sq mi)
- Population (2024): 5,120
  - Density: 23/km^{2} (60/sq mi)
- Time zone: UTC+3 (TRT)
- Website: www.burduraltinyayla.gov.tr

Altınyayla District is a district of the Burdur Province of Turkey. Its seat is the town of Altınyayla. Its area is 221 km^{2}, and its population is 5,335 (2021).

== Composition ==
There is one municipality in Altınyayla District:

- Altınyayla

There are 5 villages in Altınyayla District:

- Asmabağ
- Ballık
- Çatak
- Çörten
- Kızılyaka
