= Büğdüz, Burdur =

Büğdüz
- Village
- Location in Turkey
- Coordinates: 37°37′3″N 30°16′56″E
- Country: Turkey
- Province: Burdur
- District: Burdur
- Population (2021): 1,538
- Time zone: UTC+3 (TRT)

Büğdüz is a village in the Burdur District of Burdur Province in Turkey. Its population is 1,538 (2021). Before the 2013 reorganisation, it was a town (belde).
