= Bayındır, Burdur =

Village in Turkey

Bayındır
- Village
- Location in Turkey
- Coordinates: 37.6356°N 30.3242°E
- Country: Turkey
- Province: Burdur
- District: Burdur
- Population (2021): 392
- Time zone: UTC+3 (TRT)

Bayındır is a village in the Burdur District of Burdur Province in Turkey. Its population is 392 (2021).
