= Çeltikçi District =

District of Burdur Province, Turkey

- District
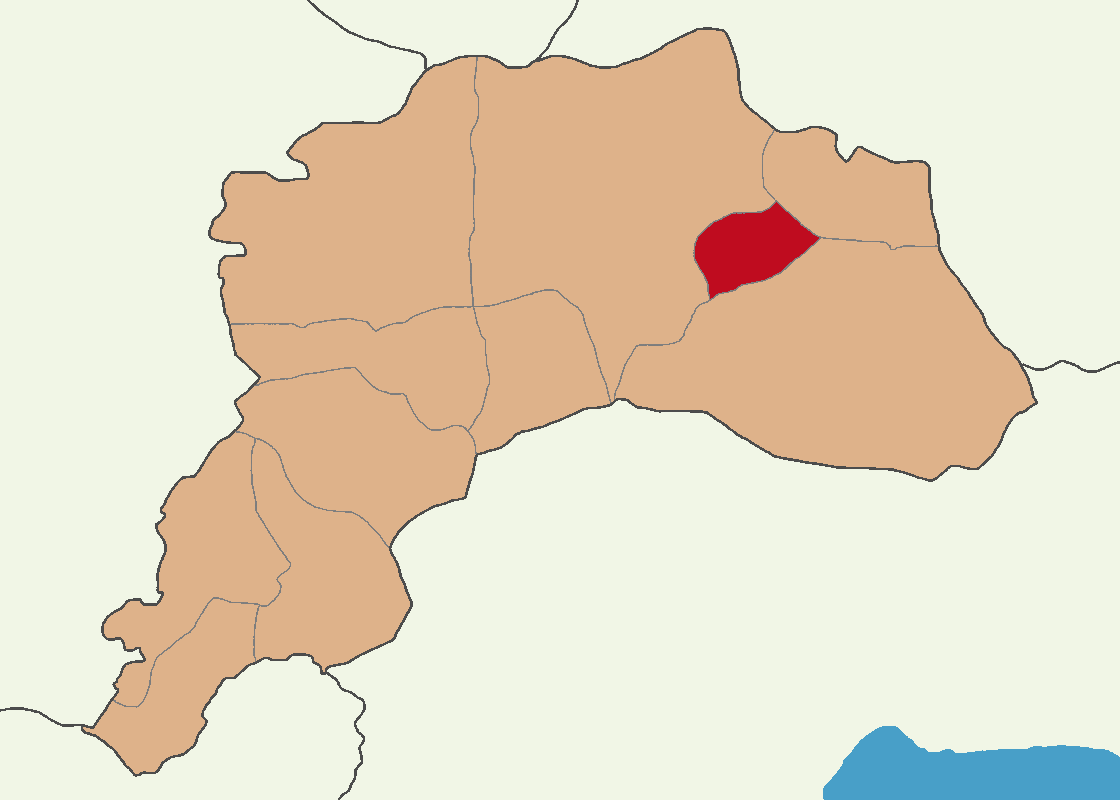
- Map showing Çeltikçi District in Burdur Province

- Location in Turkey
- Coordinates: 37°32′N 30°29′E
- Country: Turkey
- Province: Burdur
- Seat: Çeltikçi

Government
  - Kaymakam: Eda Nur Yurt
- Area: 161 km^{2} (62 sq mi)
- Population (2024): 4,898
  - Density: 30/km^{2} (79/sq mi)
- Time zone: UTC+3 (TRT)
- Website: www.celtikci.gov.tr

Çeltikçi District is a district of the Burdur Province of Turkey. Its seat is the town of Çeltikçi. Its area is 161 km^{2}, and its population is 4,936 (2021).

== Composition ==
There is one municipality in Çeltikçi District:

- Çeltikçi

There are 6 villages in Çeltikçi District:

- Bağsaray
- Çebiş
- Güvenli
- Kuzköy
- Ovacık
- Tekkeköy
