= Kızıllar, Çavdır =

Village in Turkey

Kızıllar
- Village
- Location in Turkey
- Coordinates: 37.0727°N 29.7097°E
- Country: Turkey
- Province: Burdur
- District: Çavdır
- Population (2021): 433
- Time zone: UTC+3 (TRT)

Kızıllar is a village in the Çavdır District of Burdur Province in Turkey. Its population is 433 (2021).
