= Çavdır Dam =

Coordinates: 37.0721°N 29.7296°E

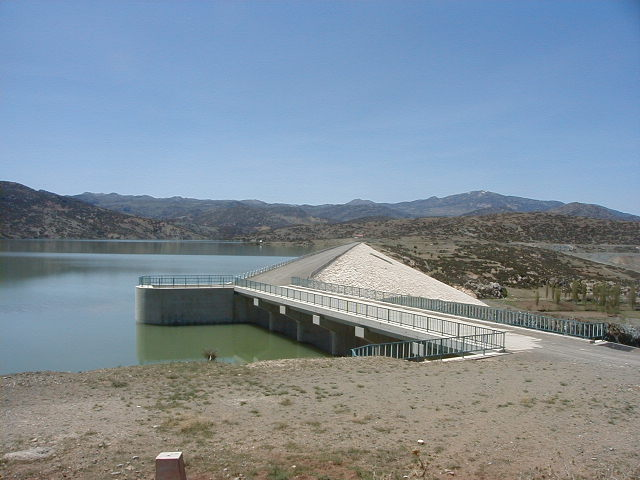
- Location: Burdur, Turkey
- Purpose: Irrigation and industrial water
- Status: Operational
- Construction began: 1993
- Opening date: 1996

Dam and spillways
- Type of dam: Rockfill dam
- Height (foundation): 60 m
- Dam volume: 2,572,000 m^{3}

Reservoir
- Catchment area: 36,000,000 m^{3}
- Surface area: 2 km^{2}

Çavdır Dam is a dam in Burdur, Turkey. The development was backed by the Turkish State Hydraulic Works. The dam was constructed from 1993 to 1996.

== See also ==
- List of dams and reservoirs in Turkey
