= Kozluca, Burdur =

Kozluca
- Village
- Location within Turkey
- Coordinates: 37°30′N 30°08′E
- Country: Turkey
- Province: Burdur
- District: Burdur
- Elevation: 1,110 m (3,640 ft)
- Population (2021): 1,042
- Time zone: UTC+3 (TRT)
- Postal code: 15110
- Area code: 0248

Kozluca is a village in Burdur District of Burdur Province, Turkey. Its population is 1,042 (2021). Before the 2013 reorganisation, it was a town (belde). Kozluca is situated 45 kilometres (28 mi) to the south of Burdur.

== History ==
The area around Kozluca was populated during the Roman Empire era. According to mayor's page the epigraph on a pedestal around the town reads the Roman Emperor honoured the governor of the town by a sculpture . Towards the end of Seljukids, the settlement was founded by Mahmut Bey of Hamidoğlu beylik (principality). Later during Ottoman Empire era, the efforts of a local leader named Gozulcalıoğlu helped to flourish the settlement and the settlement was named after him. In 1968, the settlement was declared a seat of township.

== Economy ==
Main economic activity is cattle breeding and dairying. Daily milk production is about 12 tons. The agricultural crops are mostly fodder plants.
