= Yaylabeli, Burdur =

Village in Turkey

Yaylabeli
- Village
- Location in Turkey
- Coordinates: 37.6805°N 30.0155°E
- Country: Turkey
- Province: Burdur
- District: Burdur
- Population (2021): 176
- Time zone: UTC+3 (TRT)

Yaylabeli is a village in the Burdur District of Burdur Province in Turkey. Its population is 176 (2021).
