= Tefenni =

- Municipality
- Location in Turkey
- Coordinates: 37°18′40″N 29°46′28″E
- Country: Turkey
- Province: Burdur
- District: Tefenni

Government
  - Mayor: Ümit Alagöz (Victory Party)
- Elevation: 1,165 m (3,822 ft)
- Population (2021): 7,381
- Time zone: UTC+3 (TRT)
- Postal code: 15600
- Website: www.tefenni.bel.tr

Tefenni is a town in Burdur Province in the Mediterranean region of Turkey. It is the seat of Tefenni District. Its population is 7,381 (2021). It consists of 10 quarters: Kır, Yenice, Yokuş, Zafer, Esentepe, Eceköy, Eşeler, Fatih, Pazar and Göktürk.

== Climate ==
Tefenni has a hot-summer Mediterranean climate (Köppen: Csa), with hot, dry summers, and cool winters.

Climate data for Tefenni (1991–2020)
Month	Jan	Feb	Mar	Apr	May	Jun	Jul	Aug	Sep	Oct	Nov	Dec	Year
Mean daily maximum °C (°F)	6.6 (43.9)	8.6 (47.5)	12.9 (55.2)	17.5 (63.5)	22.7 (72.9)	27.6 (81.7)	31.6 (88.9)	31.8 (89.2)	27.4 (81.3)	21.2 (70.2)	14.0 (57.2)	8.1 (46.6)	19.2 (66.6)
Daily mean °C (°F)	1.2 (34.2)	2.7 (36.9)	6.2 (43.2)	10.5 (50.9)	15.4 (59.7)	19.9 (67.8)	23.5 (74.3)	23.4 (74.1)	19.0 (66.2)	13.4 (56.1)	7.2 (45.0)	2.8 (37.0)	12.1 (53.8)
Mean daily minimum °C (°F)	−2.7 (27.1)	−1.9 (28.6)	0.7 (33.3)	4.5 (40.1)	8.7 (47.7)	12.4 (54.3)	15.4 (59.7)	15.5 (59.9)	11.5 (52.7)	7.2 (45.0)	2.1 (35.8)	−1.0 (30.2)	6.1 (43.0)
Average precipitation mm (inches)	58.76 (2.31)	49.14 (1.93)	43.52 (1.71)	41.73 (1.64)	42.94 (1.69)	30.64 (1.21)	15.12 (0.60)	19.44 (0.77)	15.66 (0.62)	33.91 (1.34)	48.39 (1.91)	66.57 (2.62)	465.82 (18.34)
Average precipitation days (≥ 1.0 mm)	7.2	6.6	6.1	6.2	6.5	3.7	2.7	3.0	3.0	4.0	5.1	7.7	61.8
Average relative humidity (%)	73.6	69.1	62.0	58.6	56.4	50.9	43.6	44.7	48.9	58.9	66.1	74.6	58.9
Source: NOAA
