= Günalan, Burdur =

Village in Turkey

Günalan
- Village
- Country: Turkey
- Province: Burdur
- District: Burdur
- Population (2021): 311
- Time zone: UTC+3 (TRT)

Günalan is a village in the Burdur District of Burdur Province in Turkey. Its name was recorded as Lengüme in the 1925 records. Its population is 311 (2021).
