= Mürseller, Karamanlı =

Village in Turkey

Mürseller
- Village
- Country: Turkey
- Province: Burdur
- District: Karamanlı
- Population (2021): 267
- Time zone: UTC+3 (TRT)

Mürseller is a village in the Karamanlı District of Burdur Province in Turkey. Its population is 267 (2021).
