= Akyayla, Burdur =

Village in Turkey

Akyayla
- Village
- Location in Turkey
- Coordinates: 37.5053°N 30.3324°E
- Country: Turkey
- Province: Burdur
- District: Burdur
- Population (2021): 197
- Time zone: UTC+3 (TRT)

Akyayla is a village in the Burdur District of Burdur Province in Turkey. Its population is 197 (2021).
