= Belkaya, Tefenni =

Village in Turkey

Belkaya
- Village
- Location in Turkey
- Coordinates: 37.3105°N 29.6034°E
- Country: Turkey
- Province: Burdur
- District: Tefenni
- Population (2021): 102
- Time zone: UTC+3 (TRT)

Belkaya is a village in the Tefenni District of Burdur Province in Turkey. Its population is 102 (2021).
