= Ballık, Altınyayla =

Village in Turkey

Ballık
- Village
- Location in Turkey
- Coordinates: 36.8774°N 29.4270°E
- Country: Turkey
- Province: Burdur
- District: Altınyayla
- Population (2021): 376
- Time zone: UTC+3 (TRT)

Ballık is a village in the Altınyayla District of Burdur Province in Turkey. Its population is 376 (2021).
