= Çavdır =

- Municipality
- Location in Turkey
- Coordinates: 37°09′18″N 29°41′38″E
- Country: Turkey
- Province: Burdur
- District: Çavdır

Government
  - Mayor: Süleyman Kayacan (MHP)
- Elevation: 1,021 m (3,350 ft)
- Population (2021): 4,950
- Time zone: UTC+3 (TRT)
- Postal code: 15900
- Website: www.cavdir.bel.tr

Çavdır (Turkish: [ˈtʃavdɯɾ]) is a town in Burdur Province in the Mediterranean region of Turkey. It is the seat of Çavdır District. Its population is 4,950 (2021).
