= Tefenni District =

District of Burdur Province, Turkey

- District
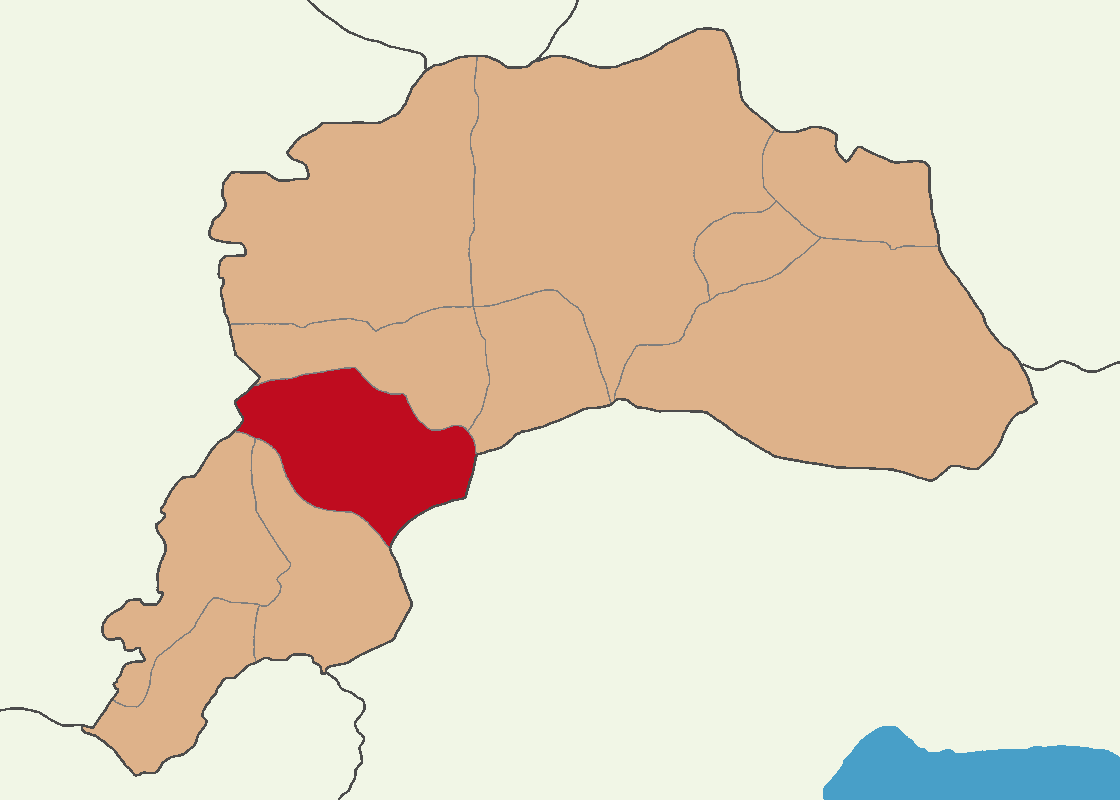
- Map showing Tefenni District in Burdur Province

- Location in Turkey
- Coordinates: 37°19′N 29°46′E
- Country: Turkey
- Province: Burdur
- Seat: Tefenni

Government
  - Kaymakam: Tugay Cantürk
- Area: 582 km^{2} (225 sq mi)
- Population (2021): 10,744
  - Density: 18.5/km^{2} (47.8/sq mi)
- Time zone: UTC+3 (TRT)
- Website: www.tefenni.gov.tr

Tefenni District is a district of the Burdur Province of Turkey. Its seat is the town of Tefenni. Its area is 582 km^{2}, and its population is 10,744 (2021).

== Composition ==
There is one municipality in Tefenni District:

- Tefenni

There are 13 villages in Tefenni District:

- Başpınar
- Bayramlar
- Belkaya
- Beyköy
- Çaylı
- Hasanpaşa
- Karamusa
- Sazak
- Seydiler
- Yaylaköy
- Yeşilköy
- Yuva
- Yuvalak
