= Bereket, Burdur =

Village in Turkey

Bereket
- Village
- Location in Turkey
- Coordinates: 37.5468°N 30.2826°E
- Country: Turkey
- Province: Burdur
- District: Burdur
- Population (2021): 131
- Time zone: UTC+3 (TRT)

Bereket is a village in the Burdur District of Burdur Province in Turkey. Its population is 131 (2021).
