= Çörten, Altınyayla =

Village in Turkey

Çörten
- Village
- Country: Turkey
- Province: Burdur
- District: Altınyayla
- Population (2021): 283
- Time zone: UTC+3 (TRT)

Çörten is a village in the Altınyayla District of Burdur Province in Turkey. Its population is 283 (2021).
