= Kozağacı Dam =

- Location: Turkey
- Coordinates: 37.0258°N 29.6357°E

Kozağacı Dam is a dam in Turkey. The development was backed by the Turkish State Hydraulic Works.

== See also ==
- List of dams and reservoirs in Turkey
