= Burdur Province =

Province of Turkey

Coordinates: 37°25′26″N 30°05′04″E

Burdur Province Burdur ili
- Province
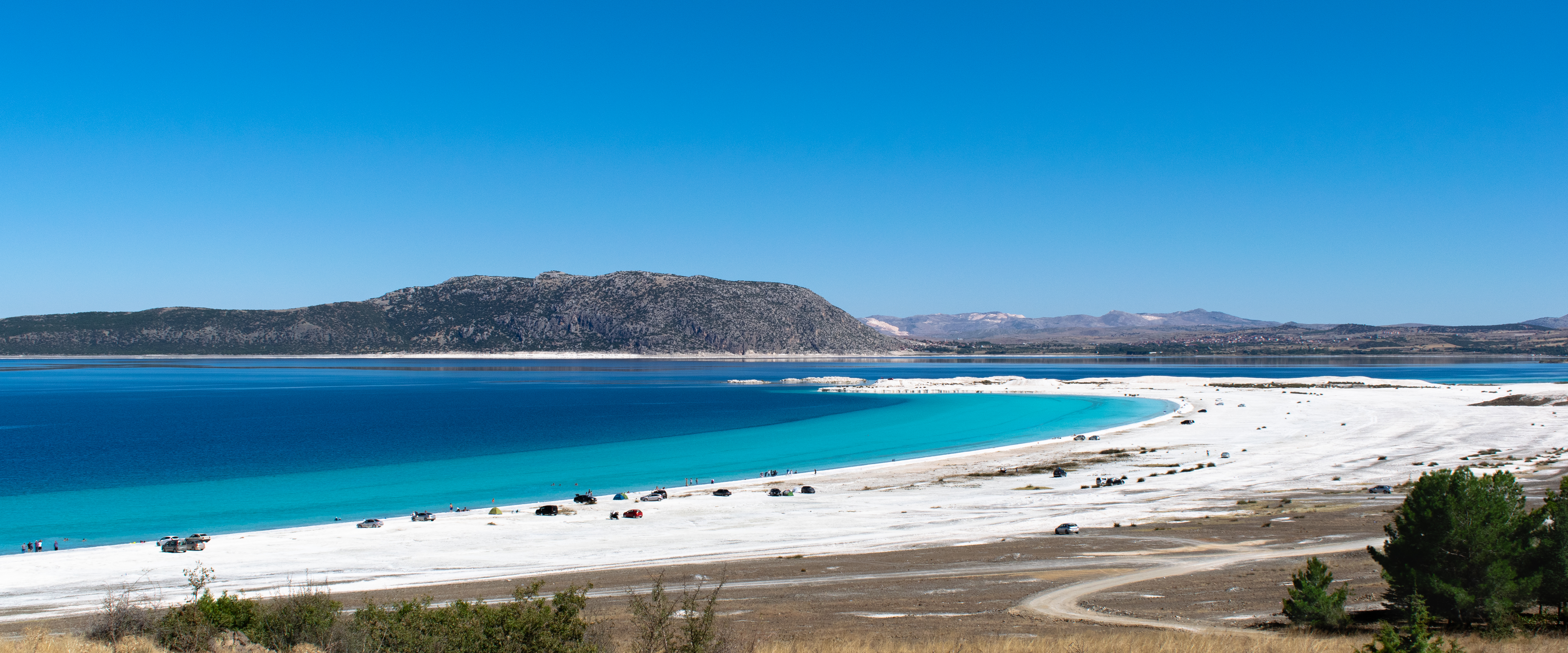
- Lake Salda

- Location of the province within Turkey
- Country: Turkey
- Seat: Burdur

Government
  - Governor: Tülay Baydar Bilgihan
- Area: 7,175 km^{2} (2,770 sq mi)
- Population (2024): 275,826
  - Density: 38.44/km^{2} (99.57/sq mi)
- Time zone: UTC+3 (TRT)
- Area code: 0248
- Website: www.burdur.gov.tr

Burdur Province (Turkish: Burdur ili) is a province of Turkey, located in the southwest and bordering Muğla and Antalya to the south, Denizli to the west, Afyon to the north, and Isparta to the east. Its area is 7,175 km^{2}, and its population is 273,799 (2022). The provincial capital is Burdur city.

Burdur is located in the Lakes Region of Turkey and has many lakes of various sizes, the largest of which, Burdur Lake, is named after the province. Salda Lake is the second largest lake in the province and is considered to be one of the cleanest lakes in the world.

== Districts ==
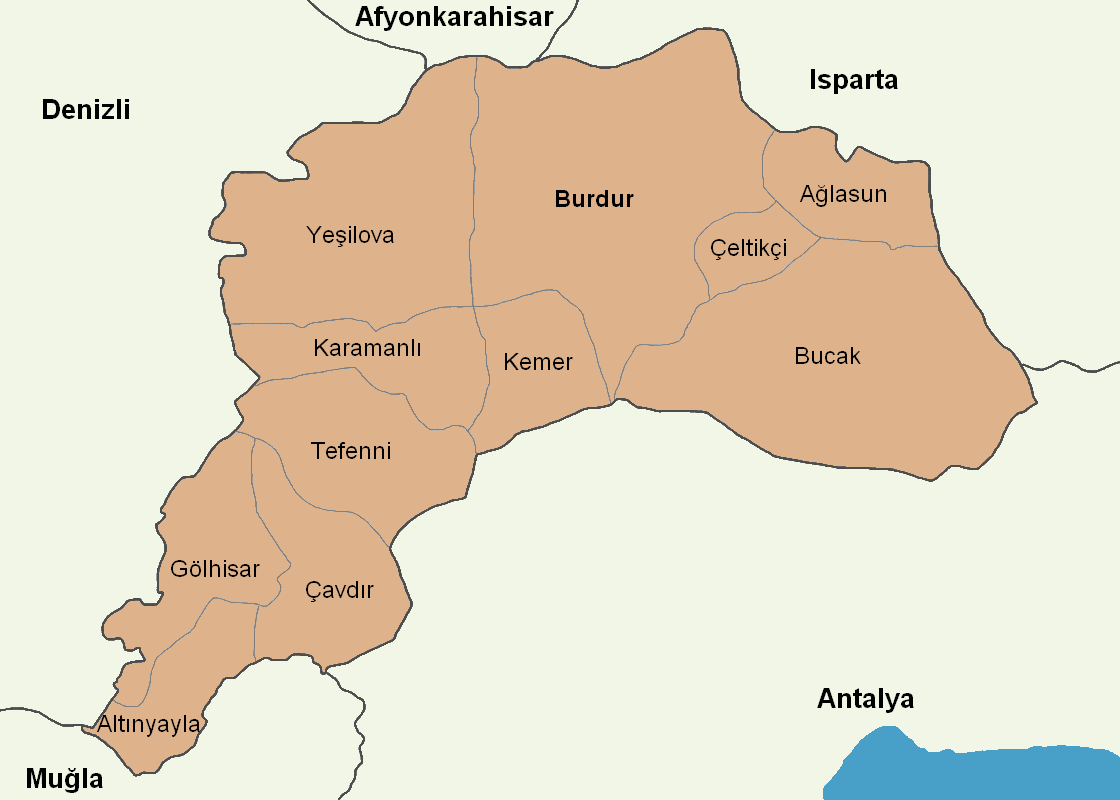

Burdur province is divided into 11 districts (capital district in bold):

- Ağlasun
- Altınyayla
- Bucak
- **Burdur**
- Çavdır
- Çeltikçi
- Gölhisar
- Karamanlı
- Kemer
- Tefenni
- Yeşilova

== Gallery ==
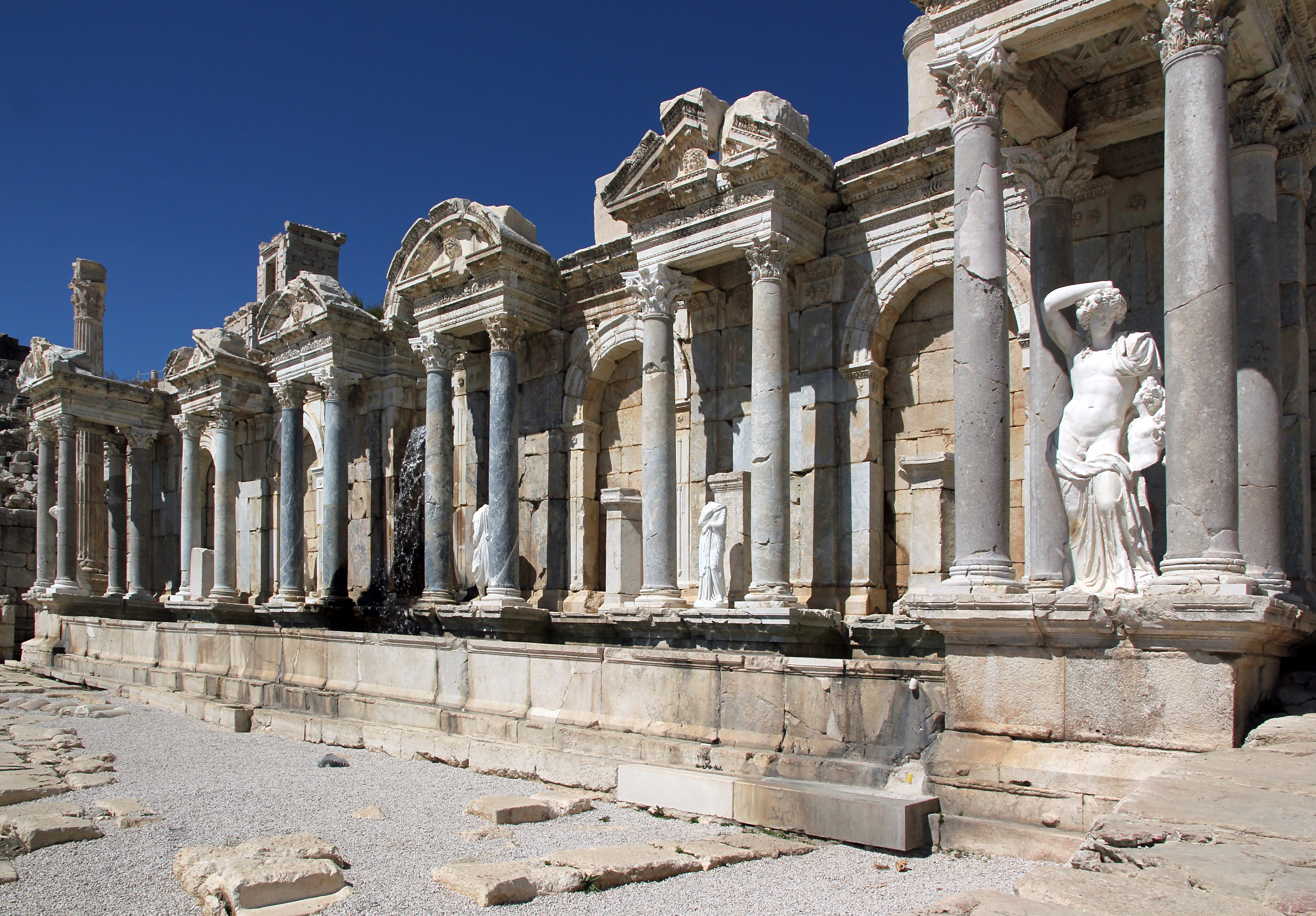
Antonine Fountain in the Ancient city of Sagalassos

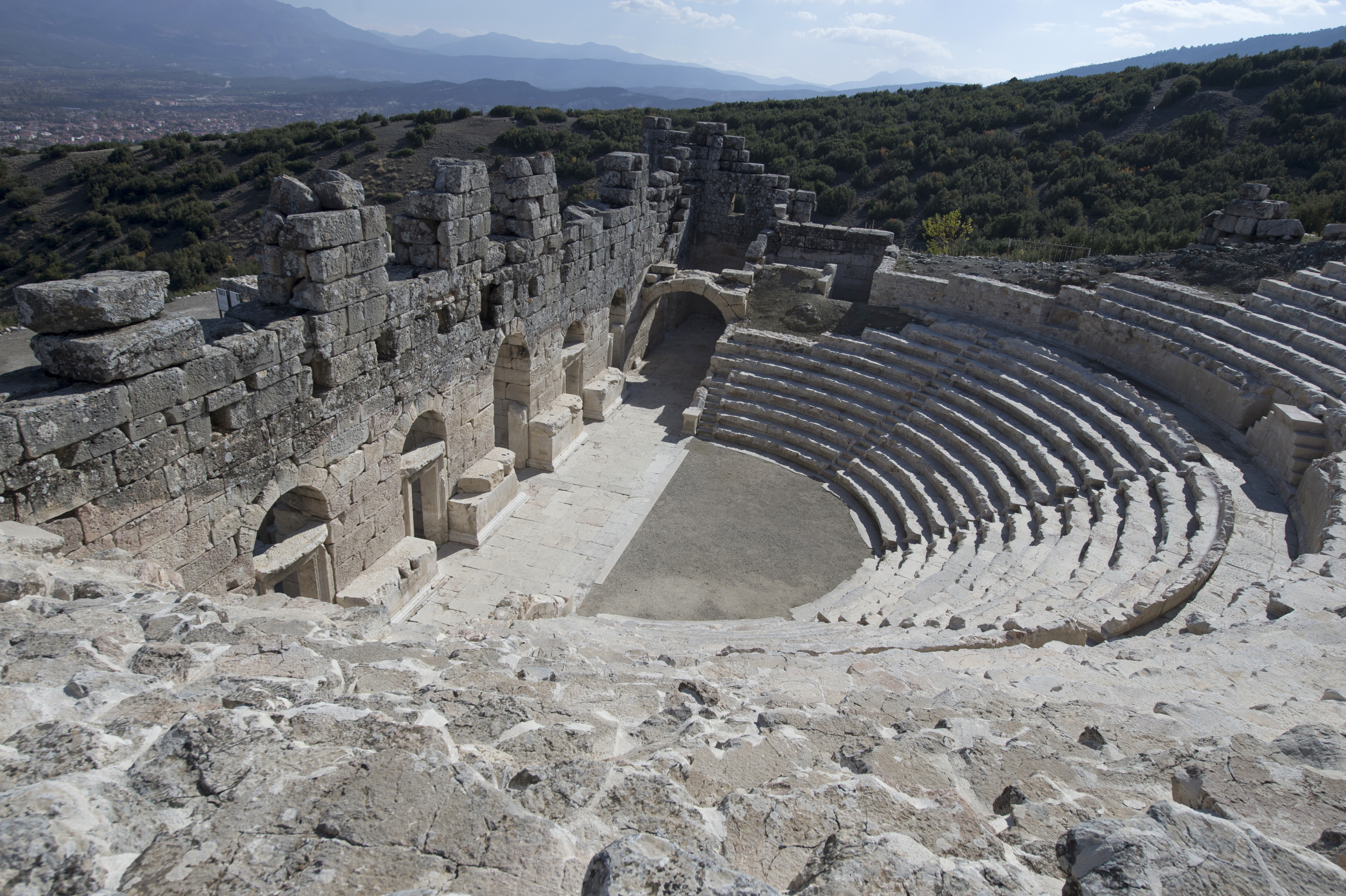
Roman amphitheatre in the Ancient city of Kibyra

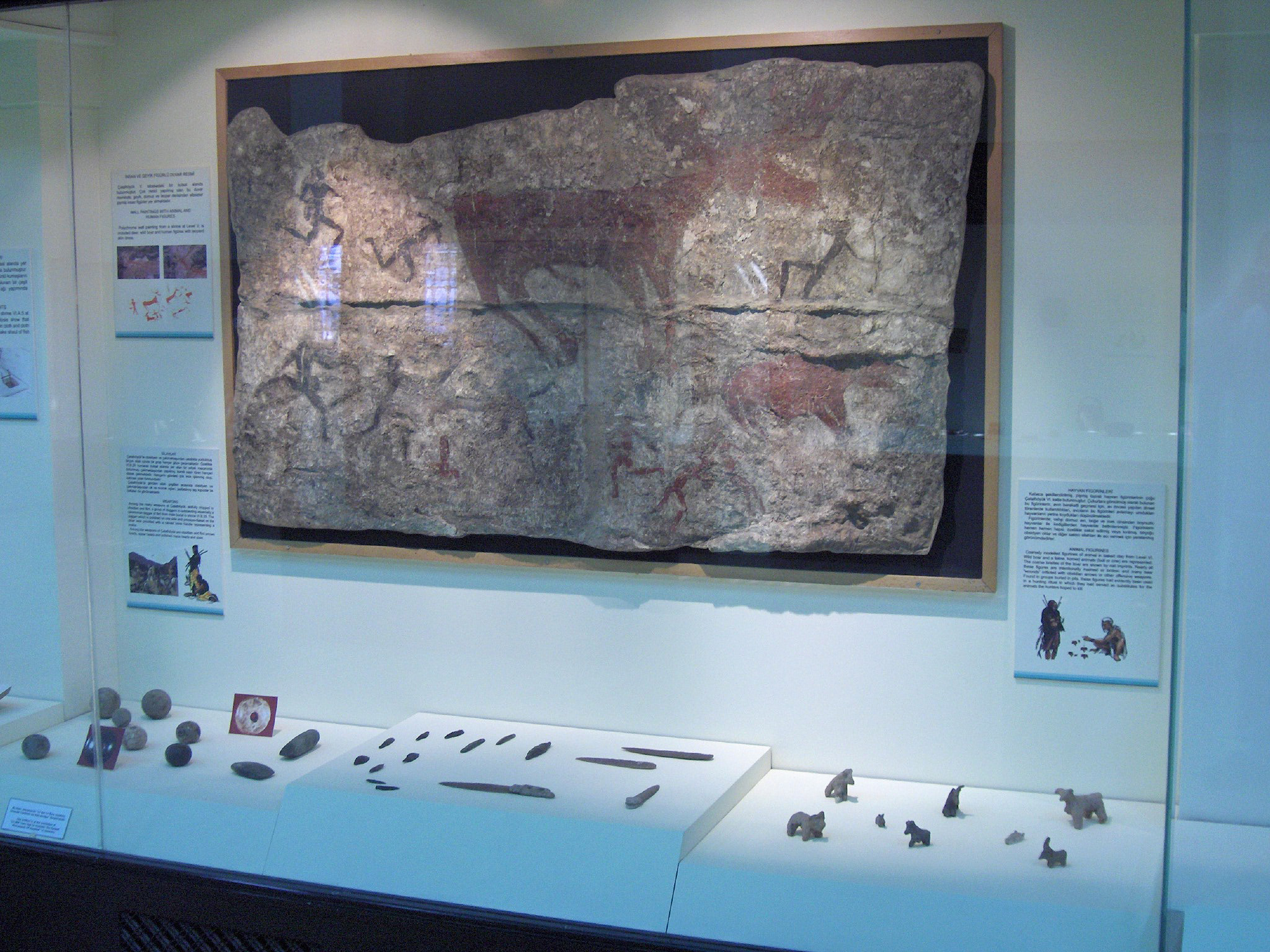
Artifacts retrieved from Hacılar Höyük neolithic site

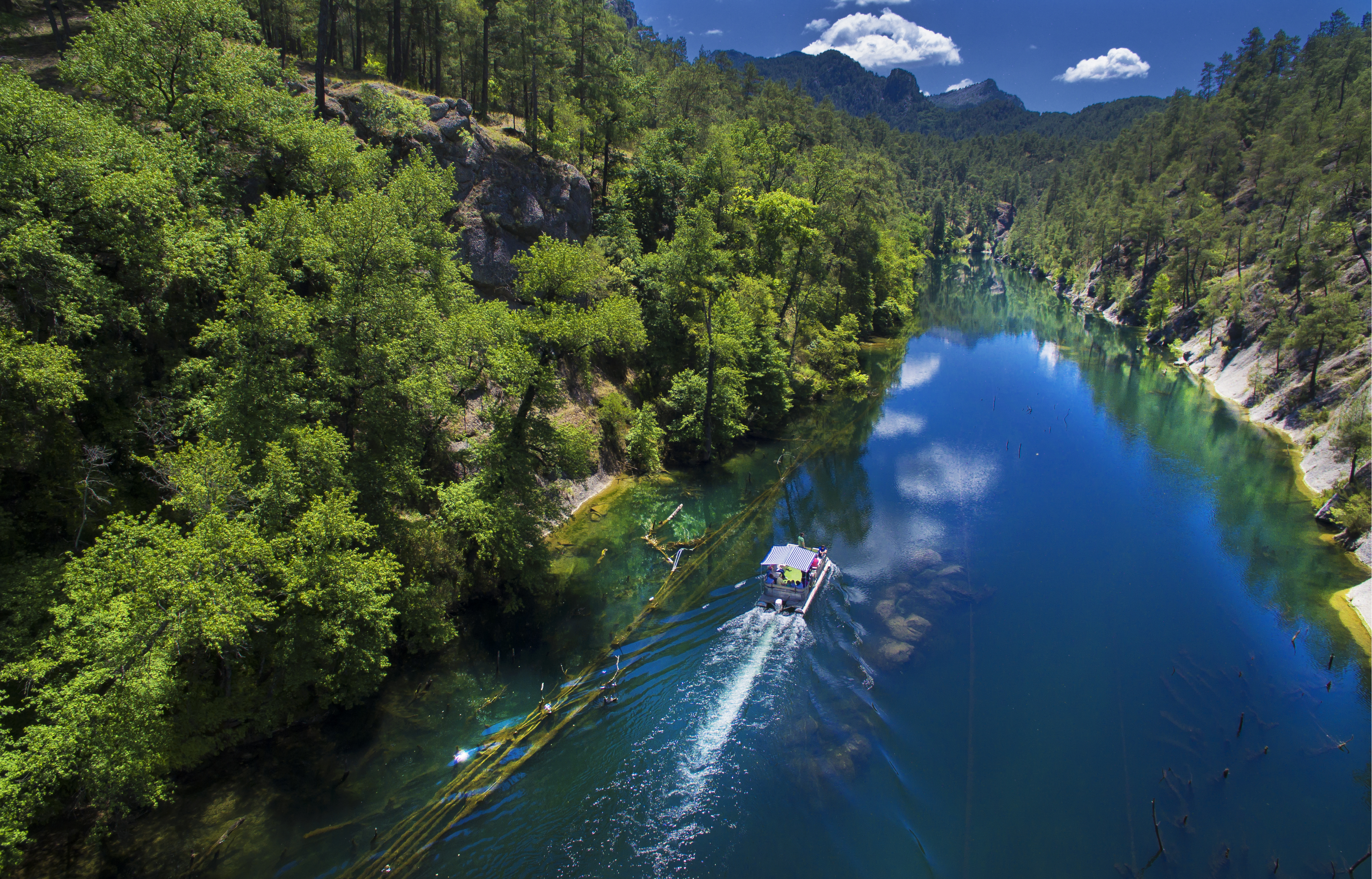
Karacaören Dam, Sweetgum Forest, Kargı Village.

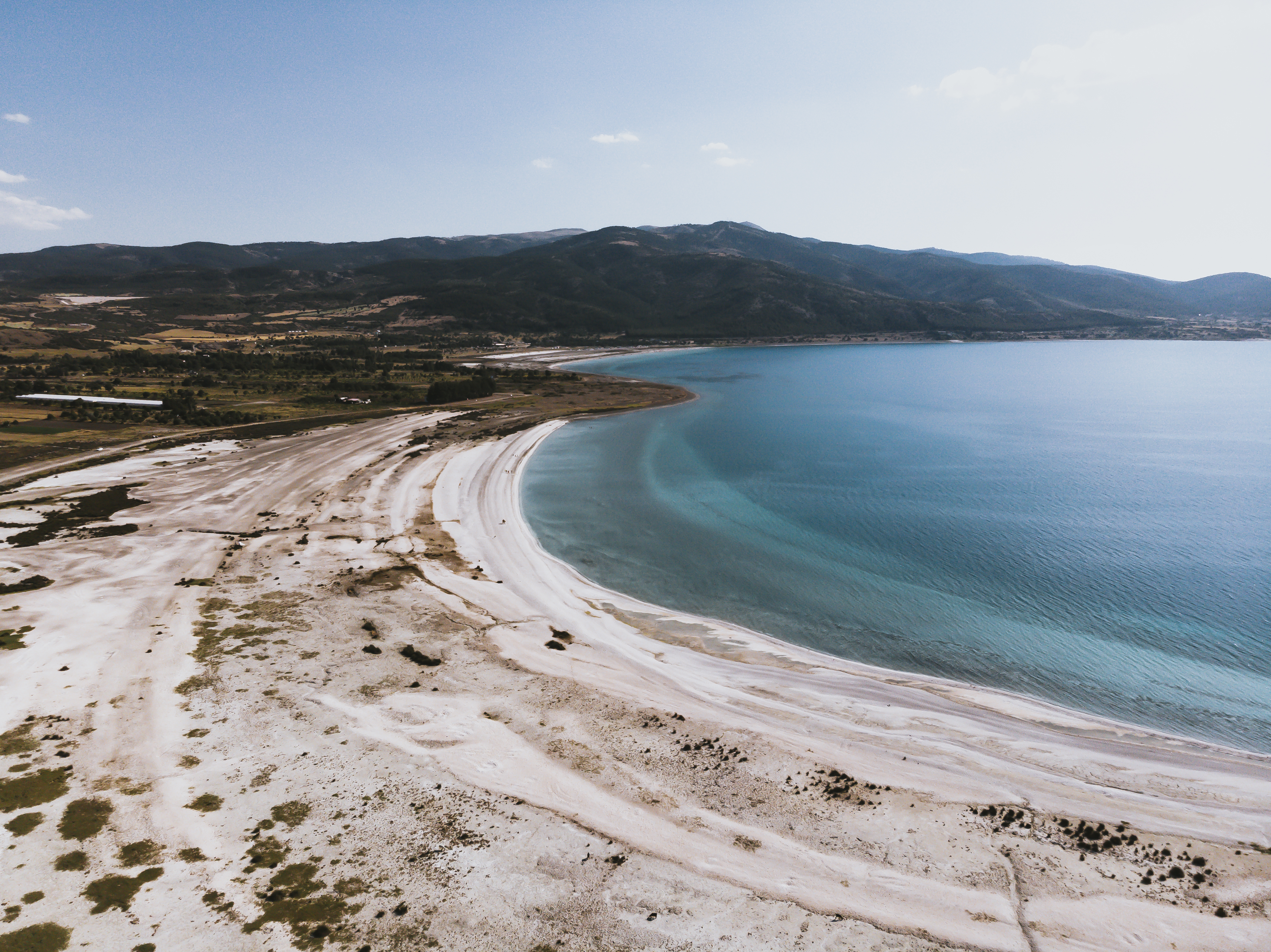
Lake Salda, Burdur.

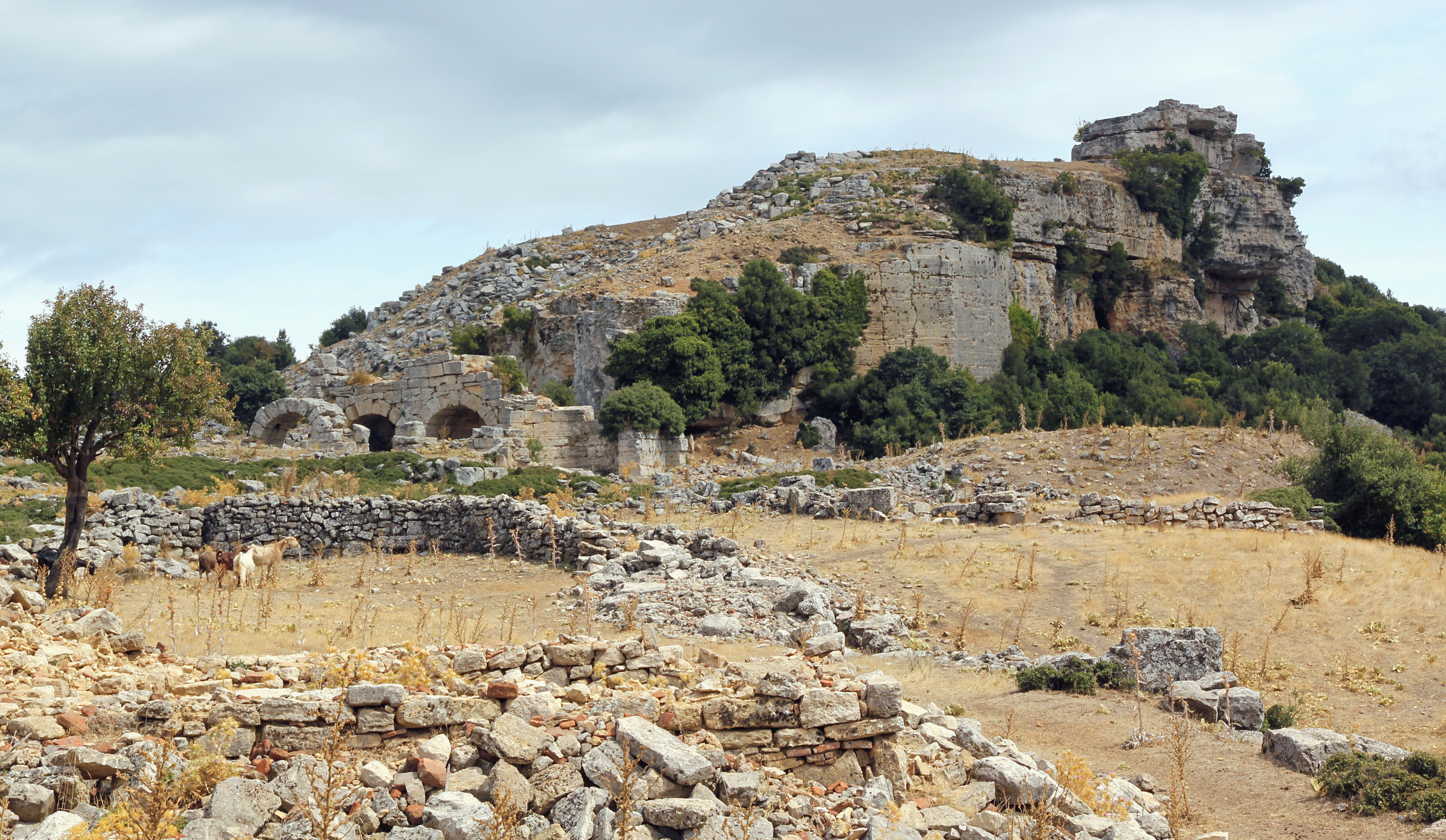
The ancient city of Kremna, or Cremna.

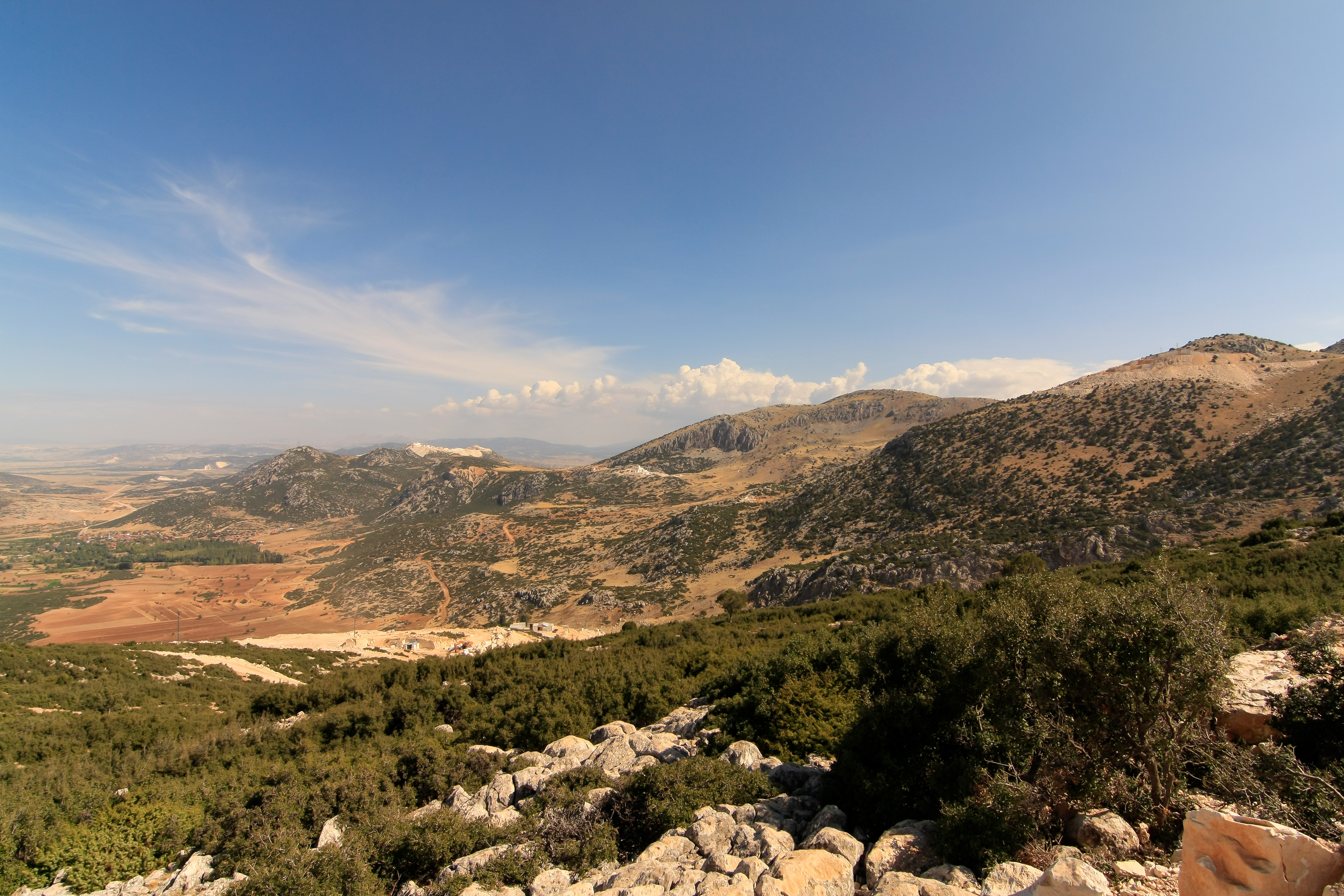
Mountains in Burdur Province

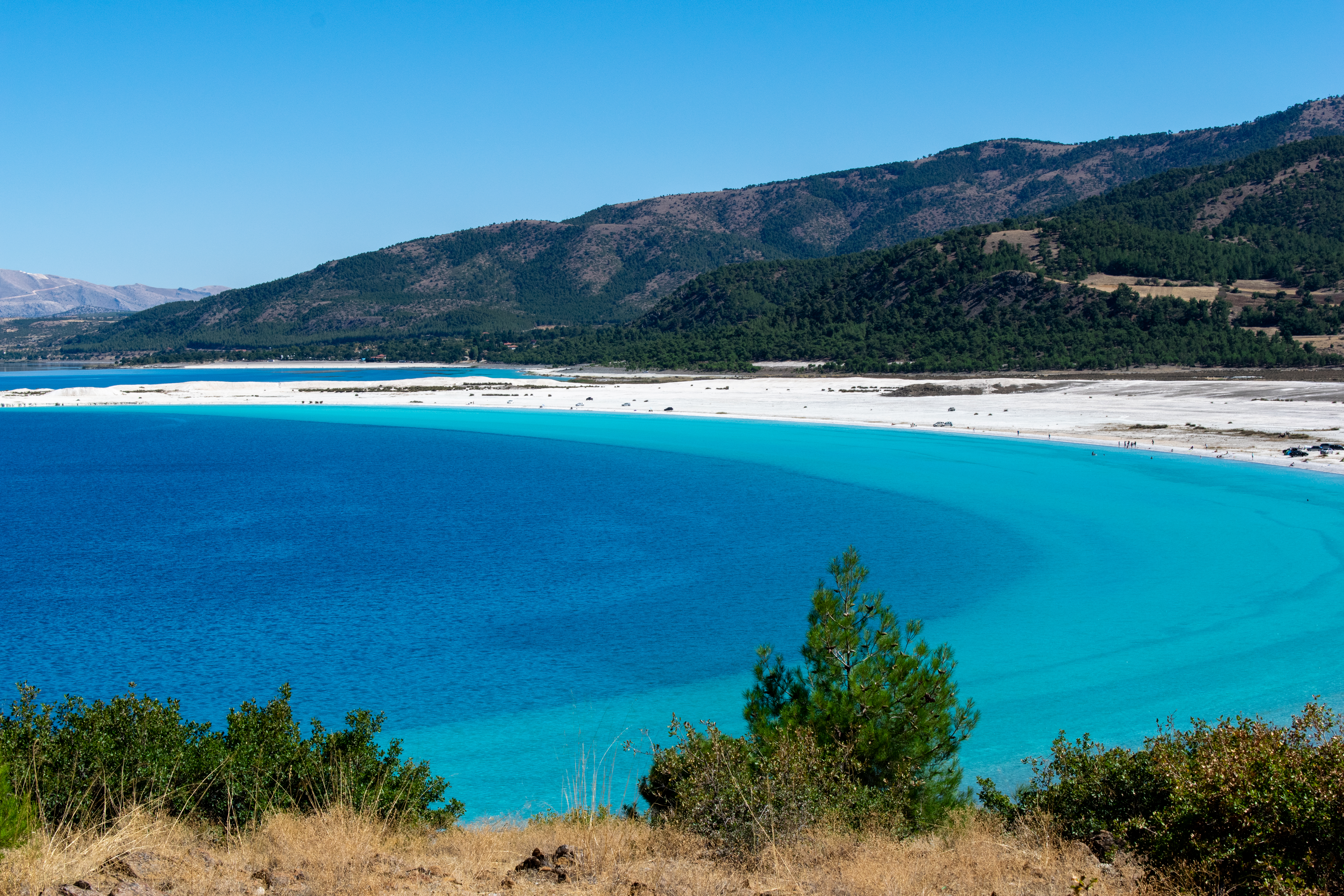
Lake Salda

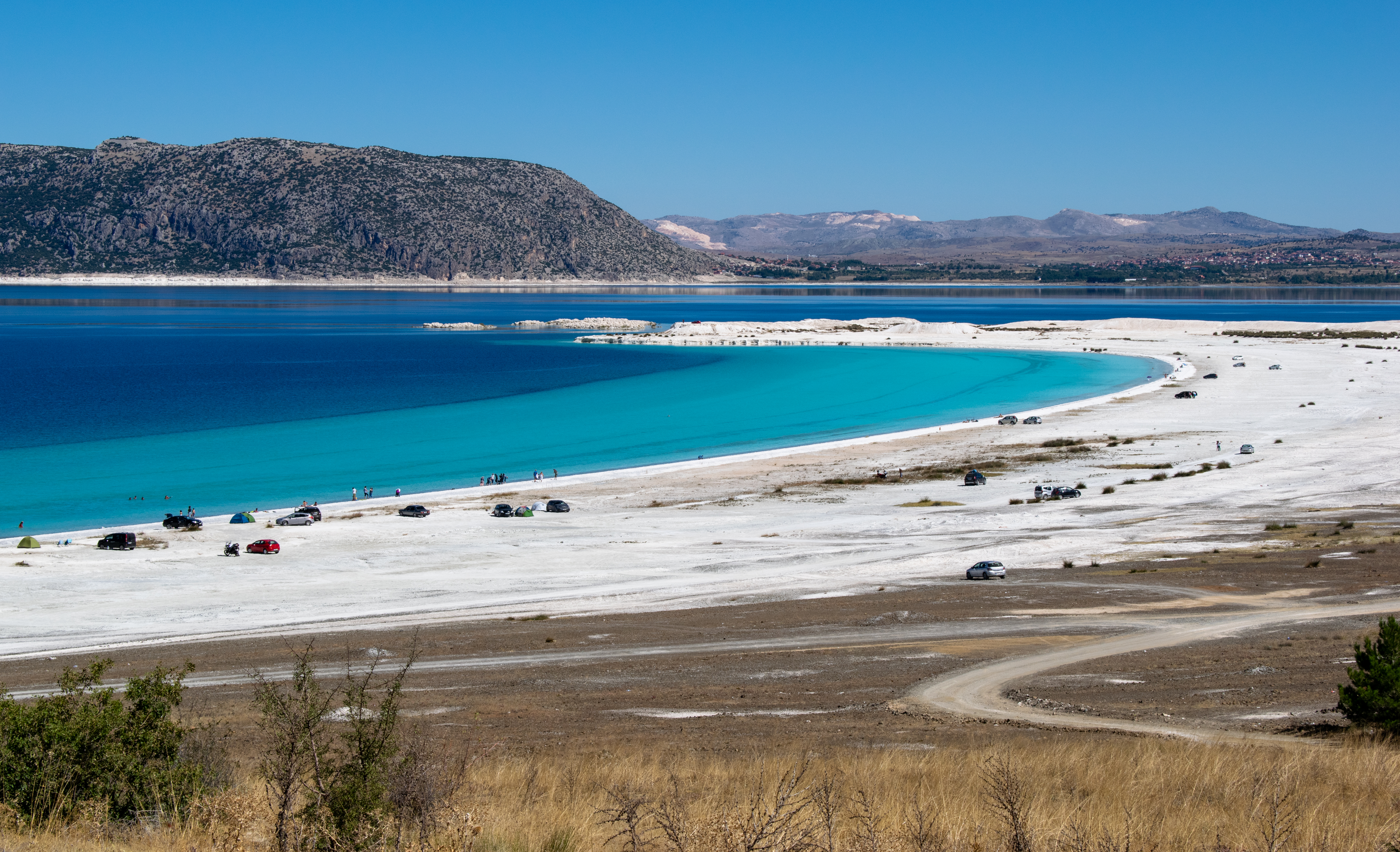
Lake Salda

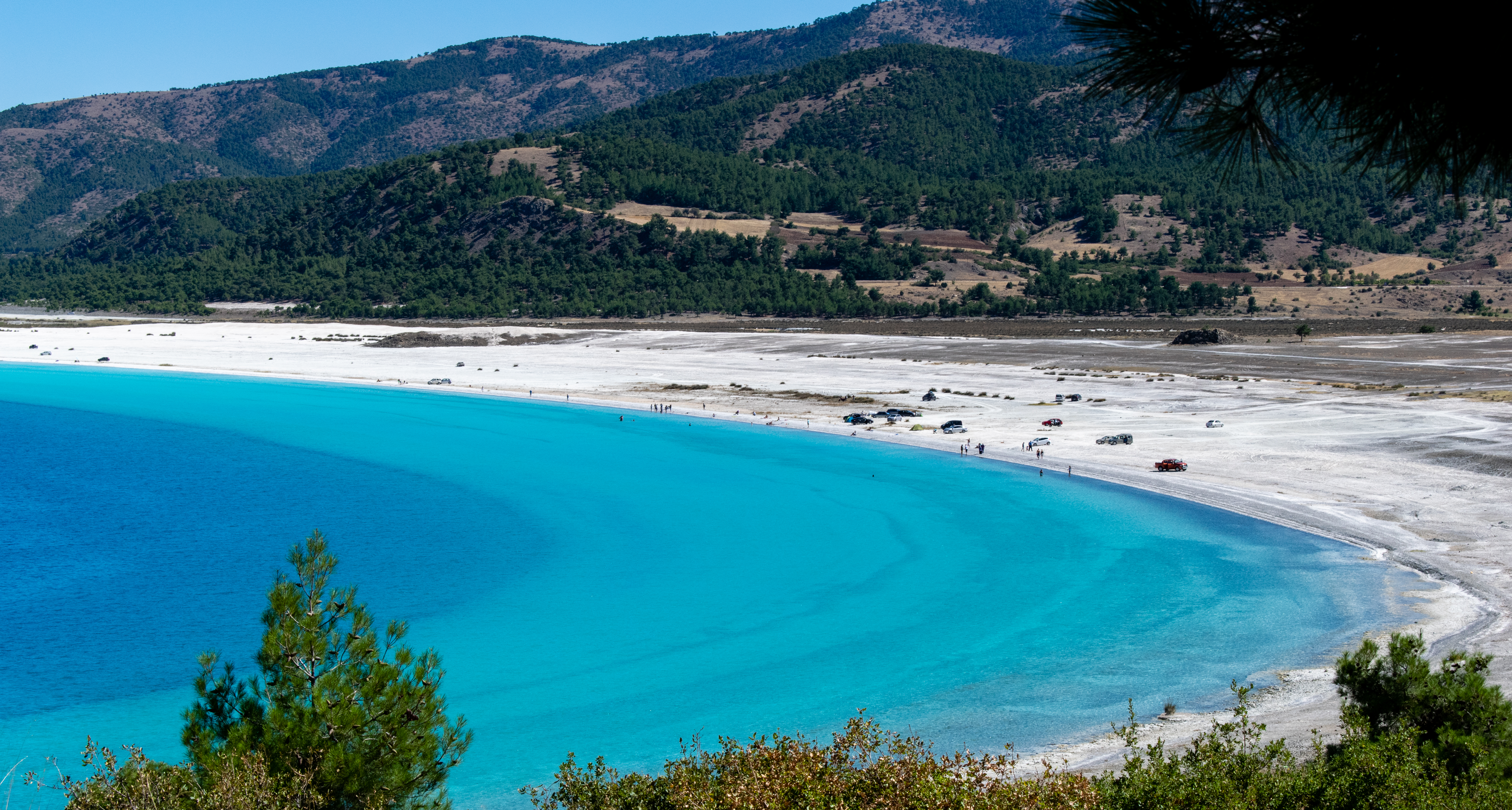
Lake Salda

== See also ==
- List of populated places in Burdur Province
