= Kahraman =

Kahraman is the Turkish word for hero, borrowed from Persian qahramân (قهرمان). It is also a transliteration for Arabic كهرمان meaning amber, borrowed from Persian kahrobâ (کهربا). The first etymology is the source for the modern Turkish surname. Notable people with the surname include:

== People ==
=== Given name ===
- Kahraman Demirtaş (born 1994), Turkish professional footballer
- Kahraman Sadıkoğlu, Turkish businessman

=== Surname ===
- Emre Kahraman (born 1987), Turkish football player
- Hayv Kahraman (born 1981), Iraqi artist and painter
- İlyas Kahraman (born 1976), Turkish professional soccer player
- Isa Kahraman (born 1974), Turkish-born Dutch politician
- İsmail Kahraman (born 1940), Turkish politician from the Justice and Development Party
- Volkan Kahraman (born 1979), Austrian football player of Turkish descent

== Places ==
- Kahraman, Çine, a village in the District of Çine, Aydın Province, Turkey
- Kahramanmaraş, a city in the Mediterranean Region, Turkey and the administrative center of Kahramanmaraş Province

== Others ==
- Kahraman, studio album by Turkish/Belgian singer Hadise

== See also ==
- Karaman (disambiguation)
- Ghahreman
- Ghahremani
