= Qaralı =

Qaralı or Garaly or Qarali may refer to:

- Qaralı, Sabirabad, Azerbaijan
- Birinci Qaralı, Neftchala, Azerbaijan
- İkinci Qaralı, Neftchala, Azerbaijan
- Qarali, West Azerbaijan, Iran
