= Khalil Rza Uluturk =

Azerbaijani poet

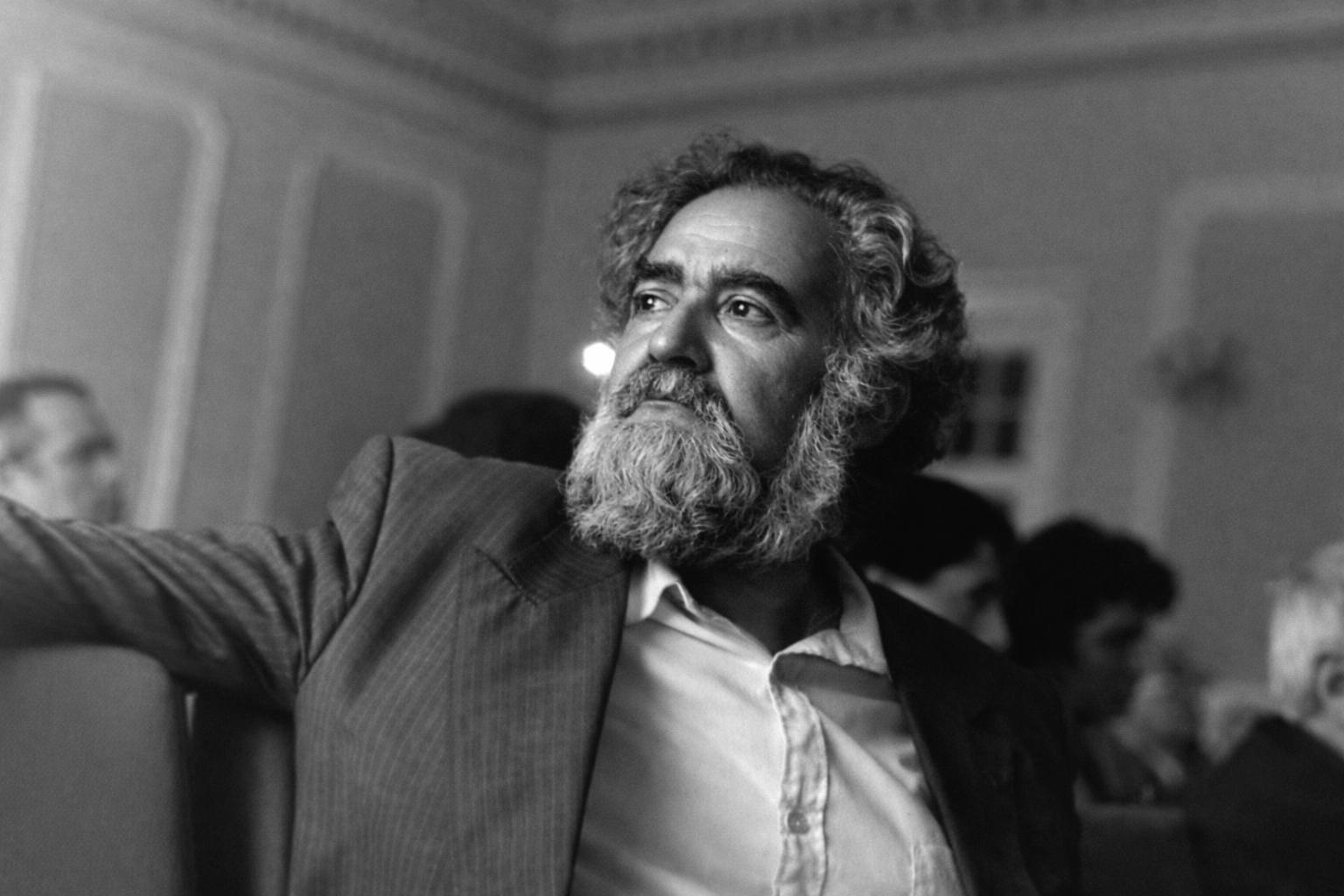
- Born: October 21, 1932; Pirappa, Salyan District, Azerbaijan SSR, TSFSR, USSR
- Died: July 22, 1994 (aged 61); Baku, Azerbaijan
- Education: Baku State University
- Occupation: poet
- Years active: 1948–1994
- Children: Tabriz Khalilbeyli
- Awards

Khalil Rza Uluturk (Azerbaijani: Xəlil Rza Ulutürk), (21 October 1932, Salyan – 22 June 1994, Baku) was an Azerbaijani poet, critic, literary scholar, translator, member of the Azerbaijan Writers' Union since 1954, Doctor of Philological Sciences (1969), Honored Art Worker of Azerbaijan (1986), laureate of the M.F. Akhundov Literary Award (1991), and People's Poet of the Republic of Azerbaijan (1992). Posthumously, he was awarded the "Istiglal" (Independence) Order.

In 1954, he graduated from the Faculty of Philology at Azerbaijan State University (now Baku State University). He began his literary activity during his student years, with his first poems published in the press. He worked for a long time at the Azerbaijan Writers' Union and in various press organizations. Additionally, he conducted research in literary studies, contributing to the study of Azerbaijan's literary heritage.

In the late 1980s, he actively participated in Azerbaijan's national independence movement. After the events of January 20, 1990, he was arrested and held for some time in Moscow's Lefortovo prison. He was released in 1991 and continued his activities, becoming one of the prominent poets of independent Azerbaijan. In 1992, he was awarded the honorary title of "People's Poet of Azerbaijan."

Khalil Rza Uluturk died in Baku in 1994 and was buried in the Alley of Honor. His work holds a significant place in Azerbaijani literature, emphasizing the protection of national values and the expression of political and social ideas in poetry.

== Life ==
Khalil Rza Uluturk was born on October 21, 1932, in Pirəbbə village, Salyan district, Azerbaijan. Some sources note his birth year as 1933, as indicated in his passport and military ID. However, Khalil Rza himself stated that his birth year was 1932, claiming to be the same age as the magazine Tashvigatchi (Azerbaijani: Təşviqatçı ).

Khalil Rza's father was Rza Nagıyev, and his mother was Khanim Nagıyeva. His grandfather, Khalil, after whom Khalil Rza was named, had "a small plot of land, a pair of oxen, and a plow." In 1933, the Soviet government confiscated his property, and in 1937, he was arrested and exiled to Siberia for his nationalist views. After losing their property, the family was forced to move to Salyan in 1939.

From then on, all the family’s responsibilities fell on Khalil Rza’s father, Rza, who was in his 30s. Rza worked as an accountant and inspector and was drafted into the army at the onset of World War II. He actively participated in battles near Moscow in 1941-1942. Upon his return to Salyan, his body bore 17 injuries caused by bullets and shrapnel. Rza bəy died on October 17, 1957, due to complications from these wounds. These traumatic events that Khalil Rza witnessed in his childhood left a lasting impression on him and were reflected in his literary works, academic studies, and public speeches.

In his memoirs, Khalil Rza fondly recalls his father, crediting him for instilling in him national consciousness and sparking his interest in national literature and intellectual pursuits. Khalil Rza noted that he first heard the poetry of Fuzuli, Raci, Sabir, Ali bey Huseynzade, Ziya Gökalp, and Tevfik Fikret recited by his father, Rza. He writes in his memoirs:

"While reading these poems with a passionate and moving voice, sometimes wiping away tears, my father, who died at 47, remains in my eyes a symbol of a grand and noble past."

Khalil Rza Uluturk emphasized that preserving the Azerbaijani language was key to ensuring the unity of an independent Azerbaijan and the transmission of its cultural heritage across generations. He paid special attention to the theme of the mother tongue in his poetry and academic works. In his memoirs, he highlights that he learned the subtleties and harmony of the Azerbaijani language from his mother. He also noted that his mother was a housewife who raised five sons and three daughters. His siblings—Rustem, Tofig, Memmed, Boyukkhanim, Ulduz, Arife, and Ferhad—were also inclined toward poetry.

=== Youth ===
Khalil Rza Uluturk began his education in 1939 at Salyan District School No. 2, graduating in 1949. His tendency to express his thoughts through poetry developed during his school years, which served as the preparatory stage for his literary creativity. During this period, Khalil Rza became acquainted with modern and classical writers, as well as Azerbaijani oral literature, and began expressing himself through poetry.

In 1949, he enrolled in the Philology Faculty of Azerbaijan State University. During his university years, he joined a literary circle led by Jafar Khandan and Bakhtiyar Vahabzadeh. He also participated in "Youth Day" events organized by Mirza İbrahimov, chairman of the Azerbaijan Writers' Union. These literary environments played a significant role in shaping him as a poet and gaining literary knowledge.

Between 1949 and 1954, Khalil Rza Uluturk’s poems were frequently published, helping him gain recognition in literary circles. In 1954, he graduated from university and became a member of the Azerbaijan Writers' Union the same year. After completing his education, he began working at the Azerbaijan Woman magazine, where he remained for two years.

In the 1957-1958 academic year, Khalil Rza was sent to Moscow on the recommendation of the Azerbaijan Writers' Union to attend advanced literary courses at the M. Gorky Literature Institute. Other Azerbaijani literary figures, such as N.Khazri, A.Kurchaylı, Gabil, M.Araz, S.Tahir, E.Eylisli, Fikret Goca, A.Mustafazadeh, and S.Memmedzadeh, also studied at this institution. Renowned writers like Chinghiz Aitmatov, Rasul Gamzatov, Yevgeny Yevtushenko and David Kugultinov also studied there. The students had the opportunity to meet celebrated writers such as Pablo Neruda, Romain Rolland, and Nazım Hikmet. Khalil Rza studied under the guidance of Pavel Antokolsky.

=== Teaching career ===
Between 1959 and 1962, he worked at the editorial office of the magazine Goyarchin (Azerbaijani: Göyərçin ). After completing his studies in Moscow in 1959, he returned to Baku and briefly served as an assistant at the Azerbaijan State Pedagogical Institute. In 1963, he defended his dissertation on the topic The Genre of Poem in Post-War Azerbaijani Soviet Literature, earning the title of "Candidate of Philological Sciences."

Starting in 1963, Uluturk began teaching at the Azerbaijan State Pedagogical University, named after N. Tusi. Ismayil Shykhly’s remarks about his classes are noteworthy:

He taught Azerbaijani Soviet literature. However, there was neither a program nor a plan. The lessons lacked a defined structure. He would often lose track of how much time he was dedicating to a particular poet or writer. Before you knew it, he had gone completely off topic. Passionate Khalil would speak about his favorite poets with great enthusiasm, reciting their poems. His classes were always packed with students.

Khalil Rza Uluturk’s wife, Firangiz, recalled that his lectures were so captivating that students from other classes would skip their own lessons to attend his. In 1964, Uluturk expressed his excitement about teaching and his connection with his students in a poem titled My Students.

Unlike many of his colleagues, Uluturk actively fought to preserve the purity of the Azerbaijani language in his lectures, instilling a love for the language and the homeland in his students. He dedicated years to strengthening the Azerbaijani language by eliminating words and expressions borrowed from Arabic, Persian, and Russian. Notably, he was the first to introduce the word çimərlik (beach) into Azerbaijani. He replaced words such as doğma (native) with biçim, televizor (television) with telegüzgü, fortoçka (small window) with nəfəslik, and istiqamət (direction) with yön. His wife described his linguistic sensitivity:

When Khalil worked at API (Azerbaijan Pedagogical Institute), he was deeply engaged in the struggle to purify the language. He would impose a fine of five kopecks on anyone who used foreign words and sometimes reward his fellow countrymen with a ruble for their commendable speech. This practice upset some Russified intellectuals. The Writers' Union criticized him. He often faced backlash for his campaigns.

However, his stance on the Azerbaijani language displeased the administration, and as a result, Uluturk was dismissed from his position. Following this incident, he remained unemployed for some time.

Uluturk’s sensitivity regarding his native language also alarmed Soviet authorities. Akhundov, the First Secretary of the Central Committee of the Azerbaijan Communist Party, criticized Khalil Rza’s poem Mother Tongue and other works at an August 1962 Central Committee meeting, accusing him of promoting harmful national pride.

When a Turkish delegation visited Azerbaijan for the 250th anniversary of the great Azerbaijani poet Vagif, Uluturk was denied permission to meet them. Despite being under surveillance by the State Security Committee during the celebrations, Uluturk defied the restrictions and met the Turkish guests at their hotel, presenting them with his manuscripts. For publishing his poem Mother Tongue (Azerbaijani: Ana dili) in Turkey, Uluturk faced further pressure from the Azerbaijan Writers' Union. The union's chairman, Mehdi Huseyn, criticized Khalil Rza's "damaging national pride" in an article published in Literature and Art on September 8, 1962. In 1967, Uluturk represented Azerbaijani writers during a visit to Turkey. This pivotal trip laid the foundation for his ideas on Turkism.

Following these events, Khalil Rza endured prolonged persecution. His phones were tapped, and he was branded a "guilty individual" in official circles. Reflecting on the period of unemployment, he recounted his struggles in an interview shortly after the January 20, 1990 tragedy:

I did not work in any other government position. I faced difficulties in supporting my family and feeding my children. My family never knew that I was unemployed for two years. I couldn’t bring myself to tell them. To make ends meet, I traveled from village to village, giving lectures and reciting poetry. In short, I took on any job outside my primary profession. Often, even these efforts were obstructed. Yet, without changing my beliefs or bowing to oppression, I managed to persevere until 1969. Finally, in 1969, they had no choice but to offer me a job. Now, I continue in the same role. But my true mission is to speak my people’s language and be the voice of their feelings.

=== Academic Years ===
Despite the obstacles posed by the Soviet regime, in 1969, Uluturk was invited to the Nizami Institute of Literature at the Azerbaijan Academy of Sciences, where he continued his literary work as a senior researcher. At the Institute, Uluturk collaborated with figures like Mirzaaga Quluzade and Aziz Mirahmadov, worked on translations, and prepared his doctoral dissertation.

In 1970, he traveled to Tashkent to gather materials on Maqsud Shayxzoda for his doctoral dissertation. In 1974, his wife Firangiz was sent to the Tashkent Advanced Training Institute. Together with their son Rza, they joined Khalil Rza in Tashkent.

In 1983, under Aziz Mirahmadov’s leadership, Khalil Rza’s 50th anniversary was celebrated at the Academy. In 1984, it was decided at the M.F. Akhundov Library to present Khalil Rza with the State Award for his books Long Nights (Azerbaijani: Uzun ömürlü gecələr) and Garland of Brotherhood (Azerbaijani: Qardaşlıq çələngi). However, this decision was blocked by higher authorities. Shortly thereafter, the Gorky Central Mobile Library and the Poetry Section of the Azerbaijan Writers’ Union organized another event to present Khalil Rza with the State Award for his works published by Gənclik and Maarif. Those who participated or supported these events were immediately dismissed from their jobs. Khalil Rza made every effort to have these individuals reinstated, albeit in lower positions.

In 1985, Khalil Rza defended his doctoral dissertation titled Maqsud Shayxzoda’s Artistic Creativity and Current Problems of Azerbaijani-Uzbek Literary Relations, earning the title of Doctor of Philology. A year later, his salary was increased, he was awarded the title of Honored Art Worker, and was appointed as a professor at the Azerbaijan National Academy of Sciences.

=== Participation in the National Liberation Movement ===
From the 1950s onward, Khalil Rza Uluturk became known for his poetry and literary writings. After the 1980s, his name began to be associated with political activities as he actively participated in Azerbaijan’s independence struggle, becoming a prominent intellectual figure in the liberation movement.

He spent nearly all his time at demonstrations, often accompanied by his son Tabriz, who feared for his father’s life due to his speeches and poetry.

On January 20, 1990, Soviet forces entered Baku, resulting in the January 20 tragedy. This was executed under Gorbachev’s orders. Khalil Rza visited the crime scene the next day. On January 26, 1990, he went to Martyrs’ Lane and publicly criticized Soviet leaders, including Mikhail Sergeyevich Gorbachev, through his poem Bloody Executioner. After delivering the poem, he was warned that he would be arrested and advised to flee, but he ignored the warning.

Returning home in actor Mikayil Mirza’s car, they were intercepted by a RAF vehicle in the Youth Square. At 5:15 PM, four armed men forced them into the KGB headquarters. Mikayil Mirza was released at midnight, but Khalil Rza was sent to Moscow’s Lefortovo Prison the same night. His wife, Firangiz, filed numerous petitions to the Azerbaijani State Security Committee but received no information. Khalil Rza’s journals were taken to Lülüfər Khanum’s house in Khirdalan for safekeeping. In mid-February, after an interview with Khalil Rza aired on television, his family learned of his whereabouts.

From his accounts, it became clear that he was kept in a filthy, cramped cell with numerous other detainees. Khalil Rza wrote:

"As I was the eldest, I was allowed to sit. Etibar sat on my knees. There was no way to move. Later, we were sent to a foul-smelling cell. I cleaned it thoroughly, but then we were again put into a black car and taken to a train. All my efforts were in vain. Eventually, we were moved to other vehicles. The wind in Baku was invigorating. Finally, we were brought to the KGB building and placed in a room. The walls were bloodstained, and the room was infested with mosquitoes. It was impossible to stay there."

While he was imprisoned, his salary was cut off. A campaign was launched for his release, with a tent set up outside his home, and protests began with people carrying signs that read Freedom for the People’s Poet. Radio Free Europe broadcast programs about Khalil Rza’s imprisonment.

He was charged under Article 67 of the Azerbaijani SSR Criminal Code for inciting national hatred and faced a sentence ranging from three months to ten years. Khalil Rza was the only Azerbaijani poet sent to Lefortovo Prison. During his 8 months and 13 days there, he wrote over 200 poems, letters, and articles, collectively titled The Lefortovo Diary.

After being held in prisons in Baku, Moscow, Voronezh, and Rostov for about nine months, a trial was held. The Baku City Court, responding to public pressure and demands from the Khalil Rza Defense Committee, acquitted him fully.

Upon his return from Lefortovo, Khalil Rza, together with Rafiq Zeka and Ahmed Elbrus, established the Qorqud publishing house, which published his collection Our Walking Encyclopedia. In 1990, he received the M.F. Akhundov Award for his poem It Continues – 37.

=== Parliamentary Elections ===
On January 10, 1990, during the parliamentary elections, Khalil Rza was nominated as a candidate for the deputy role from the S. Lazo No. 18 electoral district in the Baku-Kirov region. His political program, submitted after the biography in his application, was as follows:

1. The restoration of our national army, alphabet, state borders that existed until April 28, 1920, economic and political independence, and the cessation of the despicable Dashnaktsutyun aggression.
2. Azerbaijan's history, literature, arts, culture, and science must be entirely rewritten, eliminating everything contrary to Turkism, the homeland, the nation, and the truth.
3. All black statues, busts, and idols must be destroyed, and hearts and minds should be cleansed from their vile influence.
4. The single-party system and the 70 years of colonialism, which made Azerbaijan a slave to the Soviet Communist Party, must end, removing the bloody ax hanging over Azerbaijan’s neck.
5. From January 20, 1990, onwards, those responsible for the bloody operations, arrests, and tragedies in Baku and later in other parts of the state, as well as on the borders, must be brought to trial and punished.
6. Freedom of thought and conscience must be ensured in academies, higher education institutions, radio, television, press, and other social organizations, and anything against these principles should be rejected.
7. Environmental issues in cities like Sumgait, which ranks first in the world for ecological disasters, as well as Baku and Ganja, must be addressed.
8. The genocide committed against 1.8 million Azerbaijani Turks expelled and killed in their ancestral lands, the ancient Oghuz territories, since 1905 must be brought to the attention of the international community, and the executors of this bloody policy must be denounced.
9. A favorable environment should be created for the national-cultural development of ethnic groups while maintaining Azerbaijan's territorial integrity.
10. The Azerbaijani language must not only remain nominally but effectively be elevated to the status of the state language, ensuring its use in courts, law enforcement agencies, science, culture, economics, and all industries, with words, expressions, and terms derived from the Turkish nation's lexicon.
11. The national and spiritual unity of South and North Azerbaijan must be ensured, with the development of culture and tourism given priority.
12. Those who exhibited national dishonor during difficult times for the nation and their clear representatives and allies must be exposed.

Despite collecting a total of 3,314 votes—79 votes before and 87 after the elections—the government claimed insufficient majority and disqualified him from the position.

In the spring of 1991, Abulfaz Elchibey sent Khalil Rza and his wife, along with other representatives, to Ankara. They later traveled to Istanbul. On May 6, 1991, Khalil Rza delivered a speech at the Turkish Cultural Association. During the same period, the "Western Thrace Journal" honored him with the title of "Turkish Nation Award Laureate on behalf of Western Thrace and World Turks." A year later, in 1992, he was awarded the title of "People's Poet of the Republic of Azerbaijan."

=== Death ===
Due to health issues, in 1992, Khalil Rza underwent diabetes and eye examinations at Cerrahpaşa Hospital in Istanbul upon the directive of Süleyman Demirel. On May 19, he had heart surgery at Haseki Cardiology Hospital. He returned to Baku on February 11, 1993, but a wound on his leg failed to heal, leading to his transfer to Germany on August 23, 1993. There, he was treated at the Zolenger City Clinic, and his treatment continued at the Cardiology Institute in Baku.

During President Heydar Aliyev’s visit to France, Khalil Rza and his wife were part of the delegation. However, his diabetes caused persistent discomfort, leading to wounds on his toes. After returning to Baku, doctors had to amputate one of his toes. This marked his last trip abroad. Upon his return from France, Khalil Rza frequently delivered speeches in front-line regions, schools, and organizations, which further deteriorated his health, rendering treatments ineffective.During these years, Khalil Rza also became the editor-in-chief of the newly launched Gunay newspaper.

Khalil Rza Uluturk died on June 22, 1994. His funeral was accompanied by the Azerbaijan State Philharmonic Orchestra, and his body was carried on shoulders to be laid to rest in the Alley of Honor (Fəxri Xiyaban).

The poet’s statue was created by renowned sculptor Azad Aliyev.

== Family ==
Firangiz was born on December 31, 1932, in Baku. Raised in an intellectual family with a keen interest in social sciences, Firangiz graduated from the History Faculty of Azerbaijan State University. She served as the head of the personnel department at the printing house of the 26th Baku State Press Committee. Starting in 1969, she worked as a senior laboratory assistant at the Azerbaijan Oil and Chemistry Institute (now the Azerbaijan State Oil and Industry University). From 1970 onwards, she taught Philosophy and Political Science and continued her teaching career for many years. Firangiz and her sister Sima attended the same university as Khalil Rza. In a TV interview, Firangiz shared her memories of meeting Khalil Rza:

"In 1954, I was a first-year university student, and Khalil was in his fourth year. My sister, who studied with Khalil, was working at the time, so I often brought her meals. Khalil saw me there, and later, he followed me but didn’t speak; he only wrote letters. Seeing Khalil’s courage, I couldn’t help but develop a liking for him."

Firangiz’s mother belonged to the Ashurbayov family and wished for her daughter to marry within the family. This created challenges for Firangiz and Khalil Rza during their university years, limiting their meetings and forcing them to communicate mostly through letters. Despite these difficulties, with Firangiz’s father’s consent, the couple married on December 7, 1956.

Beyond being Khalil Rza’s wife, Firangiz played a significant role in preserving and promoting his legacy. After the poet’s death, she worked tirelessly to collect, edit, and publish his unpublished letters, poems, and translations, contributing significantly to Azerbaijani literature. She published 56 of Khalil Rza’s books posthumously. For her services to Azerbaijani literature, she was awarded a presidential scholarship by the decree of President Ilham Aliyev.

Firangiz and Khalil Rza had two children, Tabriz Khalilbeyli and Rza Khalilbeyli.

=== Tabriz Khalilbeyli ===
On February 12, 1964, Khalil Rza welcomed his son, Tabriz, into the world. After graduating from M. Mushfig School No. 18 in Baku in 1974, Tabriz studied at the Azerbaijan State Institute of Arts, specializing in directing mass performances. He refused military service in the Soviet Army and worked at the Azerbaijan Radio and Television Company instead. On August 28, 1986, Tabriz married Sevinc Khanum, with whom he had two daughters, Turkay and Gultaj.

At the end of 1991, Tabriz volunteered to join the front lines. He participated in battles for the villages of Khramord and Nakhchivanik and was awarded the "Boz Gurd" medal by the Ministry of Internal Affairs for his bravery. Tabriz’s last battle was on January 31, 1992, during the Dashalti operation aimed at breaking the siege of Shusha, where he was killed.

On October 8, 1992, by Decree No. 264 of the President of the Republic of Azerbaijan, Tabriz Khalilbeyli was posthumously awarded the title of "National Hero of Azerbaijan." He was laid to rest in the Alley of Martyrs in Baku. A street in Baku and one in Salyan District are named after him, as is a ship used for special purposes. A commemorative plaque has also been installed in front of his former residence. On February 13, 2024, a memorial event was held in honor of Tabriz Khalilbeyli’s 60th birthday.

== Creativity ==
=== Poems ===
Khalil Rza began his artistic creativity in the late 1940s. The years 1939-1949 are considered the period when Khalil Rza Uluturk made his first romantic-creative poetry experiences and formed his artistic world. Uluturk's first poem criticizing communism, "Kitab" (Book), was published in 1948 in the newspaper "Azərbaycan pioneri" (Azerbaijan Pioneer). Although this poem is shown as the poet's first published work in his archival documents, that year, the poet's poem "Abşeron" (Absheron) was also published in the Pioneer newspaper. This poem, published when he was only 16 years old, allowed the poet to become acquainted with a broader literary environment and participate in various circles and magazines with his poems.

In the 1950s, Khalil Rza's poems "Qatar gedər" (The Train Goes), "Budapeştdə heykəl" (Statue in Budapest), "Müqəddəs yol" (Holy Path), "Böyük günlər bayramı" (Holiday of Great Days), "Radionu dinlərkən" (While Listening to the Radio), and "Həyat düşüncələri" (Thoughts on Life) show a decrease in poetic intonation, while social-political poems such as "Şərqin gözləri" (Eyes of the East), "Şairin cavabı" (The Poet's Response), and "Bəzənin, a qızlar" exhibit traditional motifs and epic-lyric narratives. In 1957, the poet's first poetry book "Bahar gəlir" (Spring is Coming) was published. Two years later, the poetry book "Sevən gözlər" (Loving Eyes) was released.

The poems written in 1950 are considered the source of themes of love, heroism, and freedom in the poet's creativity. For example: "Mənim ata yurdum, ata məskənim" (My Fatherland, My Ancestral Home) (1957–58), "Ata işdən gələndə" (When Father Comes Home from Work) (1958), "Zəfər çələngi" (Wreath of Victory) (1958), "Ata əlləri" (Father's Hands) (1959), "Sırıqlı" (The Striped One) (1959), "Miras" (Heritage) (1959), "Ay ana, yanımda olaydın mənim" (Oh Mother, If Only You Were Here with Me) (1959).

During this period, the poet's attitude towards war is also reflected. Works such as "Nə gözəl yerləri qorumuşdur o" (How Beautiful Places He Has Protected) (1958), "Sizin mavzoleyiniz" (Your Mausoleum) (1958), "Hayıf, ata, sən görmədin" (Alas, Father, You Did Not See) (1958), "Mən dava görməmişəm" (I Have Not Seen War) (1967), "Atanın şer dəftərindən" (From Father's Poetry Notebook) (1968), and "Ən qiymətli əklil" (The Most Valuable Crown) (1969) were written as a tribute to the warrior father.

The social-political events and freedom movements occurring in the world during the 1960s contributed to the development of national literatures in terms of people's and universal values, leading to changes in artistic quality in poetry. During this period, social-political ideas were more prominently reflected in the works of poets. The poetic searches of the 1960s clarified the sources of Khalil Rza's creative ideal, highlighting ideas of Turkism, patriotism, freedom, and independence. Khalil Rza's poetic manifesto, the poem "Azadlıq" (Freedom), was first published in the December 24, 1960, issue of the newspaper "Ədəbiyyat və incəsənət" (Literature and Art) under the title "Afrikanın səsi" (Voice of Africa). In the poem "Afrikanın səsi" (later "Şairin səsi" (The Poet's Voice), "Azərbaycanın səsi" (Voice of Azerbaijan), "Xalqımın səsi" (Voice of My People), "Mənim səsim" (My Voice)), the nuances of the idea of freedom, its poetic intonation, expressive means, and the universal concept of "I" are powerfully expressed.

Overall, the idea of freedom in Khalil Rza Uluturk's work had a more abstract meaning in the 1950s and 1960s, primarily manifesting as a product of romantic imagination. However, in the 1970s, he began to revive the national spirit in his poems on international themes, analyzing universal values through the prism of national perspectives and started to search for universal ideas in the national context and vice versa. During the 1960s and 1970s, his thoughts on independence were expressed indirectly, in a subtle manner. However, starting from the late 1970s and into the 1980s, these ideas became stronger and more explicitly articulated, clearly reflecting the poet's national objectives and freedom ideology.

During these years, the poet published three books: "Məhəbbət dastanı" (The Epic of Love) (1961), "Mənim günəşim" (My Sun) (1963), and "Qollarını geniş aç" (Open Your Arms Wide) (1965). Some of the poetic samples written in the 1960s include: "Nifrətim var" (I Have Hatred) (1960), "And içirəm" (I Swear) (1962), "Şəlalə kimi" (Like a Waterfall) (1962), "Ermitaj və Avrora" (The Hermitage and Aurora) (1962), "Ürək qızıl gülə bənzər" (The Heart Resembles a Golden Rose) (1962), "Əyilmə" (Do Not Bow) (1962), "Qonaq çağırıram bəşəriyyəti" (I Call Humanity as a Guest) (1963), "Vəzifə" (Mission) (1967), "Mən Şərqəm" (I`am East) (1968). In his poem "Vətən, ya ölüm" (Fatherland or Death) (1960-1962), the subject is the liberation struggle of the Cuban people, while the poem "Kürd şairinə məktub" (Letter to a Kurdish Poet) (1963) is inspired by the life of the Kurdish people. The poet gives a title to the poem based on the same thought by the Cuban leader F. Castro (Fatherland or Death!), transitioning to international themes and motifs, personalizing the idea of freedom and what is essentially national—his faith and ideal.

The initial seeds and roots of the ideas of people's fate and unity appear in Khalil Rza's works of the 1960s. In his poems "Oğlum Təbrizə" (To My Son Tabriz) (1964) and "Anam layla çalır" (My Mother Sings the Lullaby) (1966), he includes details and vivid representations of real life. With a wise and concise expression style close to the folk bayati, he successfully reflects his ideal and the fate of the people in implicit and subtextual meanings.

In these poems, the poet's love, heroism, and spirit of freedom are rooted in his ancestral homeland. Other poems on this theme include "Doğma ev" (Native Home) (1960), "Analar" (Mothers) (1960–61), "Mənim övladlarım" (My Children) (1962), "Anam ocaq qalayır" (1965), "Oğullar gərəkdir Azərbaycana" (Sons Are Needed for Azerbaijan) (1966), "Oyatmağa qıymaram" (I Will Not Allow Them to Wake Up) (1967), "Oğullarıma" (To My Sons) (1967), "Atanın şer dəftərindən" (From My Father's Poetic Notebook) (1968), "Yatır gül balalarım" (Sleep, My Flower Children) (1968), "Üzü nurlu anam mənim" (1969), "Qollarım üstündə" (On My Arms) (1969), "Sərvətim" (My Wealth) (1969), "Balalarım" (My Children) (1970), "Gizli iftixar" (Secret Pride) (1970), "Səadətim" (My Happiness) (1970), "Rzam üçün" (For My Rza), "Ata ev tikir" (Father Builds a Home), "Biz gəldi-gedərik, Vətən əbədi" (We Come and Go, but the Fatherland is Eternal) and others.

Looking at the poetic examples of the 1960s, it is possible to conclude that Khalil Rza Uluturk is a poet deeply connected to nature. His poems dedicated to nature are rich in both objective and analytical content, depicting the aesthetic beauty of nature. In the poems of the 1950s, Rza's attitude towards nature nourished his hopes and emotions, while in the poems of the 1960s (1960-1964), this is manifested primarily in metaphors and comparisons.

The poet's poems "Bahar" (Spring) (1960), "Yeni pəncərələr" (New Windows) (1960), "Göygöldə sübh açılır" (Dawn Breaks in Goygol) (1961), "Mən Dneprə vurulmuşam" (I am in love with the Dnieper) (1961), "Riqa körfəzində günəşin qürubu" (Sunset in the Gulf of Riga) (1961), "Günəşin yarısı görünür ancaq" (Only Half of the Sun Is Visible) (1961), "Bir dəstə çiçək" (A Bunch of Flowers) (1961), "Bakı bağları" (Baku Gardens) (1961), "Bahar kimi" (Like Spring) (1962), "Qızıl balıq və şəlalə" (Goldfish and Waterfall) (1962), "Sonsuz qüvvət" (Endless Power) (1962), "Ömrümdə Kür çayını bu rəngdə görməmişdim" (I Have Never Seen the Kura River in This Color) (1962), "Göyçayda payız səhəri" (Autumn Morning in Goychay) (1963), "Dəlidağ" (Delidag Mountain) (1963), "Uşaq bağçası dənizdə" (Kindergarten by the Sea) (1964), "Quba bağları" (Quba Gardens) (1960-1968), "Güldəstə toplayıram" (I Gather a Bouquet) (1965), "Aç qoynunu, ana torpaq" (Open Your Arms, Motherland) (1965), "Gül bağında düşüncələr" (Thoughts in the Flower Garden) (1966), "Qobustan qayaları" (The Rocks of Gobustan) (1966), "Bütün fəsillərdə bahar yaşayır" (Spring Lives in All Seasons) (1967), "Gəncənin çinarları" (The Plane Trees of Ganja) (1967), "Dəniz səni çağırır" (The Sea Calls You) (1967), "Dəniz kimi yaşamaq" (Living Like the Sea) (1967), "Xəzərdən ayrıla bilmirəm" (I Cannot Separate from the Caspian) (1967), "Qar altında bahar" (Spring Under the Snow) (1968), "Çağırır Göyçay məni" (Goychay Calls Me), "Daşın ətri" (The Smell of Stone) (1968), "Sən mənə bənzəyirsən" (You Resemble Me) (1969), "Babalar yatan yerdə" (Where the Ancestors Sleep) (1969), "Baharda" (In Spring) (1969), and "Həftədə bir kərə, ayda bir kərə" (Once a Week, Once a Month) (1969) express a pastoral idyl, artistic images, and deep layers of thought.

The 1970s to 1980s, during which Khalil Rza Uluturk is recognized as the "Independence Poet," is marked by the prominence of national elements in his poetry. In the poetry of the 1970s, he penetrated into national life and the world both morally and psychologically. During these years, several of his poetry books were published: "Yeni zirvələrə" (To New Heights) (1971), "Ucalıq" (Elevation) (1973), and "Doğmalıq" (Nativism) (1977).

Khalil Rza Uluturk, in his lyrical-epic style, focuses on historical and contemporary events, evaluating them through lyrical-psychological and analytical aspects. Particularly in his works from the 1970s, his social protests address the moral-psychological and socio-political injustices created by the environment and circumstances, as well as international chauvinism, exploitation, colonialism, and imperial ambitions. The poet's social protests begin with an introspection of his inner world. Examples of this self-expression can be found in works like "İlham" (Inspiration) and "Səməndər quşu kimi" (Like the Bird of Samandar). Later, themes of self-discovery and self-acknowledgment expand and are clearly expressed in works such as "And içirəm" (I Swear) (1974), "Silkələnmə" (Shaking) (1975), and "Qarşıdadır" (Facing) (1979).

While Khalil Rza speaks out against indifference, inertia, and apathy in society, he sometimes expresses his stance through satire and critique. In these works, he refers to the traditions of M.Ə.Sabir, illuminating the social problems of his time with sharp satirical approaches. In poems like "Heç olmaz ki..." (It Can't Be...), "İşsiz kişilər" (Unemployed Men), and "Düşüncələr" (Thoughts), he demonstrates poetic sensitivity and a civic stance towards these problems.

In his works up to the 1980s, Khalil Rza approached the socio-political structure in a lyrical-epic style. During this period, his creativity stands out in terms of artistic expression and emotional depth. However, in the works of the 1980s, the poet's rebellious and denialist stance towards society begins to emerge more clearly. This change reveals strong journalistic characteristics and a pathetically intense tone in his artistic creativity. Khalil Rza Uluturk directed his social protests in his poetry of the 1980s primarily against the Russian Soviet Empire and international imperialism. This reflects the spirit of struggle against political and social issues in his literature. During these years, the poet published the following books: "Taparam səni" (I Will Find You) (1980), "Ömürdən uzun gecələr" (Longer than Life Nights) (1982), "Hara gedir bu dünya" (Where Is This World Going) (1983), "Daşdan çıxan bulaq" (Spring from Stone) (1986), and "Məndən başlanır Vətən" (The Homeland Begins with Me) (1988).

The themes in the poet's works of the 1980s typically revolve around the fate of the homeland and national ideals. These slogans are more clearly reflected in his poems "Səngər azuqəsi" (The Trench Provision) (1980), "Şəhriyarım" (My Shahriyar) (1980), "Çətin yol" (Difficult Road) (1981), and "Mənə bənzə" (Be Like Me) (1981).

In Khalil Rza Uluturk's poetry, the lyrical hero is presented as a strong and unwavering figure serving national ideals. In the poetry of the 1980s, this hero transforms into a symbol that reflects both national-spiritual values and the fate of the people. By creating a real image of national character, the poet aims to instill courage, determination, and the spirit of struggle in people. The idea of "being brave" holds an important place in his works and is expressed through the lyrical hero. The struggle position of the lyrical hero is manifested not only in the confrontation with Soviet antipodes but also in the fight against antihumanism. The poet's humanism is rooted not only in nationalism but also reflects a broader, international humanism.

Uluturk pays special attention to the spiritual values of the individual—courage, will, and bravery. In his view, the source of these qualities is the homeland. In his poems, he advises people to lead an active, honorable, and spiritually fulfilling life. Poems like "Şairin özülü" (The Poet's Foundation) (1980), "Mən uçuram" (I Fly) (1980), "Sükan dalındayam" (I'm at the Helm) (1980), "Təbrizli Şəhriyar yazır" (The Shahriyar from Tabriz Writes) (1980), "Dəmirləşən dözüm" (Iron Will) (1980), "Qorx, qorxma" (Fear, Don't Fear) (1982), "Min bir dərdin dərmanı" (The Cure for a Thousand Sorrows) (1982), "Müşfiqdənmi artığam, ya Şandor Petefidən?" (Am I More than Müşfiq or Sandor Petefi?) (1982), "Mayakovski ilə söhbət" (Conversation with Mayakovski) (1982), and "Sən inanma məddahlara" (Don't Believe the Flatterers) (1986) are examples of poems written in this vein.

From 1988 to 1990, Khalil Rza Uluturk was one of the leading poets of the national liberation movement, becoming a political provocateur and propagandist artist. During this period, his works became a strong expression of national struggle and ideals of freedom. Among the works the poet wrote during these years are "Azərbaycan-türk salamı" (Azerbaijani-Turkish Greeting), "Azadlığım" (My Freedom), "Sarsılmazdır qüdrətimiz" (Our Unshakeable Strength) (1988), "Sumqayıt dastanı" (Sumgayit Epic) (1988), "Silahlan" (Arm Yourself) (1988), "Tonqallar meydanı" (Bonfire Square), "Azərbaycan" (Azerbaijan), "Qalx ayağa, Azərbaycan" (Stand Up, Azerbaijan), "Azadlıq meydanı" (Freedom Square), "Tanklar Bakıya girən gecə" (The Night Tanks Enter Baku), "Şuşam" (My Shusha) (1989), "Qara tabutlar gəlir" (Black Coffins Are Coming) (1989), "Yaşasın Xalq Cəbhəsi" (Long Live the People's Front) (1989), "Müstəqillik" (Independence) (1989), "Qanlı cəllada" (To the Bloody Executioner, M.S. Gorbachev) (1990), "Qovacağız" (We Will Embrace) (1990), and others. These poems reflect his active position in the struggle for freedom and his political-social calls.

In Khalil Rza Uluturk's creativity, the ideas of Turkism hold significant importance. With the beginning of the national-democratic movement in Azerbaijan in the 1980s and the restoration of independence in 1991, the ideas of Turkism gained greater ideological and cultural significance. During this period, Khalil Rza's creativity was enriched by the poetic power of these ideas. In his works such as "Qalx ayağa, Azərbaycan" (Stand Up, Azerbaijan), "Yalnız pasportunda" (Only in Your Passport), "Boz qurda öygü" (Lament for the Grey Wolf), and "Mən günəş ürəkli Khalil Rzayam", Turkism is emphasized as a fundamental indicator of national identity.

The book "Davam edir 37..." (It Continues 37...) published by the poet in 1992 is one of the most significant examples of his creativity. The book collects works written by the poet in the genre of political lyricism. The poem "Davam edir 37..." which bears the name of the book, is one of Khalil Rza Uluturk's principal programmatic poems. In 1990, while imprisoned, Khalil Rza wrote more than 2000 pages of work in Lefortovo prison. Among these works are translations from A.S. Pushkin, M.Y. Lermontov, and A. Blok, as well as poems dedicated to his wife Firangiz.

The works Khalil Rza wrote while in prison are considered a continuation of the poetic traditions known as "Həbsiyyə" in Azerbaijani literature, following in the footsteps of Xaqani Shirvani and Fələki Shirvani. His political poems written after his release are still kept in his personal archive. Khalil Rza Uluturk's "Həbsiyyə" poems begin with "Xüsusi təyyarədə" (On the Special Plane) written on January 28, 1990, and conclude with the poem "Poeziya hökmdarı" (The Ruler of Poetry) completed in September 1990. The poet published these works under the title "Qıfılı o üzdən qapılar" (The Doors Locked from That Side) in the book "Davam edir 37...". The initial forms of the thoughts in the "Həbsiyyə" poems can be found in Khalil Rza's prison diaries. Works like "Yox, mən qaça bilməzdim" (No, I Could Not Escape), "Dustaq" (Prisoner), "Təbrik, Nelson Mandela" (Congratulations, Nelson Mandela), "Salam, Boris Pasternak!" (Hello, Boris Pasternak!), Bakıdan gələn bağlama (The Package from Baku), and others indicate that the poet immediately recorded the events, facts, meetings, and memories that influenced him in his diaries, later using these notes as the basis for his poems.

Khalil Rza Uluturk used various pen names in his works. Names such as X. Xəlilbəyli (Kh. Khalilbayli), Khalil Rza (Khalil Rza), Odsevər (Fire Lover), and Xəlil Xəlilzadə (Khalil Khalilzade) appear in his literary legacy. In the 1960s, some of his poems were published under the pen names Od (Fire) and Odsevər (Fire Lover). However, Uluturk was later prohibited from using the pseudonym Od-Odsevər. The poet only began using his real name approximately five years before his death. After Uluturk's death, his works, poems, and translations were continued to be published under the name Khalil Rza Uluturk by his wife, Firangiz. The name Khalil Rza Uluturk, which he adopted four years, five months, and 22 days before his death, is regarded as the result of his lifelong struggle and as a reflection of his true identity.

=== Long poems ===
Khalil Rza Uluturk wrote dozens of works in the genre of the long poem (poema), which emerged as a new literary form in Soviet-era Azerbaijani poetry. According to the poet, a long poem must be rich with themes of dignity, patriotism, an honorable life, heroism, and self-sacrifice. He emphasized that even if the hero depicted in the poem is not a positive character, the work must reflect a positive ideal. Uluturk's long poems are epic in nature. Works like Məhəbbət Dastanı (The Epic of Love), Atalar-Oğullar (Fathers and Sons), Az ömürlü ağ günlər (Short-Lived Bright Days), and Tufandan güclülər (Stronger Than the Storm) are literary pieces where epic depictions take center stage.

In Məhəbbət Dastanı (The Epic of Love), Khalil Rza lyrically presents his universal thoughts, recalling revolutionary movements in China, Poland, Germany, Africa, Hungary, Egypt, Korea, and Southern Azerbaijan while expressing protest against the horrors of Hiroshima. Atalar-Oğullar (Fathers and Sons) addresses the theme of war, portraying national and universal ideas and destinies. The lyrical poem Bayatı-Şiraz (Bayati-Shiraz, 1964–1972) explores the poet's understanding of humanity and the world through national and universal values. Dedicated to the soil scientist Barat Jafarli and the natural beauty of Zagatala, this work reflects the poet's appreciation for nature. Similarly, Qanadlılar (The Winged Ones) focuses on nature, specifically the Gizilaghaj Reserve, while Əfsanəli bir ölkə (A Legendary Land, 1977) is inspired by academician Hasan Aliyev's book Həyəcan Təbili (The Alarm Bell).

The 1971 long poem Həsrət (Longing) centers on Southern Azerbaijan, expressing a lyrical connection to Tabriz and its historical past. The call for self-return and self-realization is a key theme in this poem, which is also reflected in Təbrizli şairin düşüncələri (Thoughts of a Poet from Tabriz, 1970).

During the 1980s, Uluturk composed works such as Hara gedir bu dünya? (Where Is This World Going?), İki qardaşın söhbəti (The Conversation of Two Brothers), Ağ günlərin qaraldımı? (Have the Bright Days Dimmed?), Çinar sınar, əyilməz, Məni bir dərd yandırır (A Sorrow Burns Me), Qalx ayağa, Vətənim (Rise, My Homeland), Məktublar gedər-gələr (Letters Go Back and Forth), O gün gələcək (That Day Will Come), and Vətən oğlu (Son of the Homeland).

One of Uluturk’s prominent works from the 1980s, Hara gedir bu dünya? (Where Is This World Going?), embodies the ideals of Azerbaijan’s national liberation and the establishment of a democratic government. Written in an epic-lyrical style, it depicts the Azerbaijani Turks’ struggle against the Soviet regime's attempts to destroy Azerbaijan's national values and history. Other works from this period, such as İki qardaşın söhbəti (The Conversation of Two Brothers), focused on Southern Azerbaijan, while Qalx ayağa, Vətənim (Rise, My Homeland) and Məni bir dərd yandırır (A Sorrow Burns Me) were dedicated to the poet Sohrab Tahir.

The long poem Əlvida Azərbaycan (Farewell, Azerbaijan), written in Lefortovo prison, is particularly significant. It vividly describes the events of 1988, the January 20 tragedy, and the nationalist movements in Azerbaijan. Despite its sorrowful and mournful tone, the poem concludes on an optimistic note.

In Dənə gələn toyuqlar (Chickens That Come for Grain, 1983), the poet likens Earth to a massive web and notes that "planes and trains carry grain somewhere." The work portrays the bloodshed in various countries and advocates for global peace and freedom as the poet’s ideal and humanity’s destiny.

After joining the independence movement, Uluturk wrote Məftillə sarınmış yaralar (Wounds Wrapped in Barbed Wire) in the context of the socio-political events of the 1990s. Qanım bayrağımdadır (My Blood Is in My Flag), dedicated to the martyrs of January 20, addresses national freedom. This long poem, composed of lyrical fragments written between 1991 and 1994, views contemporary martyrdom as a continuation of the freedom martyrdom of 1918. Məftillə sarınmış yaralar (Wounds Wrapped in Barbed Wire) consists of a series of dramatic episodes and was compiled by his wife Firangiz.

Selected Long poemss by Khalil Rza Uluturk:

- Məktublar Gedər-Gələr (Letters Go Back and Forth)
- O Gün Gələcək... (That Day Will Come...)
- Şuşa Səfəri (Journey to Shusha): Based on impressions from his trip to Shusha in the 1970s.
- Adımız, Soyadımız (Our Name and Surname, 1965): Begins with the search for the meaning of the lyrical hero’s name and later highlights Jafar Jabbarli's contributions to promoting Turkism.
- Sən Mənə Bir Silah Verdin (You Gave Me a Weapon, 1986): Inspired by the poet’s impressions after reading Ilyas Efendiyev’s novel Ideal.
- Ürəyimdə Qalan Tikan (The Thorn Left in My Heart, 1985)
- Yadındamı, Səmirə (Do You Remember, Samira?, 1986)
- Eldənizə Cavabım (My Response to Eldeniz): Addresses socio-political events with the poet’s reflections.

=== Translations ===
In addition to his poems, Khalil Rza Uluturk undertook literary translations from world literature. The depth of his translation skills and the richness of his literary language become evident when examining his translated works from world literature and classical Turkish literature. Literary critic Alizade Asgarli, upon exploring X.R. Uluturk’s archives, discovered a folder containing selected translations from the years 1955–1965. He surmises that Khalil Rza began his translation work in 1955 and continued until the end of his life. The poet’s first translation was Laptev’s Balacalar (The Little Ones).

From the 1970s onward, Khalil Rza Uluturk’s translations, published in the republic's press, consistently attracted readers' attention. His persistent and systematic approach to translating poetry culminated in the publication of several books, including Qardaşlıq çələngi (The Wreath of Brotherhood, 1982), Dünyaya pəncərə (A Window to the World, 1984, reprinted in 2010), Turan çələngi (The Turan Wreath, 1992), Qutadqu bilik (1994), Yeddi gözəl (Seven Beauties, posthumously in 2000), and İsgəndərnamə (The Book of Alexander, 2002).

Published in 1982, Qardaşlıq çələngi is one of Khalil Rza Uluturk’s most successful translations, showcasing high literary value. In this work, Uluturk translated poems from 111 poets from Russian into Azerbaijani Turkish. The 2010 edition of Dünyaya pəncərə spans 72 printing sheets or 1,151 pages, featuring translated poetry from 28 nations, including Greek, Hungarian, Bulgarian, Czech, German, Japanese, French, English, Italian, Afghan, and Indian poets.

In his book Dünyanın ədəbi xəritəsi (The Literary Map of the World), Khalil Rza Uluturk not only presented literary examples from various world nations but also provided concise and insightful information about the authors he translated. For instance, regarding Uzbek poetry, he mentioned Alisher Navoi, M. Shayxzoda, A. Arif, Saida Eyni, Zulfiya, J. Kamal, Gafur Ghulam, and Abdulla Qahhor. In Kalmyk poetry, he highlighted David Kugultinov; in Turkmen poetry, Makhtumkuli; in Kazakh literature, Abai Kunanbayev and M. Avezov. He also referenced Turkish literary figures like Tevfik Fikret and Jalal al-Din Rumi, and Persian poets like Saadi and Omar Khayyam.

From Slavic literatures, he translated works by Russian writers such as Konstantin Simonov, Alexander Blok, Andrey Voznesensky, Yevgeny Yevtushenko, Nikolay Tikhonov, V. Lugovskoy, Ilya Selvinsky, and Nikolay Nekrasov; Ukrainian poet Taras Shevchenko; Belarusian writers Yanka Kupala and Yakub Kolas; and Baltic poets such as R. Rummo, U. Lant, L. Seppel, and L. Koidula (Estonian); I. Auzin, V. Belševica, M. Čaila, and A. Skalbe (Latvian); and Š. Vladas, K. Donelaitis, E. Meželaitis, J. Marcinkevičius, A. Maldonis, A. Baltakis, and V. Kalinauskas (Lithuanian).

Additionally, Khalil Rza Uluturk contributed to European and American literatures by translating works from German (e.g., Johann Wolfgang von Goethe, Heinrich Heine, Ludwig Frank), French (e.g., Paul Éluard, Louis Aragon), Italian (e.g., Francesco Petrarca), and English (e.g., William Shakespeare, Lord Byron) literature, as well as The Song of Hiawatha by Henry Wadsworth Longfellow.

Khalil Rza Uluturk enriched comparative studies of Turkish literatures through his translations not only from world languages but also from Uzbek, Tatar, Turkmen, Turkish, and Kazakh. Among his notable contributions were translations of M. Shayxzoda’s plays Cəlaləddin Manquberdi (Jalal al-Din Manguberdi) and Mirzə Uluqbəy (Mirza Ulugbek) into Azerbaijani. His book Turan çələngi (The Turan Wreath, 1992; 2005) united writers and poets of the Turan world in a single platform. Uluturk translated works from 53 Turkish artists, including Qutadqubilig by Yusuf Khass Hajib, Uluqbəyin mədhi (Praise of Ulugbek) by Saqqaki, and various works by Alisher Navoi, Babur Rahim Mashrab, Cholpan, Osman Nasir, Gafur Ghulam, Zulfiya, Mir Mohsen, Hamid Ghulam, Şükürulla, and many others. He also regarded these poetry samples as a great national treasure.

Musa Calil’s Moabit dəftəri (The Moabit Notebooks), a series of poems, was translated from Tatar into Azerbaijani by Khalil Rza.

One of Uluturk’s most successful translations was Yusuf Balasaghuni’s poem Qutadqu bilik (Kutadgu Bilig, 1998; 2003), a work of significant importance for promoting knowledge and statehood.

Khalil Rza, who independently learned Persian, was praised by poetess Hokuma Billuri for his literary talent in translating from Persian and Russian. Billuri noted that Khalil Rza not only mastered the language of the works he translated but also deeply understood the style, essence, and cultural context of the authors.

Uluturk also showed great interest in the legacy of Nizami Ganjavi, writing several articles and translating Nizami’s works Sirlər xəzinəsi (Treasury of Secrets), Yeddi gözəl (Seven Beauties), and İsgəndərnamə (The Book of Alexander) into Azerbaijani. He translated Sirlər xəzinəsi directly from Persian, with additional reference to M. Nuri Gencosman’s Turkish literal translation. He engaged in the translation of "İsgəndərnamə" starting from the 1980s, bringing to life a poem with over 20,000 verses in Azerbaijan language. In addition to Nizami Gəncəvi, he also translated a portion of Xaqani Shirvani's "Töhfətül-İraqeyn" (Gift to the Iraqis), the ghazals of Saib Tabrizi, and some poems of Shahriyar into Azerbaijani.

Articles

Khalil Rza Uluturk began his journalistic activities in the 1950s. From the 1960s onwards, Khalil Rza Uluturk started to promote Azerbaijan's national-spiritual values more broadly. During this period, his articles such as "Sumqayıtın günəşi" (The Sun of Sumgayit), "Rüstəmin dilindən" (From Rustam's Tongue), "Nəğmə kimi ötən günlər" (Days Gone By Like a Melody), "Gözəlliyin keşiyində" (On the Guard of Beauty), "Bahar-bahar" (Spring-Spring), and "Qızıl gül kimi" (Like a Golden Rose) were dedicated to the regions of Sumgayit, Lankaran, Astara, and Ordubad.

The subjects of Khalil Rza Uluturk's articles written in the 1960s are diverse. The poet wrote about human spirituality, portrayed specific individuals, and addressed themes related to nature and historical figures. For instance, in articles titled "Göygöl kimi saf, gözəl" (Pure, Beautiful Like Lake Goygol), "Kəklik çolpaları" (Quail Flocks), "Bir salxım üzüm" (A Bunch of Grapes), "Qoşqarçay axan yerdə" (Where the Qoshgar River Flows), "Oğurlanmış dahi" (The Stolen Genius), and "Qayalar kimi qüdrətli" (As Powerful as Rocks), the relationships between nature and humanity are depicted extensively. Khalil Rza described the vibrant working life of the 1960s in a romantic and poetic language. His articles "Qeyrət vaxtıdır" (It’s Time for Honor) and "Qızıl gül kimi" focus on labor issues. The article "Qeyrət vaxtıdır" (October 1965) reflects the activities of the collective farm in the Salyan region and the characteristics of labor processes. This article presents information about the labor life of the region during that period. In the article titled "Qızıl gül kimi" (May 23, 1965), the production activities of the Ordubad canning factory, the daily work schedule of its employees, and the principles of the factory's operations are described. The essay "Fərhad kimi oğullar" (Sons Like Farhad) (May 17, 1965) provides information about the difficult conditions of workers in Nakhchivan's salt mines and mining activities.

The literary-journalistic articles written by Khalil Rza Uluturk in the second half of the 1960s mainly focus on well-known individuals and historical figures. For example, "Professor Əkrəm Cəfər danışır" (Professor Ekrem Jafar Speaks) (1969), "Qızıl gül düşür yada" (The Golden Rose Reminds) (1969) (about Prof. Abbas Zamanov), "Yusif Ziya Şirvanlı" (1969), "Səidə-xoşbəxt deməkdir" (Saida Means Happy) (1969) (about M. Sheykhzade's sister Saida Sheykhzade), "Saz və tüfəng ilə" (With a Saz and a Gun) (1967) (about the Lachin poet Sayyiah Muhammad), "Səngərdə doğulmuş sətirlər" (Lines Born in the Trench) (1967) (about war veteran Ahmad Ahmadov, who fought in the Caucasus, Ukraine, Belarus, and Poland), "Unudulmaz saatlar" (Unforgettable Hours) (1968) (about Hökumə Billuri), "Ənənə qol-budaq atır" (Tradition Spreads Branches) (1968), "Vaqif sənətinə yaraşan fırça" (The Brush Worthy of Vagif's Art) (1968) (about Ali Mina Tabrizli), "Əyyub Şirinzadə" (1969), "Öləndən sonra da yaşayır insan" (A Person Lives Even After Death) (1969), and "Şairin sevgilisi" (The Poet’s Beloved) (1969) provide information about the lives, activities, and works of individuals such as Ekrem Jafar, Abbas Zamanov, Yusif Ziya Shirvanlı, Saida Sheykhzade, Sayyiah Muhammad, Ahmad Ahmadov, Ilyas Ibrahim, Hokuma Billuri, Sohrab Tahir, Ayyub Shirin, Sakina Sheykhzade, Mirza Ibrahimov, and Ali Mina Tabrizli.

In Khalil Rza Uluturk's scientific articles, the philosophical depth of national poetry, the political landscape of the era, humanism, Turkism, patriotism, and independence ideologies are explored. His articles written in the 1960s, including "Qüdrətli sənətkar" (Mighty Artist), "Fikir və məna şairi" (Poet of Thought and Meaning) (1962), "Dəli Kür romanı – Azərbaycan nəsrinin nailiyyəti kimi" (The Novel Deli Kur – An Achievement of Azerbaijani Prose) (1962), "Səssiz güllələr" (Silent Bullets) (1965), and "Vətəndaş poeziyası uğrunda" (For the Sake of Citizen Poetry) (1967), are literary-scientific investigations of Azerbaijani literature. These writings analyze theoretical issues of Azerbaijani literature and the literary development trends of the era.

On November 6, 1968, Khalil Rza Uluturk wrote an article titled "Niyazi düz deyir" (Niyazi Speaks Correctly) and faced pressures for a long time due to this article. In it, he assigns moral value to the words "lady" and "gentleman" and proposes their usage. He placed the suffixes "lı, li, lu, lü" against all other surname suffixes. The article states:

"Pay attention to the beauty and neatness in the names and titles such as Cəfər Cabbarlı, Firudin bəy Köçərli, Ənvər Əlibəyli, Əfrasiyab Bədəlbəyli, Şəmsi Bədəlbəyli, Fərhad Belədbəyli, Fəridə Əliyarbəyli, Mikayıl Rəfili, Nigar Rəfibəyli, Novruz Gəncəli, İslam Səfərli, and Əliağa Kürçaylı. When the suffix "li" encounters a phonetic obstacle (for example, "Əlili" doesn’t sound good), using "bəyli" is completely compatible with the people's taste and language."

In the literary-journalistic articles Khalil Rza Uluturk wrote in the 1970s, the memoir style is notable. The writings of this period reflect the unity of national and universal values. For example, articles such as "Millilik sənətkarın şüurlu fəaliyyətindən doğmalıdır" (National Identity Should Arise from the Conscious Activity of the Artist) (1971), "Milli özəlliklər" (National Particularities) (1971), "Böyük Axuminin sorağında" (In Search of the Great Akhumi) (February 21, 1973), "Əziz, sevimli Suyimə xanım!" (Dear, Beloved Suyimeh Khanum!) (February 8, 1975), "Qardaşım Əli Mahmud" (My Brother Ali Mahmud) (June 23, 1971), "Türkana doğru" (Towards Turkana) (June 26, 1971), and "Alimin qayğıları" (The Concerns of the Scholar) (February 18, 1973) can be noted. The article "Zaqatala muzeyində" (At the Zagatala Museum) (June 4, 1972) was prepared based on the same-named work of Doctor of Philological Sciences Qazanfar Beqdeli. The article is recorded in the archive under the signature "X.R."

Khalil Rza Uluturk primarily wrote scientific articles about Azerbaijani intellectuals and writers in the 1970s and 1980s. He expressed his views by focusing on the themes of citizenship and national motives in the poems of poets such as Nizami, Nesimi, Sohrab Tahir, Məmməd Araz, Sabir Rustamkhanli, Huseyn Arif, Huseyn Javid, T. Bayram, F. Sadiq, Ali Karim, and Z. Vafa. His articles touching on national and historical issues, the ideals of Azerbaijan's independence, and themes of human freedom include:

- "Cəsurluqdur, bir də…" (Courage is...) (1988)
- "Həyata məhəbbət" (Love for Life) (1988)
- "Vaxtdan uca dayanmağı bacaranlar" (Those Who Can Stand Tall Above Time)
- "Musiqidən keçən ömür" (Life Through Music) (1988)
- "Şairliyin mahiyyəti" (The Essence of Being a Poet) (1976)
- "Şairlik və bədii tərcümə" (Poetry and Artistic Translation) (1976)
- "Qardaş xalqın sərvəti" (The Wealth of a Brother Nation) (1979)
- "Səadət və döyüş poeziyası" (The Poetry of Happiness and Battle) (1981)
- "Ümid və məhəbbət poeziyası" (Poetry of Hope and Love)
- "Yaddaşa inam" (Trust in Memory) (1988)
- "Sanki bir dağ yıxıldı" (It’s Like a Mountain Has Fallen) (1988)

The journalism of the 1980s stands out in terms of literary portraits and essays. "Qardaşlıq görüşü" (Brotherhood Meeting) (30 July 1980) is about Abbas Abdulla, "Misilsiz milli xəzinə" (Unmatched National Treasure) (16 December 1984) focuses on Firudin Shushali, "Zeynalımızla ilk görüş" (Our First Meeting with Zeynal) (10 January 1985) discusses Zeynal Mammadov, "Yeganə təsəllimiz" (Our Only Comfort) (12 March 1985) is about Alfi Qasimov, "Kürlə Xəzər qovuşamda" (At the Convergence of the Kura and the Caspian) (21 April 1986) pertains to Zabil Parviz, "Qardaşım, qardaşım Azər İmam" (My Brother, Azer Imam) (12 May 1985) is about Azer Turan, "Zindanda poeziya günəşi" (14 February 1986) focuses on Musa Jalil, "Möcüzələr diyarında" (In the Land of Miracles) (5 October 1986) discusses Mestan Guner, "Poeziyaya çevrilmiş dostluq" (Friendship Turned to Poetry) (4 December 1987) is about the Russian poet Vyacheslav Shoshin, and "Günəş heç bir kəsdən mükafat ummaz" (The Sun Asks No Reward from Anyone) (23 December 1987) focuses on Firudin Shushali.

In addition to translating the works of Nizami Ganjavi, Uluturk has written scientific articles that combine his understanding of national and literary contexts with Nizami's philosophical world and poetic aesthetics. The studies and scientific articles written by Uluturk about Nizami Ganjavi include:

- "Bütün Əsrlərin Yaşıdı" (Contemporary of All Centuries)
- "Mənəvi Günəşimiz" (Our Spiritual Sun) (1983)
- "Möhtəşəm Sənətin Hünər Bayrağı" (The Flag of Magnificent Art) (1979)
- "Böyük Müasirimiz" (Our Great Contemporary) (1979)
- "Sənət və Şeriyyət Tanrısı" (The God of Art and Poetry) (1979)
- "Yoldaş Nizami" (Comrade Nizami) (1979)
- "Bədii Sözün Tanrısı" (The God of Artistic Word) (1986)
- "Ey Fələkdən Uca İnsan"
- "Beşinin Birincisi" (The First Among the Five.)

=== Interviews ===
The interviews in Khalil Rza Uluturk’s journalistic work hold a special place. Several interviews were conducted with him in the 1970s. The content of these interviews is significant in terms of promoting national and spiritual values:

- In the interview titled "My Answers to the Questions of Our Beloved Poet, Master Bendaroglu" (February 5, 1976), cultural relations between nations and the tasks ahead were discussed.
- The interview "Listen to Our Colleague’s Conversation with Poet Khalil Rza" (1977) covered topics such as the purity of the mother tongue, the influence of classical heritage—including figures like M.S. Vazeh, Ajami Nakhchivani, Nasir al-Din Tusi, M. Fuzuli, Ashig Alasgar, and Aliagha Vahid—on youth, as well as attitudes toward national attire.
- In the interview titled "Answers to the Questions of Telemirror Colleagues Nazim Bey and Tariyel Bey" (April 8, 1980), issues like parental and child responsibility, the essence of poetry, the translation of "The Treasury of Mysteries", the ethnic composition of Azerbaijanis, the writing of the work "The Eagles of Krasnodon", learning the Tatar language, the staging of the play "Babak", and the limited attention given to translation efforts were discussed.

== Research on his legacy ==
Both research-based and biographical works written about Khalil Rza Uluturk provide multifaceted information about his life, creativity, and role in Azerbaijani literature. For example, the book "Ulutürk Bayramı" (Uluturk’s Celebration), published in 1992, presented selected works on the occasion of the poet’s 60th anniversary. This book, prepared by M.R. Khalilbeyli, reflects the richness of his poetry.

In 1994, the memoir book "Xəlil Rza: Kədərimlə Qol-Boyun" (Khalil Rza: Embraced by My Sorrow), written by his wife, Firangiz Uluturk, was published. In this work, Firangiz Khanum narrated the difficult moments in the poet’s life. Additionally, speeches delivered at Khalil Rza’s farewell ceremony were compiled and published in the book "Əsrlərin Sönməz Məşəli" (The Inextinguishable Torch of the Centuries).

In 1996, Mail Damirli delved deeper into his poetry in the dissertation "Xəlil Rza Ulutürkün Poeziyası" (The Poetry of Khalil Rza Uluturk), highlighting the ideological processes and the influence of the poet’s poems. Two years later, in 1998, Yavuz Akhundlu dedicated considerable space to Khalil Rza Uluturk in his book "İstiqlal Şairləri" (Poets of Independence), emphasizing his national spirit and struggle. During these years, the literary legacy of the poet was also seriously researched, for instance, in the collection of articles titled "İlk Allahım, Son Allahım – Mübarizə" (My First God, My Last God – Struggle), where the creative aspects of his works were extensively analyzed. Later, in 2001, Bakir Nabiyev shed light on his life and activities in the book "İstiqlal Şairi" (The Poet of Independence). This book serves as an important source for studying the poet’s legacy. Professor T. Ahmadov, in his article "İstiqlal Nəğməkarı Xəlil Rza Ulutürk" (The Independence Songwriter Khalil Rza Uluturk), described Khalil Rza as a patriotic poet, translator, and a socio-political figure fighting for the preservation of linguistic purity. In 2002, the work "Xəlil Rza Ulutürk [Album-Book]", enriched with visual materials, was published.

Moreover, Hagigat Karimova, in her book "Xəlil Rza Ulutürkün Fəlsəfi Görüşləri" (Philosophical Views of Khalil Rza Uluturk), published in 2002, explored the poet’s philosophical outlook and concept of national identity in detail. In the same year, the book "Vətənə Dönənim" (My Return to the Motherland), dedicated to the 10th anniversary of Khalil Rza’s son Tabriz Khalilbeyli, was presented to readers. Another work by Firangiz Khanum, "Xəlil Rza: Kədərimlə Qol-Boyun" (Khalil Rza: Embraced by My Sorrow), was reprinted in 2003. Additionally, in 2004, the drama "Düyünlənmiş Yumruq" (The Clenched Fist), written by Markaz Gajar, artistically reflected Khalil Rza’s life.

From 2004 onwards, the works published about Khalil Rza Uluturk show a deeper investigation into his creativity. In 2004, the book "Müasirləri Xəlil Rza Ulutürk Haqqında" (His Contemporaries About Khalil Rza Uluturk), edited and compiled by Firangiz Uluturk with Alizade Asgarli as the scientific editor, collected both his scientific works and memoirs. In the foreword, Bakir Nabiyev extensively discussed Khalil Rza Uluturk’s place in literature and his personality.

In 2005, the book "Milli İdeal Mücahidi" (The Fighter for National Ideals), written by Alizade Asgarli, was published. This monograph analyzes Azerbaijan’s social and literary processes through the lens of the poet’s works. The book was published under the editorial supervision of Teymur Ahmadov by the Institute of Literature named after Nizami at the Azerbaijan National Academy of Sciences. In 2007, Alizade Asgarli published the book "Xəlil Rza Ulutürkün Poetikası" (The Poetics of Khalil Rza Uluturk), where the main characteristics of the poet’s poetics and the aesthetics of his works were studied.In 2009, Alizade Asgarli published a broader monograph titled "Xəlil Rza Ulutürkün Poetikası: Monoqrafiya" (The Poetics of Khalil Rza Uluturk: A Monograph), comprising three sections that provided a detailed analysis of the historical, individual, and social aspects of the poet’s poems. In the same year, Bakir Nabiyev published the book "Seçilmiş Əsərləri: İstiqlal Şairi" (Selected Works: The Poet of Independence), which broadly reflected Khalil Rza Uluturk’s role in the struggle for independence.In 2012, Alizade Asgarli republished the book "Xəlil Rza Ulutürkün Poetikası" (The Poetics of Khalil Rza Uluturk) with expanded analyses of the poet’s creativity. That year, a methodological guide titled "Milli və Bəşəri Sənətkar" (A National and Universal Artist) was prepared for the 80th anniversary of Khalil Rza Uluturk’s birth.In 2015, Alizade Asgarli published the extensive monograph "Xəlil Rza Ulutürk: Həyatı, Fəaliyyəti, Sənəti" (Khalil Rza Uluturk: His Life, Activity, and Art), a 621-page comprehensive study presenting the poet’s life and works.

== Recognition ==
● In the cities of Baku, Shirvan, Salyan, Goygol, and Khachmaz, one of the central streets is named after Khalil Rza Uluturk.

● In Baku, a library is named after Khalil Rza Uluturk.

● A statue of Khalil Rza Uluturk is erected over his grave located in Baku.

● A park in the city of Salyan is named after Khalil Rza Uluturk.

● In Salyan, a bas-relief of Khalil Rza Uluturk is featured in the "Father-Son" memorial complex.

His 60th anniversary in 1995, 70th anniversary in 2004, and 80th anniversary in 2012 were commemorated at the state level. Khalil Rza's selected works in 1, 2, and 5 volumes were published by presidential decrees.

== Books ==
- Uluturk, Khalil Rza (1957). Bahar gəlir. Bakı: Uşaqgəncnəşr.
- Uluturk, Khalil Rza (1959). Bəhrəli gəlin. Moskva: Molodaya Qvardiya.
- Uluturk, Khalil Rza (1959). Səvən gözlər. Bakı: Azərnəşr.
- Uluturk, Khalil Rza (1961). Məhəbbət dastanı. Bakı: Uşaqgəncnəşr.
- Uluturk, Khalil Rza (1961). Poema o Lyubvi. Moskva: Sovetskiy Pisatel.
- Uluturk, Khalil Rza (1963). Mənim günəşim. Bakı: Azərnəşr.
- Uluturk, Khalil Rza (1963). Nastoyaşaya Lyubov (Əsil Sevgi). Moskva: Sovetskiy Pisatel.
- Uluturk, Khalil Rza (1965). Qollarını geniş aç. Bakı: Azərnəşr.
- Uluturk, Khalil Rza (1967). Krasnodon qartalları. Bakı: Gənclik.
- Uluturk, Khalil Rza (1971). Yeni zirvələrə. Bakı: Azərnəşr.
- Uluturk, Khalil Rza (1973). Ucalıq. Bakı: Gənclik.
- Uluturk, Khalil Rza (1977). Doğmalıq. Bakı: Azərnəşr.
- Uluturk, Khalil Rza (1980). Taparam səni. Bakı: Yazıçı.
- Uluturk, Khalil Rza (1981). Marallar da duz yeyərmiş. Bakı: Gənclik.
- Uluturk, Khalil Rza (1982). Ömürdən uzun gecələr. Bakı: Gənclik.
- Uluturk, Khalil Rza (1983). Hara gedir bu dünya. Bakı: Yazıçı.
- Uluturk, Khalil Rza (1986). Daşdan çıxan bulaq. Bakı: Gənclik.
- Uluturk, Khalil Rza (1988). Məndən başlanır vətən. Bakı: Yazıçı.
- Uluturk, Khalil Rza (1992). Davam edir 37. Bakı: Gənclik.
- Uluturk, Khalil Rza (1992). Ayla günəş arasında. Bakı: Yazıçı.
- Uluturk, Khalil Rza (1994). Uzun sürən gənclik. Bakı: Azərnəşr.
- Uluturk, Khalil Rza (1994). Mən şərqəm. Bakı: Elm Nəşriyyatı.

== Translated books ==
- Laptev, A. (1972). Balaca. Translated by Uluturk, Khalil Rza. Baku: Gənclik.
- Selvinski, Ilya (1975). Babək. Translated by Uluturk, Khalil Rza. Baku: Gənclik.
- Jalil, Musa (1979). Moabit dəftəri. Translated by Uluturk, Khalil Rza. Baku: Yazıçı.
- Qardaşlıq çələngi. Translated by Uluturk, Khalil Rza. Baku: Maarif. 1982.
- Dünyaya pəncərə. Translated by Uluturk, Khalil Rza. Baku: Maarif. 1984.
- Rozhdestvensky, Robert (1984). Otuzuncu əsrə məktub. Translated by Uluturk, Khalil Rza. Baku: Gənclik.
- Turan çələngi. Translated by Uluturk, Khalil Rza. Baku: Elm. 1993.
- Balasaguni, Yusuf (1994). Qutadğu-Bilik. Translated by Uluturk, Khalil Rza. Baku: Gənclik.
- Ganjavi, Nizami (1988). Sirlər xəzinəsi – Lirikası. Translated by Uluturk, Khalil Rza. Baku: Yazıçı.
- Ganjavi, Nizami (2000). Yeddi gözəl. Translated by Uluturk, Khalil Rza. Baku: Ensiklopediya.
- Ganjavi, Nizami (2002). İsgəndərnamə. Translated by Uluturk, Khalil Rza. Baku: Gənclik.
- Ganjavi, Nizami (2011). Lirika, "Sirlər xəzinəsi", "Yeddi gözəl" (reprint). Translated by Uluturk, Khalil Rza. Baku: İdeal-print.

== Literature ==
- Əliyeva, Aynurə (2017). Haqq pərvanəsi – Xəlil Rza (PDF) (in Azerbaijani). Bakı: Elm və təhsil nəşriyyatı. p. 40.
- Məmmədli, Ruhiyyə (2022). İstiqlal şairi Xəlil Rza (PDF) (in Azerbaijani). Bakı: F.Köçərli adına Respublika Uşaq Kitabxanası.
- XƏLİL RZA ULUTÜRK- Biblioqrafiya (PDF) (in Azerbaijani). Bakı: M.F.Axundov adına Azərbaycan Milli Kitabxanası. 2017. ISBN 978-9952-476-02-6.
- Ulutürk, Xəlil Rza (2005). Seçilmiş əsərləri (PDF) (in Azerbaijani). Vol. I. Bakı: Şərq-Qərb.
- Ulutürk, Xəlil Rza (2010). Dünyaya pəncərə (PDF) (in Azerbaijani). Bakı: Çınar-Çap.
- Ulutürk, Firəngiz (2004). Müasirləri Xəlil Rza Ulutürk haqqında (in Azerbaijani). Bakı: Çinar-Çap.
- Ulutürk, Firəngiz (2003). Kədərimlə qol-boyun (in Azerbaijani) (2-ci nəşr ed.). Bakı: Qorqud nəşriyyatı.
- Tahir, Söhrab (1999). Günəşdən pay alan şair (in Azerbaijani). Bakı: Gənclik.
- Nəbiyev, Bəkir (2009). İstiqlal şairi, Seçilmiş Əsərləri V cilddə (in Azerbaijani). Vol. III. Bakı: Çinar-Çap.
- Əsgərli, Əlizadə (2005). Milli İdeal Mücahidi (PDF) (in Azerbaijani). Bakı: Elm nəşriyyat. ISBN 5-8066-1780-7.
- Əsgərli, Əlizadə (2012). Xəlil Rza Ulutürkün poetikası (in Azerbaijani). Bakı: Aspoliqraf.
- Əsgərli, Əlizadə (2007). "Xəlil Rza Ulutürkün Humanizm və Vətənpərvərlik Baxışlarına Bir Nəzər" (PDF). Bakı Universitetinin Xəbərləri. 4: 30–34.
- Axundlu, Yavuz (1998). İstiqlal Şairləri (PDF) (in Azerbaijani). Bakı: Elm nəşriyyat. ISBN 5-8066-0949-9.
- Kərimova, Həqiqət (2002). Xəlil Rza Ulutürkün fəlsəfi görüşləri (in Azerbaijani). Bakı: Gənclik. ISBN 5-8020-1635-3.
- Günaydın, Yusif (2014). Xəlil Rza Ulutürk, Seçilmiş Əsərləri (in Azerbaijani). Bakı: Xalq Bank.
- Ulutürk, Firəngiz xanım (1998). Xəlil Rza Kədərimlə Qol-Boyun (in Azerbaijani). Bakı: Qorqud nəşriyyatı.
- MÜSTƏQİLLİK DÖVRÜ AZƏRBAYCAN ƏDƏBİYYATI (in Azerbaijani). Vol. I. Bakı: Elm və Təhsil. 2016. ISBN 978-9952-8176-9-0.
- Yıldırım, İrfan Murat (1992). "Halil Senin Sağlığına" (PDF). Kardeş Edebiyatlar. 21. Çağlayan Matbaası: 28–34.
