= Karamanlis =

Karamanlis or Karamanli may refer to:

- someone or something from Karaman, Turkey

== People ==
- The Karamanlis political family of Greece (Καραμανλής)
  - George Karamanlis (1880-1932), Greek teacher
  - Konstantinos Karamanlis (1907–1998), former President and Prime Minister of Greece
  - Kostas Karamanlis (born 1956), nephew of Konstantinos, former Prime Minister of Greece
  - Anastasia Pazaiti-Karamanli (born 1966), better known as Natasa Pazaïti, wife of Kostas
  - Achilleas Karamanlis (born 1932), son of George and brother of Konstantinos, MP 1974-2009 and government minister
  - Kostas Karamanlis (born 1974), son of Achilleas, MP since January 2015
- Anna Karamanli, Greek sportswoman and politician
- Marietta Karamanli (born 1964), French politician
- Karamanli dynasty (Turkish: Karamanlı) of Ottoman Tripolitania
  - Ahmed Karamanli (1686–1745), dynasty's founder and pasha of Tripolitania
  - Yusuf Karamanli (1766–1838), pasha of Tripolitania

== Places ==
- Karamania (region), a region of Asia Minor in Turkey
- Karamanlı, Burdur, a district of Burdur Province, Turkey
- Qaramanlı, Yevlakh Rayon, Azerbaijan
- Qaramanlı, Neftchala (disambiguation), several places in Azerbaijan

== Other uses ==
- Karamanlides, a Turkish-speaking Eastern Orthodox Christian group
  - Karamanli Turkish, a dialect of Turkish historically spoken by the group
- Karamanids, a historical Turkish dynasty in Asia Minor
- Stella Karamanlis, a character in the American miniseries The Pacific

== See also ==
- Karamanlı
- Karaman (disambiguation)
