= Ghahremani =

Ghahremani (Persian: قهرمانی) is a surname. Notable people with the surname include:

- Asghar Ghahremani (born 1972), Iranian futsal player
- Gary Ghahremani, Iranian-born American radiologist
- Mohsen Ghahremani (born 1974) Iranian football referee
- Sarou Ghahremani (1993–2018), Iranian Kurdish political prisoner
- Siamak Ghahremani (born 1974), Iranian-born American radio host
- Vida Ghahremani (1936–2018), Iranian film actress
- Arvin Ghahremani (born 2004), Iranian Jew attacked by 7 men in 2023. One killed by Ghahremani in self defense resulted in death sentence to be executed June 2024.

== See also ==
- Ghahreman
