= Qaramanlı, Neftchala =

Qaramanlı, Neftchala may refer to:

- Aşağı Qaramanlı
- Yuxarı Qaramanlı
