= Karamanlı =

Karamanlı can refer to:

- Karamanlı, Burdur, Turkey
- Karamanlı, Çivril, Turkey
- Karamanli Turkish, a dialect of Turkish language
- Karamanlı District
- Karamanlı Dam

== See also ==
- Karamanlis (disambiguation)
