= Karaman (disambiguation) =

Karaman is a town in south central Turkey, the provincial capital of Karaman Province.

Karaman may also refer to:

== People ==
- Aykut Karaman (born 1947), Turkish architect
- Karaman Bey (died 1261), founder of the Karamanids dynasty
- Hikmet Karaman (born 1960), Turkish football manager
- İlkan Karaman (born 1990), Turkish basketball player
- Ivo Karamanski (1959–1998), Bulgarian mobster
- Kenan Karaman (born 1994), Turkish football player
- Ljubo Karaman (1886–1971), Croatian art historian
- Sami Sabit Karaman (1877–1957), Turkish general
- Simay Karaman (born 1991), Turkish basketball player
- Stanko Karaman (1889–1959), Yugoslav biologist
- Ünal Karaman (born 1966), former Turkish footballer and manager

== Places ==
- Qaraman, a village in Azerbaijan
- Karaman, Çubuk, a village in Ankara Province, Turkey
- Karmi, Cyprus, a village in Cyprus
- Karaman Eyalet, administrative division of the Ottoman Empire
- Karaman, Kovancılar, a village in Turkey
- Karaman, Kurucaşile, a village in Bartın Province, Turkey
- Karaman Province, Turkey
  - Karaman (electoral district), the province's electoral district in the Turkish parliament

== Other uses ==
- Karamanids, Anatolian beylik, centered in Anatolia
- Karamanlides, a Greek Orthodox Turkish-speaking ethnic group

== See also ==
- Karamania, a region of Asia Minor (modern Turkey)
- Kahraman (disambiguation)
- Karamanlis (disambiguation)
- Karamana, a suburb in Thiruvananthapuram, Kerala, India
- Karamana River, a river in Kerala, India
