= Qaralı, Sabirabad =

Coordinates: 40°04′N 48°31′E

Qaralı is a village and municipality in the Sabirabad Rayon of Azerbaijan. It has a population of 658.
