= Ghahreman =

Ghahreman (Persian: قهرمان) is a surname. Notable people with the surname include:

- Ahmad Ghahreman (1928–2008), Iranian botanist and professor
- Azita Ghahreman (born 1962), Iranian poet

== See also ==
- Ghahremani
