= Tabriz Khalilbeyli =

- Born: 12 February 1964; Baku, Azerbaijan
- Died: 31 January 1992 (aged 27); Nakhichevanik
- Military career
- Allegiance: Republic of Azerbaijan
- Service years: 1991-1992
- Conflicts: First Nagorno-Karabakh War
- Awards: National Hero of Azerbaijan; 1992

Tabriz Khalil Rza oglu Khalilbeyli (Azerbaijani: Təbriz Xəlilbəyli) (12 February 1964, Baku, Azerbaijan – 31 January 1992, Nakhichevanik) was the National Hero of Azerbaijan, and warrior of the First Nagorno-Karabakh War.

== Early life and education ==
Khalilbeyli was born on 12 February 1964 in Baku, Azerbaijan SSR. In 1981, he completed his secondary education at the school No. 18 named after Mikayil Mushfig. In 1982, he entered Azerbaijan State University of Culture and Arts. Following his graduation, Khalilbeyli started to work at Azerbaijanfilm cinema studio named after J. Jabbarli.

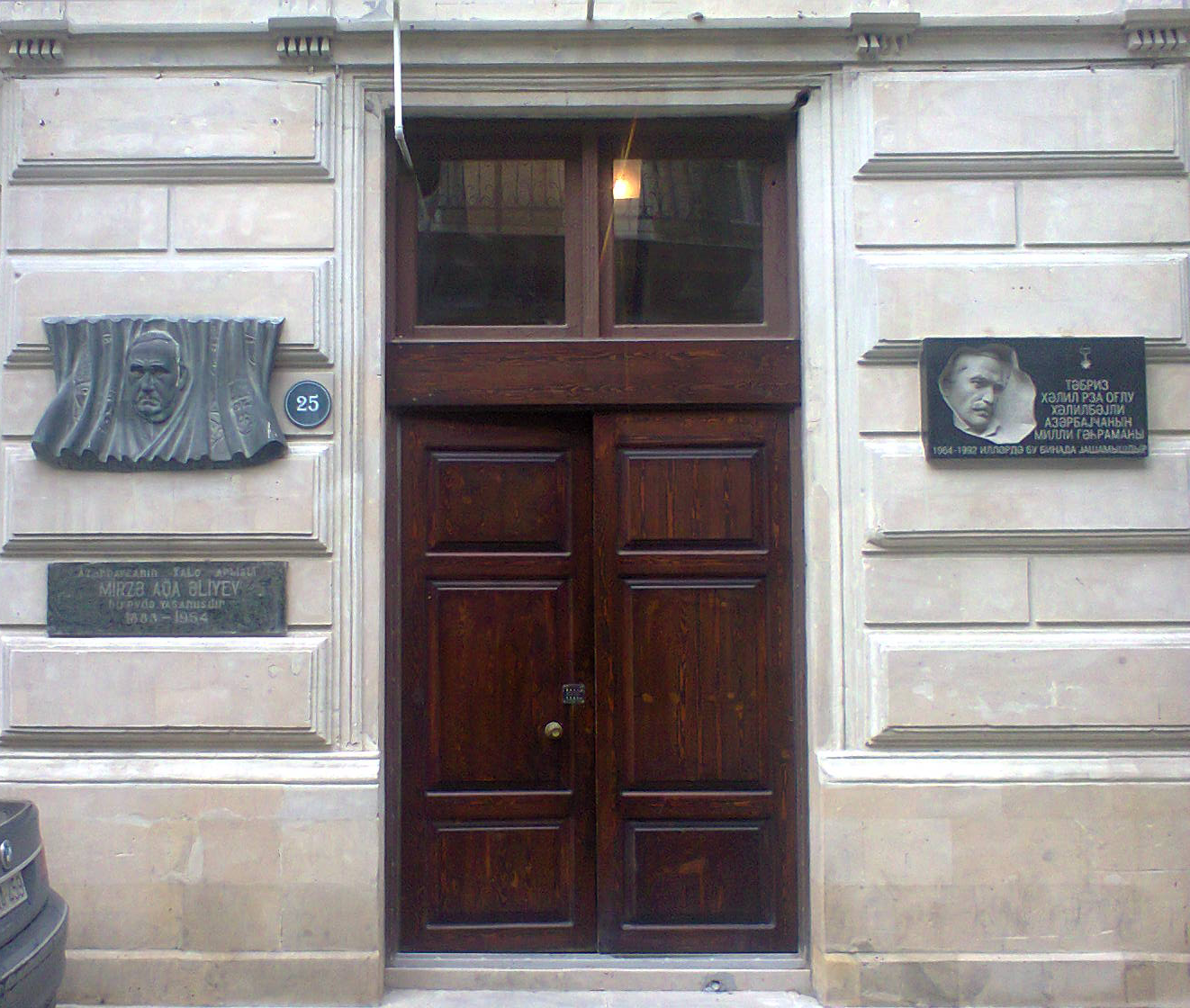
Tabriz Khalilbeyli street

Khalilbeyli was married and had two daughters.

== Nagorno-Karabakh war ==
When the First Nagorno-Karabakh War started, Khalilbeyli voluntarily enlisted in the Azerbaijani Army and went to the front-line. He participated in all battles around the villages of Khromord and Nakhichevanik. Tabriz Khalilbeyli was awarded the title of "Gray wolf" of The Ministry of Internal Affairs of Azerbaijan for his participation in the battles.

Khalilbeyli died in the Dashalty operation carried out by the Azerbaijani Army to regain the Dashalty village from Armenian armed units.

== Honors ==
Tabriz Khalilbeyli was buried at a Martyrs' Lane cemetery in Baku. He was posthumously awarded the title of the National Hero of Azerbaijan by the decree of the Azerbaijani President dated 8 October 1992.

One of the streets in Baku and Salyan District, and the ship used for special service were named after him.

== Sources ==
- Vugar Asgarov. Azərbaycanın Milli Qəhrəmanları (Yenidən işlənmiş II nəşr). Bakı: "Dərələyəz-M", 2010, səh. 131.

== See also ==
- First Nagorno-Karabakh War
- National Hero of Azerbaijan
