= Pirəbbə =

Pirabba
- Azerbaijani: Pirəbbə
- Location within Azerbaijan
- Coordinates: 39°29′55″N 49°00′37″E
- Country: Azerbaijan
- District: Neftchala
- Municipality: Yukhary Garamanly
- Time zone: UTC+4 (AZT)
  - Summer (DST): UTC+5 (AZT)

Pirəbbə (also, Pirappa) is a village in the Neftchala District of Azerbaijan. The village forms part of the municipality of Yukhary Garamanly.
