= Gary Ghahremani =

Iranian-born American radiologist)

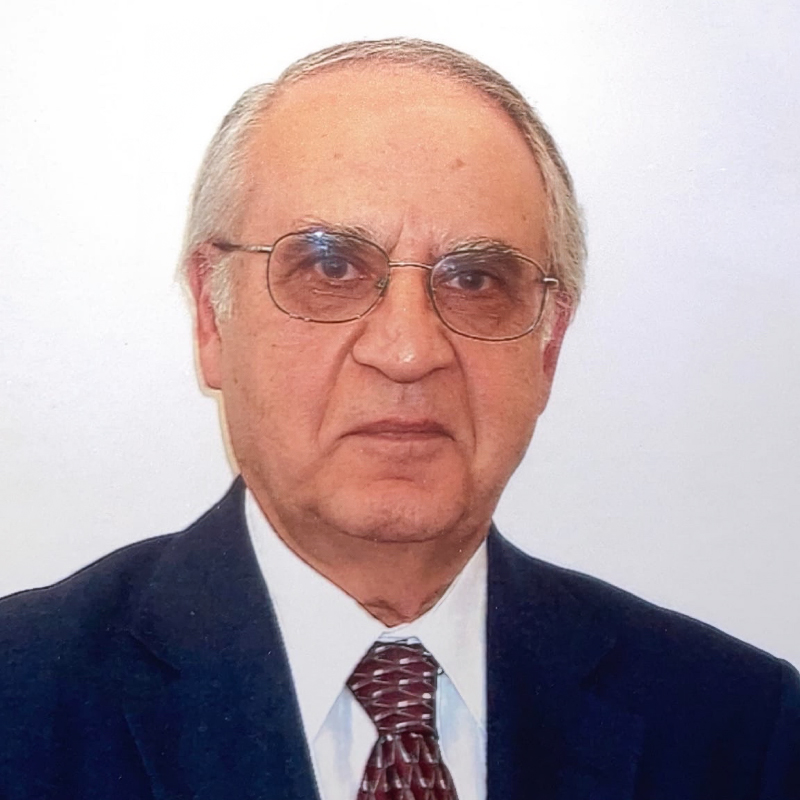
- Born: January 30, 1941; Tehran, Iran
- Education: University of Freiburg University of Chicago
- Occupation: Radiologist
- Medical career
- Institutions: Northwestern University; UC San Diego School of Medicine
- Sub-specialties: Diagnostic and gastrointestinal imaging

Gary G. Ghahremani is an Iranian-American radiologist specializing in diagnostic and gastrointestinal imaging with over 40 years experience as Professor of Radiology. His work has been cited in over 5000 medical papers.

== Career ==
After retiring as Evanston Hospital's Professor and chairman in the Department of Diagnostic Radiology, Ghahremani became a Clinical Professor of Radiology at the University of California Medical Center in San Diego. He is author of the textbook Iatrogenic Gastrointestinal Complications. As of 2022, Ghahremani has published over 150 scientific articles.

== Awards and honors ==
- JT O’Connell Award (Illinois Medical Society,1989)
- Magna cum laude (RSNA Scientific Exhibit,1997)
- Lifetime Achievement Award (UCSD-Radiology, 2009)
- Paul C. Hodges Excellence Award (University of Chicago- Radiology, 2011)
