= Sarou Ghahremani =

- Born: 1993
- Died: 12 January 2018 (aged 24); Beheshteh Mohammadieh Sanandaj, Iran
- Known for: Political prisoner

Sarou Ghahremani (1993 – 12 January 2018, born in Sanandaj, Iran) was an Iranian Kurdish citizen who was arrested after taking part in a protest rally against the Iranian government in Sanandaj. According to his family, on Friday, January 12, 2018, his death was reported to them after 11 days of his arrest by the Sanandaj Information Office. On January 13, his body was buried in the presence only of his parents.

== Family and friends remarks ==
=== Family ===
Sarou Ghahremani's family said that he had disappeared after taking part in the street protests in Sanandaj and had his body depopulated for burial after 11 days of his disappearance. A close friend of Ghahremani, on Saturday, January 13, quoted that Sarou's mother has mentioned that there were beating and whipping signs on Sarou's corpse. The Iranian security forces have warned Ghahremani's family that they have no right to be interviewed by the media. Sarou Ghahremani's mother, after her son's death, began to publish his photos of his lifetime by making an account on Instagram known as "Sarou, you’re mother's love".

Mohammad Reza Arian, a retired police colonel and Sarou Ghahremani's aunt's husband, in a conversation with the Kayhan Newspaper of London, expresses that "Sanandaj governor speaks of a threat to a person or people with weapons by Sarou on January 4."

This was while Sarou was present in the city and among his family since the dawn of January 12 without any problems. If someone had filed a complaint against him, it would undoubtedly be in the coming days and in order for the police to proof the complaint, they should go to Sarou's home and approach his family.

The governor of Sanandaj later argued that Sarou was killed in an armed conflict near the terminal. The retired colonel of the law enforcement agency has said that such an armed conflict has taken place inside the city and that no one has informed the citizens. Mohammad Reza Arian also referred to another young person, Kianoush Zand who was killed in the protests like Sarou Ghahremani. The existence of the numerous acts of torture and bruising on the body of Sarou without any marks on his body caused by armed conflict and shooting made him ask that if Sarou was killed in an armed conflict on the evening of January 12, then why was his body returned to his family after 11 days? Did they wanted to interrogate a body during these eleven days? Mohammad Reza Arian, also claims about the twice summons of Mohammad Ghahremani, the father of Sarou Ghahremani to the Sanandaj Information Office and he added that he was forced to make television confessions with a predetermined text. He simultaneously reports the heavy presence of plainclothes and intelligence forces at Mohammad Ghahremani's home. On January 14, another close relative of Sarou's family said that after the delivery of the body was released, officers of the Ministry of Intelligence came and took Sarou's father with them, and a few hours later, the video of his interview was broadcast from Islamic Republic of Iran Broadcasting. He mentioned that I don't know what they had said to him or threatened him with, but that video was a forced confession of a father against his son.

=== Friends ===
Also on January 14, 2018, when Sarou's death was released for the first time, actress Bahareh Rahnama, sharing a photo with Sarou Ghahremani, shared her sympathy with his family, saying that Sarou had been busy working in her restaurant since last year as a courier. Shortly after the actress's tweets condemning the death of Sarou Ghahremani, she released tweets about herself being threaten by the Sanandaj governor.

=== Funeral ===
According to the follow-up committee of the arrests in January 2018, Sarou's body was handed over to his family by the security guards for burial, and only his parents were allowed to accompany the ambulance carriage to Beheshteh Mohammadiyeh Sanandaj for burial, and other family members were not allowed to attend.

=== The Deceased ===
In the massive protests of Iran in January 2018, slogans were launched against Iran's internal and regional leaders and policies so according to the reports, more than 3,700 people have been arrested and at least 22 to 25 have been killed; but, so far till now, the identity of the deceased has not been announced. Officials of Iran have confirmed the death of 22-year-old Sina Ghanbari at Evin prison quarantine facility. The announcement of the death of Vahid Heidari in a detention center in Arak was also confirmed, while the cause of the death of both youngsters was announced by the Iranian government as suicidal acts. But this became the matter of their families protesting to clarify the causes of their deaths.

Mohsen Adeli is also one of the victims of the January 2018 unrests in Dezful, who is said to have lost his life in the detention center in prison. But government officials said that he was shot in the street protests and lost his life when he got to the hospital.

== Reaction ==
=== Internal ===
• No government official has ever responded to the death of Sarou Ghahremani at Sanandaj Information Detention Center.

• Mahmood Sadeghi, a member of the Iranian parliament, said that 40 MPs called for Larijani to form a committee to investigate the cause of the deaths of some of the detainees in the recent protests. He also said last week that more than 3,700 people were arrested during recent protests in Iran. • On the other hand, in recent days, many social and international activists have expressed concern about the "repetition of the Kahrizak scenario" and demand clear information about the situation of the detainees on the part of the Iranian government. In 2009, a number of the arrested protesters lost their lives due to the beatings and the inappropriate status of Kahrizak detention center.

• Othman Mizin, a Kurdish lawyer in his telegram channel, wrote in response to the deaths of citizens at the detention center: "The local detention facility is to deter a person from committing a crime, not a place to prevent him from continuing to live."

== International ==
• International human rights organizations such as Amnesty International, Human Rights Watch, and United States Department of State have expressed concern over the deaths of protesters detained in detention centers and called for an independent and immediate investigation into this matter.

• Four Nobel laureates called on the Iranian government to respect the rights of the protesters, especially the ones arrested in the detention centers.
