= Emre Kahraman =

Turkish footballer

Personal information
- Full name: Emre Kahraman
- Date of birth: 23 June 1987 (age 39)
- Place of birth: Trabzon, Turkey
- Height: 1.69 m (5 ft 6 1/2 in)
- Position: Midfielder

Team information
- Current team: Araklıspor

Youth career
- 1999–2006: Trabzonspor

Senior career*
Years	Team	Apps	(Gls)
2007–2008	Trabzonspor	0	(0)
2007–2008	→ 1461 Trabzon (loan)	19	(4)
2008–2010	1461 Trabzon	?	(?)
2010–2011	Tavşanlı Linyitspor	3	(0)
2011	İskenderunspor	6	(0)
2011–2013	Nazilli Belediyespor	21	(4)
2013	Trabzon Kanuni	14	(6)
2013–2014	Arsinspor	23	(8)
2014–2015	Diyarbekirspor	4	(0)
2015–2016	Üsküdar Anadolu	33	(5)
2016	Ayvalıkgücü Belediyespor	7	(5)
2016–	Araklıspor	10	(0)

International career
2008	Turkey U-18	4	(0)
- * Club domestic league appearances and goals as of 28 December 2016 (UTC)

Emre Kahraman (born 23 June 1987 in Trabzon) is a Turkish football player who currently plays for Araklıspor.

== Career ==
The midfielder played previously for Trabzonspor, 1461 Trabzon, Linyit Spor and IDCspor.
