= Qarali, Iran =

Qarali قرالي
- Village
- Location within Iran
- Coordinates: 36°29′00″N 46°00′19″E
- Country: Iran
- Province: West Azerbaijan
- County: Bukan
- Bakhsh: Central
- Rural District: Il Teymur

Population (2006)
  - Total: 192
- Time zone: UTC+3:30 (IRST)
  - Summer (DST): UTC+4:30 (IRDT)

Qarali (Persian: قرالي, also Romanized as Qarālī; also known as Gharali) is a village in Il Teymur Rural District, in the Central District of Bukan County, West Azerbaijan Province, Iran. At the 2006 census, its population was 192, in 35 families.
