= Aşağı Qaramanlı =

Ashaghy Garamanly
- Municipality
- Azerbaijani: Aşağı Qaramanlı
- Location within Azerbaijan
- Coordinates: 39°26′30″N 49°01′31″E
- Country: Azerbaijan
- District: Neftchala

Population
  - Total: 1,810
- Time zone: UTC+4 (AZT)
  - Summer (DST): UTC+5 (AZT)

Aşağı Qaramanlı (also, Ashaghy Garamanly, and Garamanly) is a village and municipality in the Neftchala District of Azerbaijan. It has a population of 1,810.
