= İkinci Qaralı =

Ikinji Garaly
- Azerbaijani: İkinci Qaralı
- Location within Azerbaijan
- Coordinates: 39°27′16″N 49°01′57″E
- Country: Azerbaijan
- District: Neftchala
- Municipality: Yukhary Garamanly
- Time zone: UTC+4 (AZT)
  - Summer (DST): UTC+5 (AZT)

İkinci Qaralı (also, Ikinji Garaly) is a village in the Neftchala District of Azerbaijan. The village forms part of the municipality of Yukhary Garamanly.
