= Yuxarı Qaramanlı =

Yukhary Garamanly
- Municipality
- Azerbaijani: Yuxarı Qaramanlı
- Location within Azerbaijan
- Coordinates: 39°26′15″N 49°02′32″E
- Country: Azerbaijan
- District: Neftchala

Population
  - Total: 2,737
- Time zone: UTC+4 (AZT)
  - Summer (DST): UTC+5 (AZT)

Yuxarı Qaramanlı (also, Yukhary Garamanly) is a village and municipality in the Neftchala District of Azerbaijan. It has a population of 2,737. The municipality consists of the villages of Yukhary Garamanly, Ikinji Garaly, and Pirappa.
