= Peisander (mythology) =

Greek mythological figures

In Greek mythology, Peisander or Pisander (/paɪˈsændər, ˈpaɪˌsændər/; Ancient Greek: Πείσανδρος, romanized: Peisandros, lit. 'persuader of men' or 'ruler by persuasion') may refer to the following characters:

- Pisander, also called Isander, a Lycian prince as son of Bellerophon and Philonoe, daughter of King Iobates. In some accounts, his mother was known as Alkimedousa, Anticleia, Pasandra or Cassandra. Pisander's siblings were Hippolochus (father of Glaucus) and Laodamia (also called Deidamia or Hippodamia, mother of Sarpedon by Zeus). He was slain by Ares, as he fought against the Solymi, a Lycian tribe.
- Pisander, an Achaean soldier commanded a company of Myrmidons. He was the son of Maemalus.
- Pisander, a Trojan warrior and son of Antimachus. He was the brother of Hippolochus, Hippomachus, and Tisiphone. During the Trojan War, Pisander and Hippolochus asked Agamemnon for mercy and to be taken prisoner alive, saying that their rich father would pay a ransom for him. They were nevertheless slain by Agamemnon.
- Pisander, another Trojan soldier who was killed by Menelaus.
- Pisander, a native of Abydos in Troad and the father of Maenalus, a Trojan warrior.
- Pisander, son of Polyctor and one of the suitors of Penelope from Same along with other 22 wooers. He was slain by Philoetius during the assault of Odysseus.
- Pisander, in Plutarch's Life of Aristides, one of the seven heroes to whom the Athenians, according to an oracle, had to sacrifice if they wanted to overcome their foes in the imminent battle. The other six were Androcrates, Leucon, Damocrates, Hypsion, Actaeon and Polyeidus.

== See also ==
- Jovian asteroid 248183 Peisandros, named after the Trojan warrior killed by Agamemnon
