= Isander =

Son of Bellerophon in Greek mythology

In Greek mythology, Isander or Isandrus (Ancient Greek: Ἴσανδρος, romanized: Ísandros, lit. 'equal to man') or Peisander was a Lycian prince and the son of King Bellerophon.

== Family ==
Isander's mother was Philonoe, daughter of the King Iobates. In some accounts, she was also known as Alkimedousa, Anticleia, Pasandra or Cassandra. Isander's siblings were Hippolochus (father of Glaucus) and Laodamia (also called Deidamia or Hippodamia, mother of Sarpedon by Zeus).

== Mythology ==
Isander was slain by Ares, as he fought against the "glorious" Solymi, a Lycian tribe. His misfortune was said to be in compensation of the previous victories of his father Bellerophon.
