= Mythic Warriors =

- Also known as: Mythic Warriors: Guardians of the Legend
- Based on: Myth Men Guardians of the Legend by: Laura Geringer; Peter Bollinger
- Directed by: Jim Craig
- Voices of: See § Cast
- Narrated by: James Blendick
- Composer: Varouje
- Countries of origin: Canada; France; China
- Original language: English
- No. of seasons: 2
- No. of episodes: 26 (list of episodes)

Production
- Executive producers: Michael Hirsh; Patrick Loubert; Clive A. Smith; Laura Geringer; Pascal Breton; Olivier Bremond; James Wang; Kathy Slevin; Elizabeth Partyka (S1)
- Editor: Kerri Locke
- Running time: 22 minutes
- Production companies: Nelvana Limited; Marathon Productions; Hong Guang Animation (Su Zhou) Co. Ltd. Scholastic Inc. CBS Productions (S1)

Original release
- Network: CBS (United States); France 3 (France)
- Release: November 7, 1998 – January 22, 2000

Mythic Warriors (also known as Mythic Warriors: Guardians of the Legend) is a 1998–2000 anthology animated television series, which featured retellings of popular Greek myths that were altered so as to be appropriate for younger audiences, co-produced by Nelvana Limited and Marathon Productions. Two seasons of episodes were produced on February 8, 1998, and March 14, 1999; then aired as reruns until September 9, 2000, when CBS' abolition of its Nelvana-produced children's programming in favor of Nick Jr. and later, Nickelodeon content resulted in its cancellation. The series was based on the book series Myth Men Guardians of the Legend written in 1996 and 1997 by Laura Geringer and illustrated by Peter Bollinger.

The series was a fixture of CBS' Saturday-morning cartoon lineup. Scottish Television screened the series as part of its children programme Inside Out. The show was repeat in 2009 on wknd@stv, which is a children's television strand on Scottish television channel, then on Saturday mornings on STV during 2010. The series has been translated into Scottish Gaelic and is broadcast on BBC Alba since 2010.

Most of the characters in the show are portrayed with their original Greek names, with a few Romanized exceptions (e.g. Hercules, Ulysses).

== Myth Men ==
Myth Men Guardians of the Legend is a book series written in 1996 and 1997 by Laura Geringer and illustrated by Peter Bollinger. It is a comic series targeted at children age 4-8 and published by Scholastic Books, Inc. It received the Children's Choice award.

The series includes both male and female mythical heroes, including Perseus, Heracles, Odysseus, Theseus, Andromeda and Atalanta. The books retell the actual myths and legends with added fantasy elements.

== Premise ==
=== Depictions of gods ===
The sun god Helios and his demigod son, Phaeton.

This show is well known for its unique depictions of the Greek gods. Most were shown as gigantic (approximately 10–12 feet tall) humanoids possessing immortality, the abilities to fly and teleport, supernatural powers of a magical nature (as opposed to cosmic), and the ability to alter their appearances at will; including reducing themselves to the size of a typical human, as well as completely altering their looks, voices, and even gender. When in their natural form, an echo would accompany their voice whenever they spoke.

Instead of classic attire resembling that of human nobility often employed during Hellenic times, the Olympians were instead depicted as wearing brightly colored clothing more typical of a warrior's formal attire, the exceptions being Hera, Demeter, and Hephaestus.

Between the first and second seasons, the depictions of several gods changed. Hades' attire was slightly altered. Persephone aged from a teenage-looking young girl to a grown goddess. The most significant changes, however, were to Aphrodite and Athena; the former shifted from a giggling pencil-thin schoolgirl-like teenager, to a conniving fully mature armor-clad lust goddess, with an entirely different voice and manner of speech as well. Athena was altered from a blonde in monotonous silver armor; to a brunette cloaked in blood-red dual-split dress with matching cape, plus golden shin guards and arm-bands in addition. Despite the complete change in depiction, her voice did remain the same.

=== Featured Gods ===
- Zeus – King of the gods, ruler of Olympus, and god of the sky, justice, thunder, and lightning. He is the father of many gods and heroes.
- Hera – Queen of the gods and goddess of the sky, marriage and childbirth.
- Hades – God of the Underworld, the Dead, wealth and burial.
- Demeter – Goddess of fertility, grain, agriculture and harvest. She is the mother of Persephone.
- Poseidon – God of the sea, horses and earthquakes. He is the father of various creatures and heroes, including Pegasus and Theseus.
- Hermes – Messenger of the gods; god of travelers, trickery, commerce, messages, international trade, wit, thieves, speed and invention. Also a psychopomp.
- Athena – Virgin goddess of wisdom, battles, crafts, battle tactics, warriors, handcrafts and reason.
- Ares – God of war, murder and bloodshed. Lover of Aphrodite.
- Apollo – God of arts (including music and poetry), prophecies, medicine, truth, youth, archery and civilization. Often identified with Helios as god of the sun. He is the twin brother of Artemis.
- Artemis – Virgin goddess of the hunt, wilderness, archery, fertility, children, childbirth and wildlife. She is the twin sister of Apollo.
- Hephaestus – The Gods' Blacksmith; god of the forge, fire, metalworking, volcanoes, arts and crafts.
- Aphrodite – Goddess of love and beauty. Sometimes said to be the most beautiful of the goddesses.
- Dionysus – God of wine, intoxication, transformation, drama, revelry and disorderly conduct.
- Helios – God and personification of the sun, associated with order, wealth, and lands to the far east and west.
- Eros – God and personification of lust and infatuation. Son of Aphrodite.
- Persephone – Goddess of Spring and Queen of the underworld. Daughter of Demeter and Zeus.

=== Gods who made cameo appearances ===
- Pan – God of shepherds and rustic music.
- Hebe – Goddess of youth, cupbearer to the gods; daughter of Zeus and Hera.
- Hecate – Goddess of crossroads and liminality, witchcraft and the underworld. Also connected to the moon, often alongside Selene/Luna and Artemis/Diana.
- Zephyrus – God of the West Wind.
- Boreas – God of the North Wind.
- Notus – God of the South Wind.
- Eurus – God of the East Wind.
- Achelous – A River God who battled Heracles/Hercules.

=== Featured Titans ===
- Alcyoneus – In this show, Alcyoneus is featured as a Titan King despite the fact that he is actually a Gigantes and not a Titan. The actual King of the Titan was Cronus who was the father of Zeus, Poseidon, Hades, Hera, Demeter, and Hestia.
- Atlas – Atlas holds up the sky.
- Epimetheus – Brother of Prometheus and the deity who brought animals into the world.
- Prometheus – Titan who defied Zeus by giving fire to mankind and was punished by being chained to a mountainside and tormented by eagles. After humanity proves its worth, Zeus forgives Prometheus and has him released at the hands of Hercules.

== Episode list ==
=== Season 1 ===
1. Andromeda: The Warrior Princess (November 7, 1998) –
2. Hercules and Iolas (November 14, 1998) –
3. Ulysses and the Journey Home (November 21, 1998) –
4. Perseus: The Search For Medusa (November 28, 1998) –
5. Jason and the Argonauts: The Search for the Golden Fleece (December 5, 1998) –
6. Persephone and the Winter Seeds (December 12, 1998) –
7. Icarus and Daedalus (December 19, 1998) –
8. Ulysses and Circe (December 26, 1998) –
9. Atalanta: The Wild Girl (January 2, 1999) –
10. Prometheus and Pandora's Box (January 9, 1999) –
11. Bellerophon and Pegasus (January 16, 1999) –
12. Theseus and the Minotaur (January 23, 1999) –
13. The Labours of Hercules (January 30, 1999) –

=== Season 2 ===
1. Psyche and Eros (September 25, 1999) –
2. Ulysses and the Trojan Horse (October 2, 1999) –
3. Ulysses and Penelope: A Kingdom Lost (October 9, 1999) –
4. Hercules and the Golden Apples (October 16, 1999) –
5. Cadmus and Europa (October 23, 1999) –
6. Jason and Medea (October 30, 1999) –
7. Damon and Pythias (November 6, 1999) –
8. Castor and Pollux (November 13, 1999) –
9. The Hounds of Actaeon (November 20, 1999) –
10. Phaeton: The Chariot of Fire (November 27, 1999) –
11. Androcles and the Lion (December 18, 1999) –
12. King Midas: The Golden Touch (January 15, 2000) –
13. Hercules and the Titans: The Last Battle (January 22, 2000) – After being denied a throne on Mount Olympus by Zeus despite Athena's vision, Hephaestus is tempted by Alcyoneus into freeing the Titans from Tartarus. Zeus and Athena work to convince Hercules to help them fight the Titans.

== Cast ==
- Denis Akiyama as Polyphemus the Cyclops, Amycus
- Emilie-Claire Barlow as Siren #2
- Lawrence Bayne as Hercules, War Spirit
- Rick Bennett as Ares (1st Time)
- Zachary Bennett as Talos
- Tyrone Benskin as Elpenor
- John Blackwood as Calais
- James Blendick as Narrator
- Stephen Boggaert as Hermes (3rd Time)
- Kristen Bone as Hope Spirit
- Natalie Brown as Atalanta (2nd Time)
- Valerie Buhagiar as Queen Telephasse
- Donald Burda as Lyceus
- George Buza as King Minos (1st Time), Gorgus
- Lally Cadeau as Athena (2nd Time)
- Sally Cahill as Medea
- Benedict Campbell as Daedalus, Perimedes, King Midas
- Cole Caplan as Iolaus's Brother
- Juan Chioran as Antonius
- Richard Clarkin as Hermes (1st Time)
- Jesse Collins as Apollo
- Vincent Corazza as Cilix
- Alyson Court as Delona
- Amos Crawley as Icarus
- Lisa Dalbello as Graeae
- Jennifer Dale as Medusa
- Tony Daniels as
- Richard Denison as Achelous
- Daniel DeSanto as Iolaus
- Philip DeWilde as Cadmus
- Francis Diakowsky as Poseidon
- Don Dickinson as King Iobates
- Catherine Disher as Aethra
- Cathal J. Dodd as Lucius
- Robin Dunne as Perseus
- Christopher Earle as Prince Meleager
- Adrian Egan as Deceit Spirit, King Agenor
- Michael Fletcher as Iphicles
- Colin Fox as King Cepheus, King Menelaus
- Edward Glen as Ictinus
- Janet-Laine Green as Hera
- Katie Griffin as Siren #4
- Nicky Guadagni as Princess Danaë
- Paul Haddad as Theseus
- Michael Hall as Actaeon
- Elizabeth Hanna as Artemis
- Terri Hawkes as Pandora
- David Hemblen as Hephaestus
- Ellen-Ray Hennessy as Graeae
- Dan Hennessey as Nessus
- Torri Higginson as Circe
- Roger Honeywell as Odysseus
- Pam Hyatt as Jealousy Spirit
- Loretta Jafelice as Despair Spirit
- Howard Jerome as Polites
- Taborah Johnson as Siren #3
- David Klar as Young Damon
- Lorne Kennedy as Philonoe, King Minos (2nd Time)
- Gary Krawford as Zeus, Eumaeus
- Wendy Lands as Aphrodite
- Caroly Larson as Andromeda, Atalanta (1st Time)
- Shannon Lawson as Queen Cassiopeia
- Ron Lea as Chiron (1st Time)
- Julie Lemieux as Penelope
- Shauna MacDonald as Lachesis
- Jonathan Malen as Young Castor and Pollux
- Judy Marshak as Graeae #3, Ecylceia
- Diego Matamoros as Antiphus
- Shiela McCarthy as Clotho
- Scott McCord as Phineus
- Dean McDermott as Phoenix
- Hamish McEwan as Prince Dionus
- Tracey Moore as Siren #1, Iolaus' Sister
- Kristina Nicoll as Helen
- Deborah Odell as Deianira
- Colin O'Meara as Cimon
- David Orth as Jason
- Stephen Ouimette as Dionysus
- Reagan Pasternak as Europa
- Ross Petty as King Pelias
- Jonathan Potts as Prometheus
- Toby Proctor as Telemachus
- Karl Pruner as Chiron (2nd Time)
- John Ralston as Paris
- James Rankin as Figgis
- Martin Roach as Lycopheus
- Wayne Robson as Eurystheus
- Susan Roman as Aspasia
- Tony Rosato as Orpheus
- Ron Rubin as Axos, Brutocus
- Tyrone Savage as Young Achilles
- Cedric Smith as King Polydectes
- Lyon Smith as Pythias
- Robert Smith as Epimetheus, Hate Spirit
- Linda Sorenson as Demeter
- Norm Spencer as Hades
- Greg Spottiswood as Bellerophon
- Kent Staines as King Aeëtes, Boreas
- Rob Stefaniuk as Phaëton
- Allen Stewart-Coates as Ares (2nd Time)
- John Stocker as Zetes, Polemius
- Joy Tanner as Cybele
- Wendy Thatcher as Athena (1st Time)
- Robert Tinkler as Androcles
- Adrian Truss as Arios
- Maria Vacratsis as Hecate, Atropos
- Chris Wiggins as Great Oracle, King Proetus
- Philip Williams as King Polydectes' Advisor
- Rod Wilson as Castor
- Maurice Dean Wint as Atlas, Alcyoneus
- Victor A. Young as King Glaucus
- Lenore Zann as Persephone
- Bob Zidel as Helios
