= Sarpedon (Trojan War hero) =

Figure in Greek mythology

Sarpedon I
- King of Lycia
- Member of the Cretan Royal Family
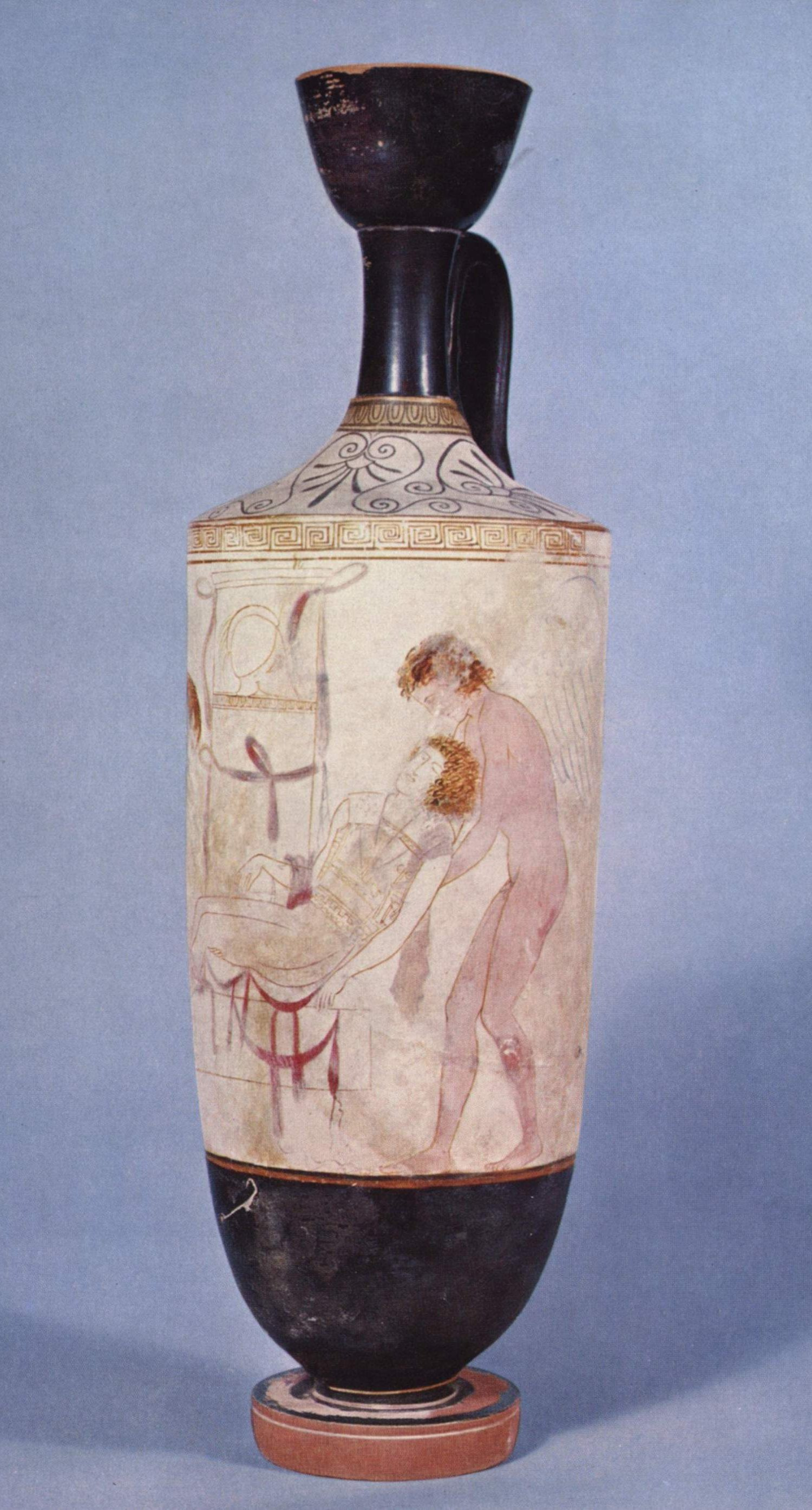
- Hypnos and Thanatos carrying the body of Sarpedon from the battlefield of Troy; detail from an Attic white-ground lekythos, ca. 440 BC.
- Successor: Evander
- Abode: Crete, later Lycia

Genealogy
- Parents: Zeus and Europa
- Siblings: Minos and Rhadamanthus
- Consort: (1) Miletus (lover) (2) ?
- Offspring: (2) Evander

In Greek mythology, Sarpedon (/sɑːrˈpiːdən/ or /sɑːrˈpiːdɒn/; Ancient Greek: Σαρπηδών, romanized: Sarpidón) was a son of Zeus, who fought on the side of Troy in the Trojan War. Although in the Iliad, he was the son of Zeus and Laodamia, the daughter of Bellerophon, in the later standard tradition, he was the son of Zeus and Europa, and the brother of Minos and Rhadamanthus, while in other accounts the Sarpedon who fought at Troy was the grandson of the Sarpedon who was the brother of Minos.

== Etymology ==
Sarpedon is believed to be a Greek rendering of Anatolian compound Sar-pedan 'one having top position'.

== Hero cult ==
There was a temple of Sarpedon in Xanthos, in Lycia, perhaps associated with a supposed burial site there. There was also a temple and oracle of Apollo Sarpedonios and Artemis Sarpedonia at Seleuceia in Cilicia. According to Tertullian there was a shrine and oracle of Sarpedon in the Troad, although Tertullian might have been confusing this for the oracle in Cilicia. There is evidence to suggest that Sarpedon was the subject of pre-Homeric non-Greek worship.

== Genealogy ==
There were three separate traditions concerning the genealogy of Sarpedon the brother of Minos, and Sarpedon the Trojan War hero.

In Homer's Iliad, Zeus had two sons by Europa, Minos and Rhadamanthus; Sarpedon, a Trojan ally from Lycia, was the son of Zeus and Laodamia, the daughter of Bellerophon and the Lycian princess Philonoe, with no apparent connection to Crete. However, in the standard classical tradition Sarpedon was instead the Cretan son of Zeus and Europa, and the brother of Minos. According to scholia to Iliad book 12, citing Hesiod and Bacchylides, Europa bore Zeus three sons on Crete, Minos, Sarpedon, and Rhadamanthus.

A fragment of the Hesiodic Catalogue of Women (preserved on a papyrus with many holes), mentions Europa's children by Zeus, and while only the name Rhadamanthus is preserved, there is sufficient room for the names Minos and Sarpedon, and the rest of the fragment appears to involve Sarpedon's exploits at Troy. A fragment of Aeschylus's Carians also has Sarpedon as the third son, after Minos and Rhadamanthus, of Zeus and Europa. In the fragment, Sarpedon is off fighting at Troy, while Europa waits anxiously for word of his fate. This same genealogy appears in the Euripidean Rhesus.

Having a Trojan War hero also be the brother of Minos involves a genealogical difficulty, since Minos lived three generations before the Trojan War. In some accounts, Zeus granted his son Sarpedon the gift of long life. Such a gift is already suggested by the Hesiodic Catalogue fragment, and Apollodorus, perhaps drawing on the Catalogue, says that Zeus allowed his (and Europa's) son Sarpedon to live for three generations. However, by other accounts, the Sarpedon who was the brother of Minos, and the Sarpedon who fought at Troy were different. Diodorus Siculus says that, according to Cretan myth, the Sarpedon who was the son of Zeus and Europa, and the brother of Minos and Rhadamanthus, had a son Euandrus who married Deïdameia, the daughter of Bellerophon, and by her was the father of the Sarpedon who fought at Troy.

In Dictys Cretensis, Sarpedon is the son of Xanthus and Laodamia, while in the Clementine Recognitions recounted that he is the son of Zeus and Hippodamia.

== Mythology ==
Sarpedon II
- Trojan War hero
- Member of the Lycian Royal Family
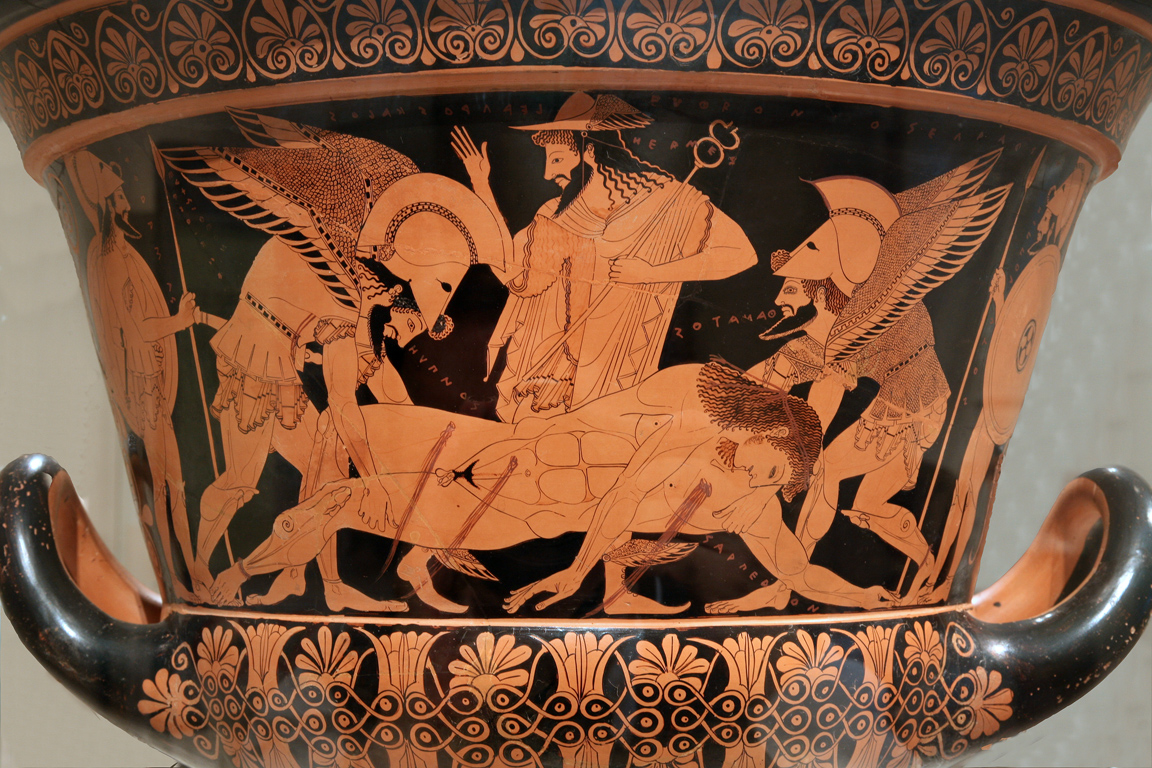
- The death of Sarpedon, depicted on the obverse of Euphronios Krater, also called the Sarpedon Krater, c. 515 BC
- Abode: Lycia

Genealogy
- Parents: (1) Zeus and Laodamia (2) Zeus and Hippodamia (3) Euandros and Deidamia (4) Xanthus and Laodamia
- Siblings: -

=== Brother of Minos ===
Sarpedon and his brothers Minos and Rhadamanthus, were adopted by the Cretan king Asterion or Asterius. According to the scholia to Iliad book 12 (mentioned above) when Zeus brought Europa to Crete, he gave her as wife to Asterion, the king of Crete, while the mythographers Diodorus Siculus and Apollodorus tells us that Europa married Asterion, who adopted her three sons Minos, Sarpedon and Rhadamanthus. When they grew up, Sarpedon and Minos fought, Minos won, and Sarpedon was forced to flee his native Crete for Asia Minor, eventually ending up in Lycia.

As Herodotus tells us, Sarpedon and Minos fought for the Cretan throne, and Minos prevailed, driving out Sarpedon and his supporters (called the Termilae), who fled to a place controlled by the Milyans (then called the Solymi), that would later be called Lycia, after Lycus, the son of Pandion II, the legendary king of Athens. However, in another version of the story reported by Apollodorus, Minos fought Sarpedon over the love of the boy Miletus (or Atymnius, the son of Zeus and Cassiopeia). Again Minos was victorious, and Sarpedon fled (along with Miletus), this time to join Europa's brother Cilix, who was at war with the Lycians. Cilix won the war, and Sarpedon became king of the Lycians. According to the fourth-century BC historian Ephorus, this Sarpedon was said to be the founder of the Carian city of Miletus (although in other accounts the boy Miletus is credited as founder).

As mentioned above, in the standard tradition, this Sarpedon was a leader of a Lycian contingent which fought alongside the Trojans in the Trojan War. Although according to Diodorus Siculus, this Sarpedon instead had a son Euandrus who was the father of the Sarpedon who fought at Troy.

=== Trojan War ===
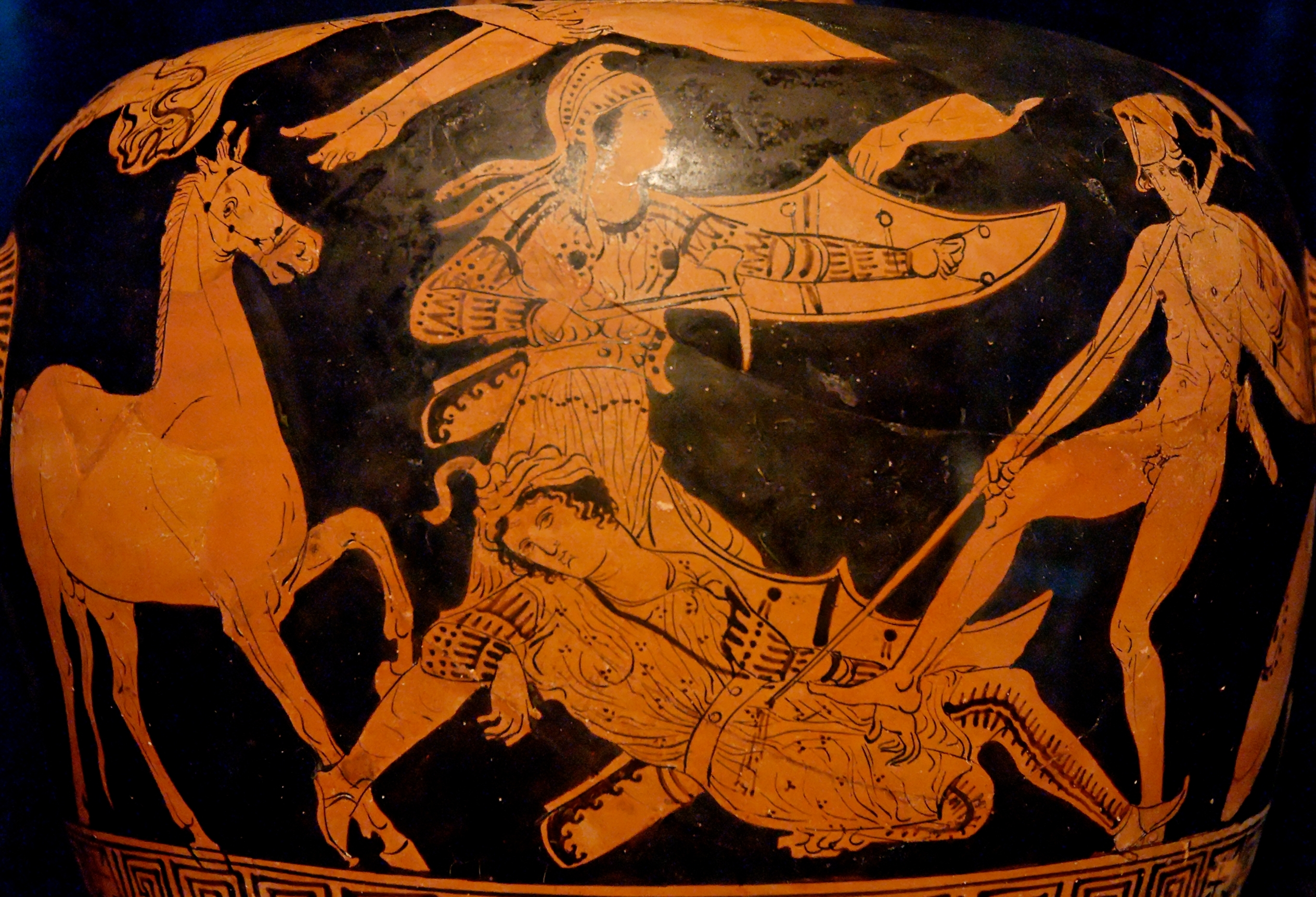
Above: Sarpedon (only his legs) being carried by Hypnos and Thanatos. Below: the Amazon queen Penthesilea being killed by Achilles. Red-figure hydria by the Policoro Painter from Heraclea, c. 400 BC

Sarpedon fought on the side of the Trojans, with his cousin Glaucus, during the Trojan War, becoming one of Troy's greatest allies and heroes.

He scolded Hector in the Iliad (Book 5, lines 471–492) claiming that he left all the hard fighting to the allies of Troy and not to the Trojans themselves, and made a point of saying that the Lycians had no reason to fight the Greeks, or no real reason to hate them, but because he was a faithful ally to Troy he would do so and fight his best anyway. When the Trojans attacked the wall newly built by the Greeks, Sarpedon led his men (who also included Glaucus and Asteropaios) to the forefront of the battle and caused Ajax and Teucer to shift their attention from Hector's attack to that of Sarpedon's forces. He personally held up the battlements and was the first to enter the Greek encampment. This attack allowed Hector to break through the Greek wall. It was during this action that Sarpedon delivered a speech about noblesse oblige to Glaucus, stating that they had been the most honoured kings, therefore they must now fight the most to repay that honour and prove themselves and repay their loyal subjects. While he was preparing to plunge into battle, he told Glaucus that together they would go on to glory: if they were successful, the glory would be their own; if not, the glory of whoever stopped them would be the greater.

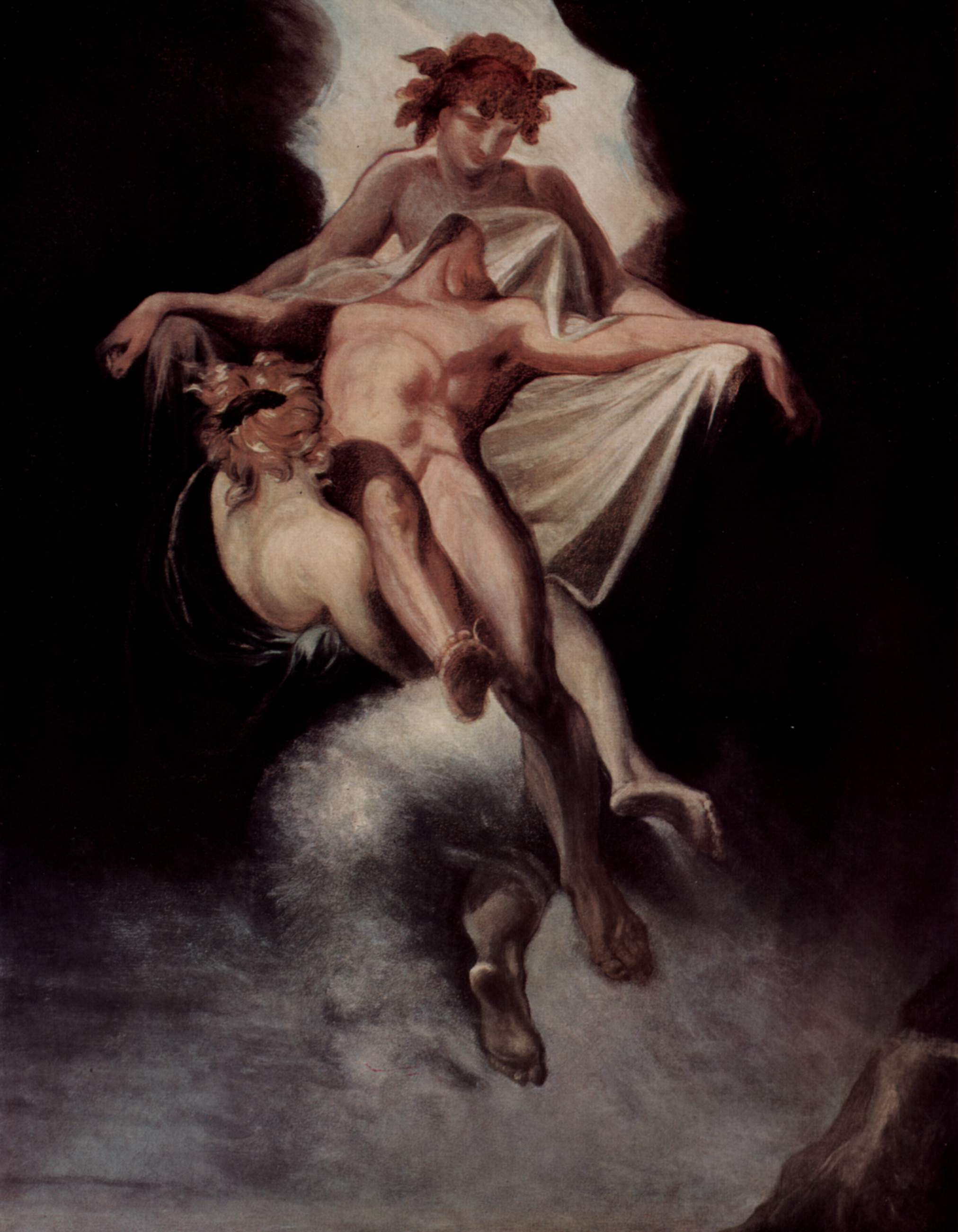
Sarpedon carried away by Sleep and Death, by Henry Fuseli, 1803.

=== Death ===
When Patroclus entered the battle in the armour of Achilles, Sarpedon met him in combat. Zeus debated with himself whether to spare his son's life even though he was fated to die by the hand of Patroclus. He would have done so had Hera not reminded him that other gods' sons were fighting and dying and other gods' sons were fated to die as well. If Zeus should spare his son from his fate, another god might do the same; therefore Zeus let Sarpedon die while fighting Patroclus, but not before Sarpedon killed the only mortal horse of Achilles. During their fight, Zeus sent a shower of bloody raindrops over the Trojans' heads expressing the grief for the impending death of his son.

When Sarpedon fell, mortally wounded, he called on Glaucus to rescue his body and arms. Patroclus withdrew the spear he had embedded in Sarpedon, and as it left Sarpedon's body his spirit went with it. A violent struggle ensued over the body of the fallen king. The Greeks succeeded in gaining his armour (which was later given as a prize in the funeral games for Patroclus), but Zeus had Phoebus Apollo rescue the corpse. Apollo took the corpse and cleaned it, then delivered it to Sleep (Hypnos) and Death (Thanatos), who took it back to Lycia for funeral honours. (See: Iliad books: II, IV, XII, XVI).

== Namesake ==
- An asteroid is named after the Trojan War hero, 2223 Sarpedon.
