= Tisiphone (mythology) =

Disambiguation page for Greek legends

In Greek mythology, Tisiphone (Ancient Greek: Τισιφόνη) may refer to various characters:

- Tisiphone, one of the Erinyes, goddesses of vengeance.
- Tisiphone, daughter of Alcmaeon, one of the Epigoni, and Manto, daughter of the seer Tiresias. She was the sister of Amphilochus. Tisiphone was given by her father to King Creon of Corinth to be brought up but was instead sold as a slave by the latter's wife, who feared her beauty; coincidentally she was bought by her father, not knowing that she was his daughter, and kept by him as a maid.
- Tisiphone, the Trojan daughter of Antimachus and wife of Meneptolemus.
