= Hippolochus (son of Bellerophon) =

Lycian prince in Greek mythology

In Greek mythology, Hippolochus (Ancient Greek: Ἱππολόχoς, romanized: Hippolokhos) was a Lycian prince as the son of King Bellerophon. He was probably the successor of the latter in the kingship of the Lycian land.

== Family ==
Hippolochus's mother was Philonoe, daughter of the King Iobates. In some accounts, she was also known as Alkimedousa, Anticleia, Pasandra or Cassandra. Hippolochus was the brother of Isander and Laodamia (Deidamia or Hippodamia), and the father or stepfather of Glaucus II (not to be confused with Glaucus I, who was the father or stepfather of Bellerophon).

== Mythology ==
Hippolochus sent his son to participate in the Trojan War and the latter became one of the distinguished Trojan Leaders.

"But Hippolochus begat me (i.e. Glaucus) and of him do I declare that I am sprung; and he sent me to Troy and straitly charged me ever to be bravest and pre-eminent above all, and not bring shame upon the race of my fathers, that were far the noblest in Ephyre and in wide Lycia."
