= Hippolochus (mythology) =

In Greek mythology, Hippolochus (Ancient Greek: Ἱππολόχoς Hippolokhos) may refer to three distinct characters:

- Hippolochus, a Lycian prince as son of Bellerophon and father of Glaucus, one of the Trojan Leaders.
- Hippolochus, a Trojan soldier and son of Antimachus.
- Hippolochus, a Trojan son of Antenor. Together with his brothers Glaucus and Acamas, he survived the fall of Troy and, perhaps as prisoners, accompanied the Spartan King Menelaus on his return voyage home. When the fleet was shipwrecked in Egypt, Hippolochus and his brothers refused to sail further because they no longer wanted to be in the company of those who had destroyed Troy. They settled in Cyrene.
