= Peirana =

Peirana was a town of ancient Lycia, which according to Pindar was the home of Bellerophon.

Its site is unlocated.
