= Evander (mythology) =

Mythological character in Greek and Roman mythology

In Greek and Roman mythology, Evander (Ancient Greek: Εὔανδρος, romanized: Euandros) may refer to three distinct characters:

- Evander, a Lycian king who succeeded his father Sarpedon, son of Zeus and Europa, in the kingship of Lycia. He married Deidamia, daughter of Bellerophon, and had by her a son Sarpedon.
- Evander, a Trojan prince as the bastard son of King Priam of Troy by an unknown concubine. Alongside his brother Pisus, he was captured in battle by Ajax the Greater or Diomedes and sacrificed at the funeral of Patroclus by Achilles.
- Evander of Pallantium, the wisest among the Arcadians, emigrated to Italy where he founded a city Pallantium. He was the son of Hermes and Carmentis, a nymph skilled in the art of divination.
