= Meneptolemus =

In Greek mythology, Meneptolemus (Ancient Greek: Μενεπτολέμοιο or Μενεπτόλεμος means 'staunch in battle, steadfast') may refer to two different figures:

- Meneptolemus, husband of Tisiphone, daughter of Antimachus of Troy. His wife roused the other Trojan women to fight during the Trojan war.
- Meneptolemus, one of the Suitors of Penelope who came from Dulichium along with other 56 wooers. He, with the other suitors, was slain by Odysseus with the aid of Eumaeus, Philoetius, and Telemachus.
