= Bellerophon Mosaic =

2nd century Roman mosaic

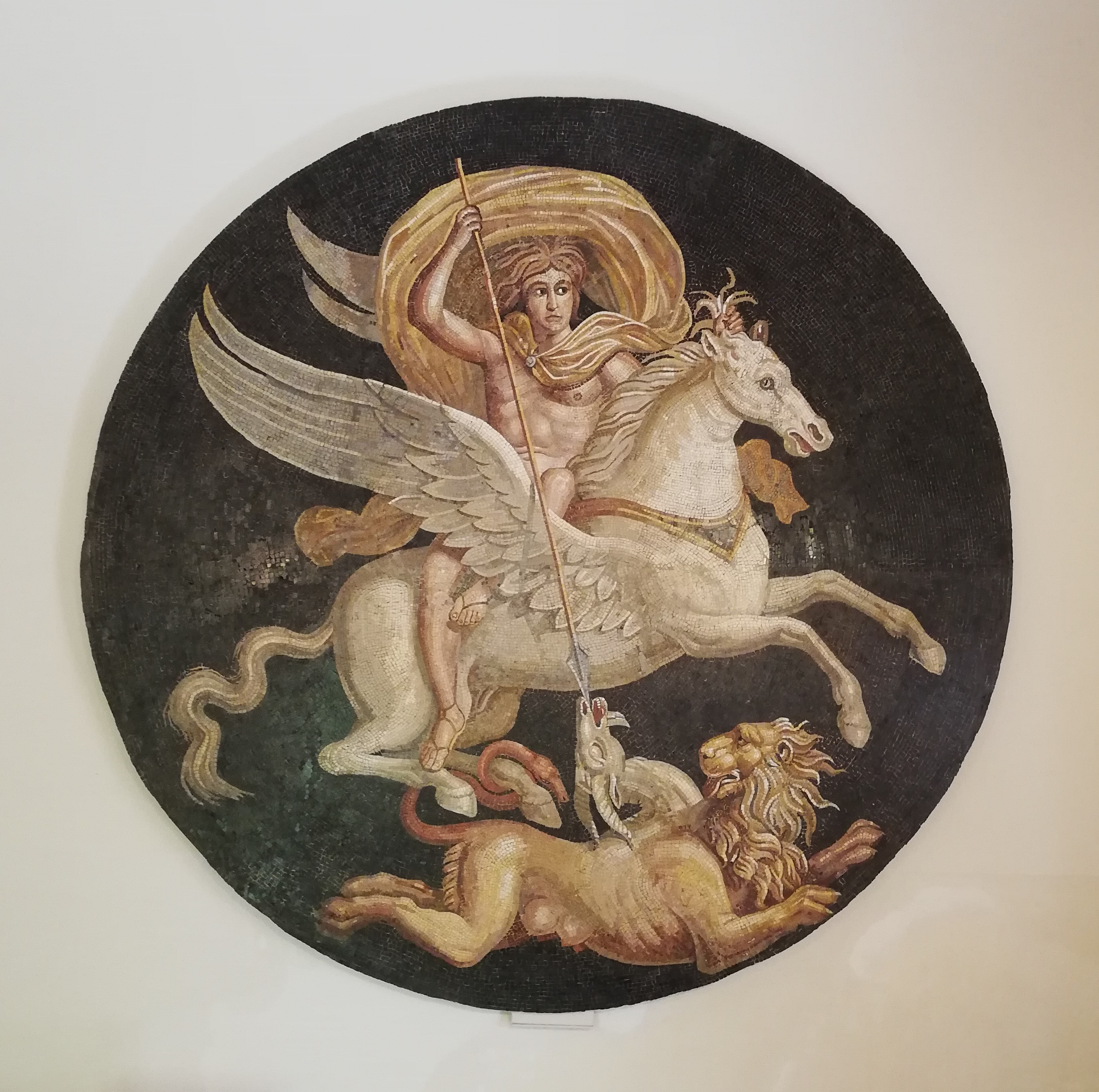
The Bellerophon Mosaic (2nd century AD)

The Bellerophon Mosaic is a 2nd century AD ancient Roman mosaic, discovered at Autun in 1830 and now in the musée Rolin. It shows Bellerophon mounted on Pegasus killing the Chimera.
