= Cassandra (mythology) =

Two homonymous Greek mythological figures

In Greek mythology, Cassandra (/kassándra/; Ancient Greek: Κασσάνδρα Kassandra, also Κασάνδρα) may refer to two women:

- Cassandra, a Trojan princess as daughter of King Priam and Hecuba.
- Cassandra, another name for Philonoe, wife of Bellerophon. Otherwise, she was also known under several other names: Alkimedousa, Anticleia, or Pasandra. By the hero, Cassandra became the mother of Isander (Peisander), Hippolochus and Laodamia.

== Mythology ==
=== Prophetic curse ===
Ancient sources recount that Apollo granted Cassandra the gift of prophecy, but after she rejected his advances, he cursed her so that her accurate predictions would never be believed. Kochenash summarizes this tradition and notes that Cassandra's curse shapes her narrative role throughout Greek literature.

=== Characterization as a seer ===
Payne highlights that Cassandra stands apart from many Greek seers, who were typically respected for their insight. Cassandra's acute awareness of impending danger, combined with the continual disbelief of those around her, has made her a distinctive literary archetype.

== Death and aftermath ==
Following the fall of Troy, ancient accounts relate that Cassandra sought refuge in the temple of Athena, believing the goddess would protect her from the invading Greek forces. Although she initially remained untouched, she was ultimately seized and taken as a war prize by Agamemnon.

=== Aeschylus's version ===
In Aeschylus's Agamemnon, Cassandra delivers a final prophetic speech in which she invokes the spirits of her murdered family, identifies herself as the “lone survivor,” and foresees her own death at the hands of Clytemnestra. Her warnings, like her earlier prophecies, remain unheeded.
