= Hippolochus (son of Antimachus) =

Son of Antimachus in Greek mythology

In Greek mythology, Hippolochus (Ancient Greek: Ἱππολόχoς Hippolokhos) was a Trojan soldier and son of Antimachus. He was the brother of Pisander, Hippomachus, and Tisiphone.

== Mythology ==
During the Trojan War, Hippolochus and his brother Pisander, sons of Antimachus—a Trojan elder who opposed returning Helen to the Greeks—encountered Agamemnon on the battlefield. Attempting to ransom themselves, they pleaded for mercy, offering that their wealthy father would pay a substantial ransom. However, Agamemnon, recalling Antimachus's prior opposition to the Greek envoys Menelaus and Odysseus, refused their plea and killed them both..

Then took he (i.e. Agamemnon) Peisander and Hippolochus, staunch in fight. Sons were they of wise-hearted Antimachus, who above all others in hope to receive gold from Paris, goodly gifts, would not suffer that Helen be given back to fair-haired Menelaus. His two sons lord Agamemnon took, the twain being in one car, and together were they seeking to drive the swift horses, for the shining reins had slipped from their hands, and the two horses were running wild; but he rushed against them like a lion, the son of Atreus, and the twain made entreaty to him from the car: “Take us alive, thou son of Atreus, and accept a worthy ransom; treasures full many he stored in the palace of Antimachus, bronze and gold and iron, wrought with toil; thereof would our father grant thee ransom past counting, should he hear that we are alive at the ships of the Achaeans.”

So with weeping the twain spake unto the king with gentle words, but all ungentle was the voice they heard: “If ye are verily the sons of wise-hearted Antimachus, who on a time in the gathering of the Trojans, when Menelaus had come on an embassage with godlike Odysseus, bade slay him then and there, neither suffer him to return to the Achaeans, now of a surety shall ye pay the price of your father's foul outrage.”

He spake, and thrust Peisander from his chariot to the ground, smiting him with his spear upon the breast, and backward was he hurled upon the earth. But Hippolochus leapt down, and him he slew upon the ground, and shearing off his arms with the sword, and striking off his head, sent him rolling, like a round stone, amid the throng. These then he let be, but where chiefly the battalions were being driven in rout, there leapt he in, and with him other well-greaved Achaeans.
