= Hippomachus =

Hippomachus or Hippomakhos or Hippomachos (Ancient Greek: Ἱππόμαχον or Ἱππόμαχος means "fighting on horseback, trooper") may refer to:

- Hippomachus, a Trojan warrior and son of Antimachus. He was the brother of Hippolochus, Pisander, and Tisiphone. During the Trojan War, Hippomachus was killed by Leonteus, leader of the Lapiths, who smote him with a cast of his spear, striking him upon the girdle.
- Hippomachus, one of the Suitors of Penelope. He came from Zacynthos along with other 43 wooers. Hippomachus was ultimately killed by Odysseus with the help of Eumaeus, Philoetius, and Telemachus, after returning from his 10-year journey.
- Hippomachus, the father of Perineike, mother of the Argonaut Iphitos and Antiphanteia by Naubolus.
- Hippomachus of Elis, an ancient Greek who won three opponents in an Olympic boxing competition for boys without receiving a blow.
