= Stheneboea =

Queen in Greek mythology

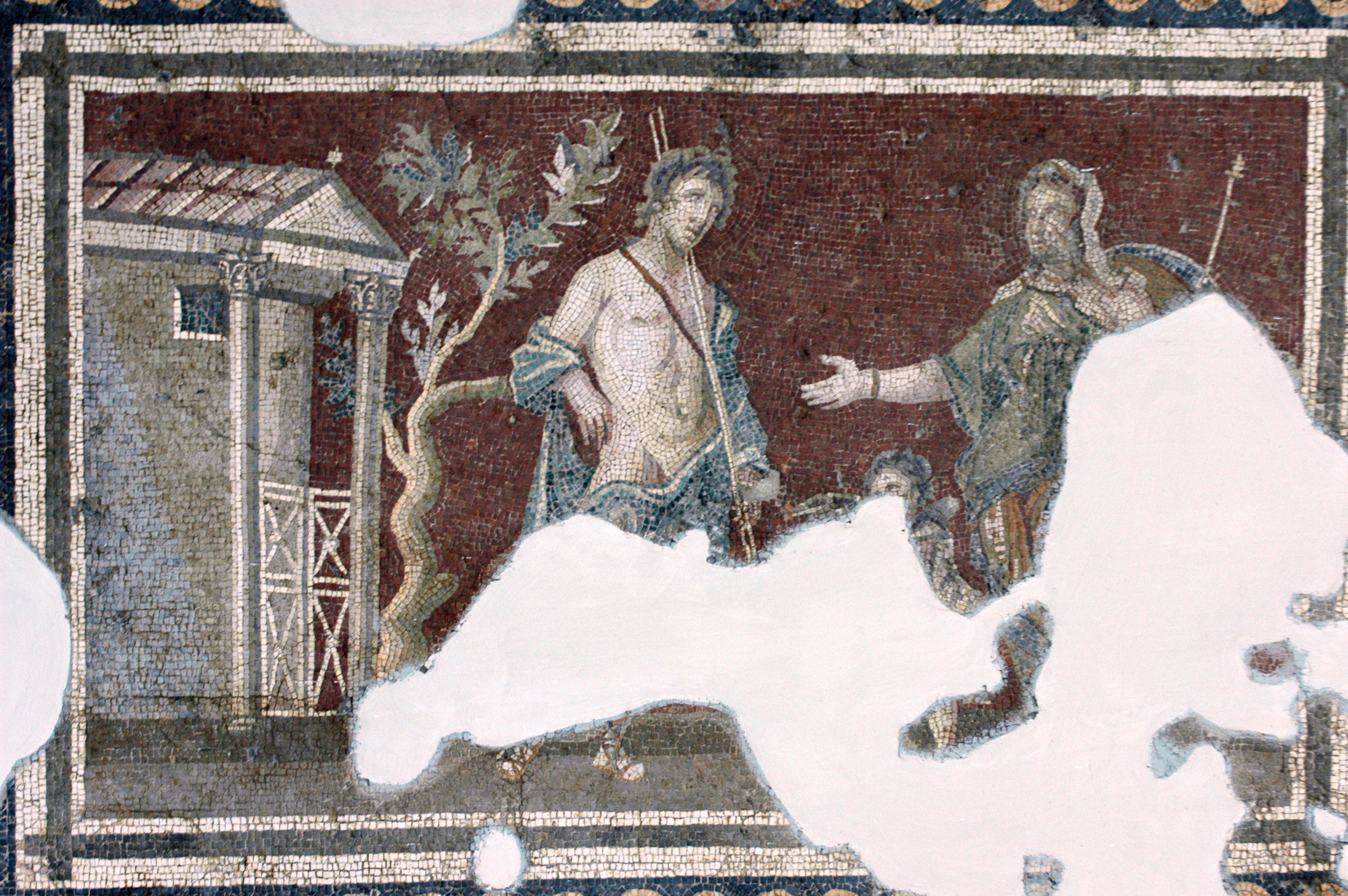
Bellerophon and Stheneboea detail from the 2nd-century Four Seasons mosaic from Antioch, Hatay Archaeological Museum.

In Greek mythology, Stheneboea (/ˌsθɛnɪˈbiːə/; Ancient Greek: Σθενέβοια, romanized: Sthenéboia, lit. 'strong cow, strong through cattle') also called Antea in Homer (Ancient Greek: Ἄντεια, romanized: Ánteia), is the daughter of Iobates, king in Lycia. She was the queen consort of Proetus, joint-king in the Argolid along with Acrisius, having his seat at Tiryns.

According to early sources, Stheneboea was the daughter of Aphidas and sister of Aleus. Stheneboea desired the hero Bellerophon, but he spurned her advances, so she accused him of rape to her husband, setting in motion the events that would result in Bellerophon becoming one of the greatest ancient Greek heroes.

== Etymology ==
Stheneboea is one of a number of female figures named for their role as "cattle queens"; they include Phereboia ("bringing in cattle"), and Polyboia ("worth much cattle"). In archaic Greece cattle were a source of wealth and a demonstration of social pre-eminence; they also signified the numinous presence of Hera.

== Family ==
An early genealogy in Hesiod's Catalogue of Women has Stheneboea as the daughter of Aleus' father Apheidas but by the time of Euripides' lost tragedy Stheneboea her father is Iobates.

By Proetus she had three daughters, Iphinoë, Iphianassa and Lysippe, collectively known as the Proetids ("daughters of Proetus").

== Mythology ==
Stheneboea or Antea was married to king Proetus, who once welcomed the hero Bellerophon in his court. Stheneboea took a strong fancy to the gallant and handsome Bellerophon but was repulsed, for Bellerophon was of noble heart. The bitterly rejected Stheneboea testified falsely against Bellerophon, accusing him of rape to her husband, and urged Proetus to kill him. Proetus could not slay a guest, so he sent him to deliver a letter to Iobates with instructions for his father-in-law to kill the messenger. Iobates, also unwilling to kill a guest, sent Bellerophon on a deadly quest to slay the monstrous Chimera, in hopes that he would perish doing so, but Bellerophon triumphed and accoplished all the additional hard tasks the king gave him, until eventually Iobates gave up.

Afterwards Iobates gave Stheneboea's sister Philonoe's hand in marriage to Bellerophon, and consequently, this resulted in Stheneboea's suicide out of despair when she heard the news. In another version, after he was done with the Chimera he returned to the king and queen and pretended to reciprocate Stheneboea's affections after all. Bellerophon took her up on Pergasus with the promise to take her away to the land of Caria, but as they were flying he threw her at the sea below near the island of Melos; fishermen found the body and returned it to Proetus.

Divine judgement was added to this tragic end, since Stheneboea's three daughters were overcome with madness, inflicted by either Hera or Dionysus, and took to ranging over the mountains as maenads, assaulting travelers.

== Parallel stories ==
Robert Graves observes that Anteia's attempted seduction of Bellerophon has several Greek parallels and draws attention to Biadice's love for Phrixus, which "recalls Potiphar's wife's love for Joseph, a companion myth from Canaan" as well as Cretheis and Peleus, Phaedra and Hippolytus or Philonome and Tenes. Graves also notes the parallel in the Egyptian Tale of the Two Brothers, from about the end of the second millennium BC. "Such poisonous triangular relationships," Jeffrey A White has observed in this context, "with negligible variations of detail and conclusion (the common ingredients being a failed seductress, an innocent youth and a deceived father-figure), can be multiplied easily from Greek myth, as from Hebrew. That the Bellerophon-Proetus-Anteia relationship recalls quite vividly the Joseph-Potiphar-Potiphar's wife episode in Gen. 39, is well known."
