= Hippodamia (mythology) =

Various Greek mythological characters

In Greek mythology, Hippodamia, Hippodamea or Hippodameia (/ˌhɪpɒdəˈmaɪ.ə/; Ancient Greek: Ἱπποδάμεια, romanized: Hippŏdămīa or Hippŏdămē) may refer to these female characters:

- Hippodamia, daughter of Oenomaus, and wife of Pelops.
- Hippodamia, wife of Pirithous and daughter of Atrax or Butes.
- Hippodamia, wife of Autonous and mother of Anthus.
- Hippodamia, daughter of Anicetus who consorted with Zeus.
- Hippodamia, name shared by two of the Danaïdes, daughters of King Danaus of Libya either by the hamadryads, Atlanteia or Phoebe. One of them married and killed her husband Istrus and the other Diocorystes. These princes were sons of King Aegyptus of Egypt and an Arabian woman. Either of these two Hippodamias became the mother of Olenus by Zeus.
- Hippodamia, also known as Laodamia or Deidamia, daughter of the hero Bellerophon and Philonoe, daughter of the Lycian king Iobates. She was said to mothered Sarpedon by the god Zeus.
- Hippodamia, also known as Alcimede or Cleobule, the mother of Phoenix by Amyntor, and possibly of Asydameia and Crantor.
- Hippodameia, wife of Alcathous (the son of Aesyetes) and daughter of Anchises with Eriopis. The Iliad records that she was cherished by her parents, excelling all other girls her age in beauty, wit and handiwork.
- Hippodamia, possible name for the mother of Guneus by Ocytus.
- Hippodamia, an Athenian maiden who was one of the would-be sacrificial victims of Minotaur.
- Hippodameia, a.k.a. Briseis, the wife of a prince in Asia Minor at the time of the Trojan War.
- Hippodameia, another name for Tisiphone, daughter of Antimachus.
