= Joseph T. Shipley =

American linguist

Joseph Twadell Shipley
- Born: August 19, 1893; Brooklyn, New York, US
- Died: May 11, 1988 (aged 94); London, United Kingdom
- Education: City College of New York; Columbia University
- Occupations: Drama critic Author, editor, and translator Professor
- Years active: 1914–1982
- Known for: Drama criticism
- Notable work: Dictionary of world literature Dictionary of World Literary Terms, Forms, Technique, Criticism; The origins of English words: A discursive dictionary of Indo-European roots
- Spouse: Shirley Shipley

Joseph Twadell Shipley (August 19, 1893 – May 11, 1988) was an American drama critic, author, editor and associate professor of English at Yeshiva College in New York City.

== Early life ==
Shipley graduated from City College in 1912. He received a Ph.D. in comparative literature from Columbia in 1931 with the thesis The quest for literature; a survey of literary criticism and the theories of the literary forms.

== Academia ==
Shipley taught English at Stuyvesant High School from 1914 to 1957, and also taught at City College and Brooklyn College. He was secretary to the president of Yeshiva college, assistant professor and then associate professor at Yeshiva college in the period 1928 to 1944 - "a member of the first faculty of Yeshiva College."

== Literature ==
Shipley became drama critic of The Call in 1918. The Call later became The New Leader and Shipley was drama critic in this paper until 1962. His theater reviews were broadcast on the radio station WEVD in New York on his program First Nights from 1940 to 1982. He was president of the New York Drama Critics’ Circle 1952-1954 and was secretary for the group for 16 years, until 1982.

He was the author or editor of 27 books. He published a book about Eugene O'Neill in 1928 and was among the first to write about O'Neill. His last book: Origins of English Words, was published in 1984 by Johns Hopkins University Press.

Shipley was an honorary overseas member of the Critics Circle in London, and was in 1977 awarded the Townsend Harris Medal by City College for his distinguished career in criticism.

== Bibliography ==
The bibliography is based on books registered with Library of Congress Online Catalog.

=== Author ===
Title	Edition	Year	Copyright year	Comment	Location: Publisher	Notes
The Art of Eugene O'Neill		1928	1928		Seattle: University of Washington Book Store	
The Art of Eugene O'Neill		1974	1928		Folcroft, Pennsylvania: Folcroft Library Editions	
The Art of Eugene O'Neill		1976	1928		Norwood, Pennsylvania: Norwood Editions	
The Art of Eugene O'Neill		1977	1928		Philadelphia: R. West	
Auguste Rodin: A Biography		1939	1939	by Victor Frisch & Joseph T. Shipley	New York: Frederick A. Stokes Co.	
Auguste Rodin: A Biography, in Spanish: La vida y el arte de Auguste Rodin		1945	1945	by Victor Frisch & Joseph T. Shipley	Buenos Aires: Editorial Poseidón	
The Crown Guide to the World's Great Plays, from Ancient Greece to Modern Times	rev., updated ed.	1984	1984	rev. ed. of Guide to Great Plays, 1956.	New York: Crown Publishers	
Dictionary of Early English		1955	1955	with a pref. by Mark Van Doren	New York: Philosophical Library	
Dictionary of Word Origins		1945	1945		New York: Philosophical Library	
Dictionary of Word Origins	2nd ed.	1945	1945		New York: Philosophical Library	
Dictionary of Word Origins	2nd ed.	1969	1945		New York: Greenwood Press	
Guide to Great Plays		1956	1956		Washington, DC: Public Affairs Press	
In Praise of English: The Growth & Use of Language		1977	1977		New York: Times Books	
King John		1925	1925		New York: Greenberg	
The Iiterary Isms		1931	1931		Seattle: University of Washington Book Store	
The Literary Isms		1978	1931		Norwood, Pennsylvania: Norwood Editions	
The Literary Isms		1977	1977		Folcroft, Pennsylvania: Folcroft Library Editions	
The Mentally Disturbed Teacher		1961	1961		Philadelphia: Chilton Co.	
The Origins of English Words: A Discursive Dictionary of Indo-European Roots		1984	1984		Baltimore: Johns Hopkins University Press	
Playing with Words		1960	1960		Englewood Cliffs, New Jersey: Prentice-Hall	
The Quest for literature: A Survey of Literary Criticism and the Theories of the Literary Forms		1931	1931		New York: R. R. Smith, Inc.	
Trends in Literature		1949	1949		New York: Philosophical Library	
Word Games for Play and Power		1962	1962		Englewood Cliffs, New Jersey: Prentice-Hall	
Word Play		1972	1972		New York: Hawthorn Books	

=== Editor, translator and introductions ===
Title	Edition	Dates	Copyright years	Comment	Publisher	Notes
Albert Adès's A Naked King		1924	1924	translator, from French	New York: A. & C. Boni	
The American Bookman	vol. 1, nos. 1–2	Winter 1943/44– Fall 1944	1943-44	"a quarterly of criticism and theory of the public arts"; edited by Shipley and others	New York: Philosophical Library	
Dictionary of World Literature: Criticism, Forms, Technique		1943	1943	editor	New York: Philosophical Library	
Dictionary of World Literature: Criticism, Forms, Technique	new rev. ed.	1953	1953	editor, with the collaboration of 250 scholars and other authorities	New York: Philosophical Library	
Dictionary of World Literary Terms, Forms, Technique, Criticism	completely rev. & enl. ed.	1970	1970	editor	Boston: Writer	
Encyclopedia of Literature		1946	1946	editor	New York: Philosophical Library	
Modern French Poetry: An Anthology		1926	1926	compiler & translator	New York: Greenberg	
Modern French Poetry: An Anthology		1972	1926	compiler & translator	Plainview, New York: Books for Libraries Press	
Paul Éluard's Pablo Picasso (À Pablo Picasso)		1947	1947	translator, from French	New York: Philosophical Library	
Ralph Cheyney's Touch and Go		1926	1926	introduction by Shipley	New York: H. Harrison	
Roy Mitchell's The School-theatre: A Handbook of Theory and Practice		1925	1925	introduction by Shipley	New York: Brentano's	

== Legacy ==
Beyond his accomplishments in authoring, editing and translating 27 books, and his legacy at Yeshiva College, the New York Times obituary wrote about leaving behind his wife, sister and children, along with 19 grandchildren and 9 great-grandchldren.
