= Deidamia (mythology) =

Set of mythological Greek characters

In Greek mythology, Deidamia or Deidameia (/ˌdeɪdəˈmaɪə/; Ancient Greek: Δηϊδάμεια, romanized: Deïdameia, lit. 'unconquerable', 'unsubdued' or 'she who subdues', pronounced [ði.iˈða.mi.a]) was the name referring to the following women:

- Deidamia, a Messenian princess as the daughter of King Perieres and the mother of Iphiclus, Althaea and Leda by King Thestius of Pleuron.
- Deidamia, a princess and daughter of King Lycomedes. She was the lover of Achilles and by him the mother of Neoptolemus.
- Deidamia, a Lycian princess as the daughter of the hero Bellerophon and Philonoe, daughter of the Lycian king, Iobates. She married King Evander of Lycia, son of the elder Sarpedon (son of Zeus and Europa), and had by him a son, the younger Sarpedon. Under the name of Hippodamia or Laodamia she also is said to have coupled with either Zeus or Xanthus to bear Sarpedon.
- Deidamia, other name of Hippodamia, the bride of Pirithous who was abducted by the Centaurs.
