= Philonoe =

Set of Greek mythological women

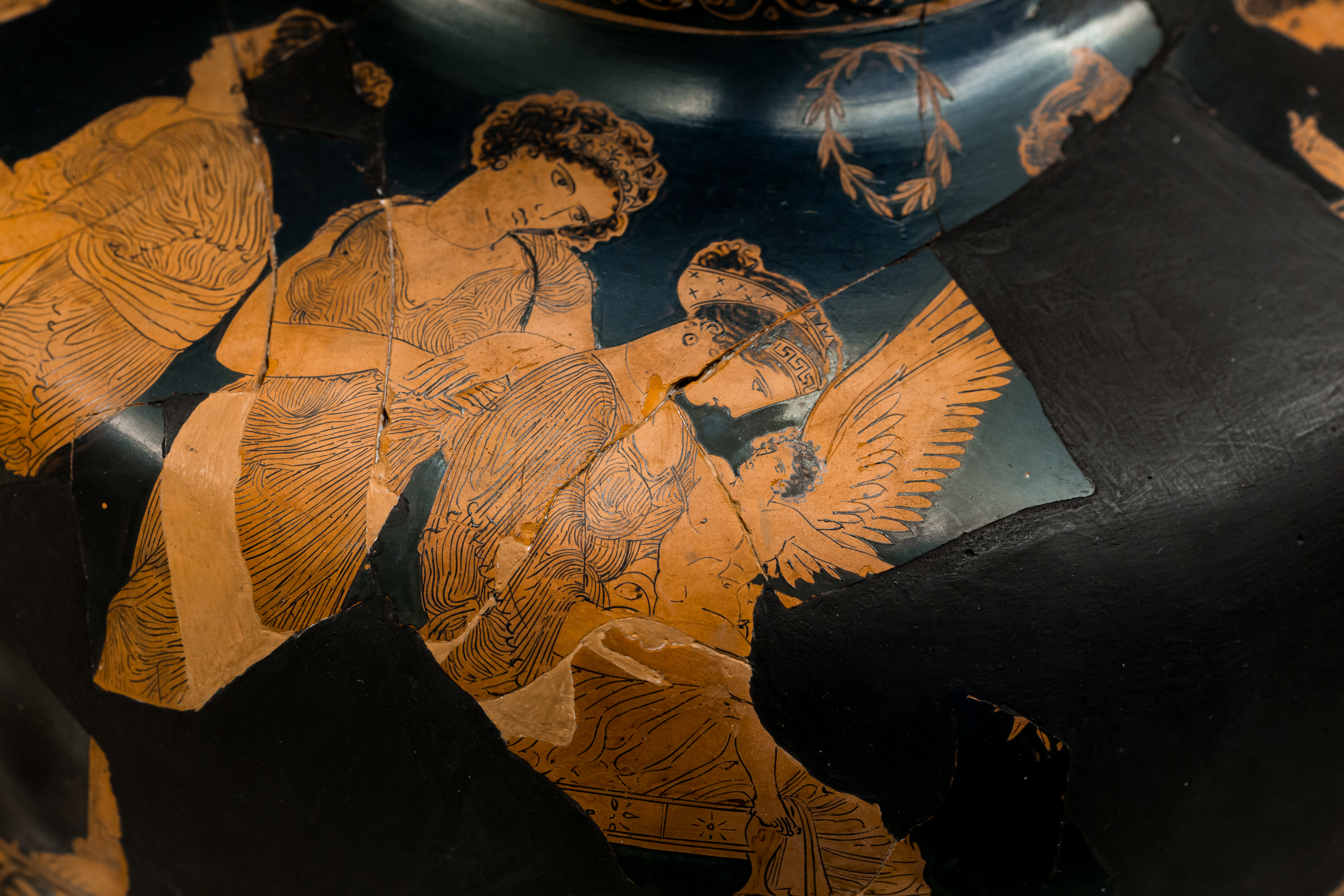
Philonoe leaning on Helen's shoulder from a red-figure Attic hydria, c. 430-420 BC by the Meidias Painter, Kerameikos Archaeological Museum.

In Greek mythology, there were two women known as Philonoe (/fɪˈloʊnoʊˌiː/; Ancient Greek: Φιλονόη, lit. 'mind of the people' or 'loving intellect') or Phylonoe (Φυλονόη):

- Philonoe, a Spartan princess as the daughter of King Tyndareus and Leda, daughter of King Thestius of Pleuron. She was the sister of Castor and Pollux, Helen, Clytemnestra, Timandra and Phoebe. The Ehoiai records that she contended in beauty with the immortal goddesses. Artemis made her immortal.
- Philonoe, daughter of Iobates and first wife of Bellerophon by whom, she became the mother of Isander (Peisander), Hippolochus and Laodamia (Deidamia or Hippodamia). Philonoe was the sister of Stheneboea who loved Bellerophon more than her current husband, King Proetus of Argos. She was promised to Bellerophon after he vanquished the Chimera, the Amazons, and more tasks. Bellerophon was given half the kingdom as well as Philonoe's hand in marriage. She was also known under several other names: Alcimedusa or Cassandra, Anticleia, or Pasandra.
