= Tisiphone (daughter of Antimachus) =

Daughter of Antimachus in Greek mythology

In Greek mythology, Tisiphone (Ancient Greek: Τισιφόνη) was the Trojan daughter of Antimachus and sister of Hippolochus, Pisander, and Hippomachus. She was the wife of Meneptolemus. In newer editions, her name has alternatively been translated as Hippodameia, and her husband's name as Tisiphonus, son of Priam.

== Mythology ==
Inspired by the battle prowess of the Amazon queen Penthesilea, Tisiphone encouraged the other Trojan women to fight during the siege of Troy. All of them should be perished from the skirmish but with the wise counsel of Theano were saved.

From Troy afar the women marvelling gazed at the Maid's (i.e. Penthesilea) battle-prowess. Suddenly a fiery passion for the fray hath seized Antimachus' daughter, Meneptolemus' wife, Tisiphone. Her heart waxed strong, and filled with lust of fight she cried to her fellows all, with desperate-daring words, to spur them on to woeful war, by recklessness made strong. "Friends, let a heart of valour in our breasts awake! Let us be like our lords, who fight with foes for fatherland, for babes, for us, and never pause for breath in that stern strife! Let us too throne war's spirit in our hearts! Let us too face the fight which favoureth none! For we, we women, be not creatures cast in diverse mould from men: to us is given such energy of life as stirs in them. Eyes have we like to theirs, and limbs: throughout fashioned we are alike: one common light we look on, and one common air we breathe: with like food are we nourished -- nay, wherein have we been dowered of God more niggardly than men? Then let us shrink not from the fray see ye not yonder a woman far excelling men in the grapple of fight? Yet is her blood nowise akin to ours, nor fighteth she for her own city. For an alien king she warreth of her own heart's prompting, fears the face of no man; for her soul is thrilled with valour and with spirit invincible. But we -- to right, to left, lie woes on woes about our feet: this mourns beloved sons, and that a husband who for hearth and home hath died; some wail for fathers now no more; some grieve for brethren and for kinsmen lost. Not one but hath some share in sorrow's cup. Behind all this a fearful shadow looms, the day of bondage! Therefore flinch not ye from war, O sorrow-laden! Better far to die in battle now, than afterwards hence to be haled into captivity to alien folk, we and our little ones, in the stern grip of fate leaving behind a burning city, and our husbands' graves."

So cried she, and with passion for stern war thrilled all those women; with eager speed they hasted to go forth without the wall mail-clad, afire to battle for their town and people: all their spirit was aflame. As when within a hive, when winter-tide is over and gone, loud hum the swarming bees what time they make them ready forth to fare to bright flower-pastures, and no more endure to linger there within, but each to other crieth the challenge-cry to sally forth; even so bestirred themselves the women of Troy, and kindled each her sister to the fray. The weaving-wool, the distaff far they flung, and the grim weapons stretched their eager hands.

And now without the city these had died in that wild battle, as their husbands died. The strong Amazons died, had not one voice of wisdom cried to stay their maddened feet, when with dissuading words Theano spake: "Wherefore, ah wherefore for the toil and strain of battle's fearful tumult do ye yearn, infatuate ones? Never your limbs have toiled in conflict yet. In utter ignorance panting for labour unendurable, ye rush on all-unthinking; for your strength can never be as that of Danaan men, men trained in daily battle. Amazons have joyed in ruthless fight, in charging steeds, from the beginning: all the toil of men do they endure; and therefore evermore the spirit of the War-god thrills them through. They fall not short of men in anything: their labour-hardened frames make great their hearts for all achievement: never faint their knees nor tremble. Rumour speaks their queen to be a daughter of the mighty Lord of War. Therefore no woman may compare with her in prowess -- if she be a woman, not a God come down in answer to our prayers. Yea, of one blood be all the race of men, yet unto diverse labours still they turn; and that for each is evermore the best whereto he bringeth skill of use and wont. Therefore do ye from tumult of the fray hold you aloof, and in your women's bowers before the loom still pace ye to and fro; and war shall be the business of our lords. Lo, of fair issue is there hope: we see the Achaeans falling fast: we see the might of our men waxing ever: fear is none of evil issue now: the pitiless foe beleaguer not the town: no desperate need there is that women should go forth to war."

So cried she, and they hearkened to the words of her who had garnered wisdom from the years; so from afar they watched the fight.
