= Glaucus (son of Hippolochus) =

Greek mythical character

- Captain of the Lycian contingent
- Member of the Trojan Leaders
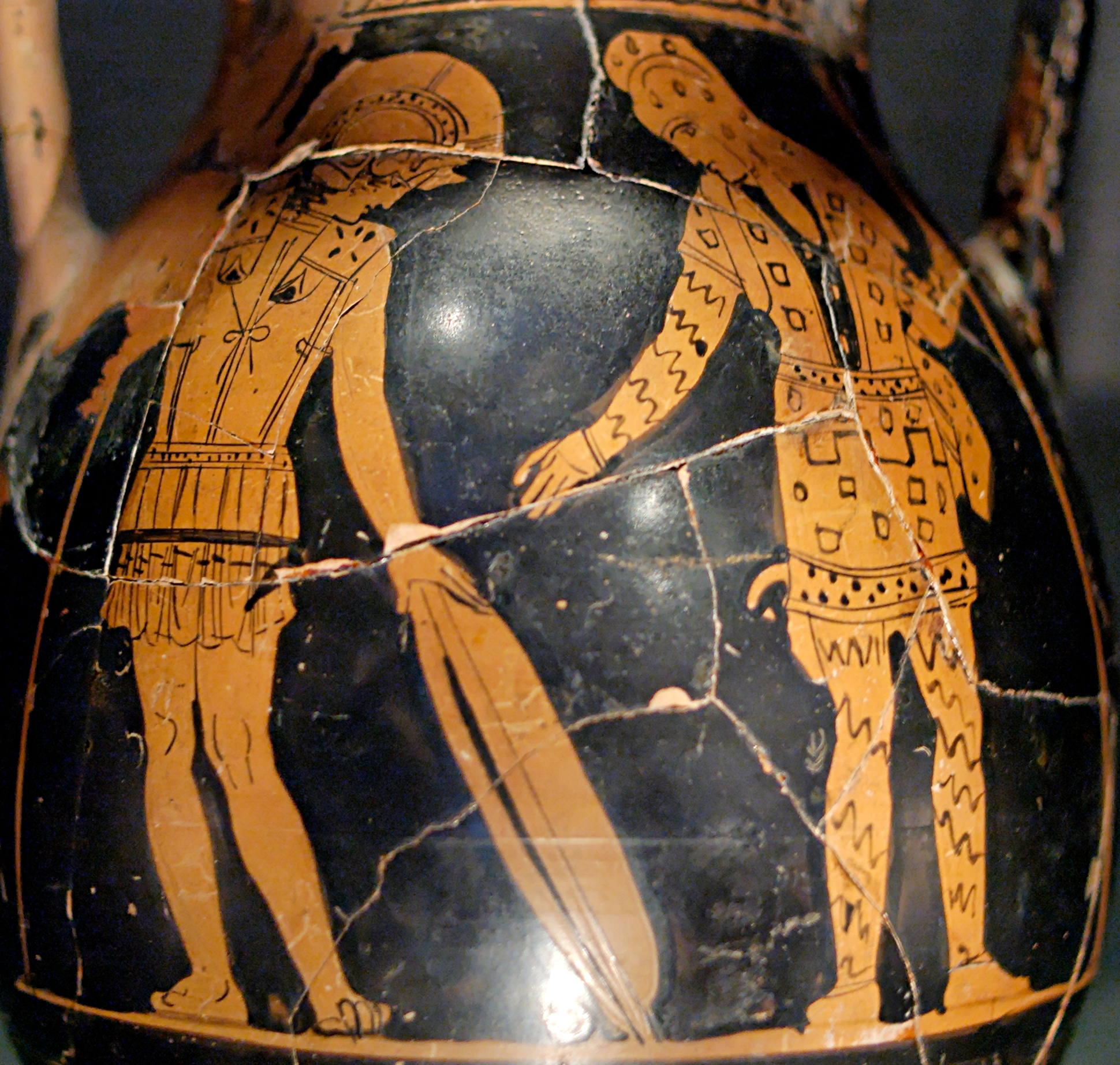
- Glaucos and Diomedes Exchange Armour
- Abode: Lycia

Genealogy
- Parents: Hippolochus
- Siblings: -

In Greek mythology, Glaucus (/ˈɡlɔːkəs/; Ancient Greek: Γλαῦκος, romanized: Glaûkos, lit. 'shiny', 'bright' or 'glimmering') was a captain in the Lycian army under the command of his close friend and cousin Sarpedon. The Lycians in the Trojan War were allies of Troy. During the war, Glaucus fought valiantly. He was described by the chronicler Malalas in his account of the Chronography as "strong, sensible, pious".

== Family ==
Glaucus was a son of Hippolokhos and a grandson of the hero Bellerophon.

== Mythology ==
In the Iliad, he met Diomedes in the field of battle in face to face combat. In response to Diomedes' challenge to him, Glaucus said that as a grandson of Bellerophon, he would fight anybody. Upon learning of Glaucus' ancestry, Diomedes planted his spear in the ground and told of how his grandfather Oeneus was a close friend of Bellerophon, and declared that the two of them despite being on opposing sides should continue the friendship. As a sign of friendship, Diomedes took off his bronze armor worth nine oxen and gave it to Glaucus. The latter then had his wits taken by Zeus and gave Diomedes his golden armor, said to be worth 100 oxen.

Glaucus was in the division of Sarpedon and Asteropaios when the Trojans assaulted the Greek wall. Their division fought valiantly, allowing Hector to break through the wall. During this assault, Teucer shot Glaucus with an arrow, wounding him and forcing him to withdraw from combat. Later, upon seeing Sarpedon mortally wounded, Glaucus prayed to Apollo, asking him to help him to rescue the body of his dying friend. Apollo cured his wound, allowing Glaucus to rally the Trojans around the body of Sarpedon until the gods carried the body away. Later in the war, when the fighting over Achilles' corpse took place, Glaucus was killed by Ajax. His body, however, was rescued by Aeneas and was then taken by Apollo to Lycia for funeral rites.

Nor did the hapless Trojans leave unwept the warrior-king Hippolochus' hero-son, but laid, in front of the Dardanian gate, upon the pyre that captain war-renowned. But him Apollo's self caught swiftly up out of the blazing fire, and to the winds gave him, to bear away to Lycia-land; and fast and far they bare him, 'neath the glens of high Telandrus, to a lovely glade; and for a monument above his grave upheaved a granite rock. The Nymphs therefrom made gush the hallowed water of a stream for ever flowing, which the tribes of men still call fair-fleeting Glaucus. This the gods wrought for an honour to the Lycian king.
