= Alcimedusa =

Princess in Greek mythology

In Greek mythology, Alcimedusa (Ancient Greek: Αλκιμέδουσα, romanized: Alkimédousa) was the Lycian princess who became the wife of the hero Bellerophon and the mother of his children. She was commonly called Philonoe or else named Anticlea, Cassandra or Pasandra.
