= Antimachus (mythology) =

Antimachus (Ancient Greek: Ἀντίμαχος, romanized: Antímakhos, derived from ἀντί anti and μάχη makhe: "against battle") may refer to these persons in Greek mythology:

- Antimachus, the son of Hippodamas, son of the river Achelous and Aeolid Perimede.
- Antimachus, one of the sons of Aegyptus. He married the Danaid Mideia who murdered him on their wedding night.
- Antimachus, a Centaur. He attended the wedding of Pirithous and was slain by Caeneus.
- Antimachus, son of Pyles and brother of Cyathus who as a cupbearer was accidentally killed by Heracles.
- Antimachus, the Thespian son of Heracles and Nicippe, daughter of King Thespius of Thespiae. Antimachus and his 49 half-brothers were born of Thespius's daughters who were impregnated by Heracles in one night, for a week or in the course of 50 days while hunting for the Cithaeronian lion. Later on, the hero sent a message to Thespius to keep seven of these sons and send three of them in Thebes while the remaining forty, joined by Iolaus, were dispatched to the island of Sardinia to found a colony.
- Antimachus, one of the Heraclides. He was the son of Thrasyanor and father of Deiphontes.
- Antimachus, a Cretan warrior who came with Idomeneus to fight on the Greeks side in the Trojan War. He was one of the warriors hidden in the Trojan Horse. He was killed by Aeneas.
- Antimachus, the Trojan father of Pisander, Hippolochus, Hippomachus, and Tisiphone. Bribed by Paris, he was against returning Helen to the Greeks, and advocated for the deaths of the Greek envoys, Menelaus and Odysseus. Because of this, when his sons Pisander and Hippolochus were captured in battle by Agamemnon, they were denied ransom and executed. According to Dictys Cretensis, his sons were later sent to retrieve Helenus, a son of Priam who had left Troy. On their way back, the sons of Antimachus were captured by Diomedes and Ajax the Greater, and stoned to death. He was later exiled by the Trojans as part of peace negotiations with the Greeks.
- Antimachus, one of the Suitors of Penelope who came from Dulichium along with either 56 other wooers (according to Apollodorus), or 51 (according to Homer). He, with the other suitors, was shot dead by Odysseus with the assistance of Eumaeus, Philoetius, and Telemachus.
- Antimachus, an Athenian youth and one of the sacrificial victims of the Minotaur.
