= Sarpedon =

Various figures in Greek mythology

Sarpedon (Ancient Greek: Σαρπηδών, romanized: Sarpidónas, pronounced [sar.pɛː.dɔ̌ːn] ) is the name of several figures in Greek mythology

- Sarpedon, a son of Zeus, who fought on the side of Troy in the Trojan War. Although in the Iliad, he was the son of Zeus and Laodamia, the daughter of Bellerophon, in the later standard tradition, he was the son of Zeus and Europa, and the brother of Minos and Rhadamanthus, while in other accounts the Sarpedon who fought at Troy was the grandson of the Sarpedon who was the brother of Minos.
- Sarpedon, a Thracian son of Poseidon, eponym of Cape Sarpedon near the outlet of the River Hebrus, and brother to Poltys, King of Aenus. Unlike the other two Sarpedons, this Thracian Sarpedon was not a hero, but an insolent individual who was shot to death by Heracles as the latter was sailing away from Aenus.
