= Bellerophon =

Ancient Greek hero

- Slayer of the Chimera; Tamer of Pegasus
- Member of the Corinthian Royal Family
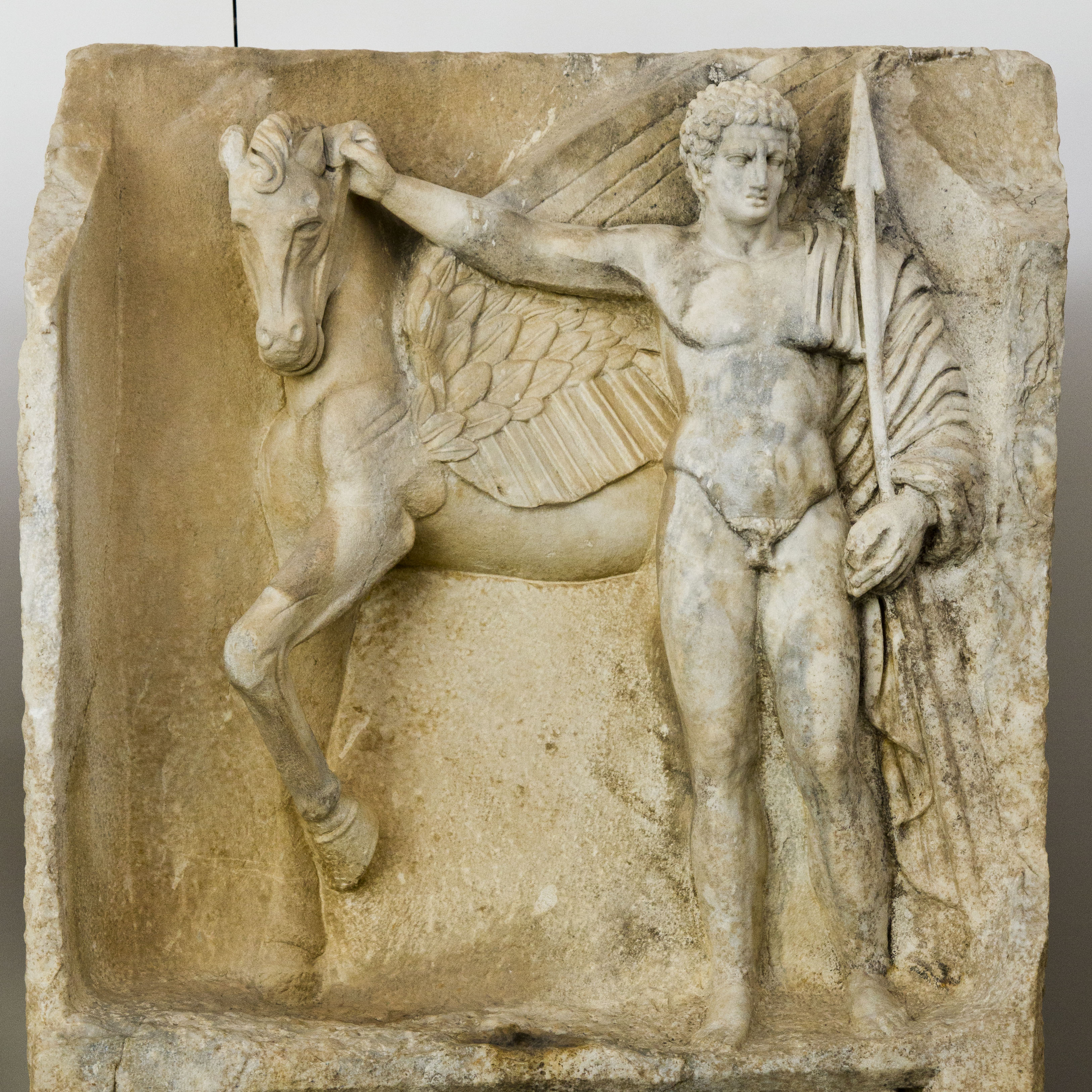
- Relief of Bellerophon and Pegasus, from Aphrodisias (near Geyre), Turkey (1st century AD)
- Other names: Hipponous
- Predecessor: Iobates
- Successor: Hippolochus
- Abode: Potniae, later Argos and Lycia
- Symbols: Cape, Spear

Genealogy
- Parents: Poseidon and Eurynome; Glaucus and Eurymede
- Siblings: Deliades and several paternal half-siblings
- Consort: Philonoe; Asteria
- Offspring: Isander, Hippolochus and Laodamia; Hydissos

Bellerophon or Bellerophontes (Ancient Greek: Βελλεροφῶν; Βελλεροφόντης, lit. 'slayer of Belleros') or Hipponous (Ancient Greek: Ἱππόνοος, lit. 'horse-knower'), was a divine Corinthian hero of Greek mythology, the son of Poseidon and Eurynome, and the foster son of Glaukos. He was "the greatest hero and slayer of monsters, alongside Cadmus and Perseus, before the days of Heracles". Among his greatest feats was killing the Chimera, a monster that Homer depicted with a lion's head, a goat's body, and a serpent's tail: "her breath came out in terrible blasts of burning flame."

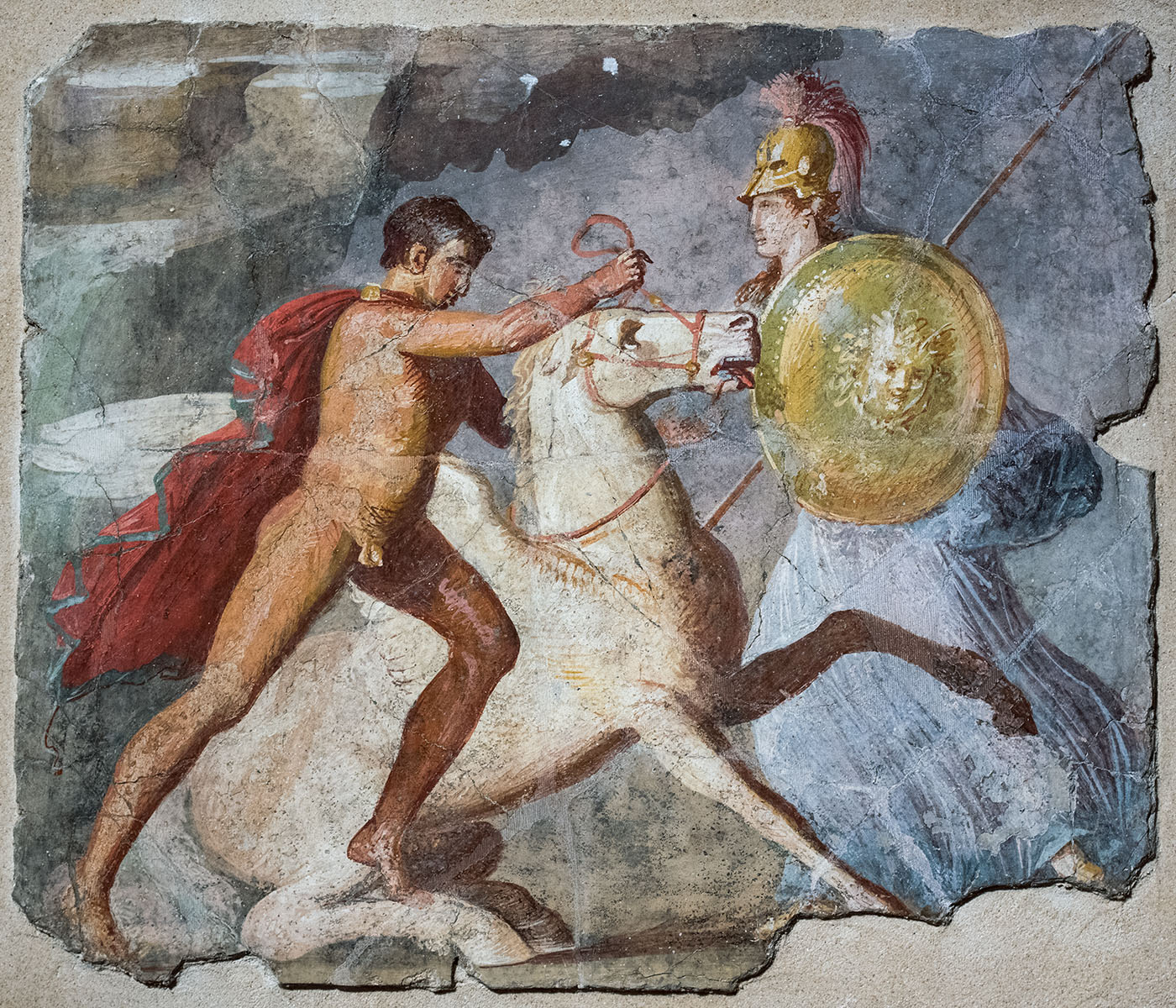
Bellerophon, Pegasus, and Athena, a Roman fresco in Pompeii, first half of the 1st century

Bellerophon was also known for capturing and taming the winged horse Pegasus with the help of Athena's charmed bridle, and earning the disfavour of the gods after attempting to ride Pegasus to Mount Olympus.

== Etymology ==
One possible etymology that has been suggested is: Βελλεροφόντης Bellerophóntēs, from Ancient Greek βέλεμνον bélemnon, βελόνη belóne or βέλος bélos ("projectile, dart, javelin, needle, arrow") and -φόντης -phóntēs ("slayer") from φονεύω phoneúō ("to slay"). (Note: The nomen agentis is also attested in the compound Ἀργειφόντης Argeïphontes, an epithet of the god Hermes that means "Slayer of [the Giant] Argos".)

However, Geoffrey Kirk says that "Βελλεροφόντης means 'slayer of Belleros'". According to the Scholia of Homer, Bellerophon was named so after having slain a Corinthian citizen of that same name by accident, while practicing his knife throwing, which caused him to be exiled to Lycia; this origin hypothesis would correspond to how Hermes got his epithet Argeiphontes (lit. 'slayer of Argus') after slaying Argus. According to some scholars, Belleros could have also been a local Lycian daimon, as Bellerophon's name "invited all sorts of speculation". (Note: It is also understood that Belleros is "a character whose further mentions don't exist in the extant literature".)

The only other authors to mention a Belleros killed by Bellerophon are two Byzantine scholars, John Tzetzes and Eustathius of Thessalonica, who both seem to be following Bellerophon's own name-etymology.

Robert Graves suggests a possible etymology via beleēphoron, interpreted as "bearing darts". Joseph T. Shipley interprets the name Bellerophon as meaning "slayer of monsters".

== Family ==
Bellerophon, formerly called Leophontes (Λεωφόντης), was the son of the mortal Eurynome (or Eurymede) and Poseidon; having been raised by his foster father Glaukos. He was the brother of Deliades (also named as Heliades, Peiren or Alcimenes).

Bellerophon was the father of Isander (Peisander), Hippolochus, and Laodamia (Deidamia or Hippodamia) by Philonoe, daughter of King Iobates of Lycia. Philonoe was also known under several other names: Alkimedousa or Cassandra, Anticleia, or Pasandra. In some accounts, Bellerophon also fathered Hydissos by Asteria, daughter of Hydeus.

== Mythology ==
The Iliad vi.155–203 contains an embedded narrative told by Bellerophon's grandson Glaucus (who was named after his great-grandfather), which recounts Bellerophon's myth. In this narrative, Bellerophon's father is Glaucus, who is the King of Potniae and son of Sisyphus; Bellerophon's grandsons Sarpedon and the younger Glaucus fight in the Trojan War.

In Stephanus of Byzantium's Ethnica, a genealogy is given for a figure named Chrysaor ("of the golden sword"), which would make him a double of Bellerophon: he is called the son of Glaucus (son of Sisyphus). Chrysaor has no myth besides that of his birth: from the severed neck of Medusa, who was with child by Poseidon, he and Pegasus are both born at the moment of her death. "From this moment we hear no more of Chrysaor, the rest of the tale concerning the stallion only ... [who visited the spring of Pirene] perhaps also for his brother's sake, by whom in the end he let himself be caught, the immortal horse by his mortal brother."

=== Exile in Argos ===
Bellerophon's brave journey begins in a familiar way, with an exile: in one narrative he has murdered his brother, whose name is given as Deliades, Peiren or Alcimenes; a more precise narrative involves him slaying a Corinthian citizen or nobleman called "Belleros" (Note: The suggestion, made by Kerenyi and others, makes the name "Bellerophontes" the "killer of Belleros", just as Hermes Argeiphontes is "Hermes the killer of Argus". Carpenter makes a carefully argued case for Bellerophontes as the "bane-slayer" of the "bane to mankind" in Iliad II.329, derived from a rare Greek word έλλερον elleron, explained by the grammarians as κακόν kakón, "evil". This έλλερον is connected by Katz with a Hesychius gloss ελυες elyes "water animal", and an Indo-European word for "snake", or "dragon", cognate to English eel, also found in Hittite Illuyanka, which would make Bellerophon the dragon slayer of Indo-European myth, represented by Indra slaying Vrtra in Indo-Aryan, and by Thor slaying the Midgard Serpent in Germanic. Robert Graves in The Greek Myths rev. ed. 1960 suggested a translation "bearing darts".) or "Belleron" by accident, while practicing knife-throwing with his friends, which causes the name change from Hipponous to Bellerophon.

In atonement for this crime, he has to make a plea to Proetus, a king in Tiryns, one of the Achaean strongholds of the Argolid. Proetus, by virtue of his kingship, cleanses Bellerophon of his crime. But when the wife of king Proetus – whose name is either Anteia or Stheneboea – tries to make advances on him, he rejects her, causing her to accuse Bellerophon of attempting to make advances on her instead. Proetus dares not satisfy his anger by killing a guest (who is protected by xenia), causing him to finally exile Bellerophon to King Iobates, his father-in-law from the plain of the River Xanthus in Lycia, bearing a sealed letter in a folded tablet which reads: "Please remove this bearer from the world: he attempted to violate my wife, your daughter."

Before opening the tablets, Iobates feasts with Bellerophon for nine days. On reading the tablet's message Iobates too feared the wrath of the Erinyes if he murdered a guest; so he sends Bellerophon on a mission that he deems impossible to survive: to kill the Chimera, living in neighboring Caria. The Chimera is a fire-breathing monster consisting of the body of a goat, the head of a lion and the tail of a serpent. This monster terrorized the nearby countryside.

On his way to Caria, he encounters the famous Corinthian fortune teller Polyeidos, who gives him advice on his upcoming battle, telling Bellerophon that in order to emerge victorious, he would be in need of the mythical Pegasus.

=== Capturing Pegasus ===
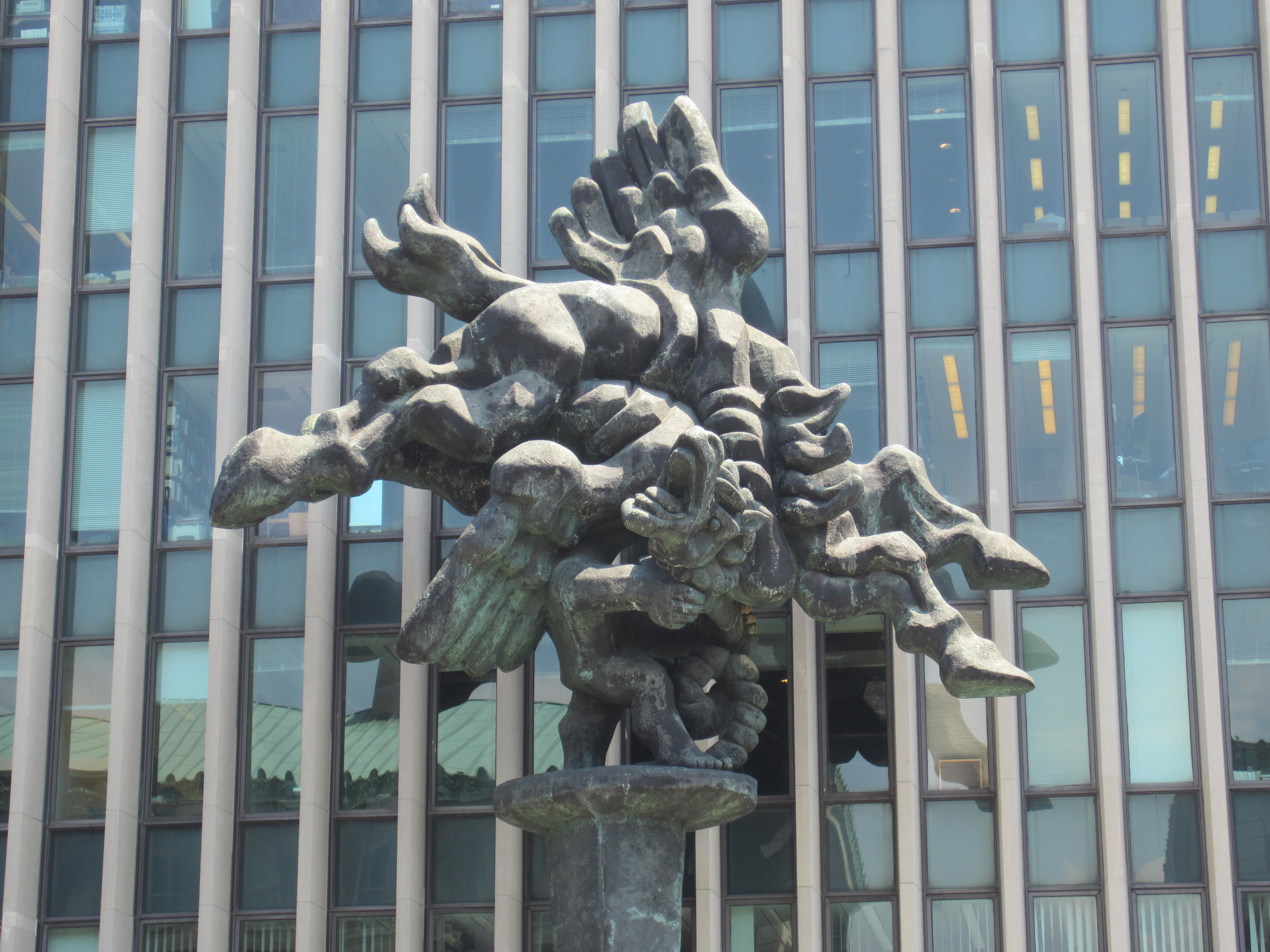
Bellerophon Taming Pegasus, by Jacques Lipchitz. 1977. Columbia University, New York.

To obtain the services of the untamed winged horse, Polyeidos tells Bellerophon to sleep in the temple of Athena. While Bellerophon sleeps, he dreams that Athena sets a golden bridle beside him, saying "Sleepest thou, prince of the house of Aiolos? Come, take this charm for the steed and show it to the Tamer thy father as thou makest sacrifice to him of a white bull." It is there when he awakes and he understands that he has to approach Pegasus while it is drinking from a well. When asked, Polyeidos tells him which well: the never-failing Pirene on the citadel of Corinth, the city of Bellerophon's birth. Bellerophon mounts his steed and flies off, back to Lycia where the Chimera is said to dwell.

Other accounts say that Athena brings Pegasus already tamed and bridled, or that Poseidon the horse-tamer, secretly the father of Bellerophon, brings Pegasus, as Pausanias understood.

=== The slaying of the Chimera ===
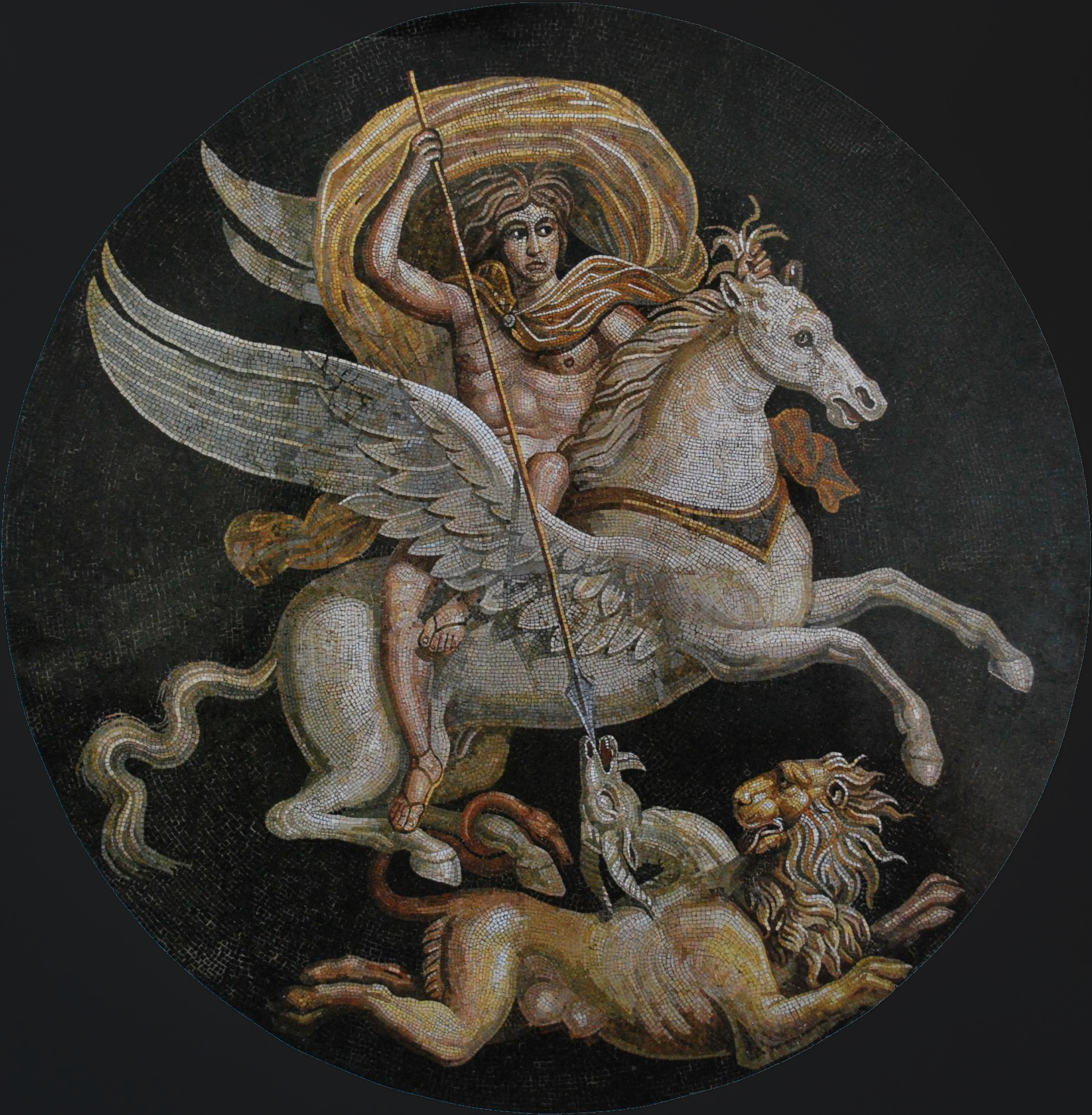
Bellerophon riding Pegasus and slaying the Chimera, central medallion of a Gallo-Roman mosaic from Autun, 2nd century AD, Musée Rolin

When Bellerophon arrives in Lycia to face the ferocious Chimera, he cannot harm the monster even while riding Pegasus. But when he feels the Chimera's hot breath, he is struck with an idea. He gets a large block of lead and mounts it on his spear. He then flies head-on towards the Chimera, holding out the spear as far as he can. Before breaking off his attack, he lodges the block of lead inside the Chimera's throat. The beast's fire-breath melts the lead, which blocks its air passage, suffocating it. Some red-figure pottery painters show Bellerophon wielding Poseidon's trident instead.

=== Return to Iobates ===
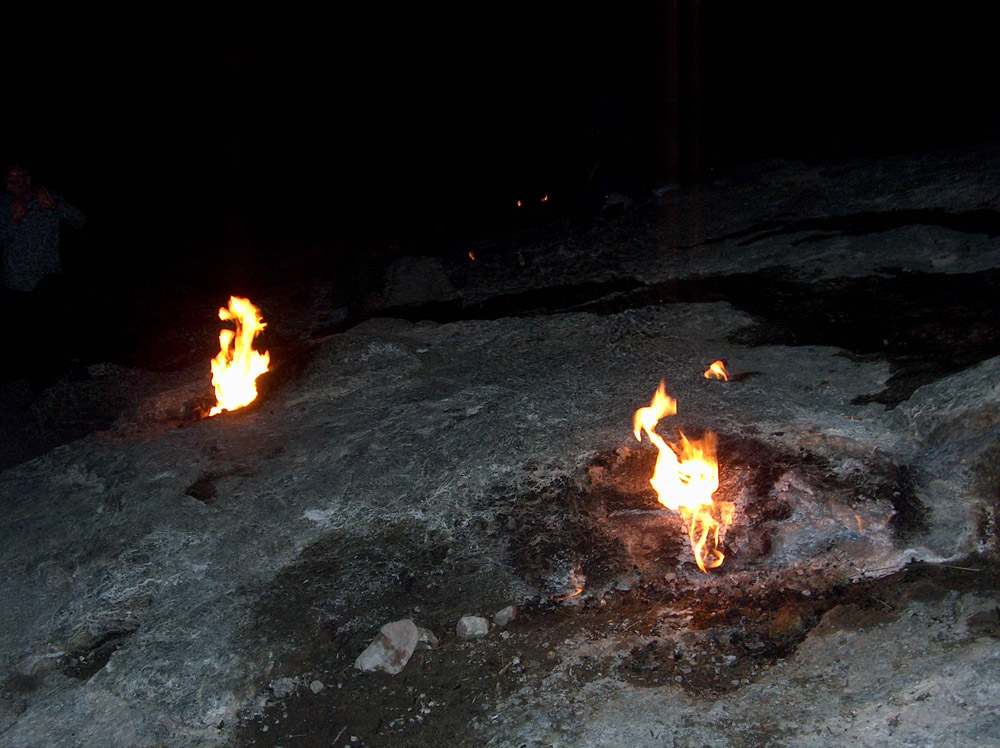
The eternal fires of Chimera in Lycia (modern-day Turkey) where the Chimera myth takes place.

When Bellerophon returns victorious to King Iobates, the king is unwilling to believe his story. A series of daunting quests ensues: Bellerophon is sent against the warlike Amazons, who fight like men, but he vanquishes them by dropping boulders from his winged horse; in some narratives, this is preceded by Bellerophon facing off the Solymi.

When he is sent against a Carian pirate, Cheirmarrhus, Iobates' men try to ambush him, but fail when Bellerophon kills everyone sent to assassinate him. The palace guards then are sent against him, but Bellerophon calls upon his father Poseidon, who floods the plain of Xanthus behind Bellerophon as he approaches. To defend themselves, the palace women rush from the gates with their robes lifted high to expose themselves. Unwilling to confront them while they are undressed, Bellerophon withdraws.

Iobates relents, produces the letter, and allows Bellerophon to marry his daughter Philonoe, the younger sister of Anteia, and shares with him half his kingdom, (Note: The inheritance of kingship through the king's daughter, with many heroic instances, is discussed by Finkelberg; compare Orion and Merope.) with its fine vineyards and grain fields. The lady Philonoe bears him Isander (Peisander), Hippolochus and Laodamia, who sleeps with Zeus the Counselor and bears Sarpedon, but is slain by Artemis.

Bellerophon takes his vengeance on Stheneboea and Proetus as well. After returning to the royal couple following the Chimera's death, he pretends to reciprocate Stheneboea's love. He promises to take her away to Caria, and she enthusiastically follows him on Pegasus. But while they are flying over Milos, Bellerophon throws her off the horse and she drowns in the waves below; fishermen find and return her body, and Bellerophon confesses his actions to Proetus, claiming that he has exacted appropriate justice from them both in the form of death for her and grief for him.

=== Flight to Olympus and fall ===
The emblem of the World War II British Airborne Forces – Bellerophon riding the flying horse Pegasus.

As Bellerophon's fame grows, so does his hubris. Bellerophon feels that because of his victory over the Chimera, he deserves to fly to Mount Olympus, the home of the gods. This act angers Zeus and he sends a gadfly to sting Pegasus, causing Bellerophon to fall back to Earth and die. Pegasus completes the flight to Olympus, where Zeus uses him as a pack horse for his thunderbolts.

According to other narratives, on the Plain of Aleion ("Wandering") in Cilicia, Bellerophon, who has been blinded after falling into a thorn bush, lives out his life in misery, "devouring his own soul", until he dies.

== Euripides's Bellerophon ==
Enough fragments of Euripides's lost tragedy Bellerophon remain (as about thirty quotations in surviving texts) to give scholars a basis for assessing its theme: the tragic outcome of his attempt to storm Olympus on Pegasus. An outspoken passage in which Bellerophon seems to doubt the gods' existence, due to the contrast between the wicked and impious, who live lives of ease, with the suffering of the good is apparently the basis for Aristophanes's imputation of "atheism" to the poet.

== Perseus on Pegasus ==
The replacement of Bellerophon by the more familiar culture hero Perseus was a development of Classical times that was standardized during the Middle Ages and has been adopted by the European poets of the Renaissance and later.

== Gallery ==
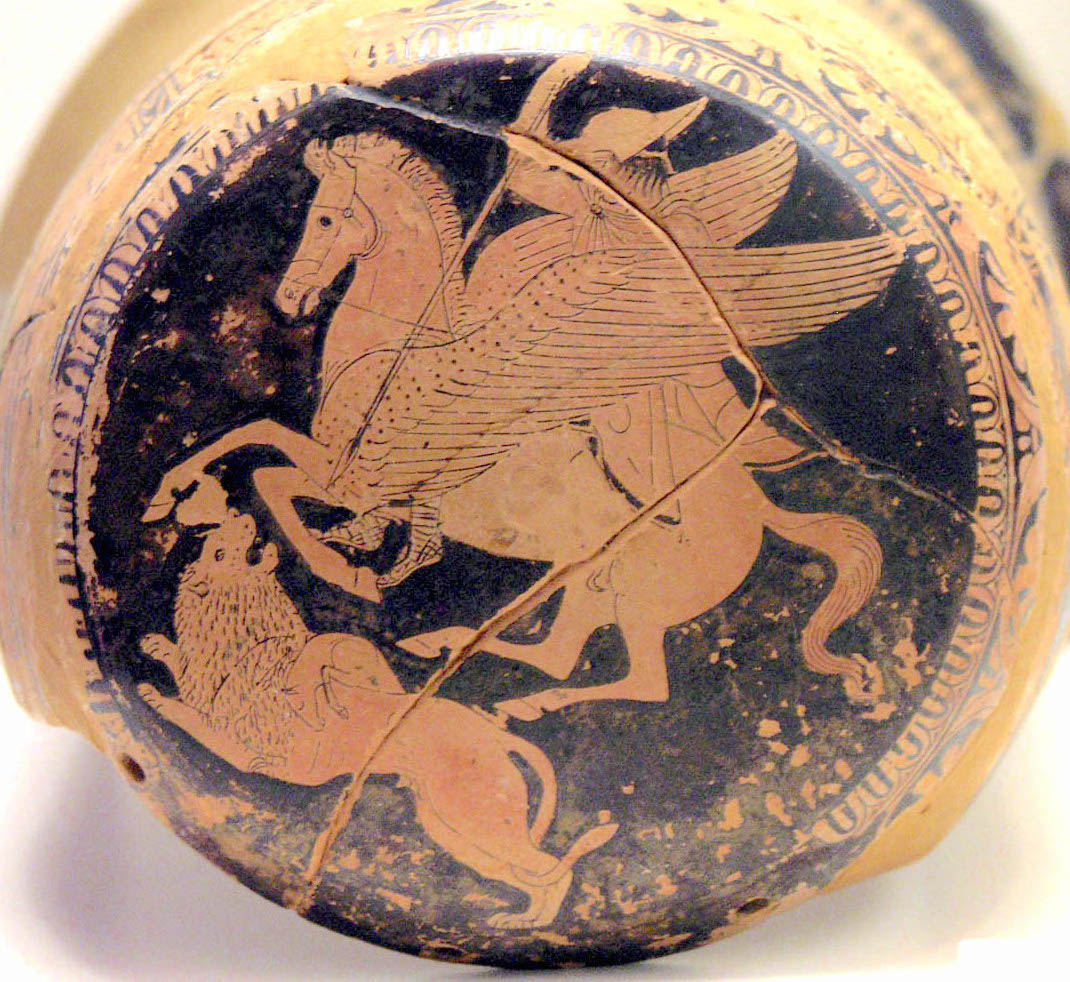
Bellerophon on Pegasus spears the Chimera, on an Attic red-figure epinetron, 425–420 BC

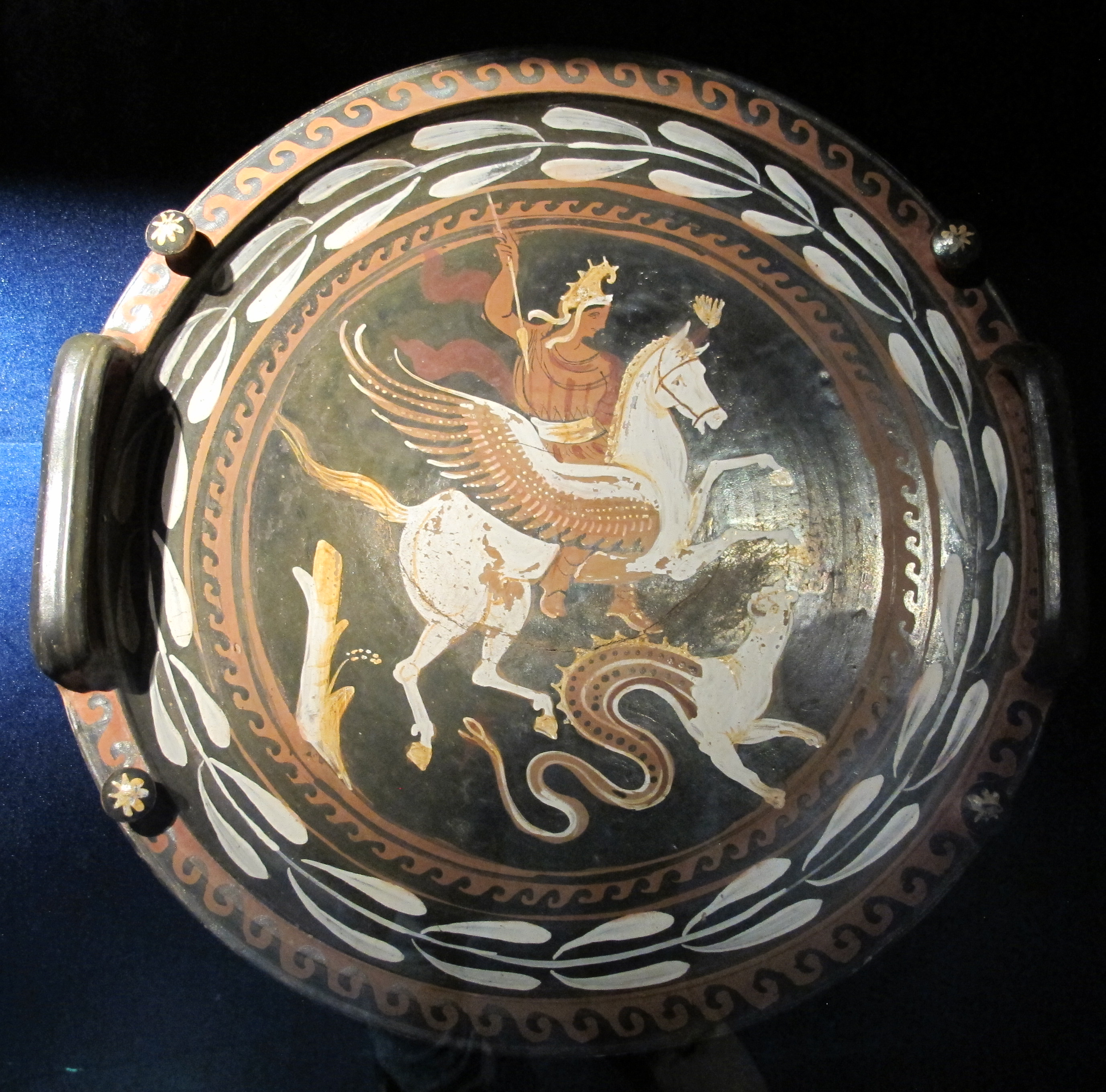
Bellerophon seated on Pegasus slaying the Chimera (300–350 B.C.), National Roman Museum – Palazzo Massimo

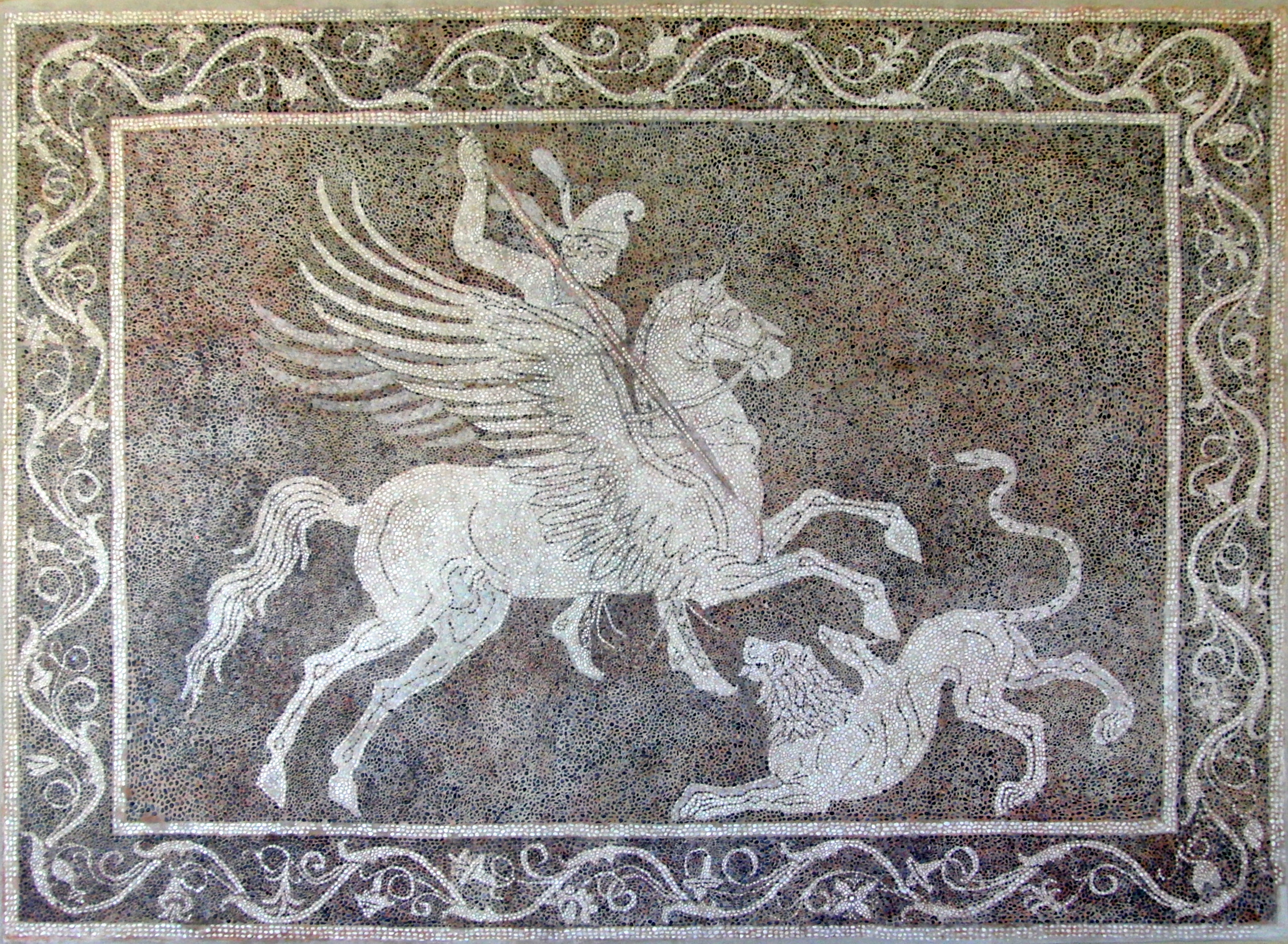
A Hellenistic Greek mosaic of Bellerophon riding Pegasus while slaying the Chimera, 300–270 BC, Archaeological Museum of Rhodes

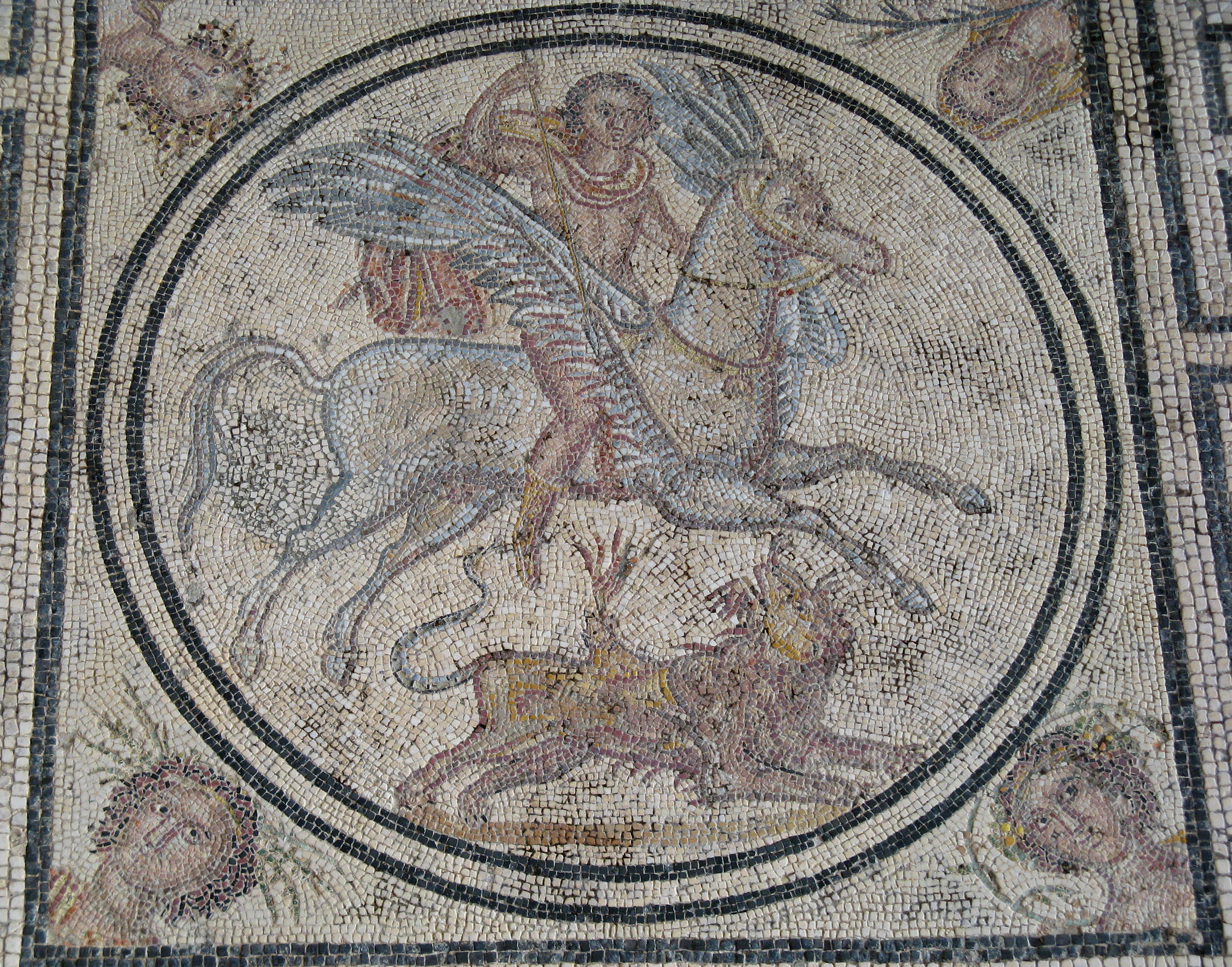
A Roman mosaic of Bellerophon slaying the Chimera, 2nd to 3rd centuries AD, Musée de la Romanité

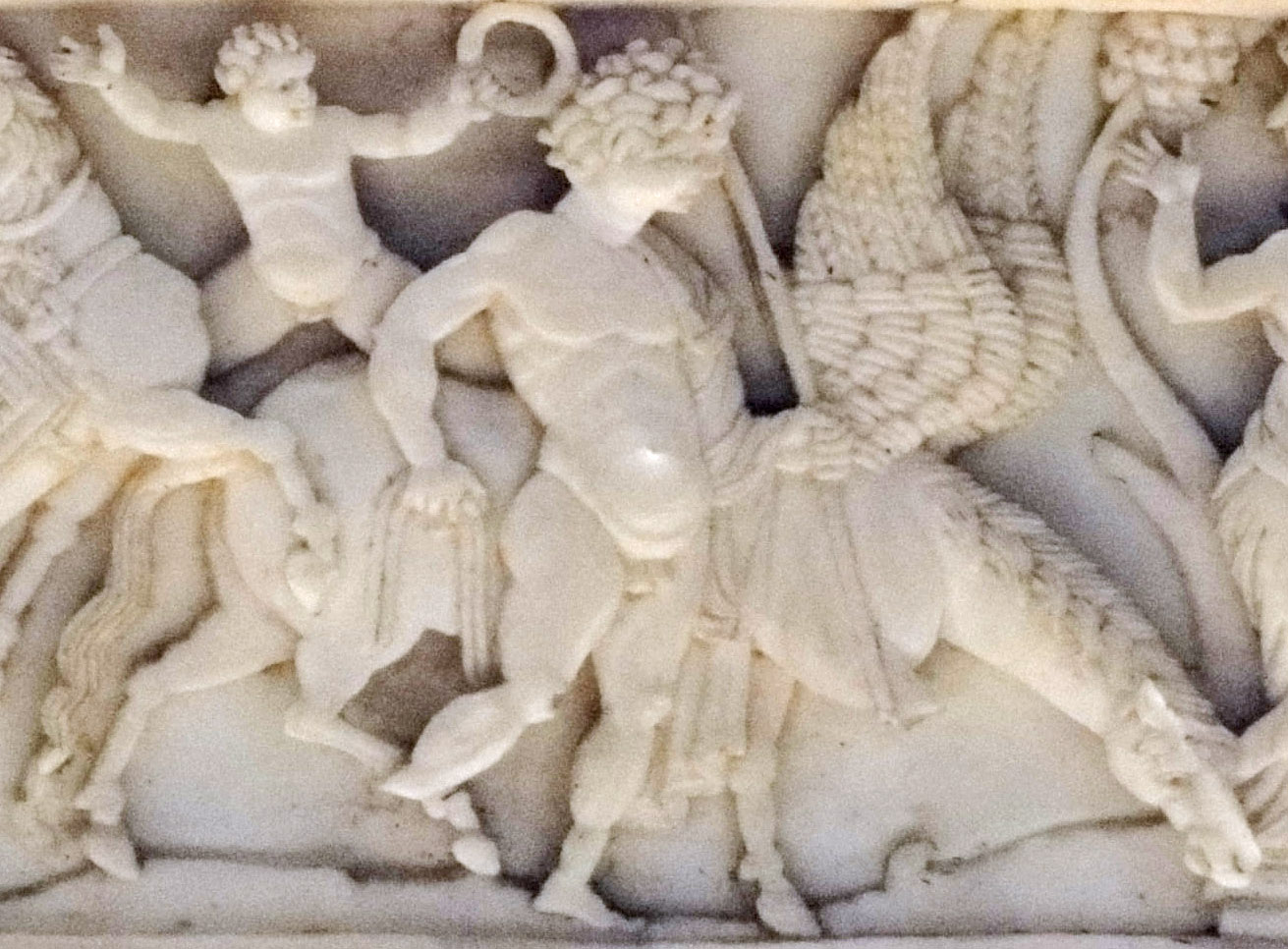
Veroli Casket panel detail showing Bellerophon with Pegasus, dating from 900 to 1000 AD.

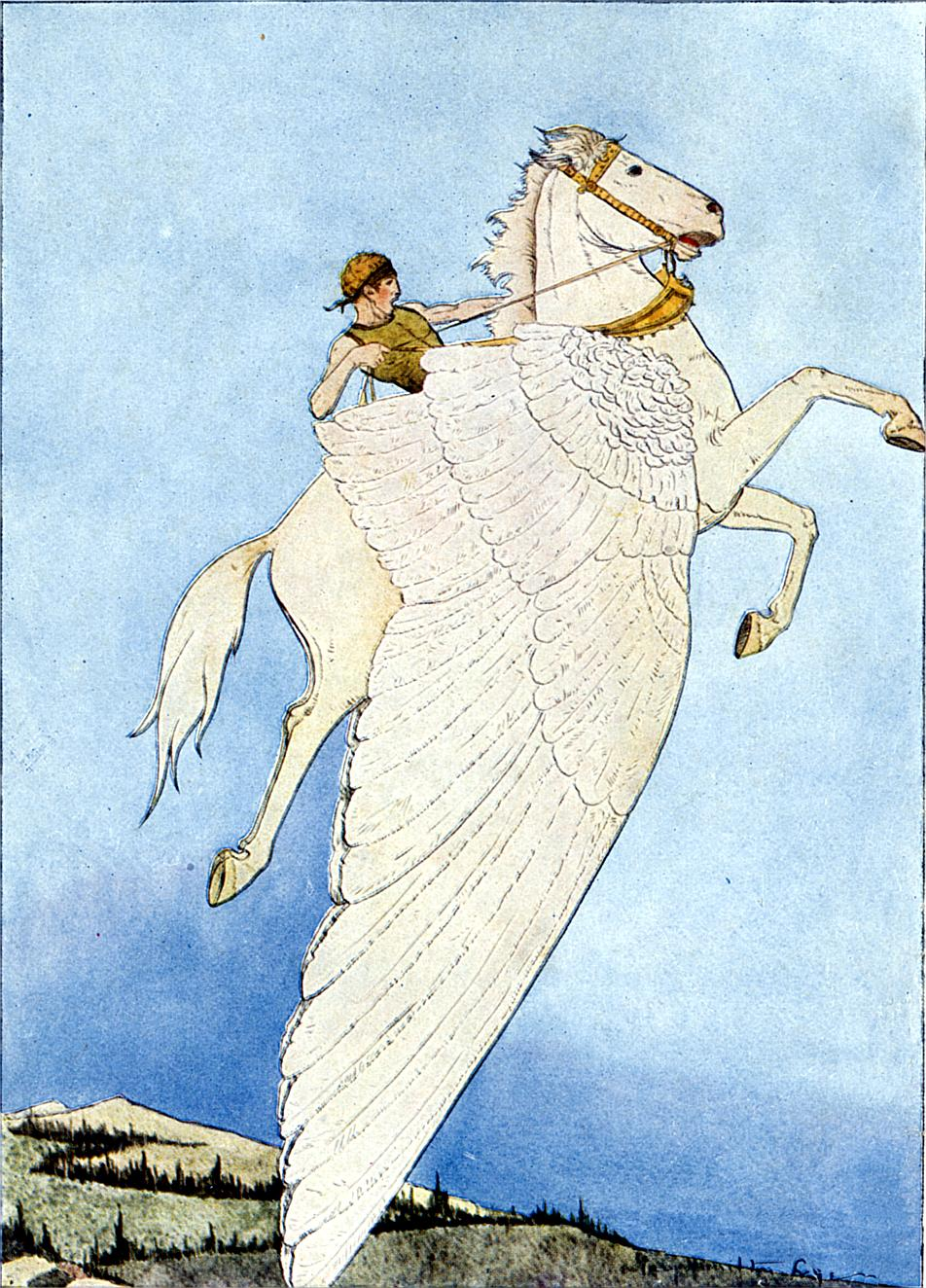
Bellerophon riding Pegasus (1914)
