= Iobates =

Lycian king in Greek mythology and host of Bellerophon

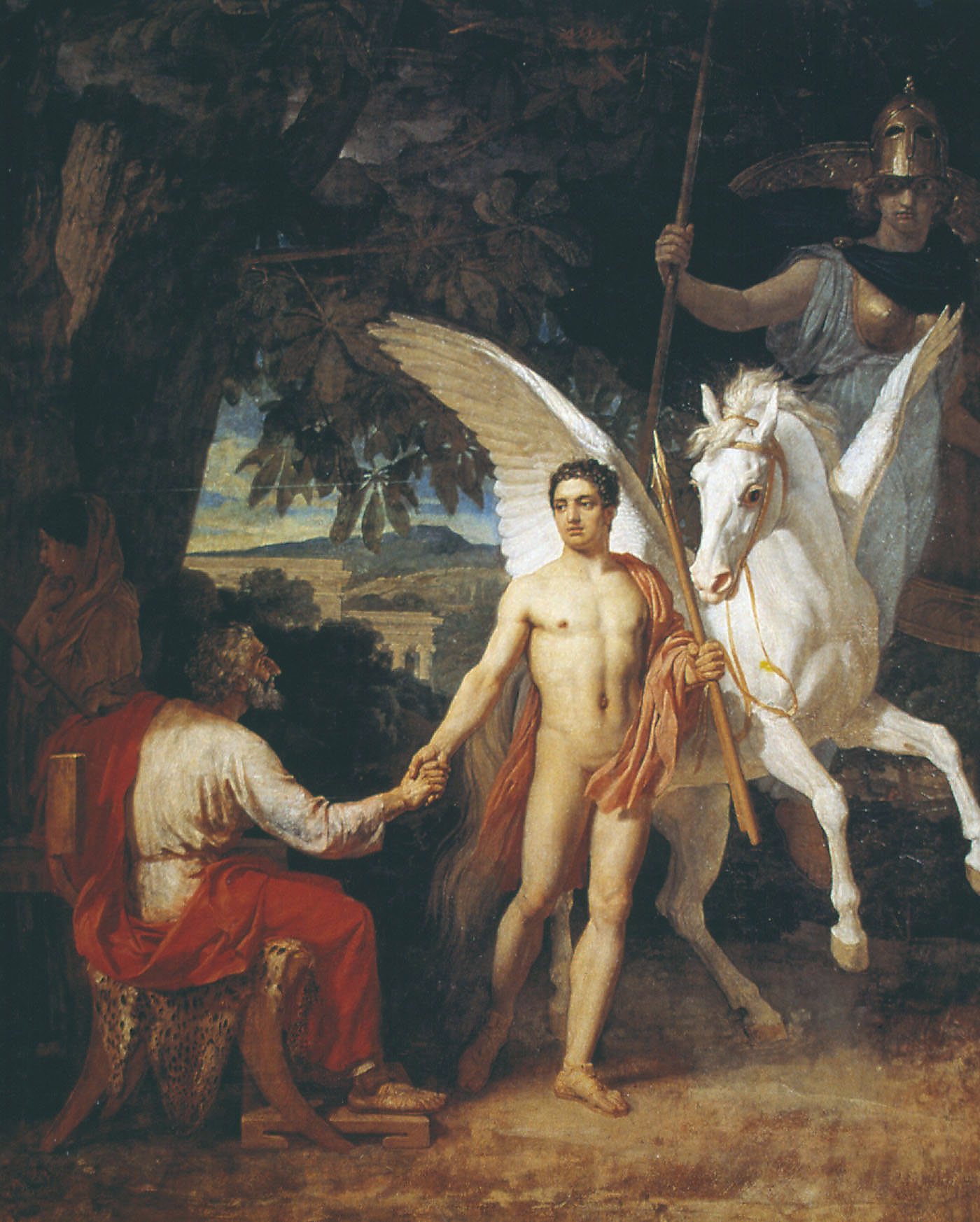
Bellerophon is sent to the campaign against the Chimera, 1829 painting by Alexander Ivanov.

In Greek mythology, Iobates /aɪˈɒbətiːz/ or Jobates (/ˈdʒɒbətiːz/; Ancient Greek: Ἰοβάτης, romanized: Iobátēs) is a Lycian king, the father of Antea and Philonoe. He was sometimes named Amphianax. In mythology, Iobates is the king who sent the hero Bellerophon on perilous quests such as the slaying of the Chimera and the battle against the Solymi at the request of his son-in-law Proetus who wished Bellerophon dead.

== Mythology ==
Bellerophon was sent into exile to the land of King Iobates. Proetus (king of Argos and Tiryns) wanted Iobates to kill Bellerophon, but Iobates feared the wrath of the gods if he murdered a guest. So he sent Bellerophon on a mission that he deemed impossible: to kill a fire-breathing monster, the Chimera.

An alternate version of the beginning of the quest is that Bellerophon encountered Proetus, who grew intensely jealous of him. Proetus was the son-in-law of Iobates, and sent Bellerophon to him with a sealed message that asked him to kill Bellerophon. Lycia at the time was in the middle of a horrific plague and Iobates didn't want to strain the population with a war, which would surely result if he murdered Bellerophon. Instead, he sent him to kill the Chimera.

The goddess Athena, realizing Bellerophon would surely die if he undertook this task alone, sent him aid in the form of the winged horse, Pegasus. Alternatively, Bellerophon sought out the wisest man in Lycia, Polyidus, who told him about the horse. To obtain the services of the winged horse, Polyidus told Bellerophon to sleep in the temple of Athena. While Bellerophon slept, he dreamed of Athena setting a golden bridle down beside him; it was there when he awoke. Bellerophon had to sneak up on Pegasus while it drank from a well (Polyidus told him which well).

Bellerophon mounted his steed and flew off to where the Chimera was said to dwell. When he arrived, the Chimera was truly ferocious, and he could not harm the monster even while riding on Pegasus. He felt the heat of the Chimera's breath and was struck with an idea. He got a large block of lead and mounted it on his spear. He then flew head-on towards the Chimera, holding out the spear as far as he could. Before he broke off his attack, he managed to lodge the lead in the creature's throat. The beast's fire-breath melted the lead, and blocked its air passage. The Chimera suffocated, and Bellerophon returned to King Iobates victorious. Iobates was unable to believe that this valiant hero deserved death, and so he allowed Bellerophon to marry his daughter. Alternatively, Iobates' daughter, Antea, loved Bellerophon. He scorned her and she committed suicide. Iobates' other daughter, Philonoe, had an affair with Bellerophon.
