= Trimilinda =

Ancient Lycian town

Trimilinda (Ancient Greek: Τριμιλίνδα) was a town of ancient Lycia, which per the Stadiasmus Patarensis was on a road from Balbura to Kibyra.

Its site is unlocated.
