= Bubon (Lycia) =

Human settlement in Turkey

Coordinates: 36°58′09″N 29°24′25″E

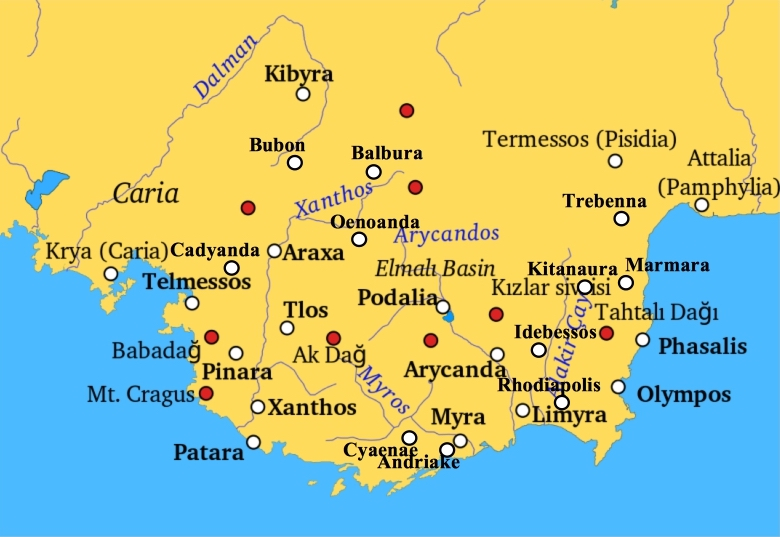
Cities of ancient Lycia. Red dots: mountain peaks, white dots: ancient cities

Bubon or Boubon (Ancient Greek: Βούβων) was a city of ancient Lycia noted by Stephanus of Byzantium; the ethnic name, he adds, ought to be Βουβώνιος, but it is Βουβωνεύς, for the Lycians rejoice in this form. The truth of this observation of Stephanus is proved by the inscription found on the spot: Βουβωνέων ἡ Βουλὴ καὶ ὁ Δῆμος.

Bubon is located west of ancient Balbura, near Ibecik, as confirmed by modern scholars. The city stood on a hill side commanding the entrance to the pass over the mountains.

Bubon is mentioned by Pliny, Ptolemy, and Hierocles. Pliny mentions a kind of chalk (creta) that was found about Bubon.

Bubon, along with Balbura and Oenoanda formed the district of Cabalia.

There is a small theatre built of sandstone and on the summit of the hill was the acropolis.

== Bishopric ==
Bubon was a Christian bishopric, a suffragan of the metropolitan see of Myra, the capital of the Roman province of Lycia. The names of two of its bishops, both called Romanus, are recorded in extant documents. One of them was at the First Council of Constantinople in 381. The other attended the Council of Chalcedon in 451 and was a signatory of the protest letter that the bishops of the province of Lycia sent in 458 to Byzantine Emperor Leo I the Thracian over the killing of Proterius of Alexandria.

No longer a residential bishopric, Bubon is today listed by the Catholic Church as a titular see.
