= J. J. Coulton =

British classical archaeologist (1940–2020)

John James (Jim) Coulton (1940–2020) was a British classical archaeologist with a particular expertise in ancient Greek civic and religious architecture.

== Life and academic career ==
Jim Coulton was born in the village of Pentney, Norfolk, on 24 February 1940, and was educated at Winchester College and St. John's College, Cambridge. He completed a doctorate in classical archaeology under the supervision of William Hugh Plommer. He went on to teach at the Australian National University, Canberra (1964–1968), the University of Manchester (1968–1969), and the University of Edinburgh (1969-1979), before succeeding John Boardman as Reader in Classical Archaeology at the University of Oxford and a Fellow of Merton College. Coulton retired in 2004 as Emeritus Fellow of Merton. A Festschrift was published to mark his retirement, Architecture and Archaeology in the Cyclades: Papers in Honour of J.J. Coulton, edited by M. Yeroulanou and M. Stamatopoulou (Oxford, 2005).

He served as Director of the Institute of Archaeology (1990-1993) and sat on the editorial board of the Oxford Monographs on Classical Archaeology series. He also served on the Council of the British Institute of Archaeology at Ankara and was an editor of its monograph series. He was instrumental in establishing an undergraduate degree in Classical Archaeology and Ancient History at Oxford in 2000.

Coulton died of cancer in Edinburgh on 1 August 2020. He was survived by his wife, Mary, and their children Joanna and Richard.

== Excavations ==
Coulton participated in excavations at Perachora and Lefkandi (under the auspices of the British School at Athens), of the Late Archaic fort at Phylla-Vrakhos in Euboea (with Efi Sapouna-Sakellaraki), and of Zagora on the island of Andros (under the direction of Alexander Cambitoglou), which is where he met his wife, Mary. He later acted as a consultant to the Zagora Archaeological Project, under the auspices of the Australian Archaeological Institute at Athens.

He several times worked at Oinoanda, in the Lycian highlands, under Alan Hall, and became interested in the nearby city of Balboura. Between 1985 and 1993 he led the Balboura Survey, which thoroughly explored the town itself and its rural hinterland with a wide range of methods.

Coulton participated in the Aphrodisias excavations researching the temple of Aphrodite and its conversion into a Christian church in late antiquity.

== Publications ==
- J.J. Coulton, The Architectural Development of the Greek Stoa (1976)
- J.J. Coulton, Greek Architects at Work: Problems of Structure and Design (1977; reprinted 1988)
- J.J. Coulton, "Highland Cities in South-West Turkey: The Oinoanda and Balboura Surveys", in Ancient Anatolia: Fifty Years' Work by the British Institute of Archaeology at Ankara, edited by R. Matthews (London, 1998), pp. 225-236.
- E.S. Sapouna-Sakellaraki, J.J. Coulton, and I.R. Metzger, The Fort at Phylla, Vrachos: Excavations and Researches at a Late Archaic Fort in Central Euboea (British School at Athens suppl. 33; 2002)
- J.J. Coulton (ed.), The Balboura Survey and Settlement in Highland Southwest Anatolia (2 volumes; British Institute at Ankara Monographs 43; 2012)

== Honours and awards ==
- Corresponding Member of the German Archaeological Institute (1982)
- Geddes-Harrower Professor at the University of Aberdeen (1988–1989)
