= Bridge at Oinoanda =

Bridge in Muğla, Turkey

Coordinates: 36°49′31″N 29°33′43″E

The Bridge at Oinoanda (or Oenoanda), or Bridge of Kemerarası, is an Ottoman arch bridge over the Xanthos river close to the Lycian site of Oinoanda in modern-day Turkey. It stands on or near the spot of a Roman bridge, whose existence became known in the 1990s through the find of an ancient bridge inscription.

== Roman bridge ==
=== Inscription stone ===
The Latin inscription stone was found at the antique site at Kemerarası, which lies at the foot of the Oinoanda hill (Urluca). Since ancient times, the place has been an important junction of the upper Xanthos valley. The existing Ottoman bridge runs parallel to the modern highway bridge. Lying face upwards, and largely intact, the limestone block measures 130 cm high, 64 cm wide and c. 42 cm thick. At the right side of the front face, a medium-sized chip makes textual additions necessary. Further difficulties arise from a number of peculiar spelling mistakes, which leads to the assumption that the mason was probably a Greek speaker.

=== Dating ===
The inscription, and thus also the construction of the bridge, are dated to the reign of the Roman governor in Lycia, Eprius Marcellus, who is known to have held the office in the year 54 AD. By comparing its contents with the known chronology, Milner dates the construction more precisely to 50 AD, making a connection with road building activities which started in the wake of the Roman annexation of Lycia seven years earlier under the supervision of Marcellus’ predecessor Quintus Vernanius. Probably, the Roman bridge should be understood as part of the Roman efforts to consolidate their hold on to the newly acquired province by improving the road system to move troops around more swiftly.

=== Inscription text ===
Transcription (with additions):

TI CLAVDIVS DRVSI F
CAESAR DEVS AVG GER
MANICVS PONTIFE[x]
MAX TR[I]BVNICIAE P[ot]
X COS V IMP X II DES[ig]
P P PONTEM PER T [CL?]
EPRIVM MARCELLVM
[l]EG AVG PROPR SO A

(Corrected and amended) translation:

Ti(berius) Claudius son of Drusus Caesar, God, Augustus, Germanicus, chief pontiff, with tribunician power for the 10th time, consul for the 5th time, with imperatorial acclamation for the '12th' (18th) time, co(n)s(ul) des[ig(nate)], Father of the Fatherland, (built) the bridge by the agency of T(itus) [Cl(odius)?] Eprius Marcellus, praetorian [l]egate of the Aug(ustus), so(dalis) A(ugustalis).

== See also ==
- List of Roman bridges
- Bridge near Kemer
- Roman architecture
- Roman engineering

== Sources ==
- Milner, N. P. (1998), "A Roman Bridge at Oinoanda", Anatolian Studies, vol. 48, British Institute at Ankara, pp. 117–123, doi:10.2307/3643051, JSTOR 3643051
