= Yamadı, Gölhisar =

Village in Turkey

Yamadı
- Village
- Location in Turkey
- Coordinates: 37°08′N 29°36′E
- Country: Turkey
- Province: Burdur
- District: Gölhisar
- Population (2021): 213
- Time zone: UTC+3 (TRT)

Yamadı is a village in the Gölhisar District of Burdur Province in Turkey. Its population is 213 (2021).
