= Gölhisar District =

District of Burdur Province, Turkey

- District
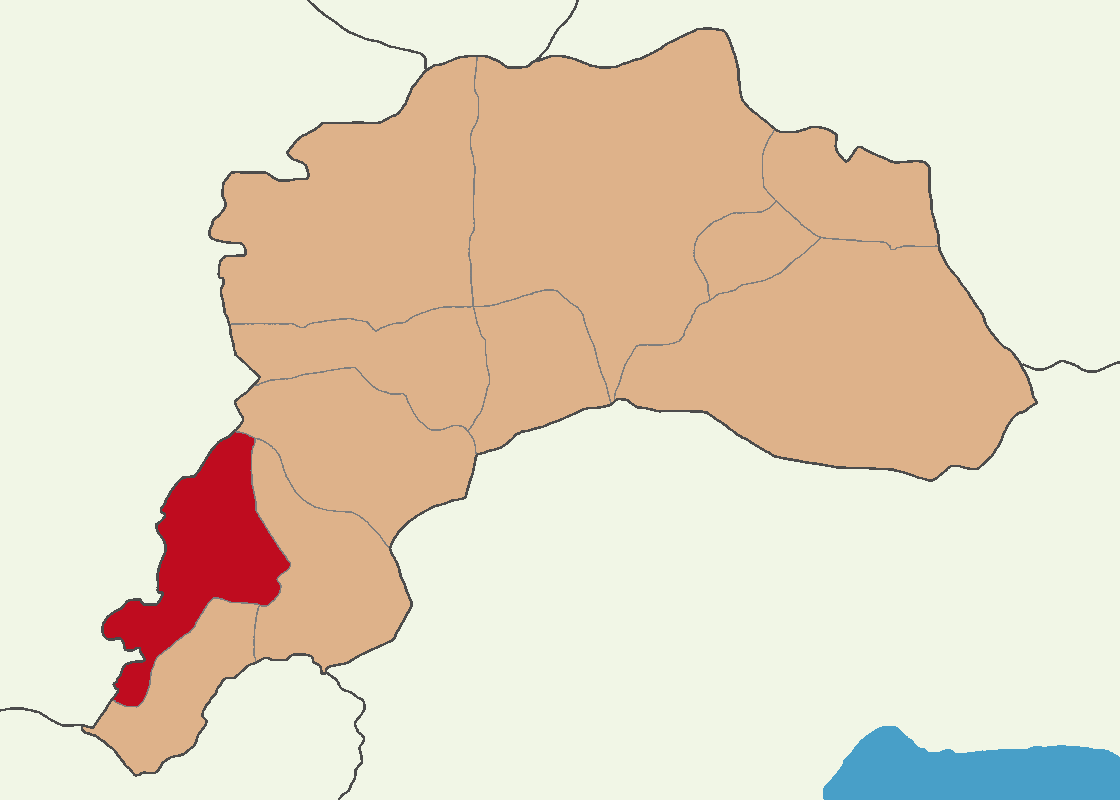
- Map showing Gölhisar District in Burdur Province

- Location in Turkey
- Coordinates: 37°08′N 29°30′E
- Country: Turkey
- Province: Burdur
- Seat: Gölhisar

Government
  - Kaymakam: Kadir Ulusoy
- Area: 494 km^{2} (191 sq mi)
- Population (2021): 23,064
  - Density: 47/km^{2} (120/sq mi)
- Time zone: UTC+3 (TRT)
- Website: www.golhisar.gov.tr

Gölhisar District is a district of the Burdur Province of Turkey. Its seat is the town of Gölhisar. Its area is 494 km^{2}, and its population is 23,064 (2021).

== Geography ==
Gölhisar District is located in the Dalaman Stream Water Collection Basin at the foothills of the Western Taurus Mountains, 107 to Burdur, 111 to Denizli, 90 to Fethiye, 135 km to Antalya, southwest of Burdur. Its average altitude is 945 meters. The area is an important Ramsar Site.

Gölhisar Plain is a sediment plain and is irrigated by the waters of Yapraklı Dam. Agriculture is important to the local economy with Beets, anise, cereals, vegetables and fruits being grown. The region contains the most important music and folklore cultures of the region.

== Composition ==
There are two municipalities in Gölhisar District:

- Gölhisar
- Yusufça

There are 12 villages in Gölhisar District:

- Asmalı
- Çamköy
- Elmalıyurt
- Evciler
- Hisarardı
- İbecik
- Karapınar
- Kargalı
- Sorkun
- Uylupınar
- Yamadı
- Yeşildere
