= Elmalıyurt, Gölhisar =

Village in Turkey

Elmalıyurt
- Village
- Location in Turkey
- Coordinates: 36°55′N 29°22′E
- Country: Turkey
- Province: Burdur
- District: Gölhisar
- Population (2021): 493
- Time zone: UTC+3 (TRT)

Elmalıyurt is a village in the Gölhisar District of Burdur Province in Turkey. Its population is 493 (2021).
