= Balbura fresini =

Scientific classification
- Domain: Eukaryota
- Kingdom: Animalia
- Phylum: Arthropoda
- Class: Insecta
- Order: Lepidoptera
- Superfamily: Noctuoidea
- Family: Erebidae
- Subfamily: Arctiinae
- Genus: Balbura
- Species: B. fresini

Binomial name
- Balbura fresini Jörgensen, 1935

Species of moth

Balbura fresini is a moth of the subfamily Arctiinae. It is found in Paraguay.
