= Gölhisar =

- Municipality
- Location in Turkey
- Coordinates: 37°08′27″N 29°30′27″E
- Country: Turkey
- Province: Burdur
- District: Gölhisar

Government
  - Mayor: İbrahim Sertbaş (AKP)
- Elevation: 1,008 m (3,307 ft)
- Population (2023): 23,626
- Time zone: UTC+3 (TRT)
- Postal code: 15400
- Website: www.golhisar.bel.tr

Gölhisar (literal translation: "lake castle") is a town in Burdur Province in the Mediterranean region of Turkey. It is the seat of Gölhisar District. Its population is 16,118 (2021).

== History ==
During antiquity Golhisar was site of an ancient city called Kibyra, the capital of a tetrapolis comprising Kibyra itself, Bubon, Balbura and Inuanda, which according to Herodotus were founded by the Pisidians around 1000BC, Roman ruins including a 180 meter wide theater can be still seen. In the Byzantine era the town was the seat of a Christian Bishopric.

Ibn Battuta visited the small town of Qul Hisar, noting "There is no way to reach it except by a path like a bridge constructed between the rushes and the water, and broad enough only for one horse-man."

Gölhisar became a district on January 13, 1953 with the merger of Uluköy and Horzum Districts. It got its name from the fortress built on the island in the middle of the lake, 6 km from the district.

== See also ==
- Kibyra
