= Karapınar, Gölhisar =

Village in Turkey

Karapınar
- Village
- Country: Turkey
- Province: Burdur
- District: Gölhisar
- Population (2021): 127
- Time zone: UTC+3 (TRT)

Karapınar is a village in the Gölhisar District of Burdur Province in Turkey. Its population is 127 (2021).
