= Lucius Septimius Flavianus Flavillianus =

Lucius Septimius Flavianus Flavilatus was from Oenoanda in the region of Lycia and lived in the 3rd century AD.

Some of his achievements are documented by inscriptions in the base of a statue, discovered on the site of Oenoanda in 2002. He was an early recruit to the Roman army, and also a champion in wrestling and pankration.

Around 212, he won a boys' wrestling competition. An inscription records

Lucius Septimius Flavianus Flavillianus, paradoxos, having been crowned in the boys' wrestling, when Aurelius Kroisos, son of Simonides, son of Kroisos, son of Tlepolemos was agnothete of the thirteenth panegyris of the Meleagreia - the fatherland honoured propitiously.

— Inscription,
