= Evciler, Gölhisar =

Village in Turkey

Evciler
- Village
- Location in Turkey
- Coordinates: 37°03′26″N 29°29′58″E
- Country: Turkey
- Province: Burdur
- District: Gölhisar
- Area: 0.67 km^{2} (0.26 sq mi)
- Population (2021): 287
  - Density: 430/km^{2} (1,100/sq mi)
- Time zone: UTC+3 (TRT)

Evciler is a village in the Gölhisar District of Burdur Province in Turkey. Its population is 287 (2021). The village to the west is Asmalı.
