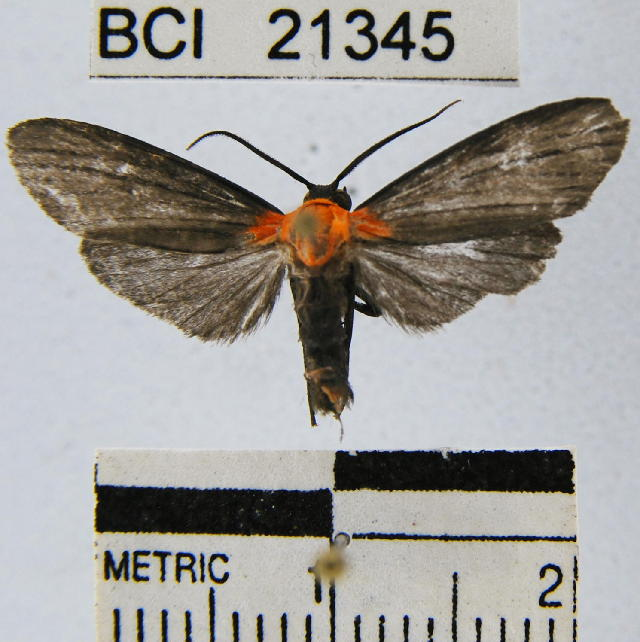

Scientific classification
- Kingdom: Animalia
- Phylum: Arthropoda
- Class: Insecta
- Order: Lepidoptera
- Superfamily: Noctuoidea
- Family: Erebidae
- Subfamily: Arctiinae
- Genus: Balbura
- Species: B. dorsisigna

Binomial name
- Balbura dorsisigna Walker, 1854

= Balbura dorsisigna =

Species of moth

Balbura dorsisigna is a moth of the subfamily Arctiinae first described by Francis Walker in 1854. It is found in Panama, Honduras, Venezuela and Ecuador.
