= Cibyra =

Ancient city in Turkey

Coordinates: 37.1601°N 29.4892°E

Kibyra
- Κίβυρα (Ancient Greek)
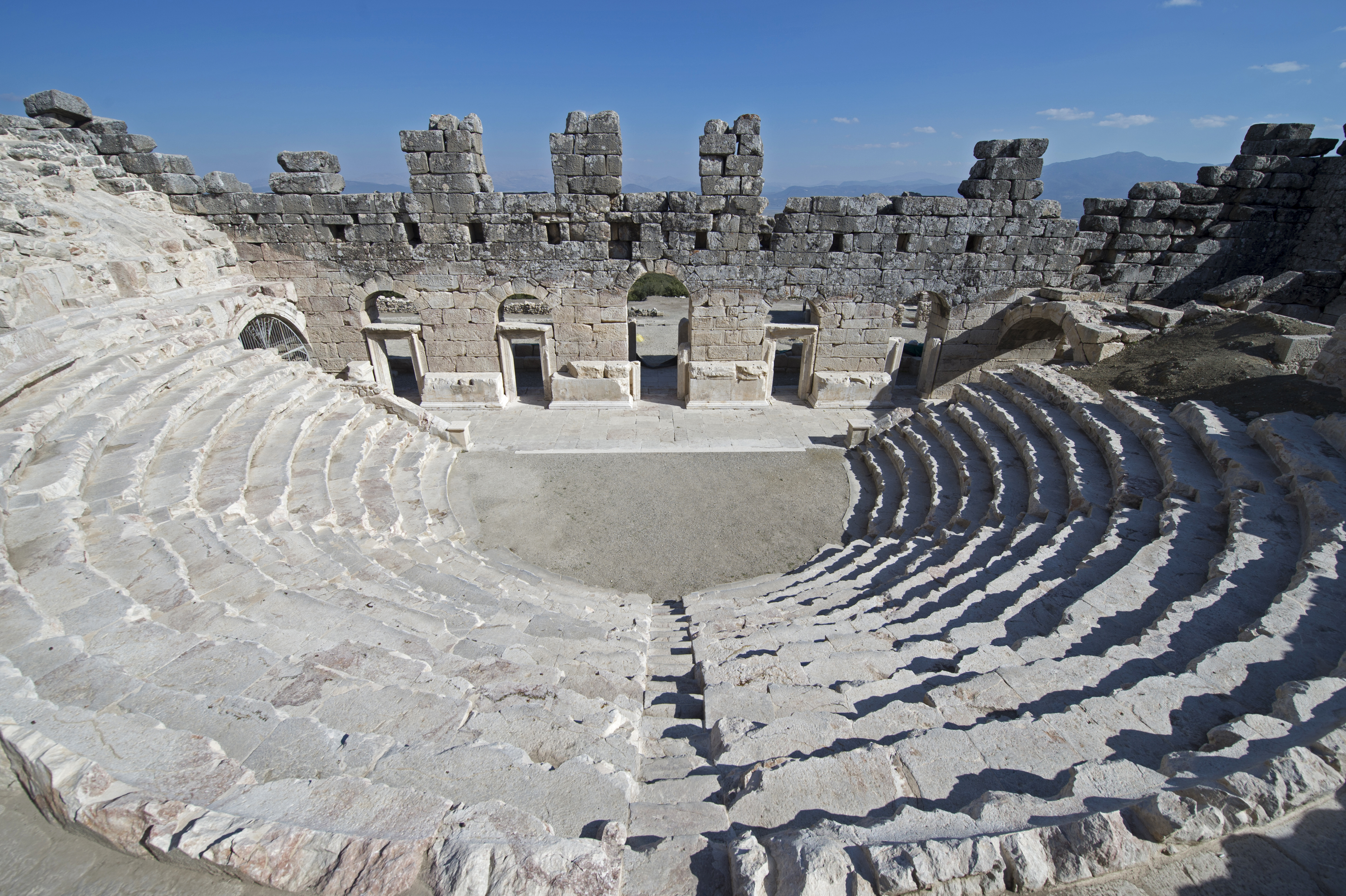
- Roman theatre of Kibyra

- Location within Turkey
- Type: Settlement
- Location: Gölhisar, Burdur Province, Turkey
- Region: Pisidia

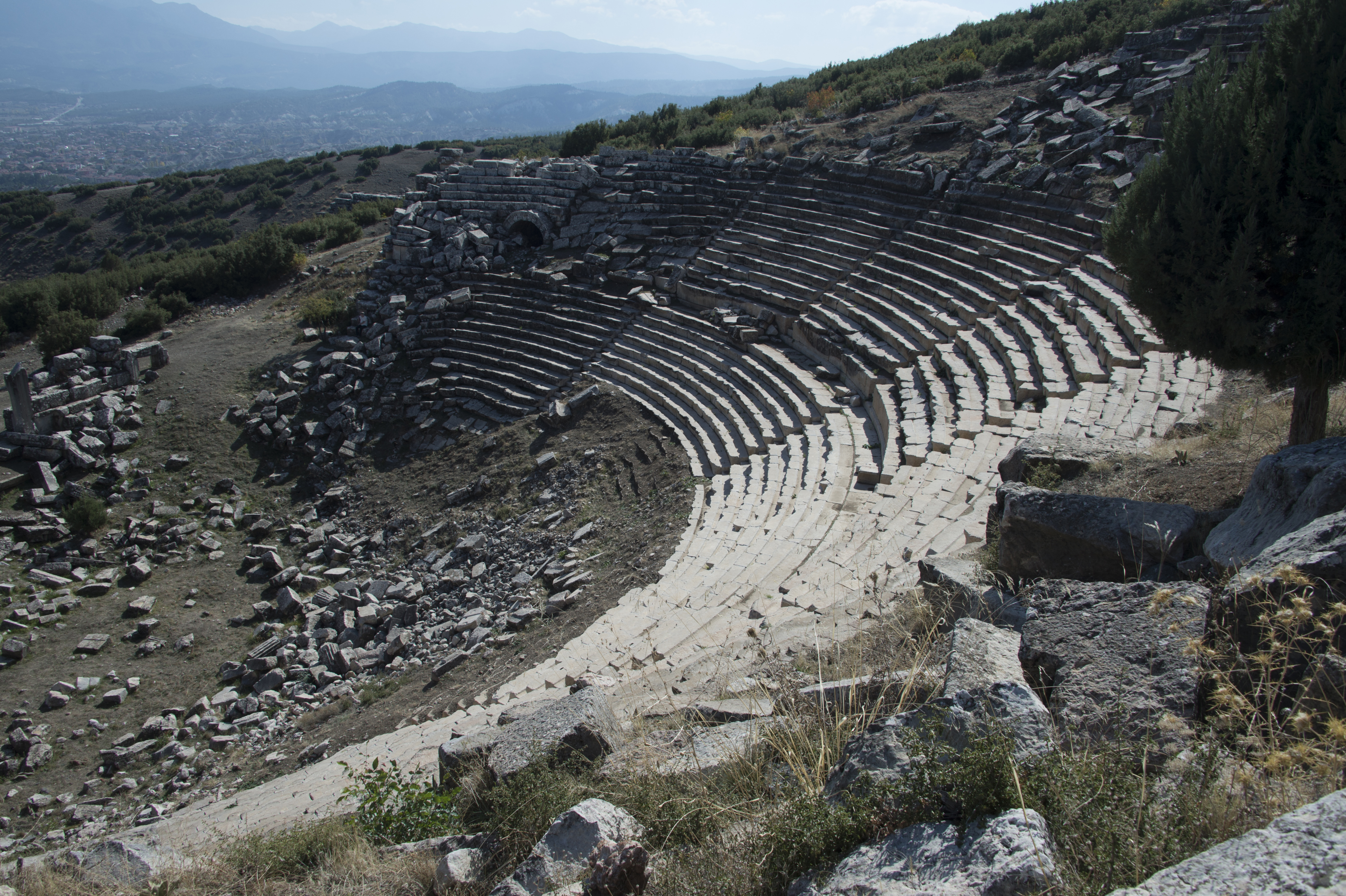
Kibyra theatre

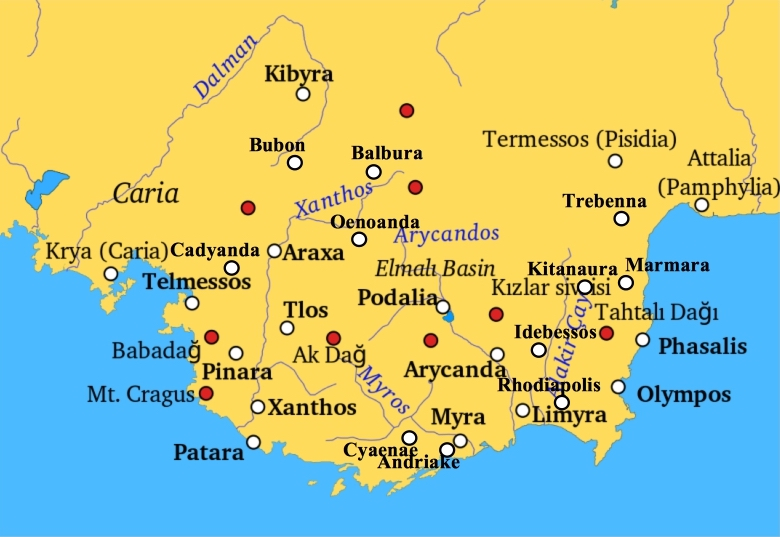
Cities of ancient Lycia

Cibyra or Kibyra (Greek: Κίβυρα), also referred to as Cibyra Magna, was an Ancient Greek city near the modern town of Gölhisar, in Burdur Province. It lay outside the north-western limits of the ancient province of Lycia and was the chief city of an independent state known as Cibyratis. Since 2016 it has been included in the Tentative list of World Heritage Sites in Turkey.

== Location ==
The site is identified by its inscriptions.

The Cibyratic plain is about 300 m above sea level. Cibyratis comprised the highest part of the basin of the Xanthus (river), and all the upper and probably the middle part of the basin of the Indus river, for Strabo describes Cibyratis as reaching the Rhodian Peraea. Mount Cragus (Babadağ) at 6,500 feet (1,969 m) bounded it on the west and separated it from Caria. Pliny's brief description states that the river Indus, which rises in the hills of the Cibyratae, has sixty perennial tributaries.

== History ==
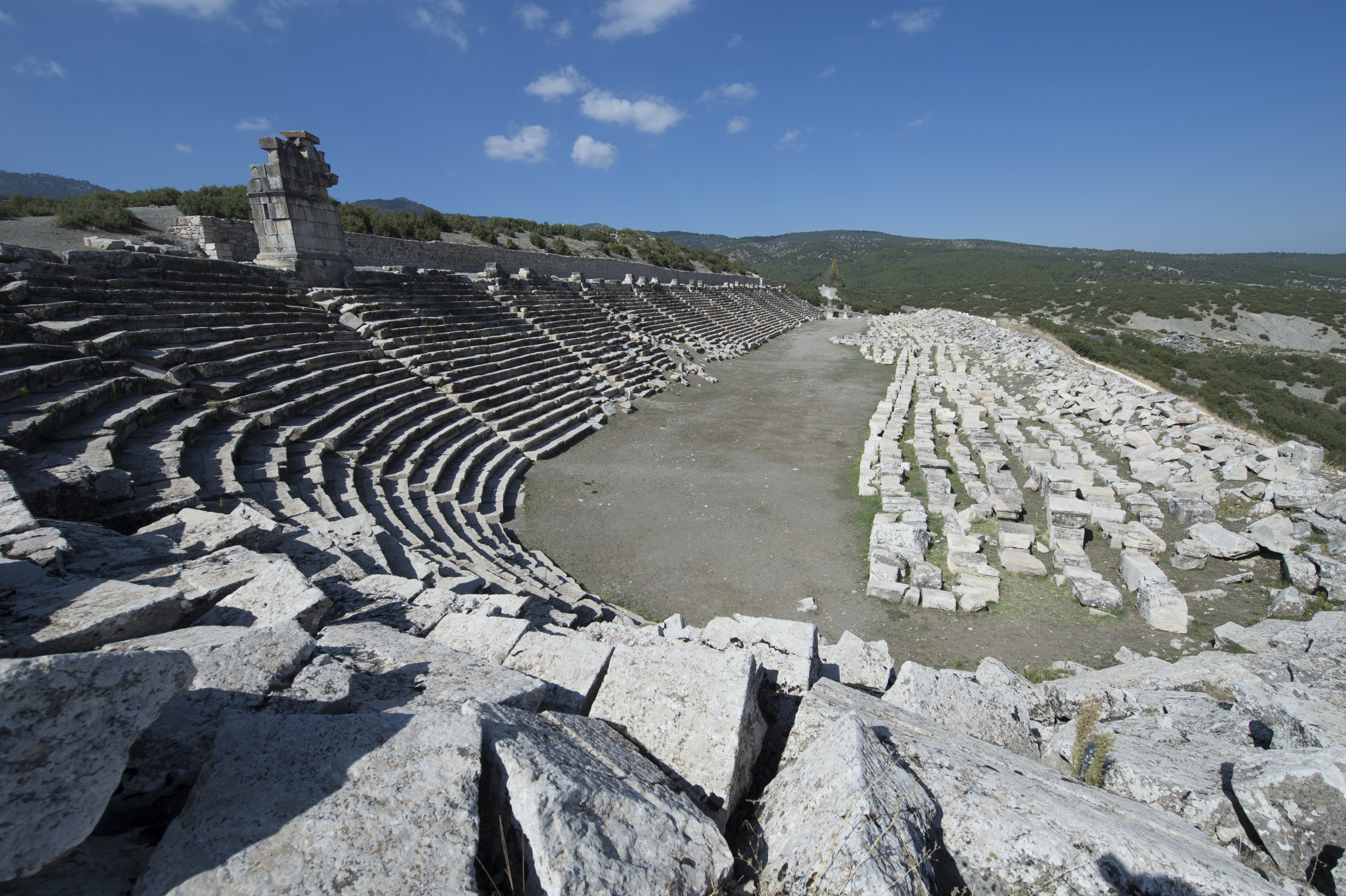
The Stadium

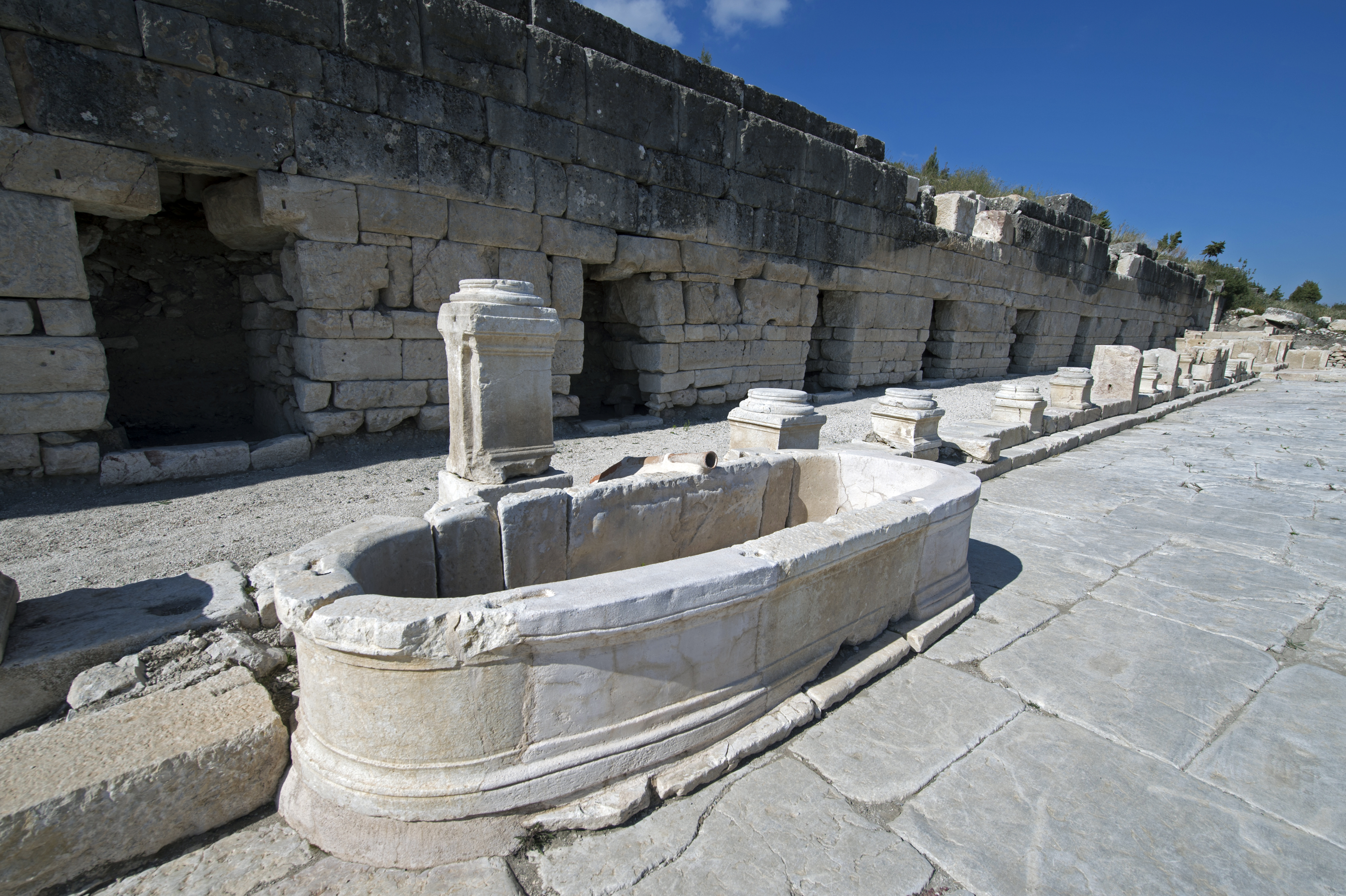
Agora and columnaded street

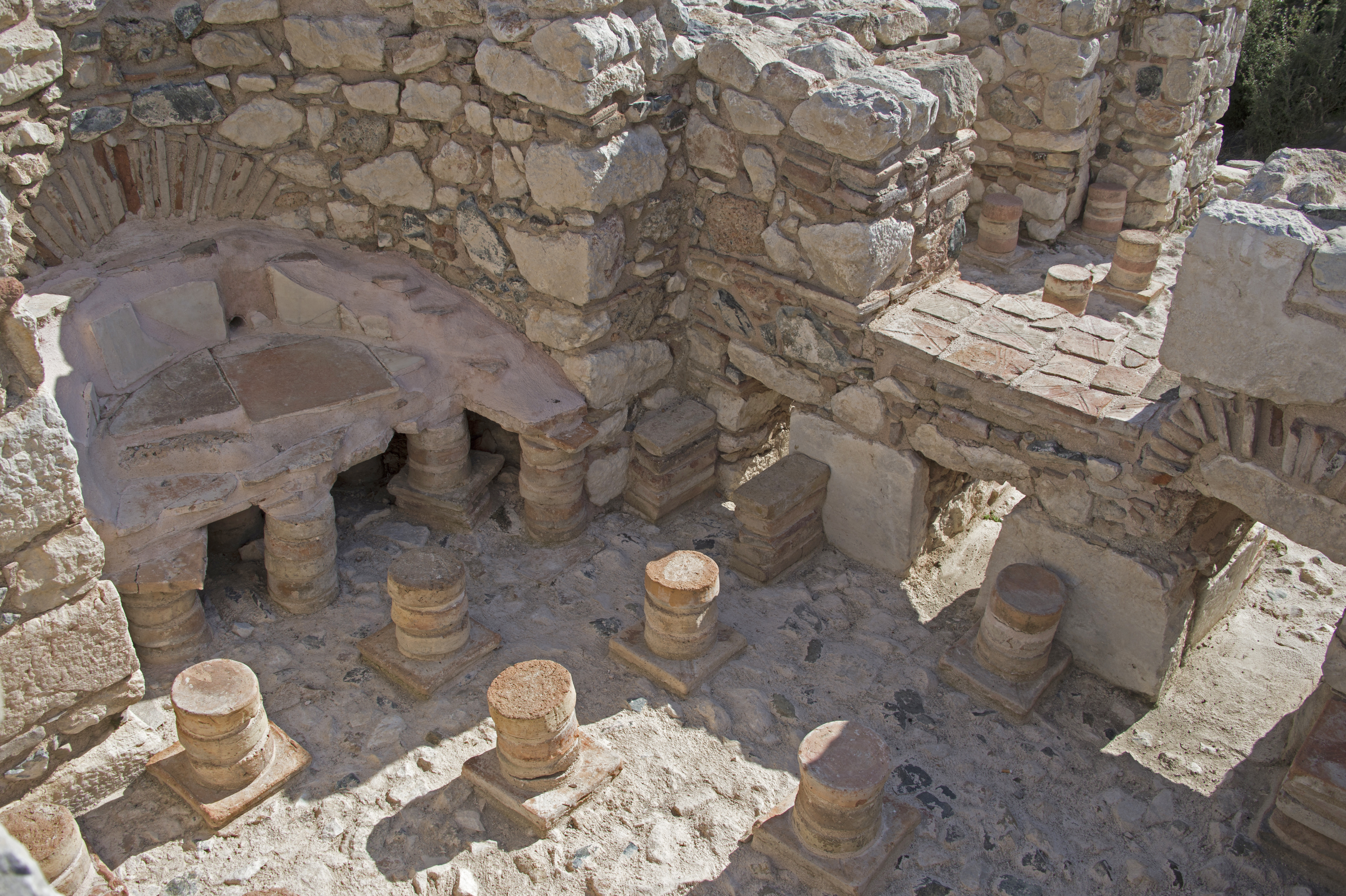
East Roman bath

The city is mentioned by ancient literary sources. According to Strabo, the Cibyratae (Ancient Greek: Κιβυρᾶται) were said to be descendants of Lydians who migrated and occupied the Cibyratis region and subdued the neighbouring Pisidians. A short time after their arrival they moved their settlement to a new city. The move to the city is supported by archaeological finds at the Uytuptnar site about 18 km away from Cibyra where ruins from the early Iron Age were probably the previous settlements dating from around 3-4th c. BC before the great move.

During Eumenes II sovereignty (197-159 BC), Cibyra seems to have been ruled by the Kingdom of Pergamon.

The city grew to be powerful in the second century BC, Ancient sources and other written documents indicate that Kibyra was famous for its blacksmithing, leather processing and horse breeding. Other research shows that pottery production was very intense in the area also. Its territory extended between Pisidia and the adjoining Milyas to Lycia and the Peraea of the Rhodians. At this time it joined with three neighbouring Lycian towns, Bubon, Balbura, and Oenoanda, to form a confederation called the Tetrapolis. Within this confederation, the other three cities had one vote, but Cibyra had two votes, since it could muster 30,000 infantry and 2,000 cavalry.

Cibyra is first mentioned by Livy in his account of Ganaeus Manlius Vulso's operations in 189 BC during the Galatian War. Manlius approached Cibyra from the upper part of the Maeander river valley and through Caria. He probably advanced upon it by the valley of Karaook, through which a road led from Cibyra to Laodicea on the Lycus. Manlius demanded and got from Moagetes I, the tyrant of Cibyra, 100 talents and 10,000 medimni of wheat. Livy says that Moagetes controlled Syleum and Alimne, in addition to Cibyra. William Smith suggested that Alimne could be identified with the remains of a large town on an island in lake Gölhisar (east of modern Gölhisar), which were connected to the mainland by an ancient causeway.

Following the Treaty of Apamea in 188 BC, Cibyra became part of the Attalid Kingdom.

=== Roman Rule ===
In 133 BC, the last Attalid king, Attalus III left his kingdom to the Roman Republic, which reconstituted it as the province of Asia. It is not clear whether Cibyra formed part of the new province or was granted its freedom like the rest of Lycia.

In 83 BC, during the First Mithridatic War, the Roman general Lucius Licinius Murena deposed the last tyrant of Cibyra, Moagetes II, who was the son of one Pancrates, and dissolved the Tetrapolis. Balbura and Bubon were assigned to the Lycian League.

Writing at the beginning of the 1st century AD, Strabo says that the Cibyratae spoke four languages: Pisidian, Solymian, Greek, and Lydian. This makes Cibyra the last locality where the Lydian language, by then extinct in Lydia itself according to extant accounts, is attested.

Cibyra was heavily damaged by an earthquake in 23 AD in the time of Tiberius, who recommended a Senatus Consultum be enacted relieving it from payment of taxes (tributum) for three years. In the passage discussing these events, Tacitus calls it the civitas Cibyratica apud Asiam (Cibyratic community in Asia). Most of the buildings preserved in the city were erected after the earthquake. Subsequent Roman emperors assisted in reconstruction of the city, particularly Claudius after whom the grateful citizens added Caesarea to its name as indicated by an inscription referring to "The Council and People of the Caesarean Cibyrites" (Καισαρεων Κιβυρατων ἡ βουλη και ὁ δημος) and by the legend "Caesareans" (Καισαρεων), which appears on some of the coins of Cibyra. They also initiated games and started dating a new era from the year of 25 AD.

Hadrian, while travelling through the eastern provinces of the Empire, arrived at Kibyra in 129 and granted many privileges to its inhabitants.

Cibyra was the centre of a conventus (an assize district), which contained twenty-five cities, according to Pliny the Elder. Laodicea on the Lycus was one of the chief cities of this Conventus.

The poet Horace mentions Cibyra as a place of great trade William Smith notes that its position does not seem very favourable for commerce, since it is neither on the sea nor on a great road, and suggests that the city might have exported grain of the Indus valley. Iron ore was plentiful in Cibyratis and a peculiarity was that its iron was easily cut with a chisel, or other sharp tool.

Two artists of Cibyra were more famous for their knavery than for their artistic skill.

Another earthquake struck in 417 and the city could not all be rebuilt. The last residents left the city in the 8th century for the settlement of Horzum now known as Gölhisar.

== Archaeological remains ==
The ruins cover the crest of a hill between 300 and 400 feet above the level of the plain. The stone for the buildings is limestone from the neighbourhood. There are no traces of city walls.

One of the chief buildings is a theatre in fine preservation: the diameter is 266 feet. The seats command a view of the Cibyratic plain, and of the mountains towards the Milyas. On the platform near the theatre are the ruins of several large buildings supposed to be temples, some of the Doric and others of the Corinthian order.

=== Odeon ===
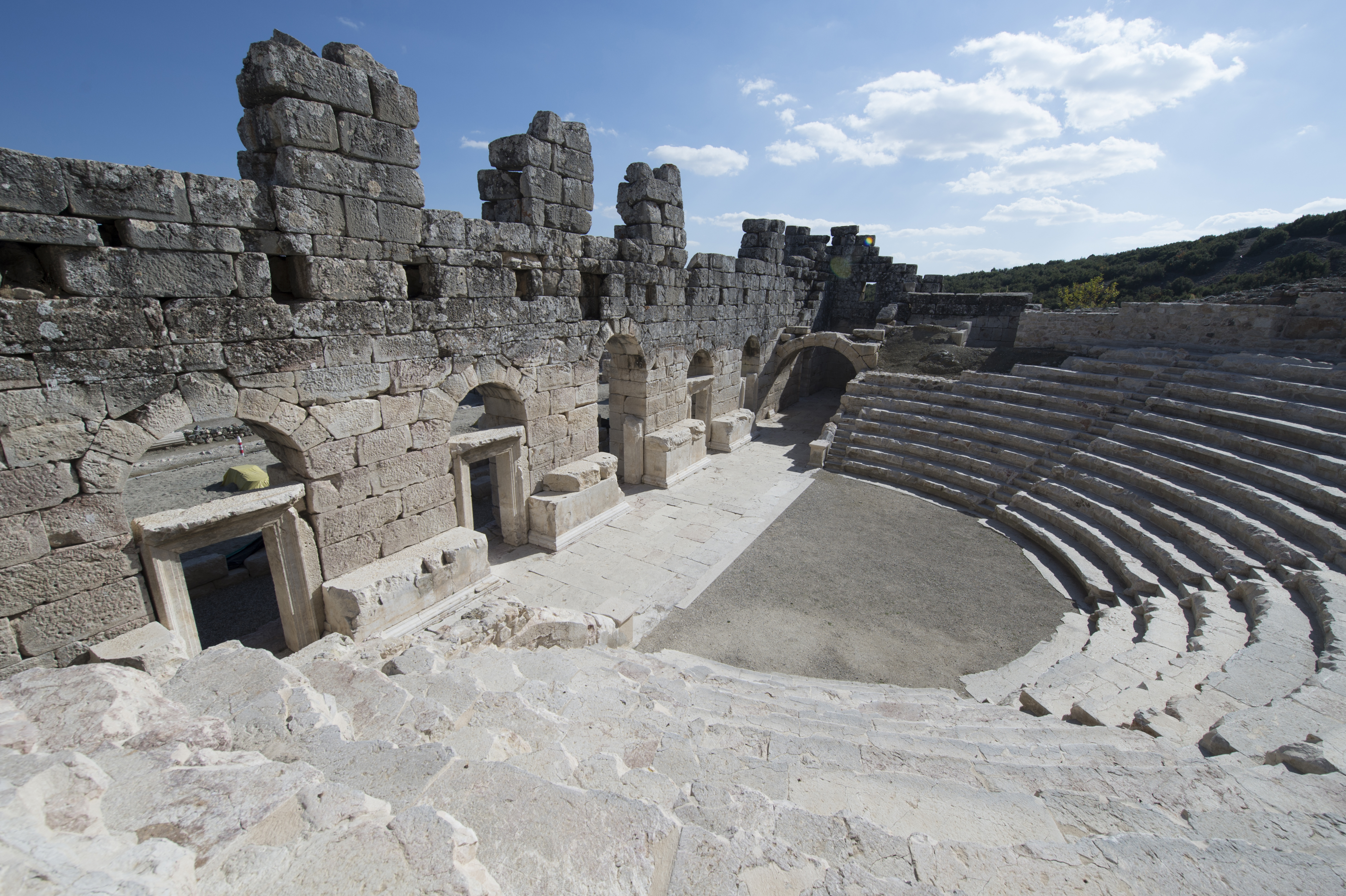
Odeon of Kibyra

The Odeon or music theatre is on the densely occupied southwest corner of the hill and had an orchestra with a Medusa mosaic floor, unlike any other in the world.

From text written on the mosaic floors in front of the odeon, the building was first built in the second half of 2nd c. AD for the city council assembly (Bouleuterion) but shortly afterwards, a stage (skena) was added to the building to make it into a theatre and a court room for the law centre of Asia Minor in the Imperial Roman Period, where important trials were held. The facade was covered with marble. Coloured marble columns and marble cladding decorated the facade of the stage. The orchestra floor was 9.80 X 5.80 m and was covered with very finely cut white, red, purple and gray marble slabs in opus sectile. In the centre of the orchestra was an exquisite Medusa.

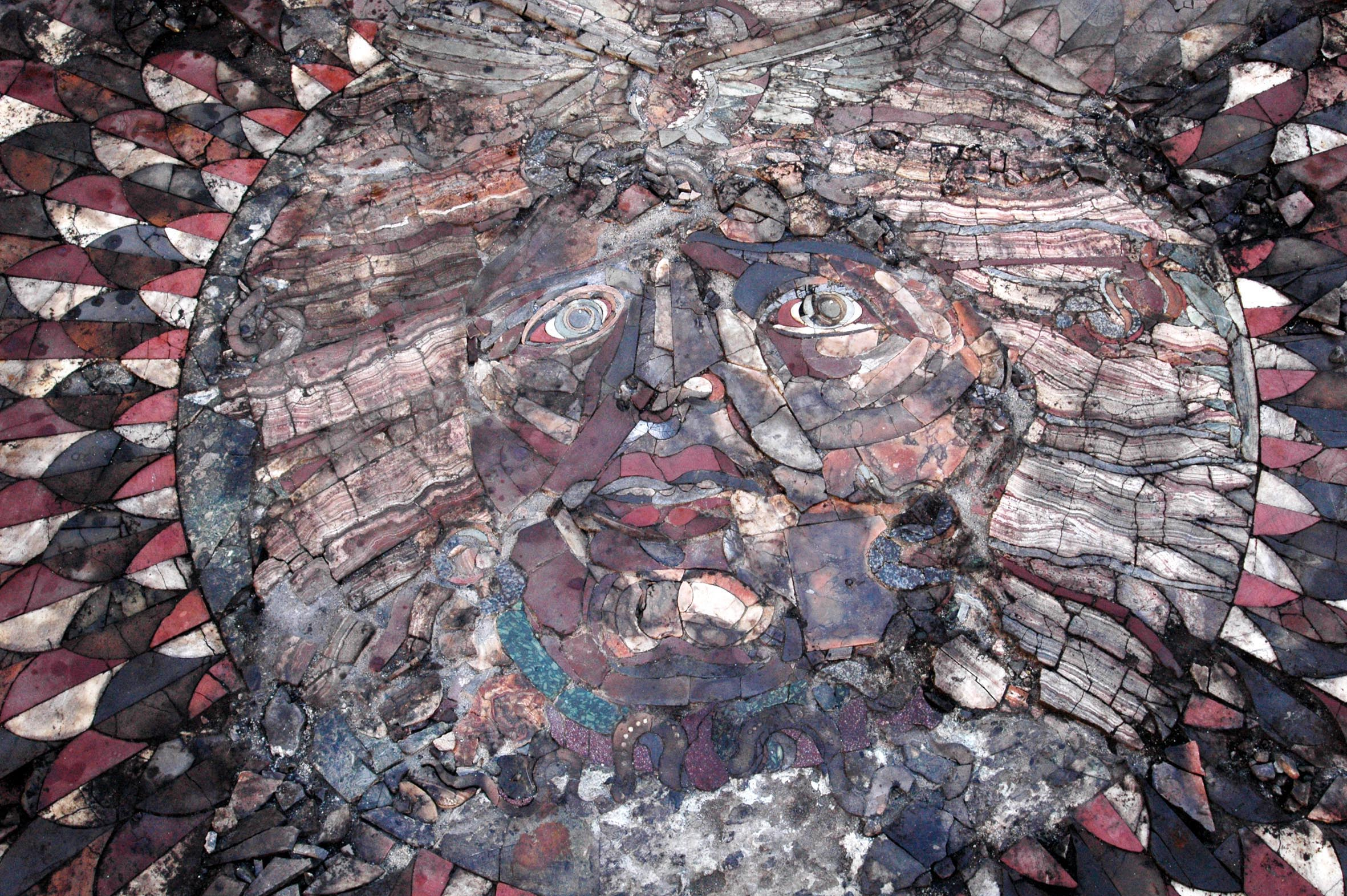
Medusa head mosaic

The proskena facade facing the audience was made of thin coloured marble plates decorated with motifs on the doors and columns. A stoa in front of the odeon has nine columns and a mosaic floor whose text records its construction year as 249-254 AD. The mosaic was sponsored by Aurelius Sopatros and the Klaudius Theodoros brothers.

=== Stadium ===
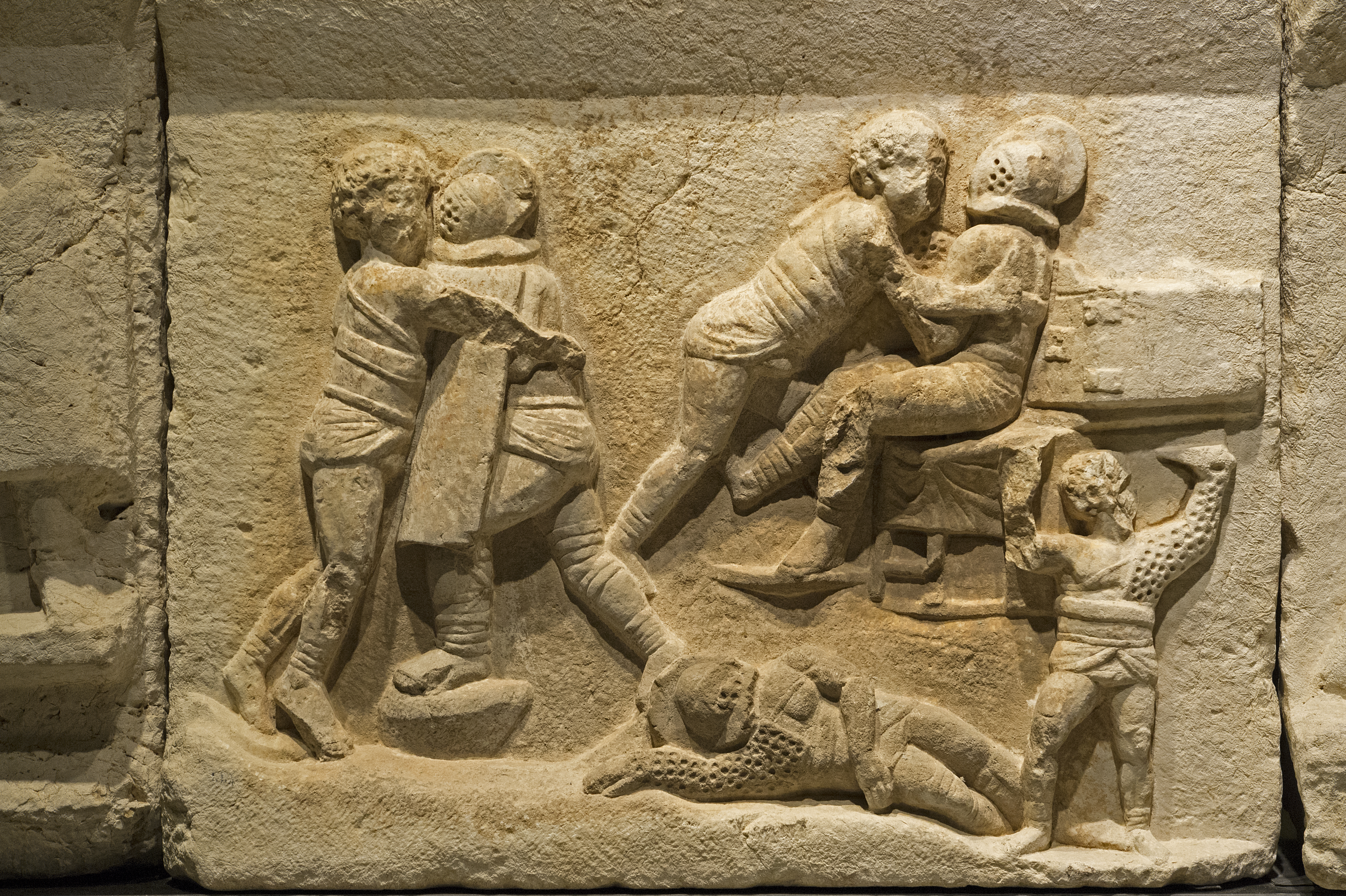
Gladiatorial scene (Burdur Museum)

The stadium, 650 feet in length and 80 in breadth, is at the lower extremity of the ridge on which the city stands.

It was used not only for races, but also for gladiator fights as indicated by the extensive gladiator friezes discovered.

The hillside was partly excavated to make room for it; and on the side formed out of the slope of the hill were ranged 21 rows of seats, which at the upper extremity of the stadium turned so as to make a theatre-like termination. This part of the stadium is very perfect, but the seats on the hill side are much displaced by the shrubs that have grown up between them. The seats overlook the plain of Cibyra. The seats on the side opposite to the hill were marble blocks placed on a low wall built along the edge of the terrace, formed by cutting the side of the hill. Near the entrance to the stadium a ridge runs eastward, crowned by a paved way, bordered on each side by sarcophagi and sepulchral monuments. At the entrance to this avenue of tombs was a massive triumphal arch of Doric architecture, now in ruins.

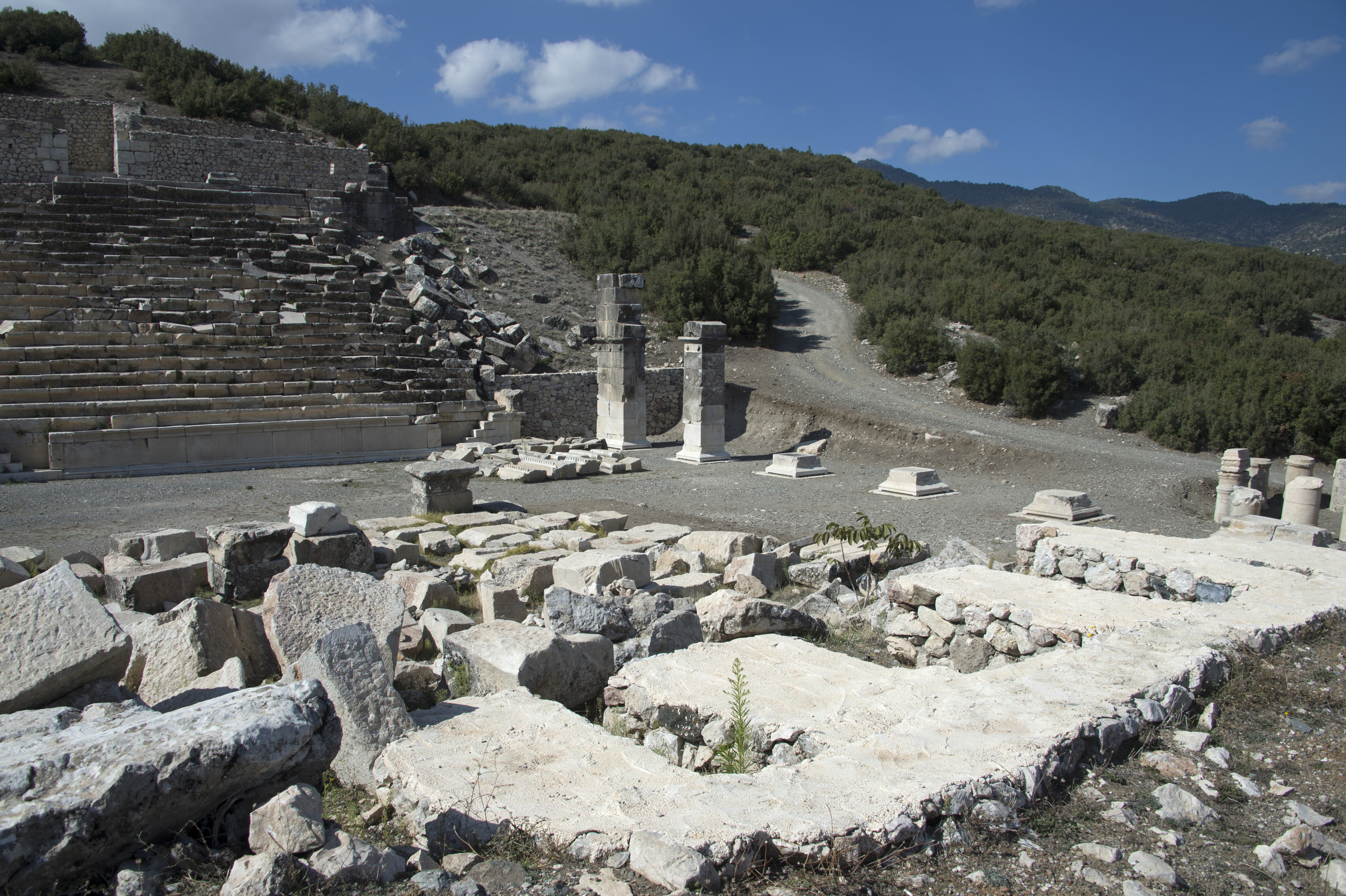
Kibyra Stadium end

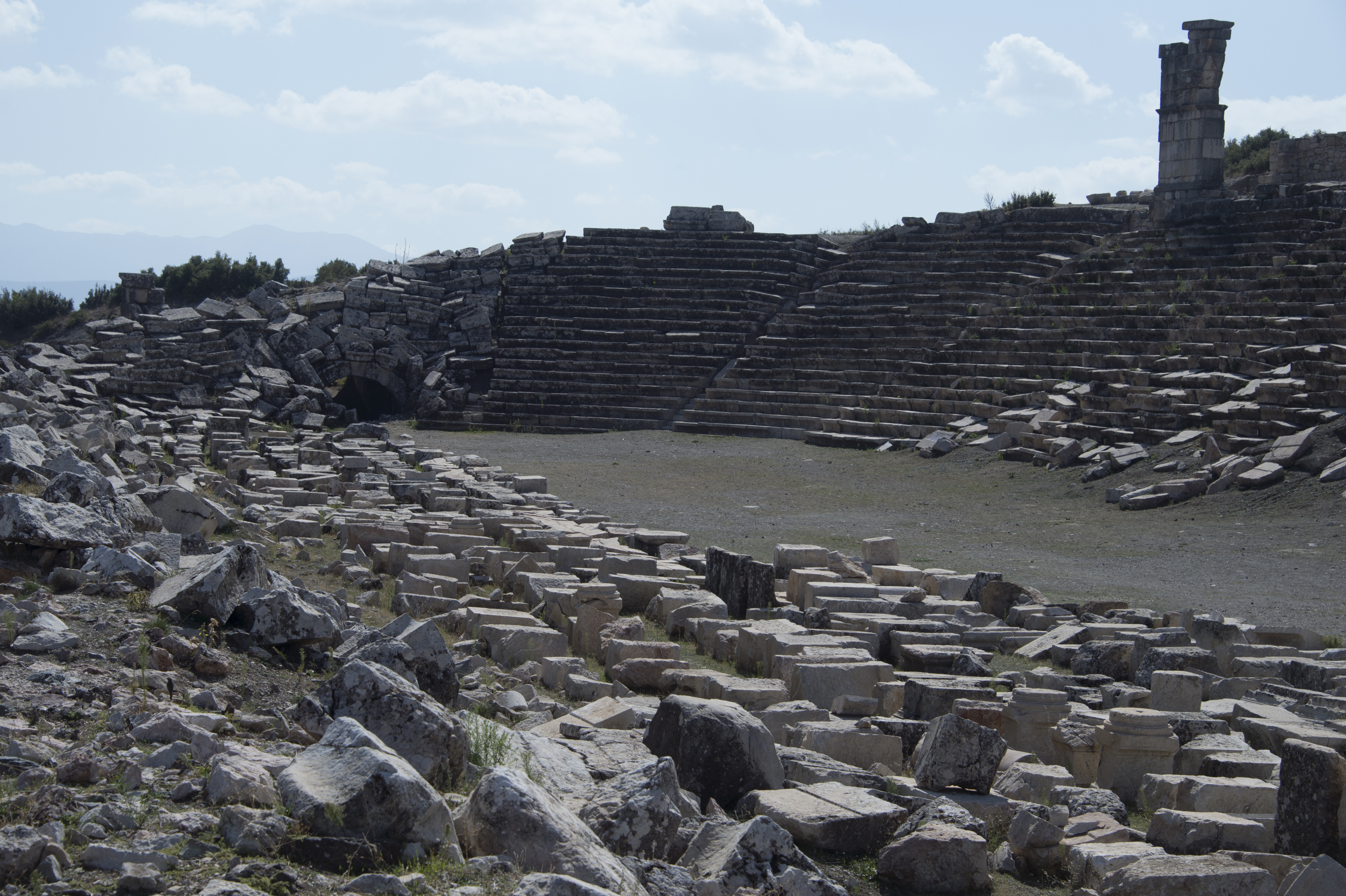
Kibyra Stadium General view

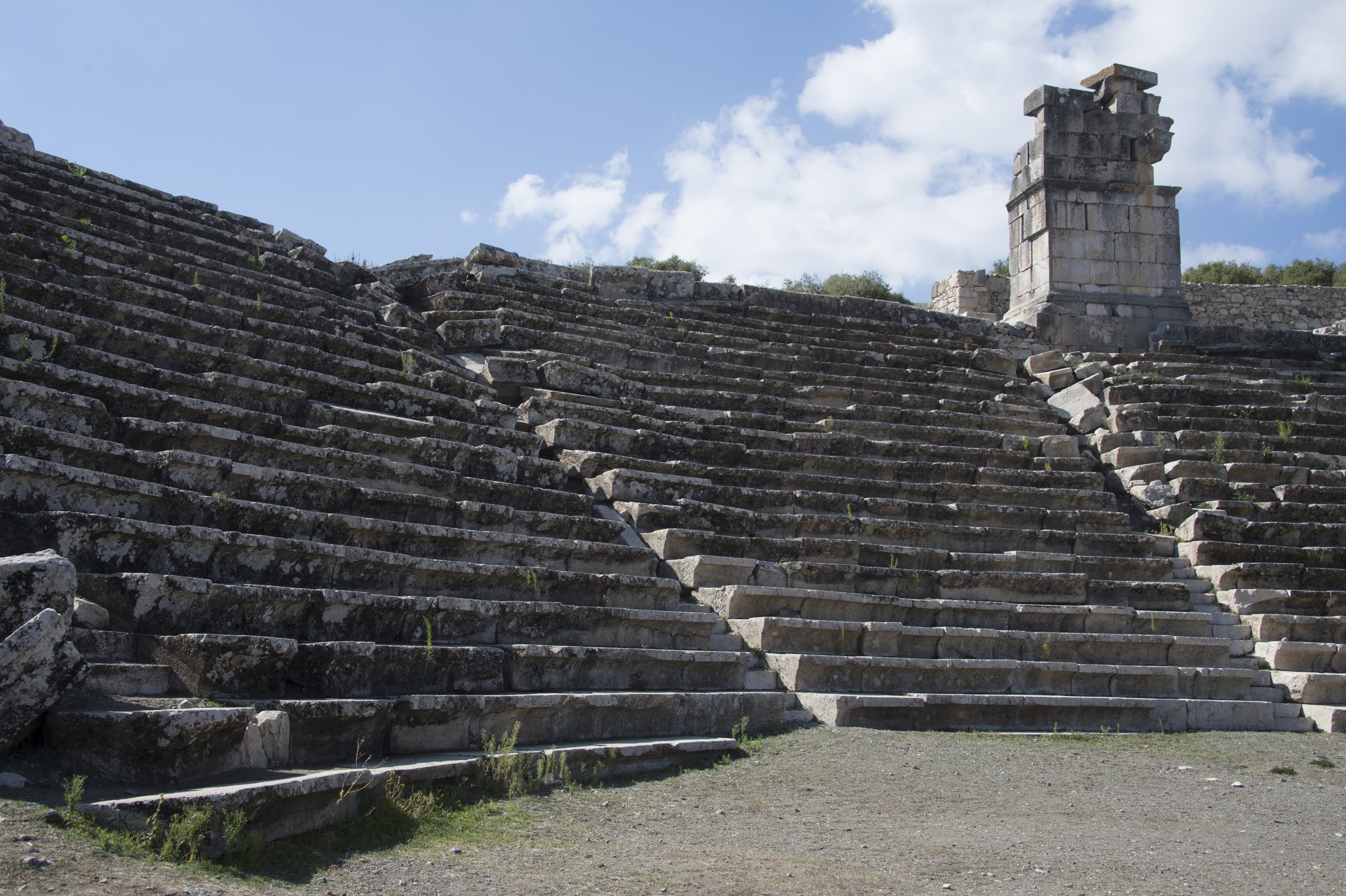
Kibyra Stadium

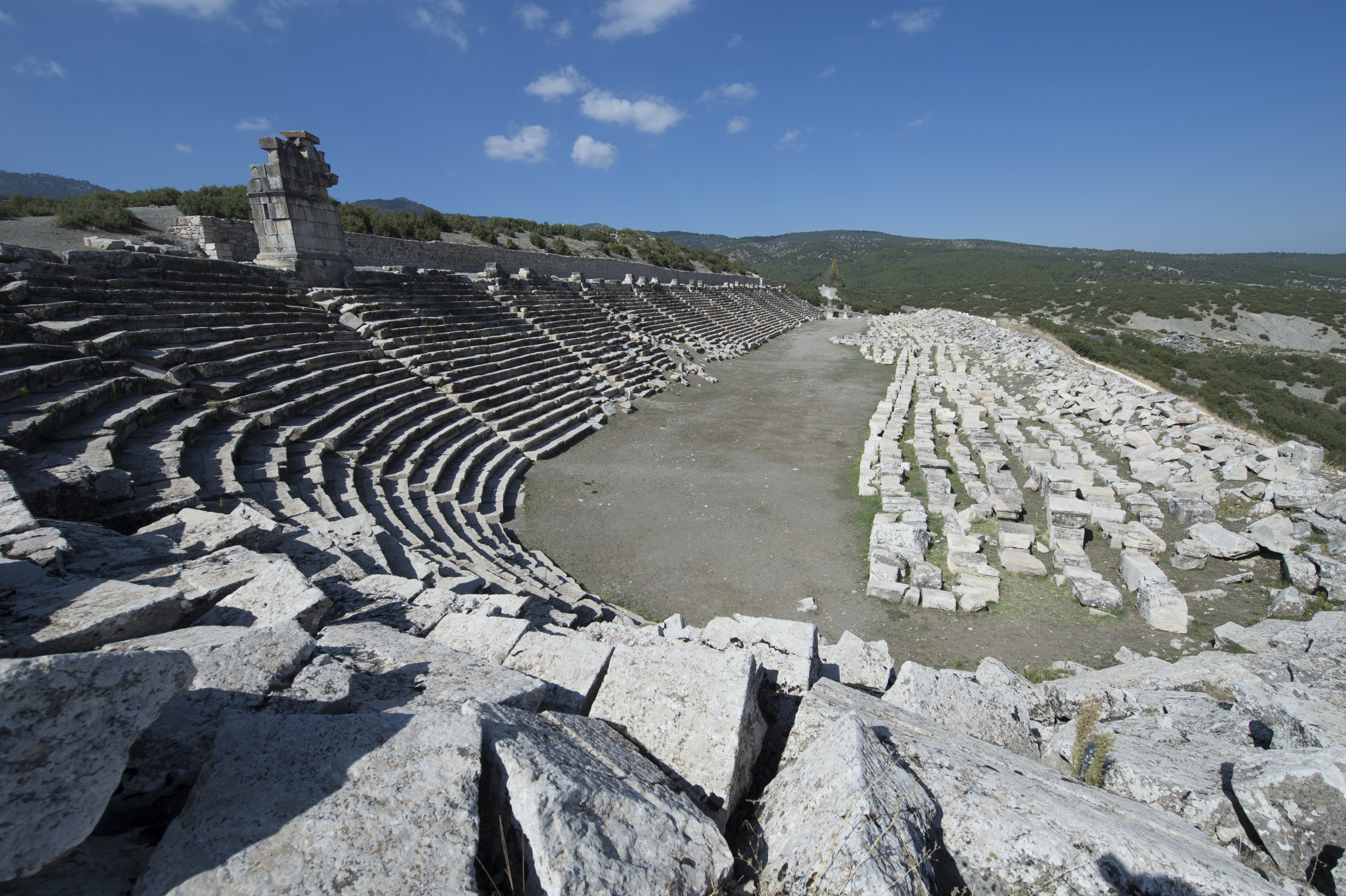
Kibyra Stadium from curved part

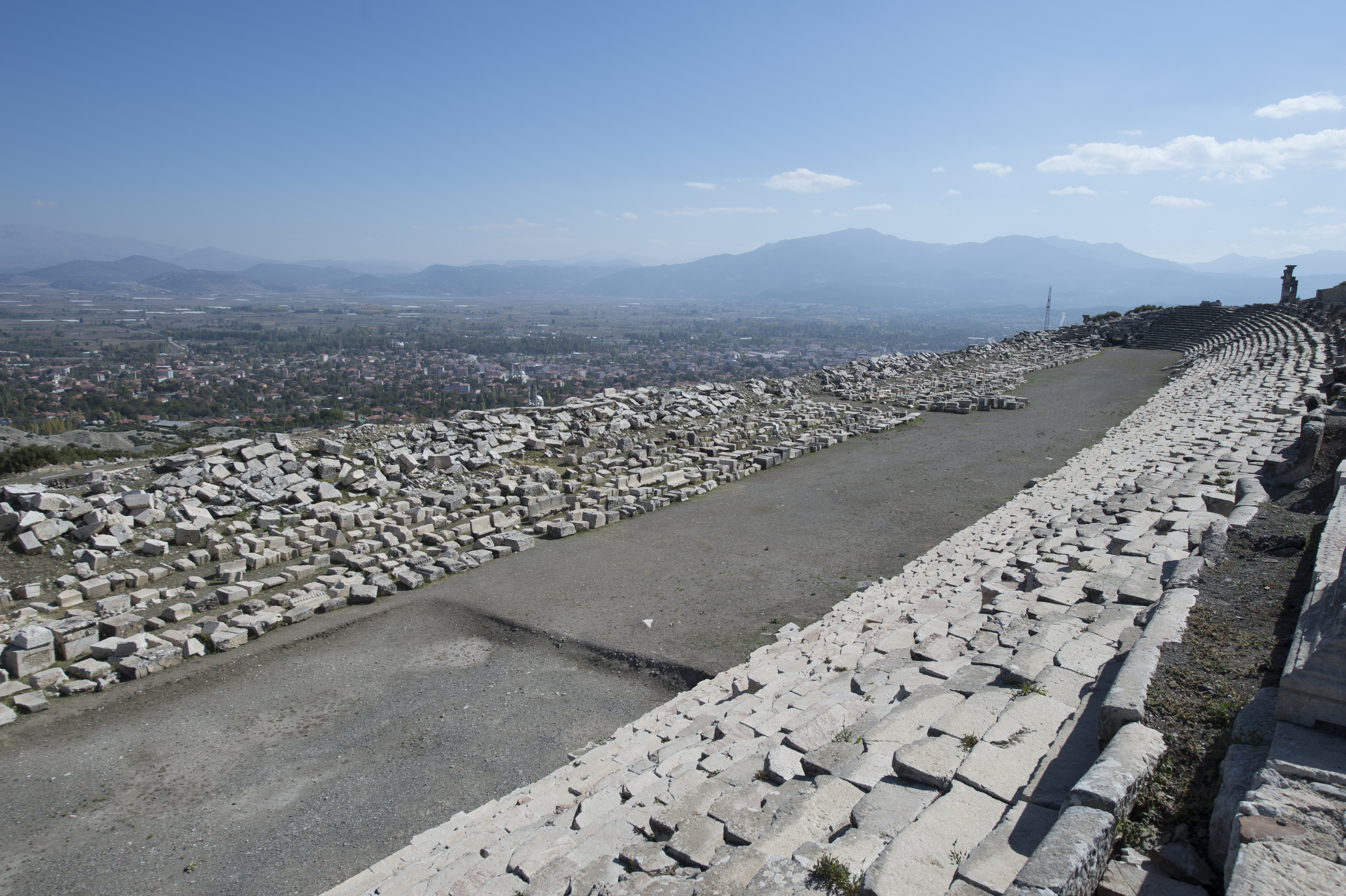
Kibyra Stadium view high side

=== Inscriptions ===
The inscriptions from the site are collected in IK Kibyra, volume 60 of the Inschriften Griechischer Städte aus Kleinasien series. That corpus contains 448 Greek and Latin inscriptions, ranging in date from the second century BC to Late Antiquity.

=== Statues ===
In 2019, archaeologists found a bust of Serapis and a statue of Asclepius. In the 2020 excavation season, another statue of Asclepius and the head of a bust of Serapis were found in Kibyra, date back to 2nd century A.D.

In 2026 remarkable statues of Hadrian and his wife Sabina were found as part of a collection that adorned the city gate.

=== Graves ===
In 2021, archaeologists found 30 graves in a basilica church. The researchers believe that many of them belonged to the important clergy of the city.

== Gallery ==
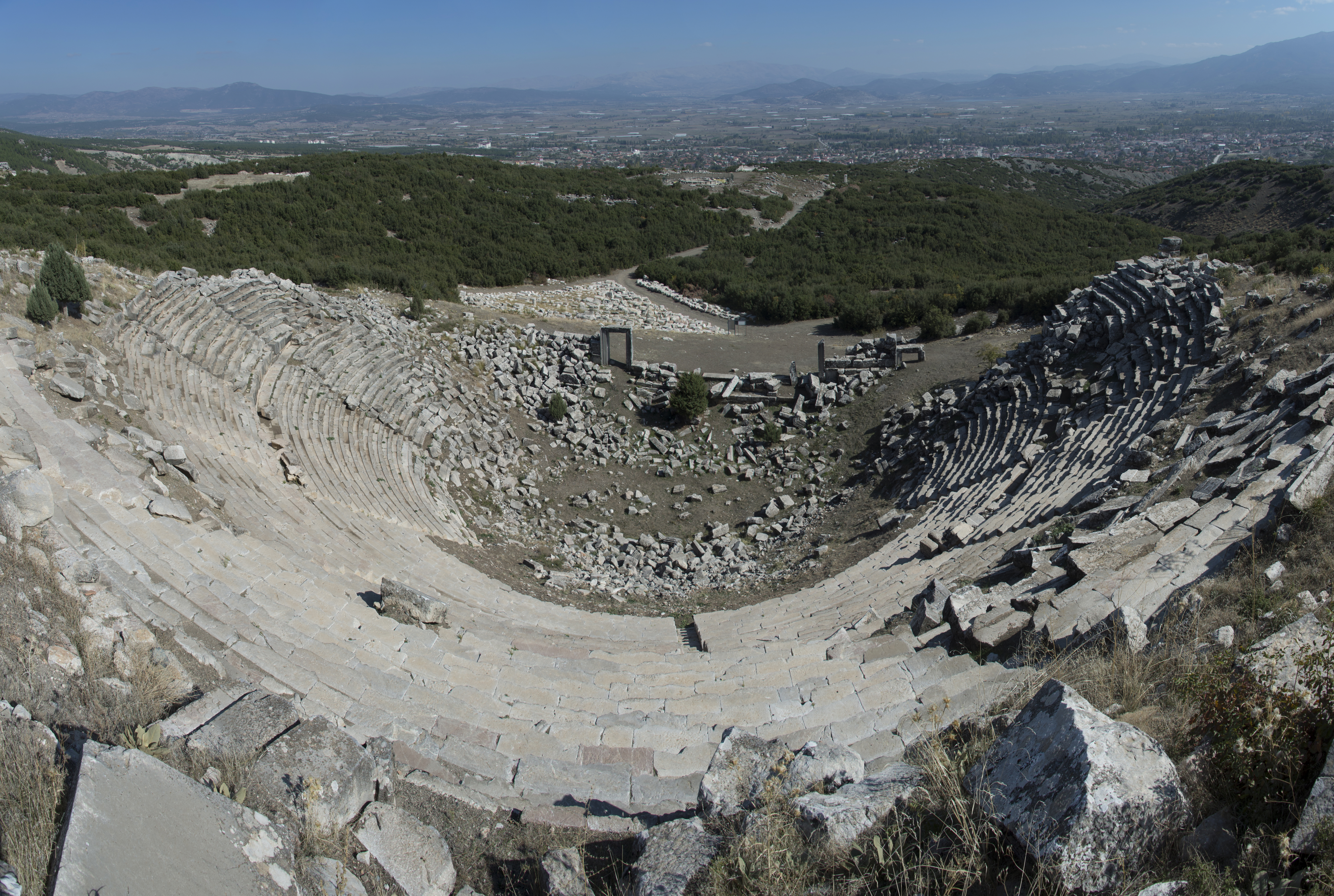
Kibyra Theatre from top

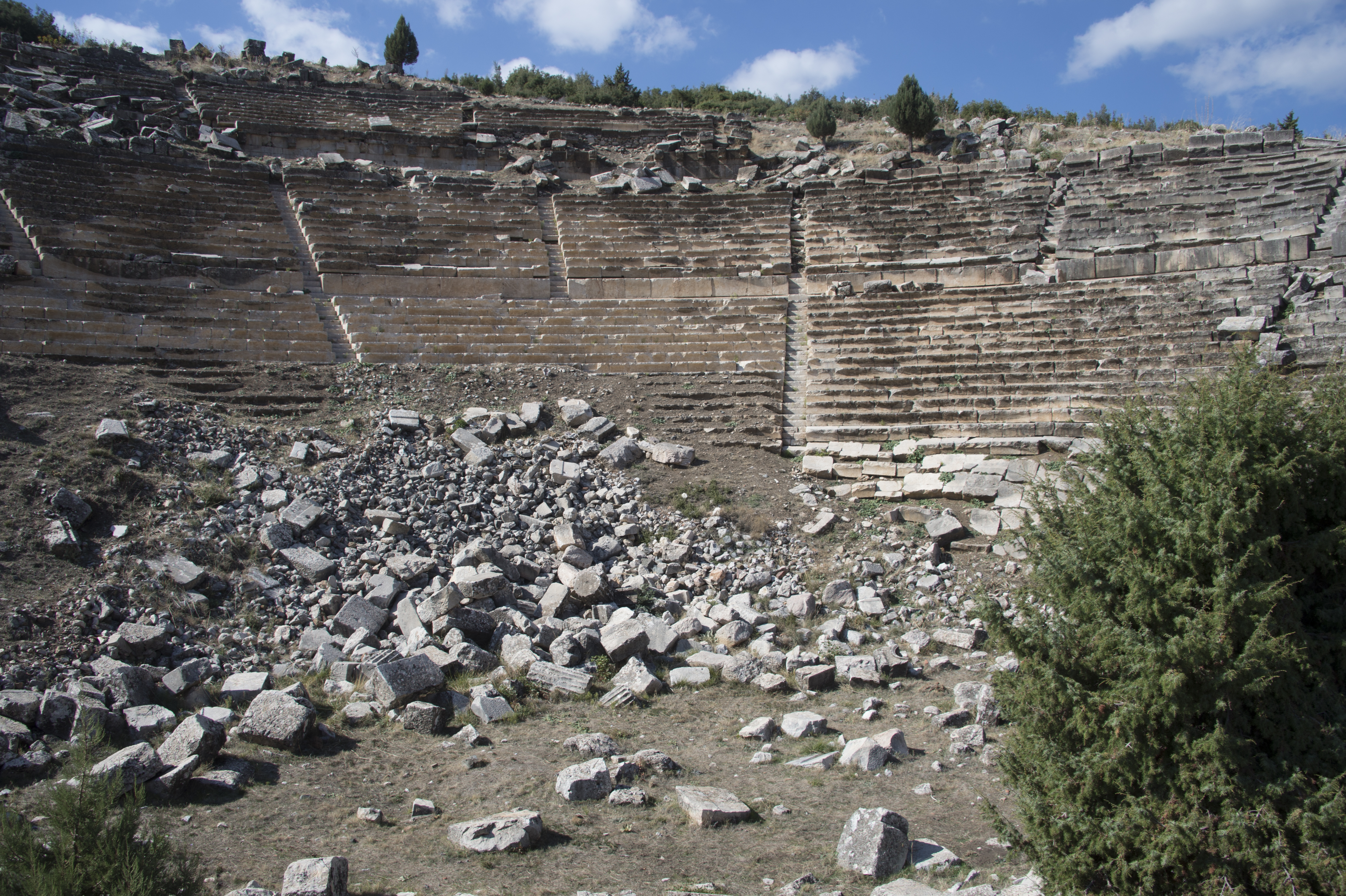
Kibyra Theatre from stage part

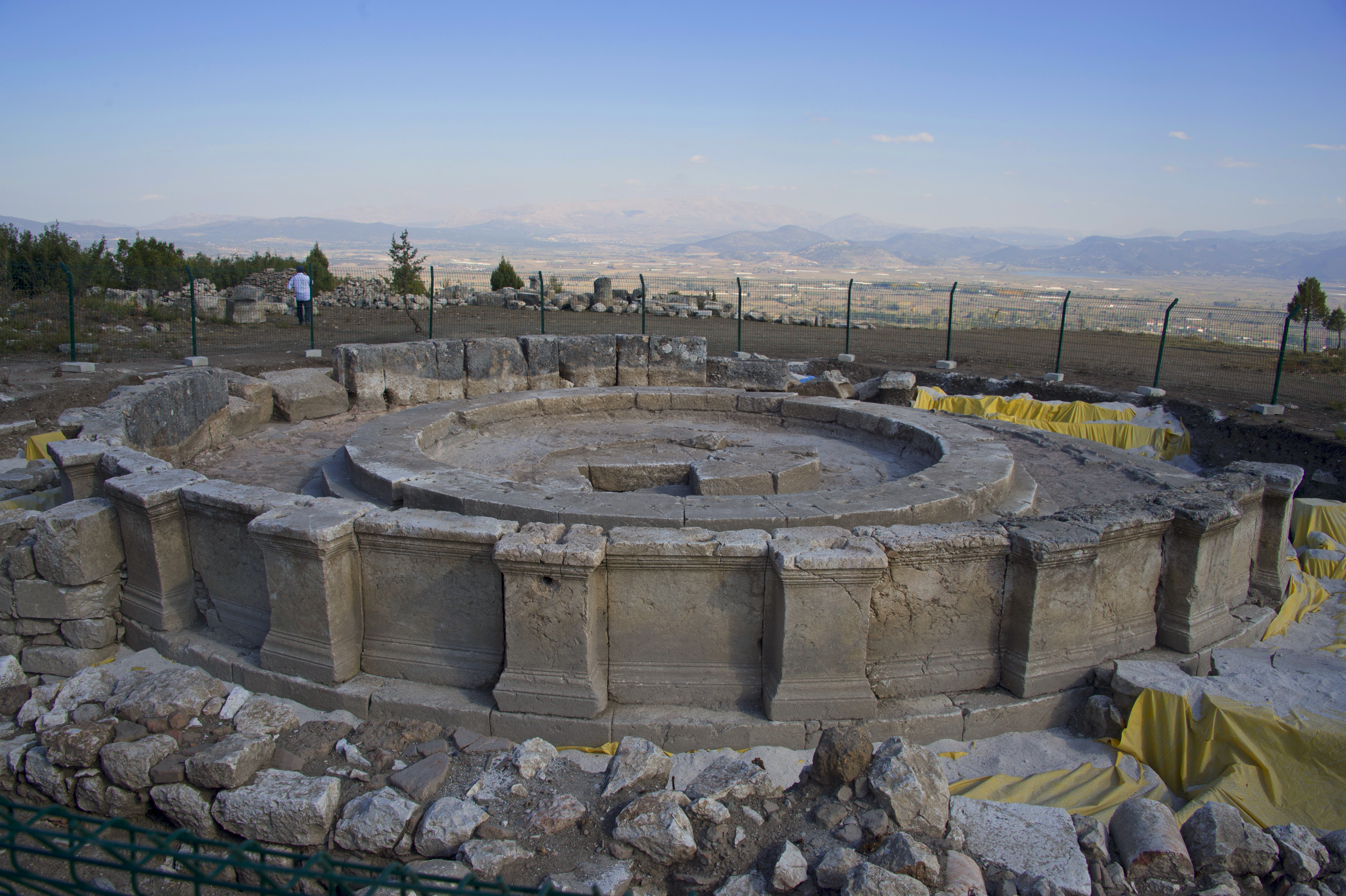
Kibyra Temple

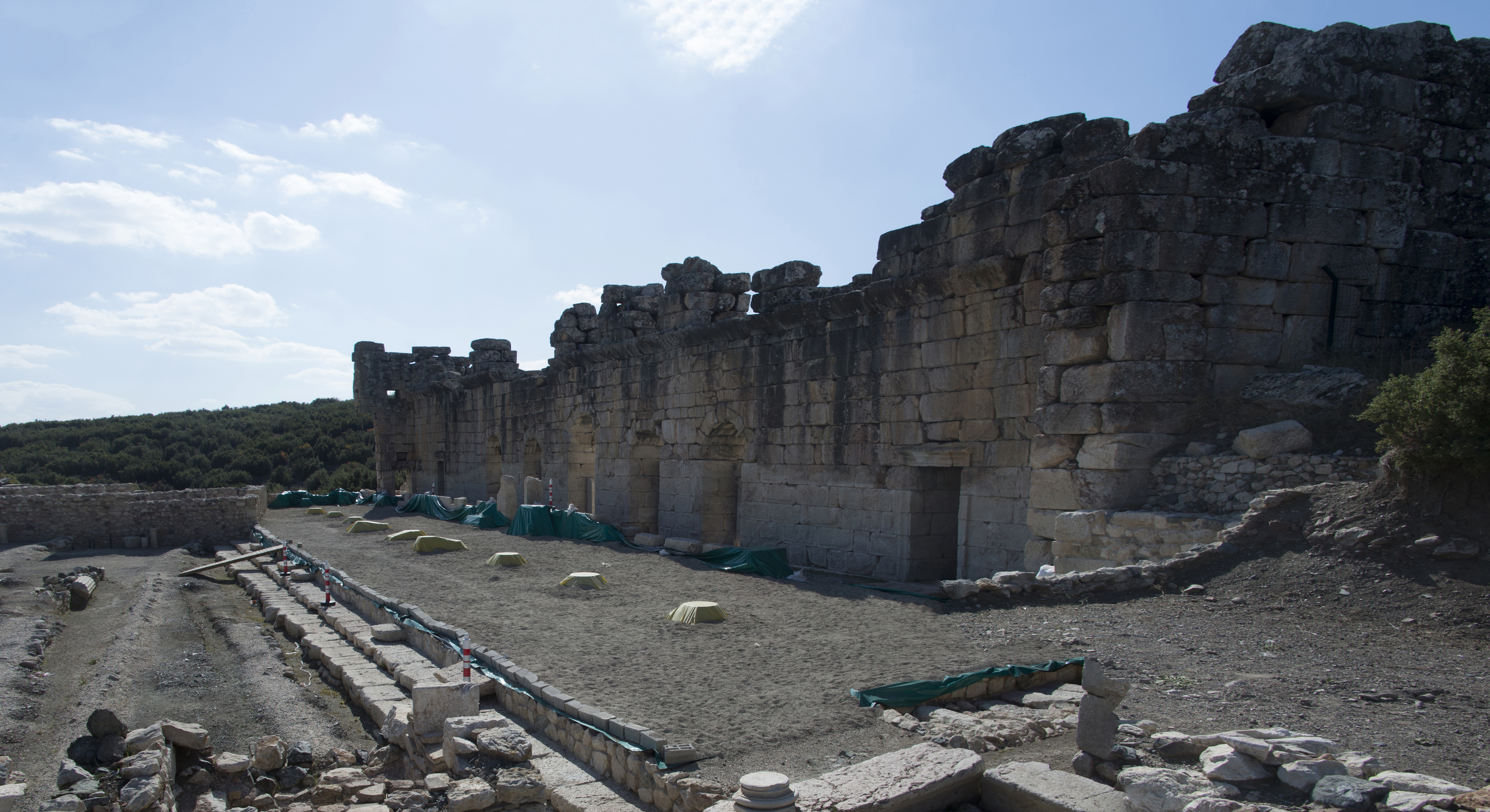
Kibyra Odeon from the outside

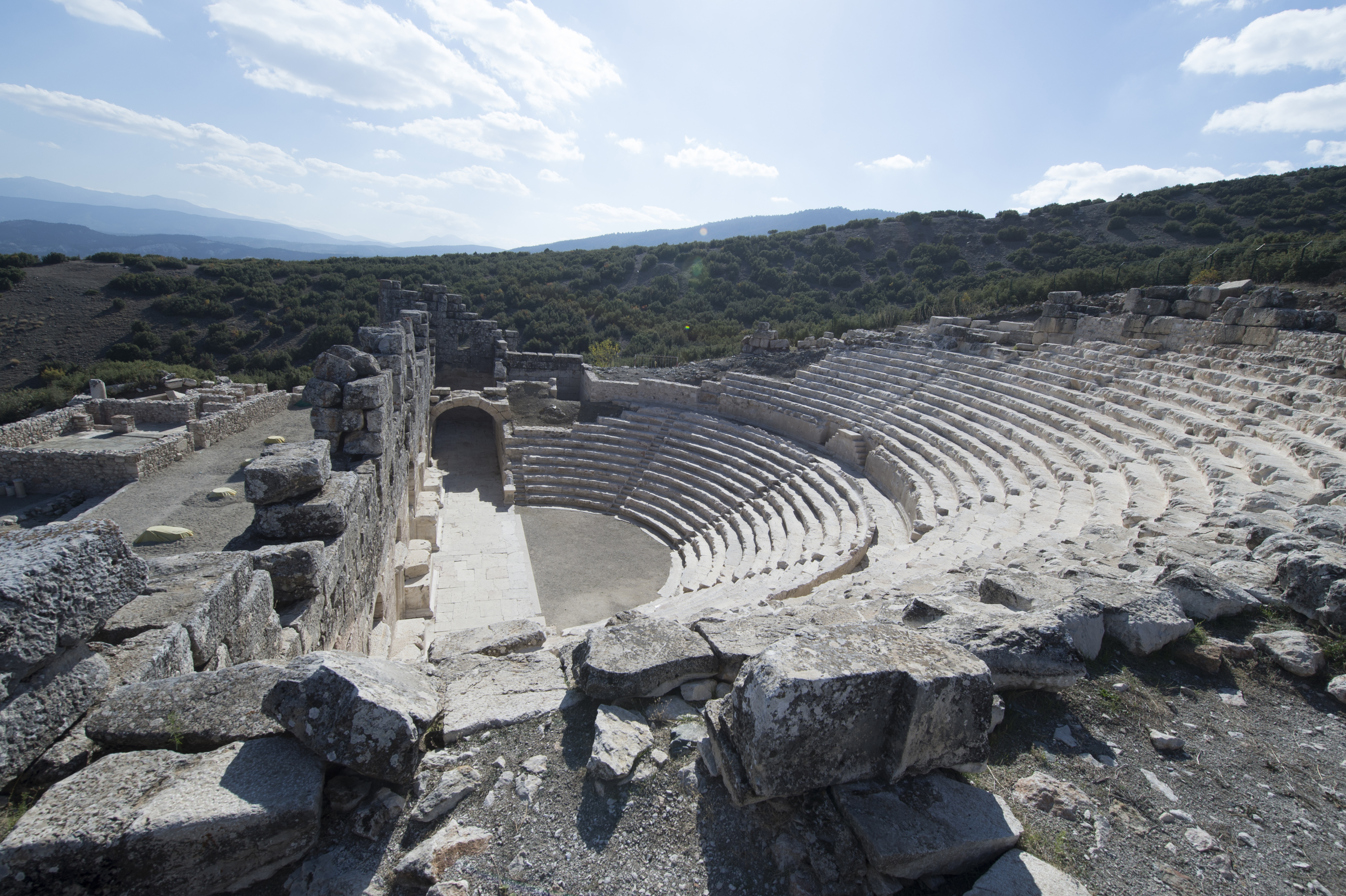
Kibyra Odeon inside

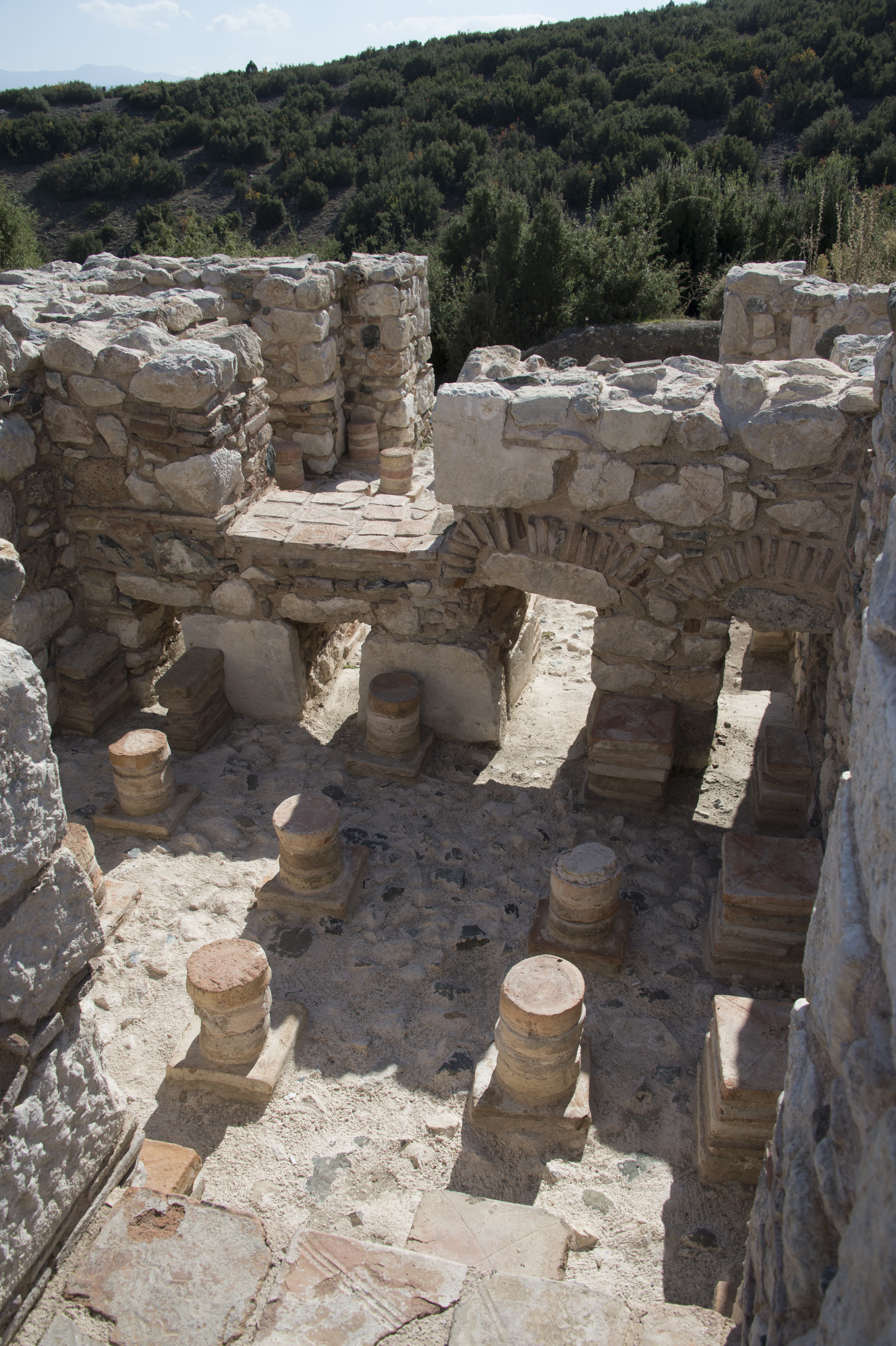
Kibyra Odeon Roman bath

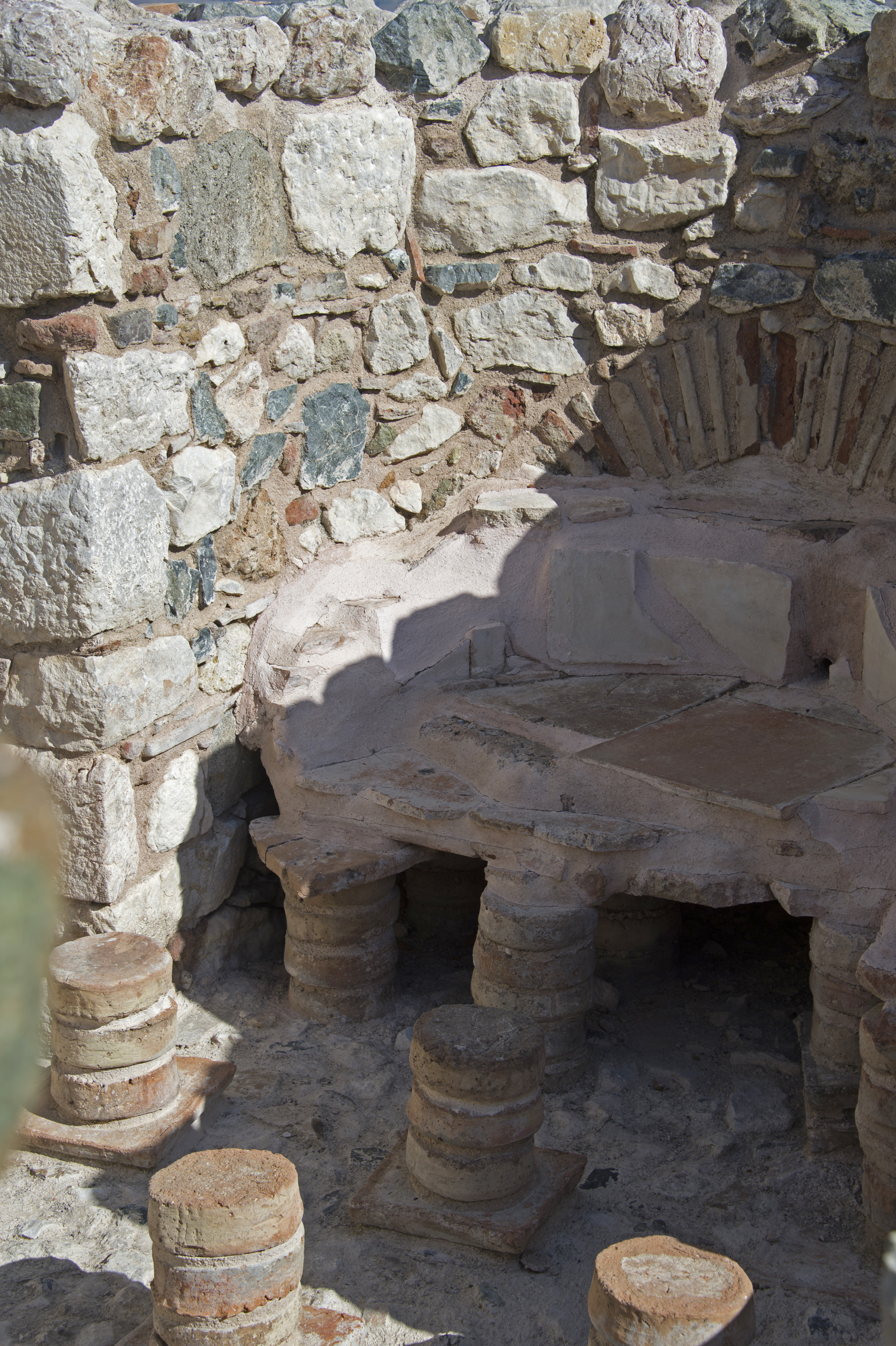
Kibyra Odeon Roman bath

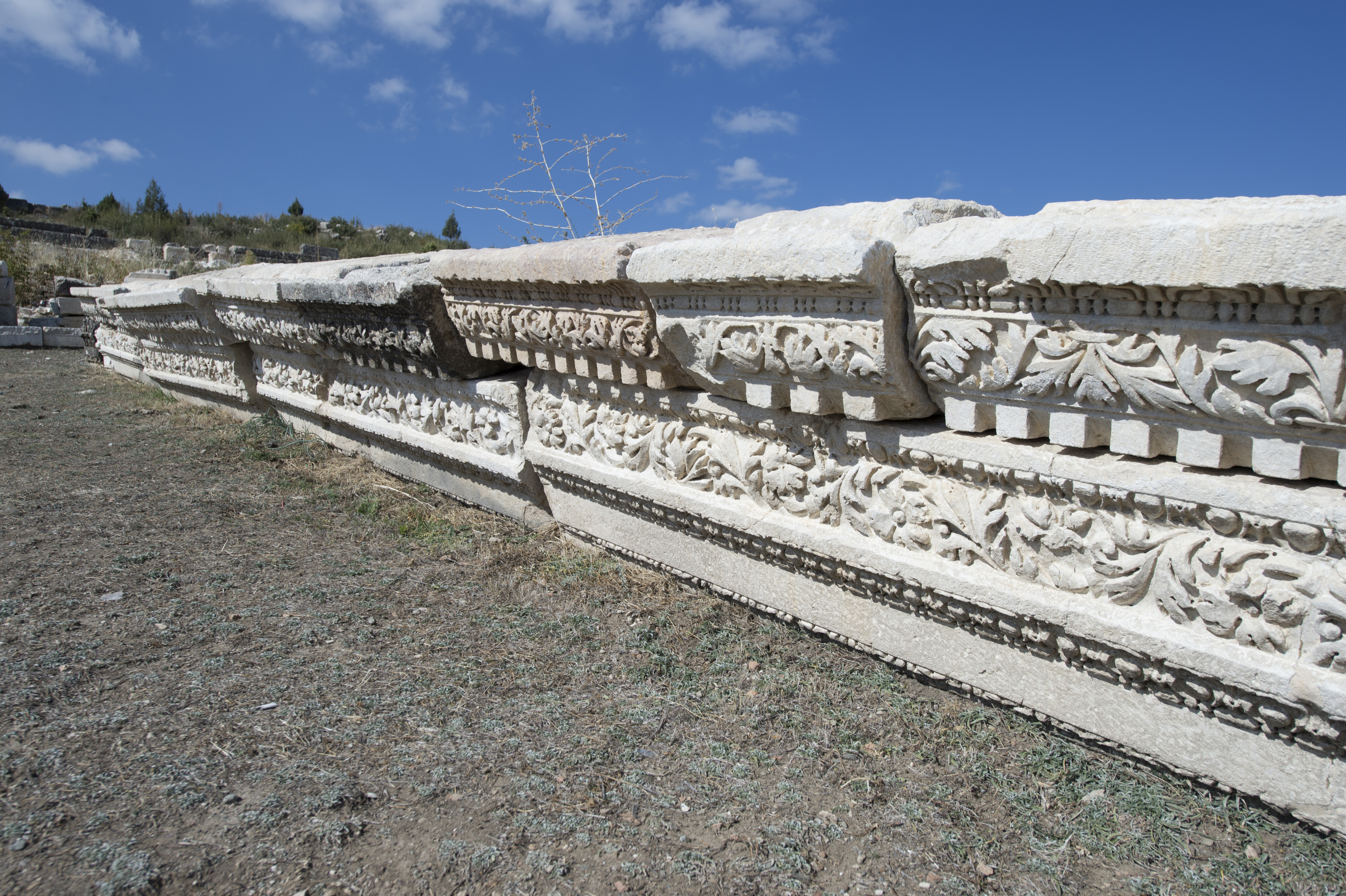
Kibyra Agora Frieze

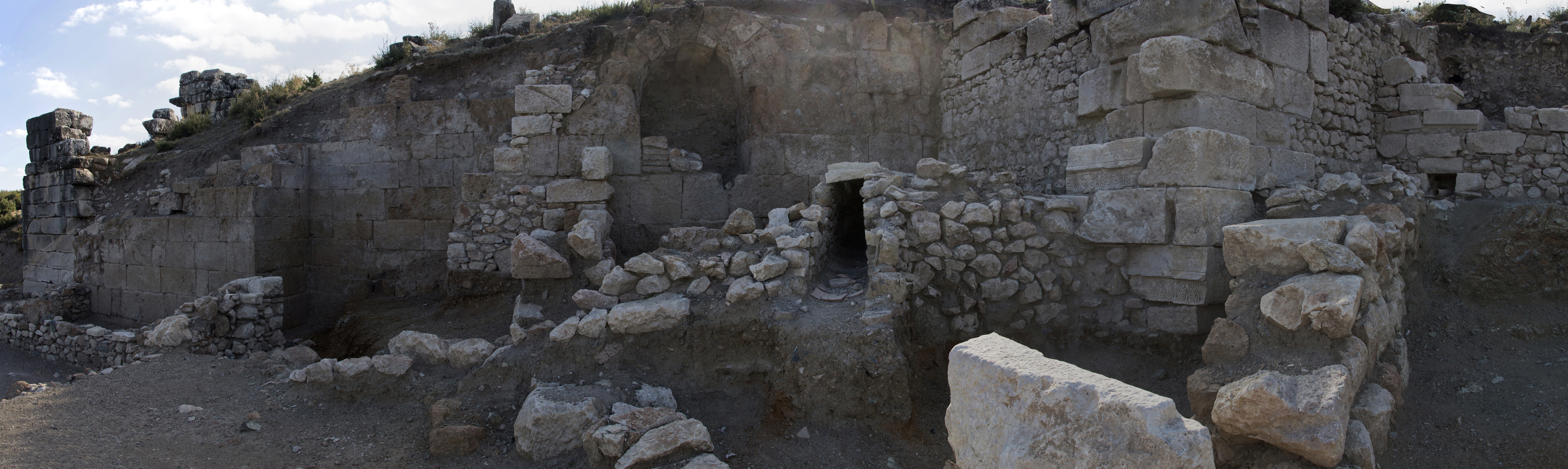
Kibyra Roman bath

== Bibliography ==
- Berns, Christof; Ali Ekinci, H. (2015). "Gladiatorial games in the Greek East: a complex of reliefs from Cibyra". Anatolian Studies. 65: 143–179. doi:10.1017/S0066154615000095. S2CID 130325531.
- Corsten, T. (2002). Die Inschriften von Kibyra. Bonn.
- Erkelenz, D. (1998). "Zur Provinzzugehorigkeit Kibyras in der romischen Kaiserzeit". Epigraphica Anatolica. 30: 81–95.
- Japp, Sarah (2009). "The local pottery production of Kibyra". Anatolian Studies. 59: 95–128. doi:10.1017/S0066154600000910. S2CID 129577090.
- Milner, N. P. (1998). An epigraphical survey in the Kibyra-Olbasa region conducted by A.S. Hall. London: British Institute of Archaeology at Ankara. ISBN 9781912090624.
