= Balbura (Lycia) =

Human settlement in southwestern Anatolia

Coordinates: 36°57′19″N 29°34′52″E

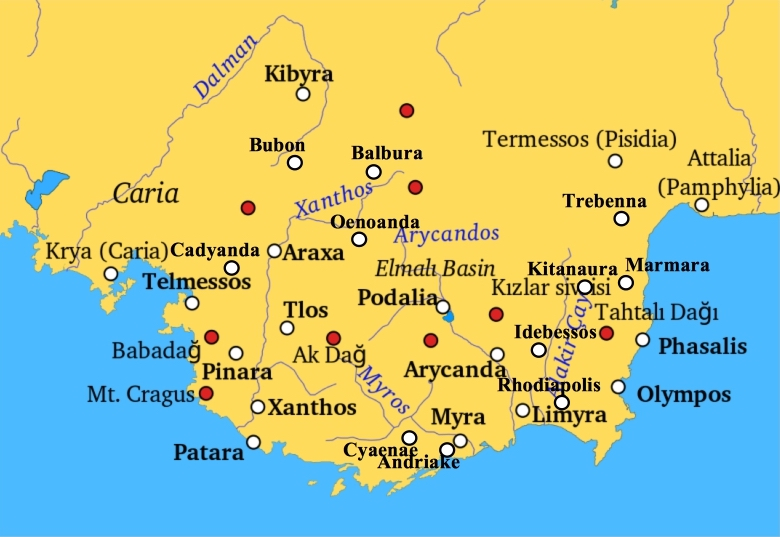
Cities of ancient Lycia

Balbura or Balboura (Ancient Greek: Βάλβουρα) was a town of ancient Lycia, the site of which is at Çölkayiği. The site was brought to wider attention in the 1840s by Richard Hoskyn and Edward Forbes reporting on their travels in Anatolia.

== The Site ==
The acropolis hill is about 90 metres above the plain of Katara. The ruins occupy a considerable space on two hills on both sides of a stream.

The city wall still stands on the northern hill up to 2.4 m high, with a stretch of polygonal masonry 1.8 m thick.

There are two theatres; one is on the south side of the acropolis hill, and the other is in a hollow which formed the cavea, in the front of the mountain on the south side of the stream. The former is of unusual construction as the cavea is interrupted in the centre by a large block of natural rock with the ends of the rows of seats attached.

A triple-arched gate is dedicated to Septimius Severus and Geta. There are also remains of several temples and of Christian churches.

== History ==
Balbura was a member of a tetrapolis headed by Kibyra, formed in the 2nd c. BC and dissolved 82 BC, after which it was attached to the Lycian League.

Balbura was part of a district called Cabalia, named Cabalis by Strabo with two other cities, Bubon and Oenoanda.

The demonym Βαλβουρεύς occurs on two inscriptions at Katara.

Balbura minted coins during the Hellenistic Age and during the reign of Caligula.

== Bishopric ==
Balbura was a bishopric early, a suffragan of the metropolitan see of Myra, the capital of the Roman province of Lycia. The names of four of its bishops are recorded in extant documents. Hermaeus was at the First Council of Constantinople in 381. Philippus took part the Council of Chalcedon in 351. Nicolaus was a signatory of the protest letter that the bishops of the province of Lycia sent in 458 to Byzantine Emperor Leo I the Thracian over the killing of Proterius of Alexandria. Ioannes was a participant in the Photian Council of Constantinople (879).

No longer a residential bishopric, Balbura is today listed by the Catholic Church as a titular see.

== Balboura Survey ==
Between 1985 and 1993 an extensive archaeological survey, led by Jim Coulton, applied a wide range of methods to studying the topography and remains of the town and its rural hinterland. The results were published by the British Institute at Ankara in two volumes as The Balboura Survey.
