= Çamköy, Gölhisar =

Village in Turkey

Çamköy
- Village
- Location in Turkey
- Coordinates: 37.2597°N 29.5344°E
- Country: Turkey
- Province: Burdur
- District: Gölhisar
- Population (2021): 620
- Time zone: UTC+3 (TRT)

Çamköy is a village in the Gölhisar District of Burdur Province in Turkey. Its population is 620 (2021).
