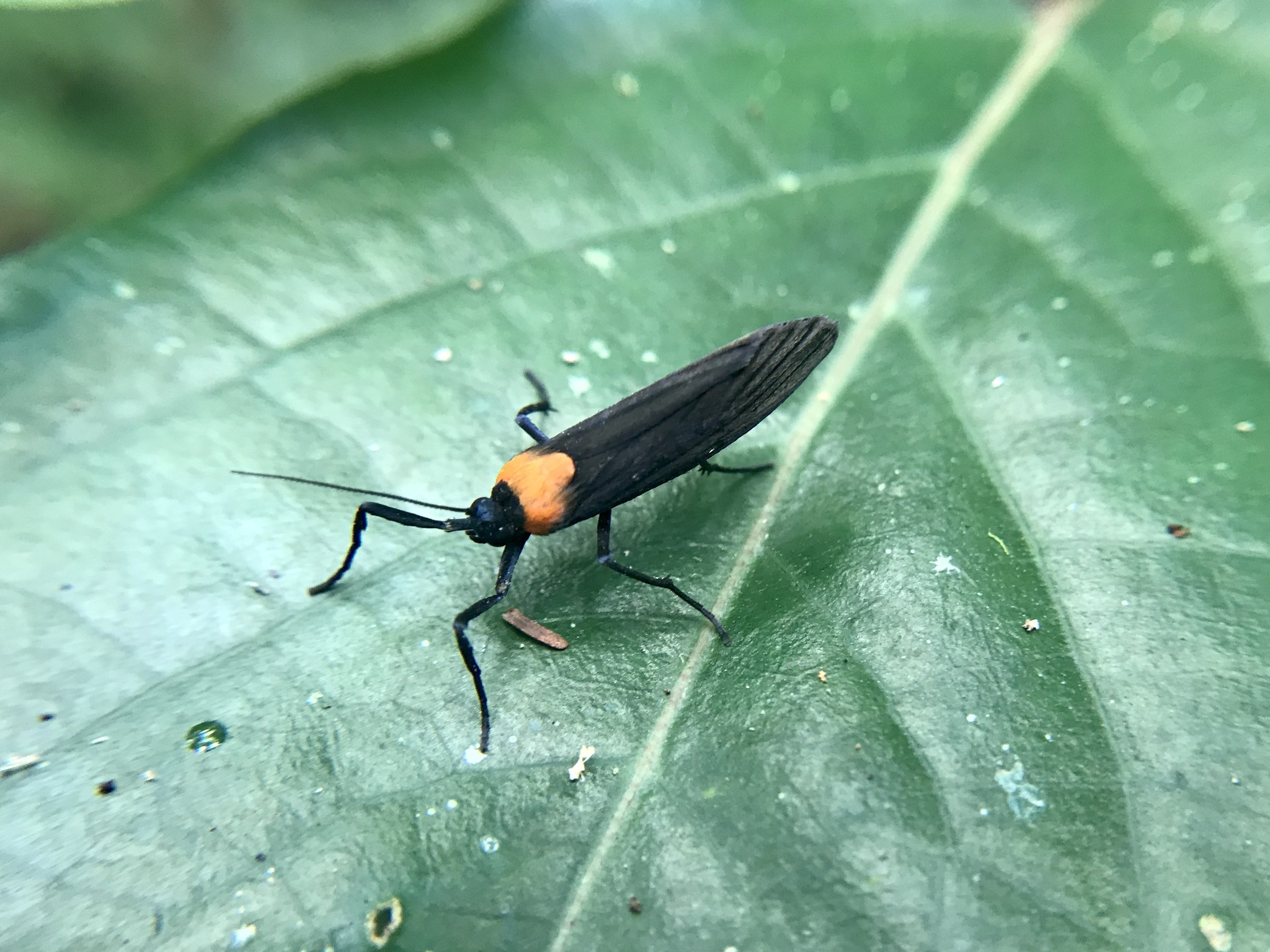

Scientific classification
- Domain: Eukaryota
- Kingdom: Animalia
- Phylum: Arthropoda
- Class: Insecta
- Order: Lepidoptera
- Superfamily: Noctuoidea
- Family: Erebidae
- Subfamily: Arctiinae
- Genus: Balbura
- Species: B. intervenata

Binomial name
- Balbura intervenata Schaus, 1911

= Balbura intervenata =

Species of moth

Balbura intervenata is a moth of the subfamily Arctiinae. It is found in Panama, Costa Rica and Honduras.
