= Balbura fasciata =

Scientific classification
- Domain: Eukaryota
- Kingdom: Animalia
- Phylum: Arthropoda
- Class: Insecta
- Order: Lepidoptera
- Superfamily: Noctuoidea
- Family: Erebidae
- Subfamily: Arctiinae
- Genus: Balbura
- Species: B. fasciata

Binomial name
- Balbura fasciata Schaus, 1911

Species of moth

Balbura fasciata is a moth of the subfamily Arctiinae. It is found in Central America, including Belize, Costa Rica, Guatemala, Mexico and Honduras.
