= Yeşildere, Gölhisar =

Village in Turkey

Yeşildere
- Village
- Location within Turkey
- Country: Turkey
- Province: Burdur
- District: Gölhisar
- Population (2021): 878
- Time zone: UTC+3 (TRT)

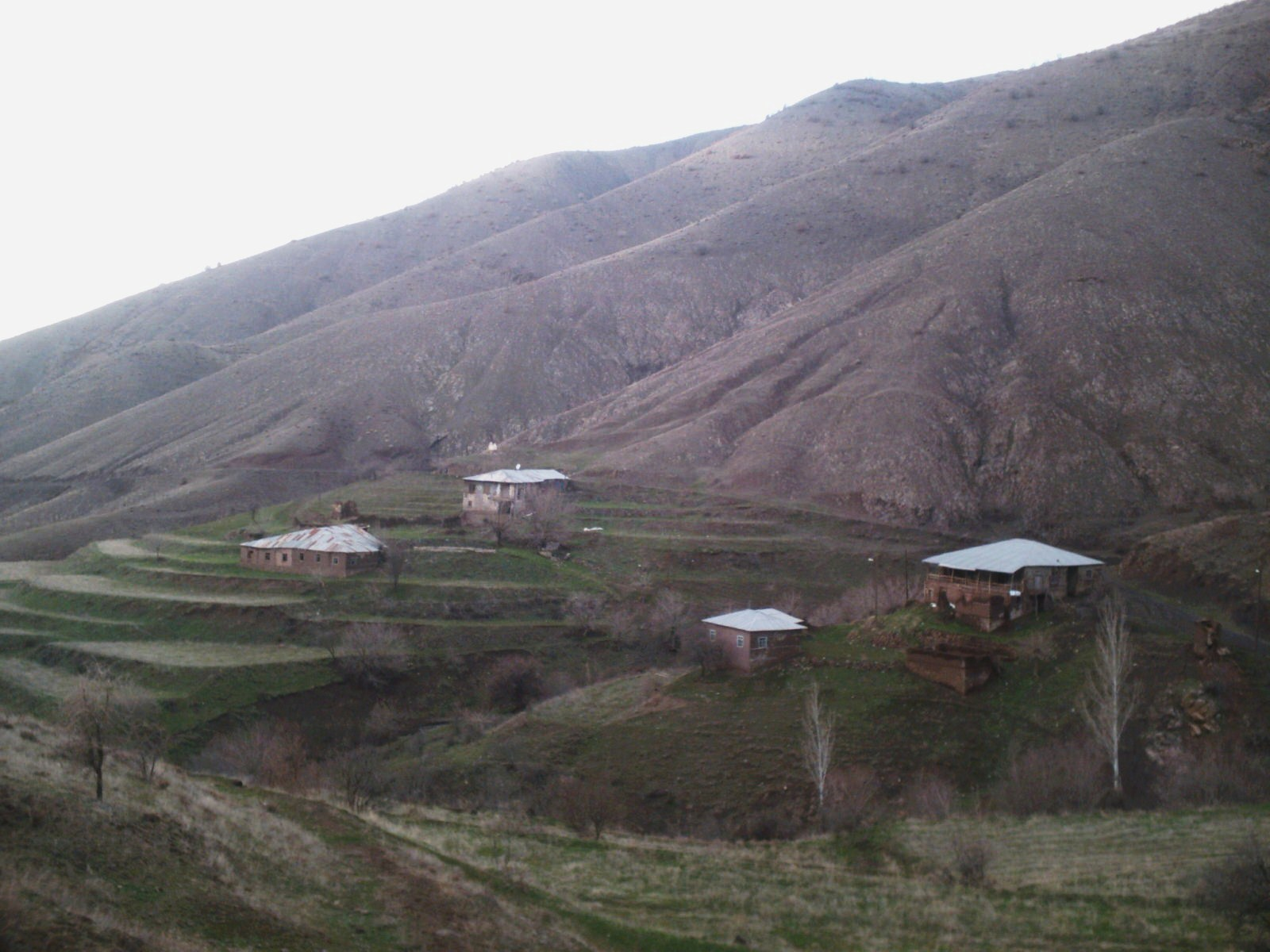
Yeşildere in 2010

Yeşildere is a village in the Gölhisar District of Burdur Province in Turkey. Its population is 878 (2021).
