= Asmalı, Gölhisar =

Village in Turkey

Asmalı
- Village
- Location in Turkey
- Coordinates: 37.0545°N 29.4885°E
- Country: Turkey
- Province: Burdur
- District: Gölhisar
- Area: 0.27 km^{2} (0.10 sq mi)
- Population (2021): 370
  - Density: 1,400/km^{2} (3,500/sq mi)
- Time zone: UTC+3 (TRT)

Asmalı is a village in the Gölhisar District of Burdur Province in Turkey. Its population is 370 (2021). The village to the east is Evciler.
