= Uylupınar, Gölhisar =

Village in Turkey

Uylupınar
- Village
- Location in Turkey
- Coordinates: 37°07′N 29°37′E
- Country: Turkey
- Province: Burdur
- District: Gölhisar
- Population (2021): 399
- Time zone: UTC+3 (TRT)

Uylupınar is a village in the Gölhisar District of Burdur Province in Turkey. Its population is 399 (2021).
