= Yusufça =

Kocaaliler
- Municipality
- Location in Turkey
- Coordinates: 37°12′N 29°32′E
- Country: Turkey
- Province: Burdur
- District: Gölhisar
- Elevation: 1,020 m (3,350 ft)
- Population (2021): 2,336
- Time zone: UTC+3 (TRT)
- Postal code: 15430
- Area code: 0248

Yusufça (former: Yusufçuk) is a town (belde) in the Bucak District, Burdur Province, Turkey. Its population is 2,336 (2021). It is situated in the northern slopes of Toros Mountains. The distance to Gölhisar is 8 kilometres (5.0 mi). According to town page, the settlement was founded in 1777 by Turkmens. The name Yusufçuk refers to a certain Yusuf who controlled the main water resource of the area in the 18th century. In 1972, Yusufçuk was declared a seat of township. Main economic sector is farming. Tomatoes, carrots and various other crops are produced. There is also some light industry in the town.
