= Sorkun, Gölhisar =

Village in Turkey

Sorkun
- Village
- Country: Turkey
- Province: Burdur
- District: Gölhisar
- Population (2021): 132
- Time zone: UTC+3 (TRT)

Sorkun is a village in the Gölhisar District of Burdur Province in Turkey. Its population is 132 (2021).
