= Hisarardı, Gölhisar =

Village in Turkey

Hisarardı
- Village
- Location in Turkey
- Coordinates: 37°5′26″N 29°36′46″E
- Country: Turkey
- Province: Burdur
- District: Gölhisar
- Population (2021): 260
- Time zone: UTC+3 (TRT)

Hisarardı is a village in the Gölhisar District of Burdur Province in Turkey. Its population is 260 (2021).
