= İbecik, Gölhisar =

Village in Turkey

İbecik
- Village
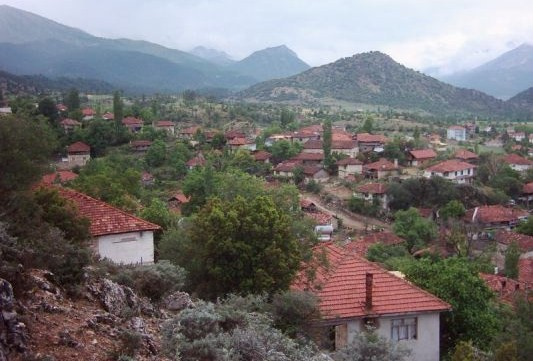

- Location within Turkey
- Coordinates: 36.9856°N 29.4118°E
- Country: Turkey
- Province: Burdur
- District: Gölhisar
- Population (2021): 675
- Time zone: UTC+3 (TRT)

İbecik is a village in the Gölhisar District of Burdur Province in Turkey. Its population is 675 (2021). Before the 2013 reorganisation, it was a town (belde).
