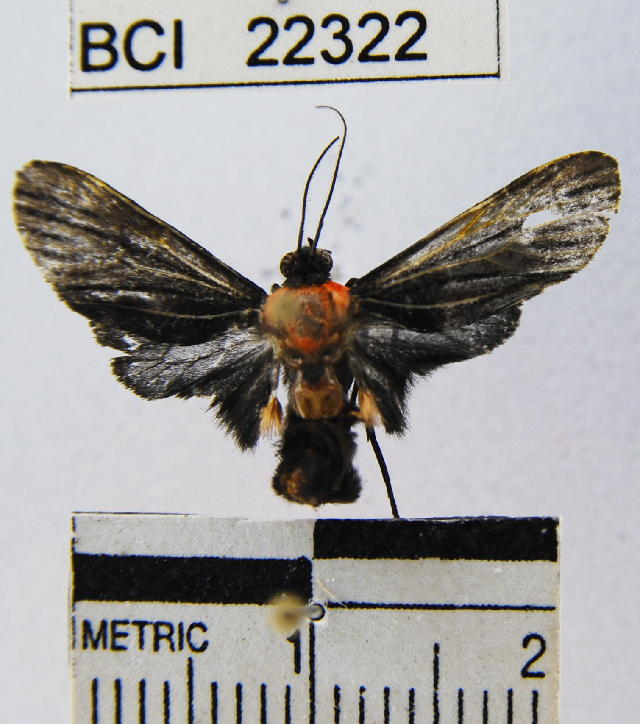
- Balbura intervenata

Scientific classification
- Kingdom: Animalia
- Phylum: Arthropoda
- Class: Insecta
- Order: Lepidoptera
- Superfamily: Noctuoidea
- Family: Erebidae
- Subfamily: Arctiinae
- Tribe: Lithosiini
- Genus: Balbura; Walker, 1854

= Balbura =

Genus of insects

Balbura is a genus of moths in the subfamily Arctiinae.

== Species ==
- Balbura dorsisigna Walker 1854
- Balbura fasciata
- Balbura fresini
- Balbura intervenata
