= Oenoanda =

Archaeological site in Turkey

Coordinates: 36°48′33″N 29°32′59″E

- 𒃾𒅀𒉌𒌓𒉿𒀭𒁕 (Hittite) Wiyanawanda (Hittite); Οινόανδα (in Ancient Greek)
- Oinoanda
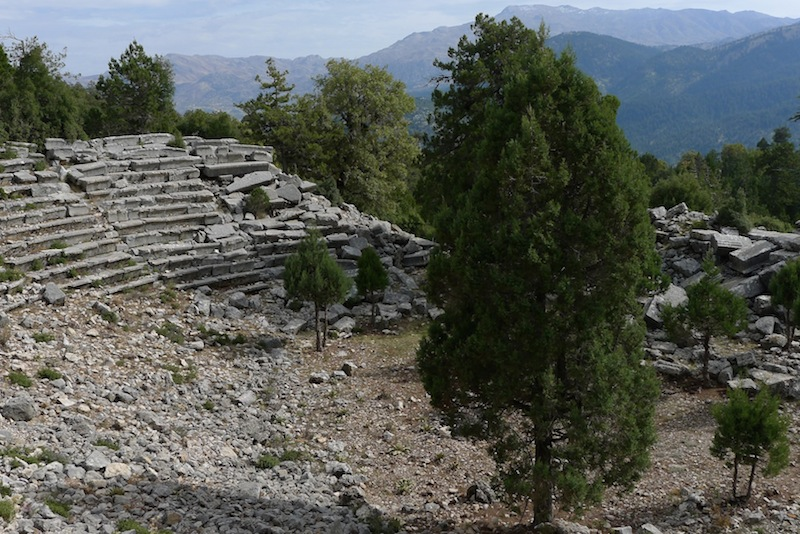
- The Greco-Roman theatre in Oenoanda

- Location within Turkey
- Type: Settlement
- Associated with: Diogenes
- Location: İncealiler, Muğla Province, Turkey
- Region: Lycia

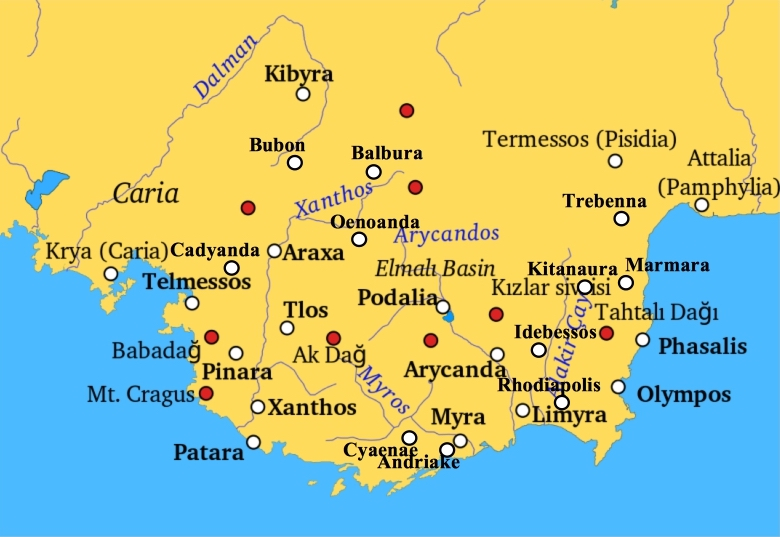
Cities of ancient Lycia

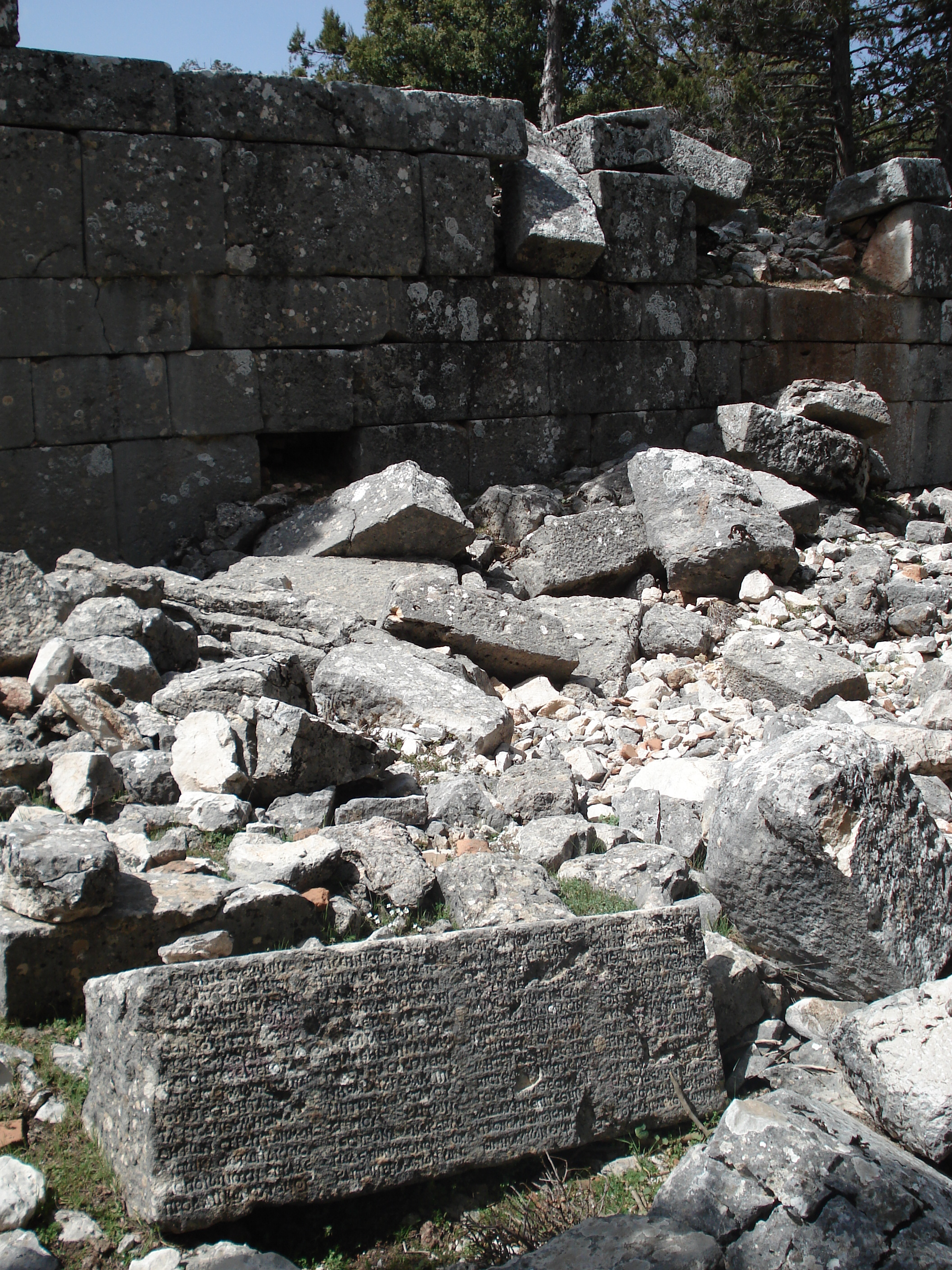
Part of the Inscription of Diogenes

Oenoanda (Note: Hittite: 𒃾𒅀𒉌𒌓𒉿𒀭𒁕, romanized: Wiyanawanda) or Termessos Minor (/iːnoʊˈændə/; Ancient Greek: Οἰνόανδα Oinoanda, Τερμησσός ἡ Μικρά Termessos ē Mikra) was a Lycian city, in the upper valley of the River Xanthus. It is noted for the philosophical inscription by the Epicurean, Diogenes of Oenoanda.

The ruins of the city lie on a high, isolated site, west of the modern village İncealiler in the Fethiye district of Muğla Province, Turkey, which partly overlies the ancient site.

The place name suggests that it was known for viticulture.

== History ==
The early history of the settlement is obscure, in spite of an exploratory survey carried out, with permission of the Turkish authorities, by the British Institute at Ankara (BIAA) in 1974–76.

=== Late Bronze Age ===
The city was known as Wiyanawanda by the Hittites. It means "rich in vines/wine" or "land of the wine". During the Bronze Age it was a part of the Lukka lands which corresponds to Lycia from classical antiquity.

=== Classical Age ===
It seems that Oenoanda became a colony of Termessos about 200-190 BC and was also called Termessos Minor (Τερμησσός ἡ προς Οἰνοάνδοις Termessos i pros Oinoandois 'Termessos near Oenoanda'). Oenoanda was the most southerly of the Kibyran Tetrapolis, formed in the 2nd c. BC (Hellenistic Period), with Bubon, Balbura, and Kibyra which was dissolved by L. Licinius Murena in 84 BC, whereupon Oenoanda became part of the Lycian League, as its inscriptions abundantly demonstrate.

Diogenes, a rich and influential citizen of Oenoanda, had a summary of the philosophy of Epicurus carved onto a portico wall of the stoa showing the inhabitants the road to happiness. The inscription is one of the most important sources for the school of Epicurus and sets out his teachings on physics, epistemology, and ethics. It was originally about 25,000 words and 80 m long and filled 260 m^{2} of wall space. The inscription has been assigned on epigraphic grounds to the Hadrianic period, 117–138. The stoa was dismantled in the second half of the third century to extend the defensive wall.

It was occupied into the Byzantine period when a fortress and churches were built.

Oenoanda is a titular see of the Roman Catholic Church.

== The site ==
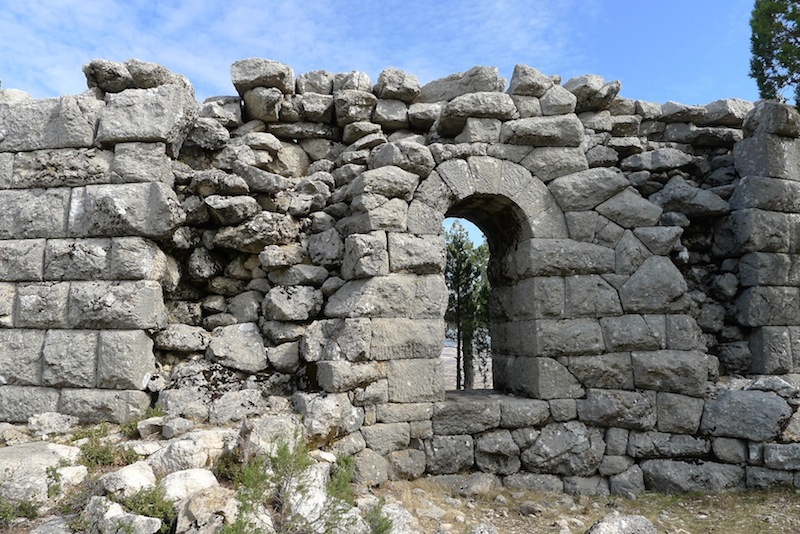
Hellenic polygonal wall and Postern gate

The site was first noted by Richard Hoskyn and Edward Forbes, in 1841, and published in 1842. The extensive philosophical inscriptions of Diogenes of Oenoanda were identified later from scattered fragments, apparently from the stoa.

The city walls are well preserved and stand to 10 m in places. The Hellenistic city wall is over 65 m long and is a superb example of polygonal masonry with small stones on the interior faces while large ashlars were used for the imposing exterior faces.

Part of an aqueduct can be seen in terms of stone pipe sections from a siphon.

Evidence for an ancient Roman Bridge at Oinoanda surfaced in the 1990s. A Latin inscription, and thus also the construction of the bridge, are dated to the reign of the Roman governor in Lycia, Titus Clodius Eprius Marcellus, who is known to have held the office in the year 54 AD.

Official excavations at the site started only in 1997. New archaeological work was started in 2009 by the Deutsches Archäologisches Institut.

By 2012 over 300 fragments of Diogenes' stoa had been identified, varying in size from a few letters to passages of several sentences covering more than one block.

Remains of a screw wine press were also discovered in a house which could prove that the activity suggested in the place name continued to be practised into the late history of the city.

== Notable people ==
- Lucius Septimius Flavianus Flavillianus (3rd century AD), Roman army member
