= Milyas =

Country in ancient south-west Anatolia

Milyas (Ancient Greek: Μιλυάς) was a mountainous country in ancient south-west Anatolia (modern Turkey). However, it is generally described as being mostly in the northern part of the successor kingdom of Lycia, as well as southern Pisidia, and part of eastern Phrygia. According to Herodotus, the boundaries of Milyas were never fixed.

Its inhabitants used the endonym Milyae (Μιλύαι), or Milyans. However, the oldest known name for inhabitants of the area is Sólymoi (Σόλυμοι), Solymi and Solymians – names that are probably derived from the nearby Mount Solymus. Louis Feldman suggested that the Solymoi originally spoke an unattested Semitic language (this opinion is not commonly supported), whereas the Milyan language was an Indo-European language.

== Toponymy ==
Later the name Milyas was sometimes used to describe only as a part of Lycia. However, after the accession of the dynasty of the Greek Seleucidae in Syria, the name Milyas was limited to the south-western part of Pisidia, bordering upon Lycia, that is, the territory extending from Termessus northward to the foot of Mount Cadmus. This district, the western part of which bore the name of Cabalia, is afterwards described, sometimes as a part of Lycia (as by Ptolemy) and sometimes as part of Pamphylia or Pisidia (as by Pliny the Elder). After the conquest of the Greek Antiochus the Great, the Romans gave the country to Eumenes, though Pisidian princes still continue to be mentioned as its rulers.

== Geography ==
The Solymi appear to have taken their name from a mountain in Anatolia named Solymus (later Güllük Dagi).

The greater part of Milyas was rugged and mountainous, but it also contained a few fertile plains. The name, which does not occur in the Homeric poems, probably belonged to the remnants of the Milyae, who had been driven into the mountains by invaders from Crete, known as the Termilae, who later referred to themselves as Lycians.

Important cities and towns in Milyas included Cibyra, Oenoanda, Balbura, and Bubon, which formed the Cibyratian tetrapolis. Some authors also mention a town named Milyas, which must have been situated north of Termessus in Pisidia.
