= Olbia (Pamphylia) =

Town on the coast of ancient Pamphylia

Coordinates: 36°52′45″N 30°39′31″E

Olbia (Ancient Greek: Ὀλβία) was the westernmost town on the coast of ancient Pamphylia, which some ancient writers place in Lycia. Ptolemy places it between Phaselis and Attaleia. Stephanus of Byzantium blames Philo for ascribing this town to Pamphylia, since, as he asserts, it was situated in the territory of the Solymi, and its real name was Olba; but the critic is here himself at fault, confounding Olbia with the Pisidian Olbasa. Strabo describes Olbia as a strong fortress, and its inhabitants colonised the Lycian town of Cadrema.

The remains of the ancient settlement are located near the Arapsuyu neighbourhood, part of the Konyaaltı district of Antalya, Turkey.
