= Kollyba (Lycia) =

Kollyba (Ancient Greek: Κολλύβα) was a town of ancient Lycia, which per the Stadiasmus Patarensis was on the road from Lycae to Pygela.

Its site is unlocated, but is conjectured to be in the upper watershed of the Alakır River.
