= Cadrema =

Town of ancient Lycia

Coordinates: 36°36′50″N 30°26′25″E

Cadrema or Kadrema (Ancient Greek: Κάδρεμα) was a town of ancient Lycia, a colony of Olbia. The name is supposed to derive from "the parching of corn" (Κάδρεμα).

Its site is located near Gedelma, Asiatic Turkey, and 1.8 kilometres (1.1 mi) from the site of Lycae.
