= Lycians =

People of Lycia

Lycians (Greek: Λύκιοι, romanized: Lúkioi) is the name of various peoples who lived, at different times, in Lycia, a geopolitical area in Anatolia (also known as Asia Minor).

== History ==
The Greek historian Herodotus wrote about them:

The Lykians however have sprung originally from Crete (for in old time the whole of Crete was possessed by Barbarians). When the sons of Europa, Sarpedon and Minos, came to be at variance in Crete about the kingdom, Minos having got the better in the strife of parties drove out both Sarpedon himself and those of his party. Those expelled came to the land of Milyas in Asia, for the land which now the Lykians inhabit was anciently called Milyas, and the Milyans were then called Solymoi. Now while Sarpedon reigned over them, they were called by the name which they had when they came thither, and by which the Lykians are even now called by the neighbouring tribes, namely Termilai; but when from Athens Lycos the son of Pandion came to the land of the Termilai and to Sarpedon, he too having been driven out by his brother namely Aigeus, then by the name taken from Lycos they were called after a time Lykians. The customs which these have are partly Cretan and partly Carian; but one custom they have which is peculiar to them, and in which they agree with no other people, that is they call themselves by their mothers and not by their father; and if one asks his neighbour who he is, he will state his parentage on the mother's side and enumerate his mother's female ascendants. If a woman who is a citizen marry a slave, the children are accounted to be of gentle birth; but if a man who is a citizen, though he were the first man among them, have a slave for wife or concubine, the children are without civil rights.

— Herodotus, Histories, I.173.

The earliest known inhabitants of the area were the Solymoi (or Solymi), also known as the Solymians. Later in prehistory, another people, known as the Milyae (or Milyans) migrated to the same area; they spoke an Anatolian language (Indo-European) known as Milyan and the area was known as Milyas.

According to Herodotus, Milyas was subsequently settled by a people originating in Crete, whose endonym was trm̃mili – the hellenized form of this name was Termilae (Τερμίλαι). Under a leader named Sarpedon, the Termilae had been driven out of Crete (according to Herodotus) by Minos and settled in a large part of Milyas. Subsequently, the Milyae were concentrated increasingly in the adjoining mountains, whereas the Termilae remained a maritime people. The area occupied by the Termilae gradually became known to them as trm̃mis.

Greek sources referred to trm̃mis as Lykia (Latin: Lycia). The reason for this, according to Greek mythology, was that an Athenian aristocrat named Lykos (Lycus) and his followers settled in trm̃mis, after being exiled from Athens. The land was known to the Greeks as Lukia (later Lykia; Latin Lycia) and its inhabitants were referred to as Lukiae (later Lykiae; Latin Lyciani). However, trm̃mili remained their endonym.

From the 5th or 4th centuries BCE, Lycia came under increasing Greek social and political influences. The Lycian language became extinct and was replaced by Ancient Greek, some time around 200 BCE.

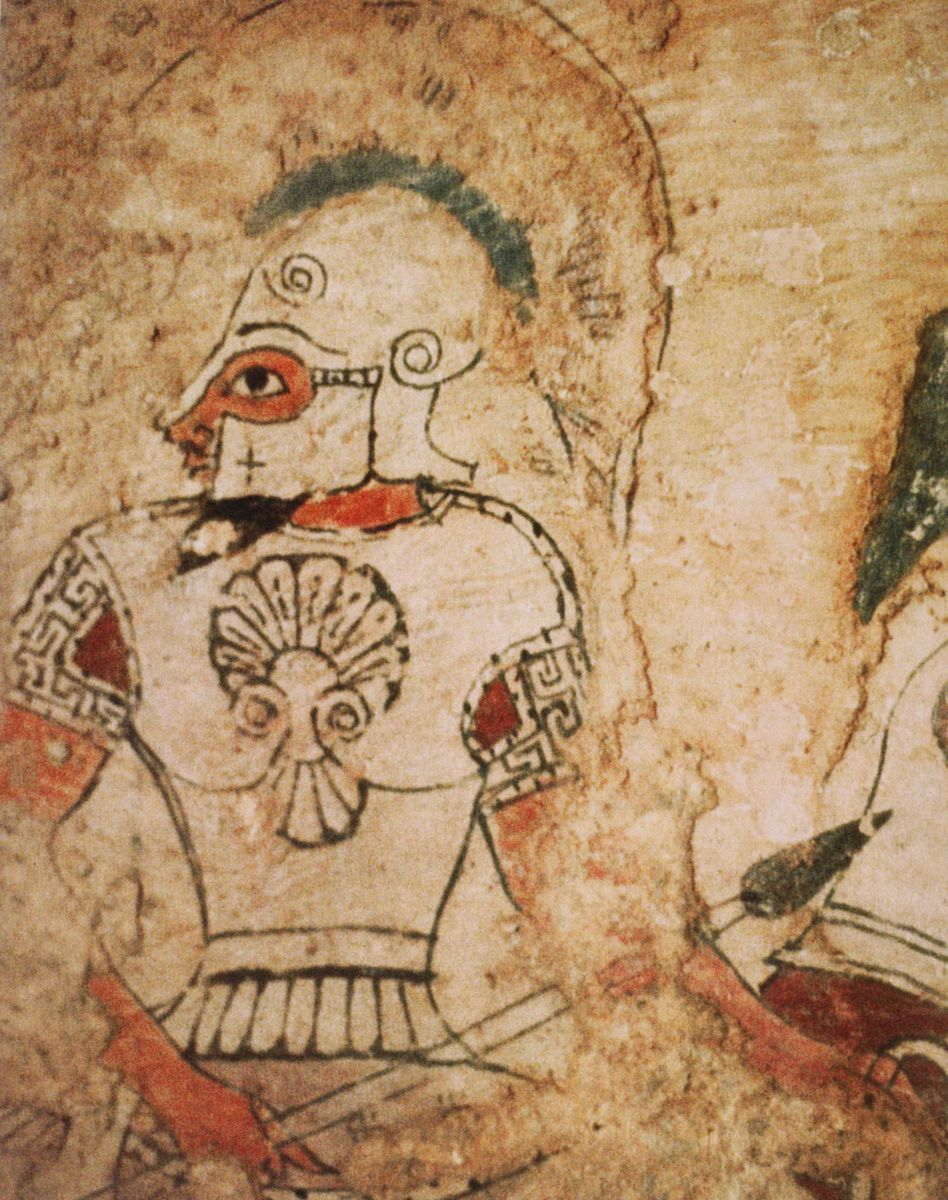
A Lycian warrior, fresco from Kizilbel, Lycia, c. 525 BCE

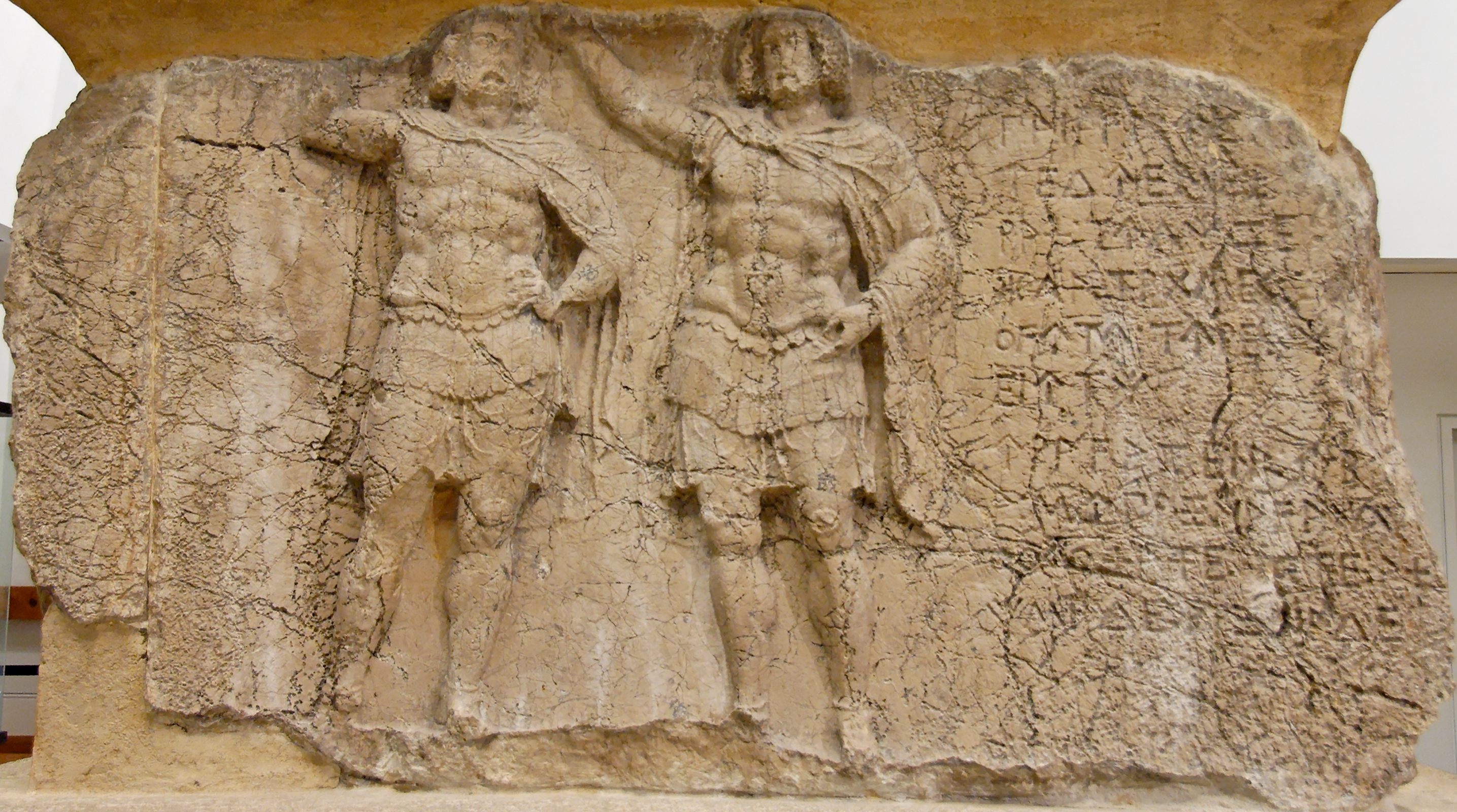
The Lycian Payava as depicted on his tomb. The Lycian inscription runs: "Payava, son of Ad[...], secretary of A[...]rah, by race a Lycian ...". 375–360 BCE.

Photios I of Constantinople wrote that Theopompus in one of his books mention how the Lycians, under the command of their king Pericles fought against Telmessos and they managed to corner them within their walls and forced them to negotiate.

During the period of Alexander the Great, Nearchus was appointed viceroy of Lycia and of the land adjacent to it as far as Mount Taurus.

Later classical scholars offer differing and sometimes plainly erroneous accounts of the Lycians. Strabo distinguished "Trojan Lycians" from the Termilae mentioned by Herodotus. Cicero stated flatly that the Lycians were a Greek tribe.

== Culture ==
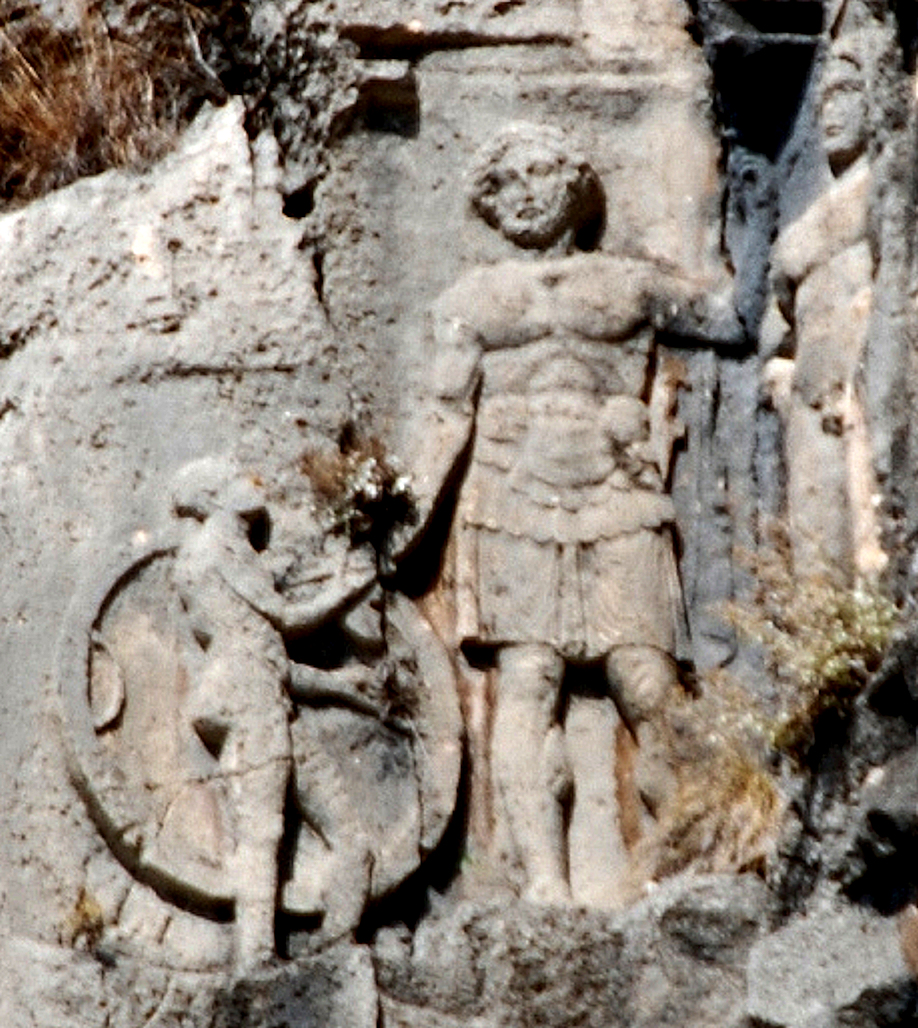
Lycian tomb relief at Myra, 4th century BCE.

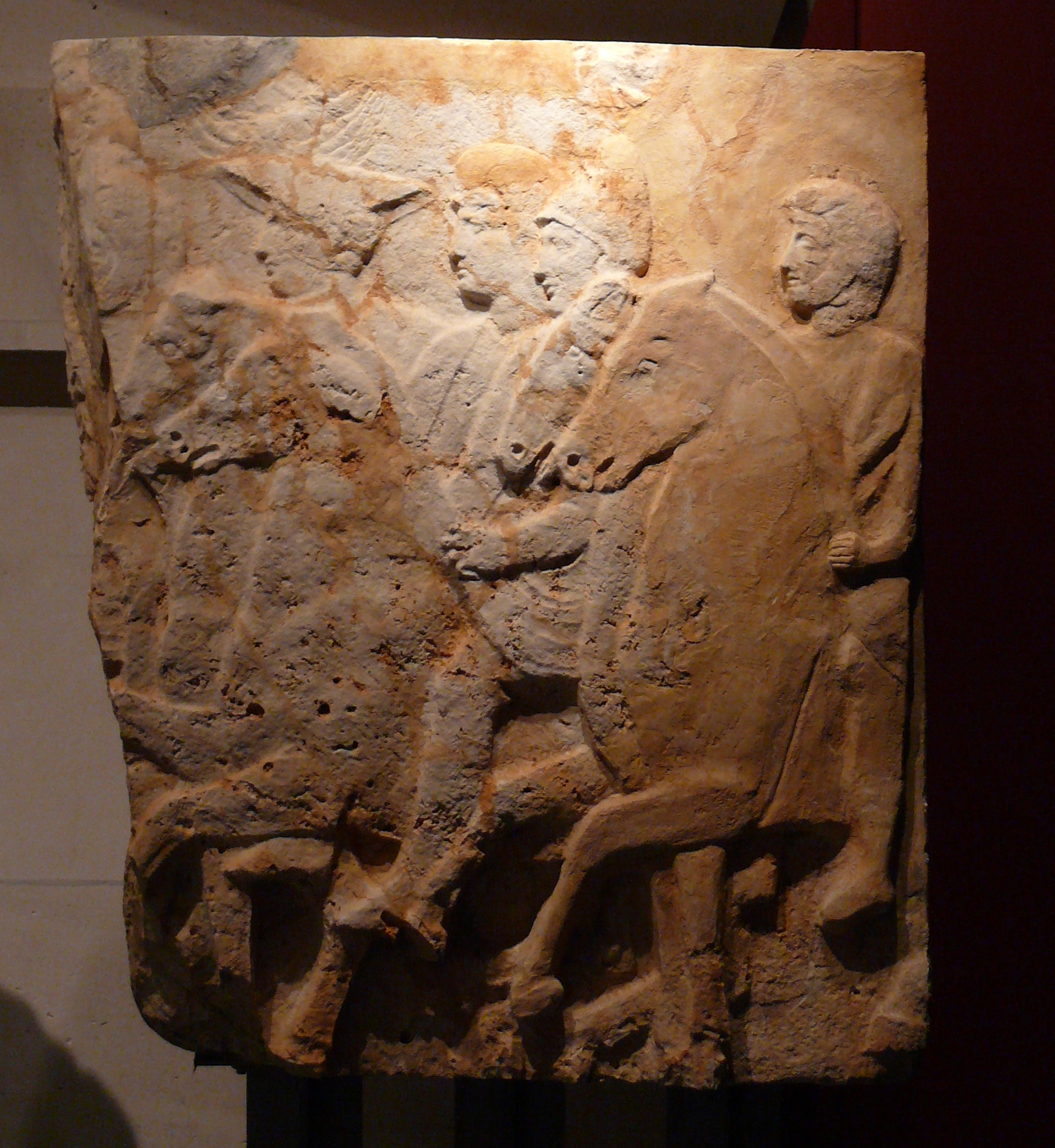
Horsemen, on the tomb of Pericles, last Lycian ruler.

According to Herodotus, the culture and customs of the Lycians resembled a hybrid of Cretan culture (like that of the Termilae) and that of the neighboring Carians (the Carians spoke an Anatolian language and one might infer from this that they were closely connected culturally to the Milyae). For instance, Herodotus mentioned a unique custom, whereby Lycian males named "themselves after their mothers" and emphasized their "mother's female ascendants". This passage has normally been understood as meaning that the Lycians were a matrilineal society.

In Greek culture, Lycia (like Delos and Delphi) was sacred to Apollo, who was also known as Lycian, Delian and Pythian (Delphi). In the Homeric Hymns, Apollo is mentioned as the lord of Lycia: "O Lord, Lycia is yours and lovely Maeonia and Miletus, charming city by the sea, but over wave-girt Delos you greatly reign your own self". Bacchylides in his Epinician Odes, called Apollo "lord of the Lycians'. Pindar in his Pythian Odes, called Apollo the "lord of Lycia and Delos, you who love the Castalian spring of Parnassus". In Aristophanes' The Knights, at some point Cleon called Apollo the god of Lycia. Semos the Delian wrote: "Some say the birth of Apollo took place in Lycia, others Delos, others Zoster in Attica, others Tegyra in Boeotia."

The 2nd century CE geographer Pausanias wrote that the Lycians in Patara showed a bronze bowl in their temple of Apollo, saying that Telephus dedicated it and Hephaestus made it. In addition, Pausanias also wrote that the Lycian poet Olen composed some of the oldest Greek hymns. Clement of Alexandria wrote that the statues of Zeus and Apollo, along with the lions that were dedicated to them, were created by Phidias. Solinus wrote that the Lycians dedicated a city to Hephaestus and called it Hephaestia.

== Archaeology ==
Throughout the 1950s, P. Demargne and H. Metzger meticulously explored the site of Xanthos in Lycia, which included an acropolis. Metzger reported the discovery of Geometric pottery dating the occupation of the citadel to the 8th century BCE. J.M. Cook concluded that these discoveries constituted the earliest form of material culture in Lycia since the region may have been uninhabited throughout prehistoric times. The Lycians may ultimately have been nomadic settlers who descended into the southwestern areas of Asia Minor during the 8th century BCE.

== See also ==
- Lycia
- Lycian language
- Lycian script
- Carians
- Mysians
- Lydians
- Lukka lands
