= Termessos =

Ancient city in Turkey

- Τερμησσός (Greek)
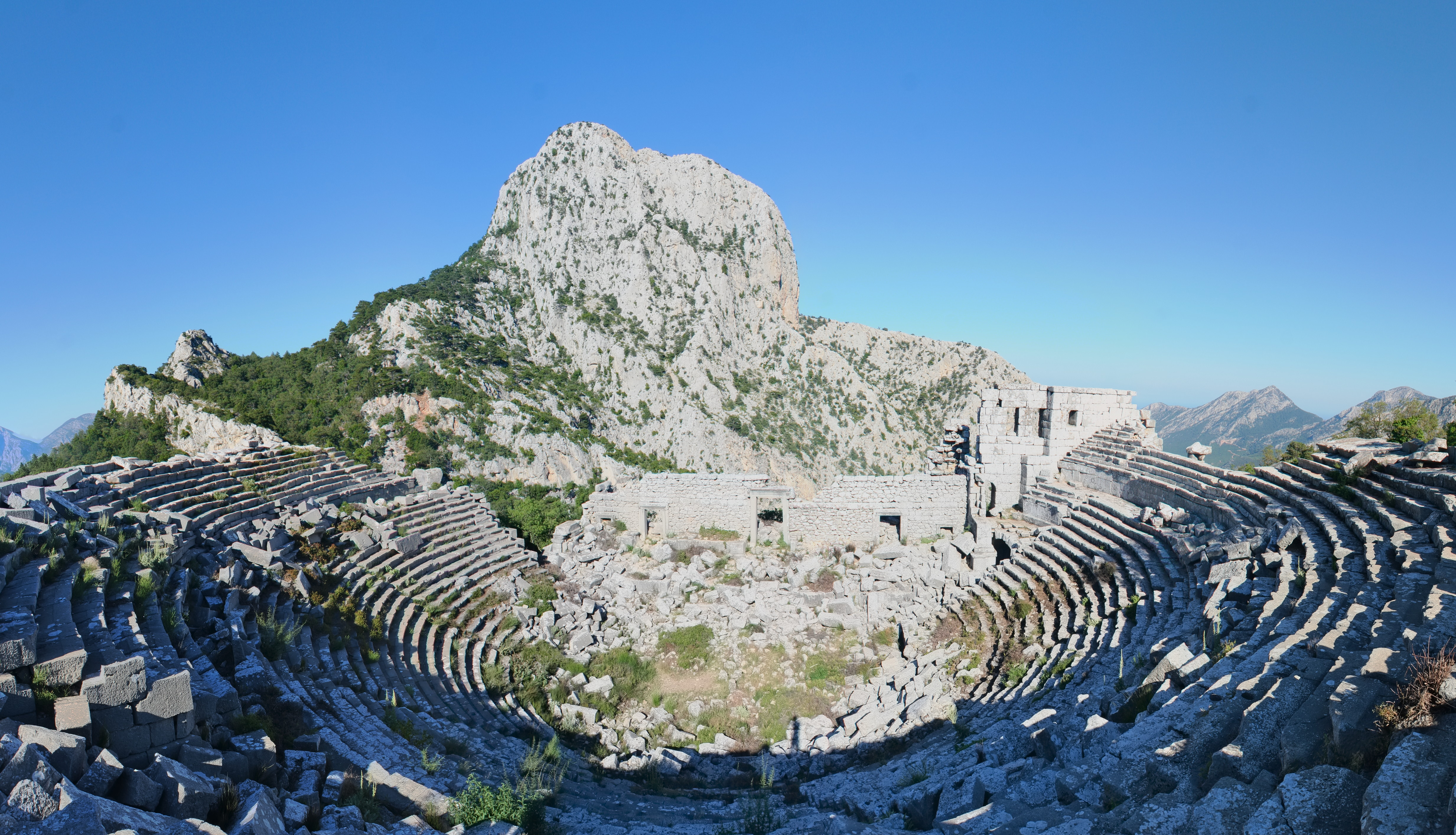
- Theatre in Termessos

- Location within Turkey
- 36°58′57″N 30°27′53″E
- Type: Settlement
- Location: Korkuteli, Antalya Province, Turkey
- Region: Pisidia

Site notes
- Public access: Yes
- Website: Termessos Archeological Site and National Park

Termessos (Greek Τερμησσός Termēssós), also known as Termessos Major (Τερμησσός ἡ μείζων), was a Pisidian city built at an altitude of about 1000 metres at the south-west side of Solymos Mountain (modern Güllük Dağı) in the Taurus Mountains (modern Korkuteli, Antalya Province, Turkey). It lies 17 kilometres to the north-west of Antalya. It lies on a natural platform on the slopes of Güllük Dağı, which itself rises to 1,665 metres.

Termessos is one of the best preserved of the ancient cities in Turkey. The city was founded by the Solymi, who were mentioned by Homer in the Iliad in connection with the legend of Bellerophon. Originally a Pisidian settlement, it integrated into the Greek world after Alexander the Great's conquests. By the turn of the second and third centuries AD, under Imperial Roman rule, it had become a thriving provincial city.

Formal excavation has started in 2025 on the lower city , Termessos also has been explored and surveyed, leading to extensive publications of over a thousand inscriptions. Because of its natural and historical riches, the city is included in the Mount Güllük-Termessos National Park.

== Mythology ==
According to Greek mythology, Bellerophon fought against the Solymi in the region. Strabo writes that near Termessos there are shown the so-called "Palisade of Bellerophon" and the tomb of his son Isander (called Peisander in Strabo's account), who is said to have been slain by Ares in battle against the Solymi.

== History ==
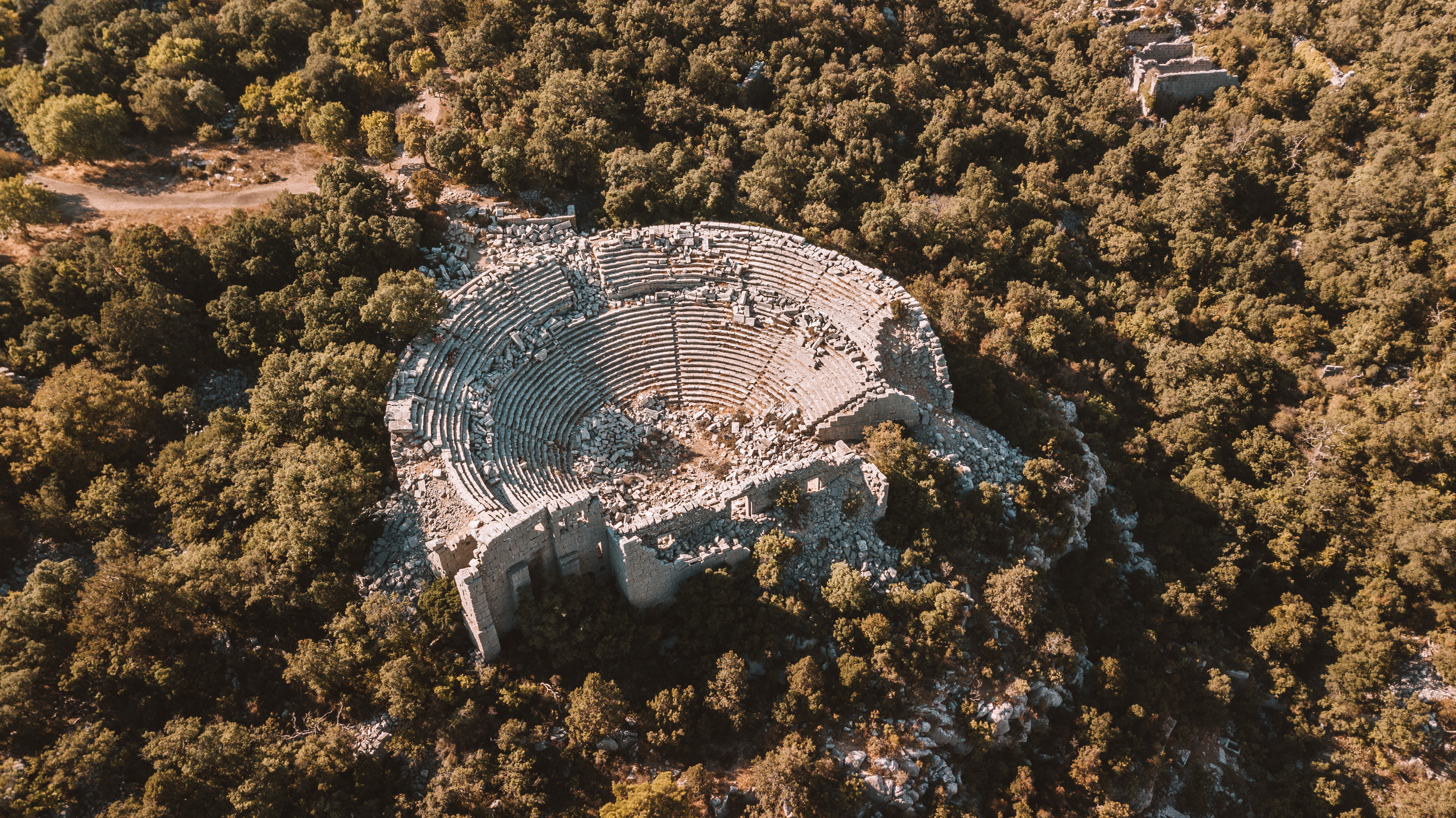
View of Termessos from the air

What is known of Termessos' history commences principally at the time that Alexander the Great surrounded the city in 333 BC; he likened the city to an eagle's nest and in one of few cases, failed to conquer it. Arrian, one of the ancient historians who dealt with this event and recorded the strategic importance of Termessos, notes that even a small force could easily defend it due to the insurmountable natural barriers surrounding the city. The location of the city at the mountain pass between the Phrygian hinterland and the plains of Pamphylia is described by Arrian. Alexander wanted to go to Phrygia from Pamphylia, and according to Arrian, the road passed by Termessos. There are other passes much lower and easier to access, so why Alexander chose to ascend the steep Yenice pass is still a matter of dispute. It is even said that his hosts in Perge sent Alexander up the wrong path. Alexander wasted much time and effort trying to force his way through the pass, which had been closed by the Termessians, and so, in anger he turned toward Termessos and surrounded it. Probably because he knew he could not capture the city, Alexander did not undertake an assault, but instead marched north and vented his fury on Sagalassos.

According to Strabo, the inhabitants of Termessos called themselves the Solymi, a Pisidian people. Their name, as well as that of the mountain, was derived from Solymeus, an Anatolian god who later became identified with Zeus, giving rise there to the cult of Zeus Solymeus . This name still exists as a surname in some people in Antalya region. The coins of Termessos often depict this god and give his name.

The historian Diodorus recorded in full detail another incident in the history of Termessos. In 319 BC, after the death of Alexander, one of his generals, Antigonos Monophtalmos, proclaimed himself master of Asia Minor and set out to do battle with his rival Alcetas, whose base of support was Pisidia. His forces were made up of some 40,000 infantry, 7,000 cavalry, and numerous elephants. Unable to vanquish these superior forces, Alcetas and his friends sought refuge in Termessos. The Termessians gave Alcetas their word that they would help him.

At this time, Antigonos came and set up camp in front of the city, seeking delivery of his rival. Not wanting their city to be dragged into disaster for the sake of a Macedonian foreigner, the elders of the city decided to hand Alcetas over to Antigonos. However, the youths of Termessos wanted to keep their word and refused to go along with the plan. The elders sent Antigonos an envoy to inform him of their intent to surrender Alcetas. According to a secret plan to continue the fight, the youth of Termessos managed to leave the city. Learning of his imminent capture and preferring death to being handed over to his enemy, Alcetas killed himself. The elders delivered his corpse to Antigonos. After subjecting the corpse to all manner of abuse for three days, Antigonos departed Pisidia leaving the corpse unburied. The youth, greatly resenting what had happened, recovered Alcetas' corpse, buried it with full honours, and erected a beautiful monument to his memory.

Termessos's lands stretched south-east to the Gulf of Attaleia (Antalya). Because the city possessed this link to the sea it was taken by the Ptolemies.

An inscription found in the Lycian city of Araxa yields important information about Termessos. According to this inscription, in the 2nd century BC, Termessos was at war for unknown reasons with the league of Lycian cities, and again in 189 BC found itself battling its Pisidian neighbour Isinda. At this same time, the colony of Termessos Minor was founded 85 km in the south-south-west (Oinoanda). Termessos entered into friendly relations with Attalos II, king of Pergamon, the better to combat its ancient enemy Selge. Attalos II commemorated this friendship by building a two-storied stoa in Termessos.

Livy reports that in 189 BC the Termessians were besieging Isinda, whose inhabitants were trapped in their citadel and facing starvation and death. The people of Isinda appealed to the Roman consul for assistance. The Romans intervened, raised the siege, and then imposed peace terms on Termessus, including a payment of 50 talents of silver.

Termessos was an ally and supporter of the Roman Republic, and so in 71 BC was granted independent status by the Roman Senate; according to this law its freedom and rights were guaranteed. This independence was maintained continuously for a long time, the only exception being an alliance with Amyntas king of Galatia (reigned 36-25 BC). This independence is documented also by the coins of Termessos, which bear the title "Autonomous".

In the imperial period, Termessos became part of the Roman province of Lycia et Pamphylia. By the turn of the second and third centuries AD, it had become a thriving provincial city.

The end of Termessos came when its aqueduct was crushed in an earthquake, destroying the water supply to the city. The city was abandoned (year unknown), which helps to explain its remarkable state of preservation today.

== Site today ==
=== Approach ===
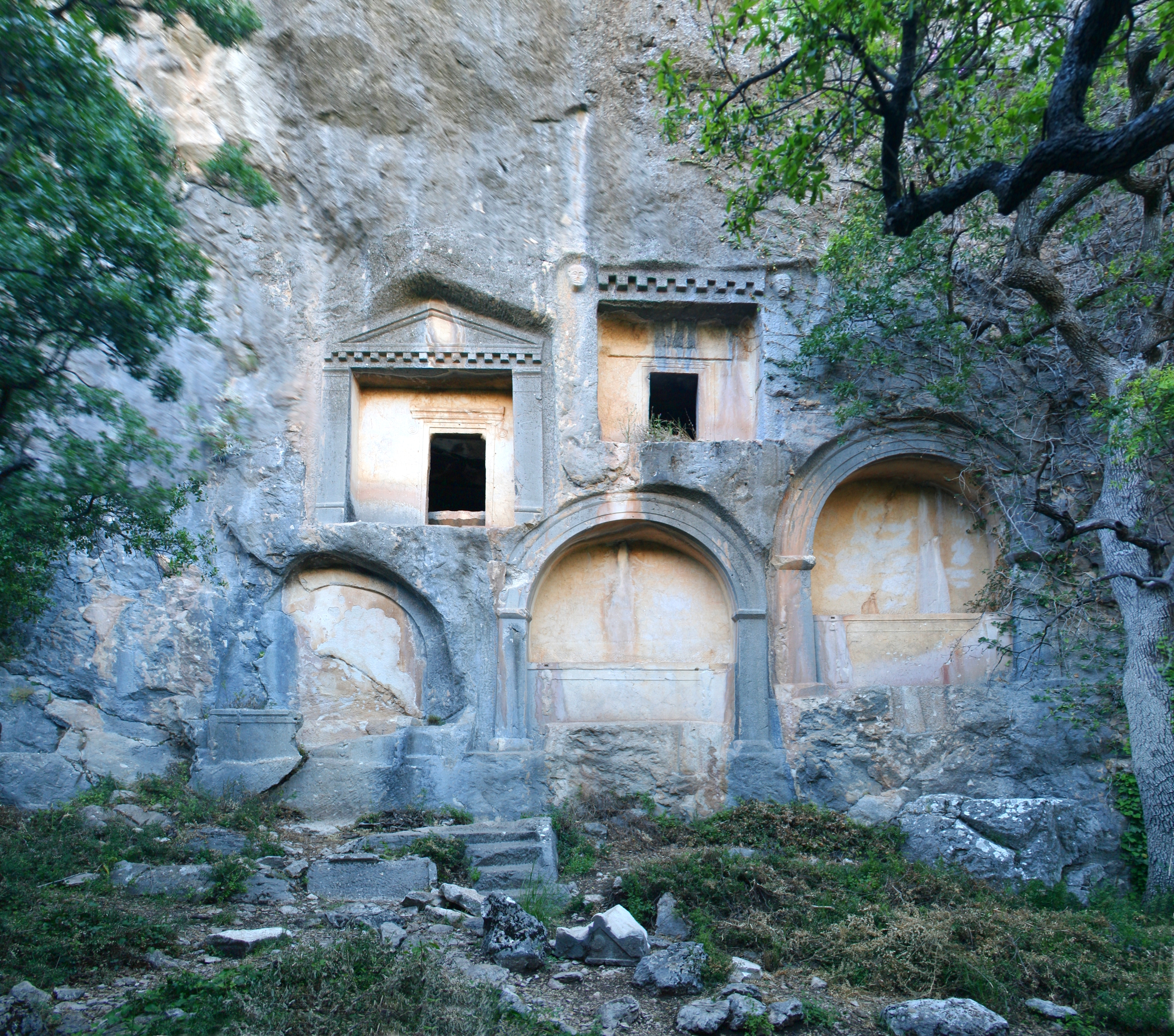
Rock-cut tombs along main road into Termessos

From the main road, a steep road leads up to the city. From this road one can see the famous Yenice pass, through which wound the ancient road that the Termessians called "King Street" as well as Hellenistic period fortification walls, cisterns and many other remains. King Street, built in the 2nd century AD by contributions from the people of Termessos, passes through the city walls higher up and stretches in a straight line all the way to the centre of the city. In the walls to the east of the city gate are inscriptions with augury by dice. Throughout the history of the Roman Empire, beliefs of this sort-in sorcery, magic, and superstition-were widespread. The Termessians were probably very interested in fortune telling. Inscriptions of this kind are usually four to five lines long and include numbers to be thrown with the dice, the name of the god wanted for soothsaying, and the nature of the prediction given in the counsels of that god.

=== Main square ===
The part of Termessos where the principal official buildings are located lies on a flat area a little beyond the inner walls. The most striking of these structures is the agora, which has very special architectural characteristics. The ground floor of this open-air market place has been raised on stone blocks, and to its north-west five big cisterns have been hollowed out. The agora is surrounded on three sides by stoas. According to the inscription found on the two-storey stoa on the north-west, it was presented to Termessos by Attalos II, king of Pergamum (reigned 150-138 BC) as proof of his friendship. As for the north-eastern stoa, it was built by a wealthy Termessian named Osbaras, probably in imitation of the stoa of Attalos. The ruins lying to the north-east of the agora must belong to the gymnasium, but they are hard to make out among all the trees. The two-storey building consisted of an internal courtyard surrounded by vaulted rooms. The exterior is decorated with niches and other ornamentation of the Doric order. This structure dates from the 1st century AD.

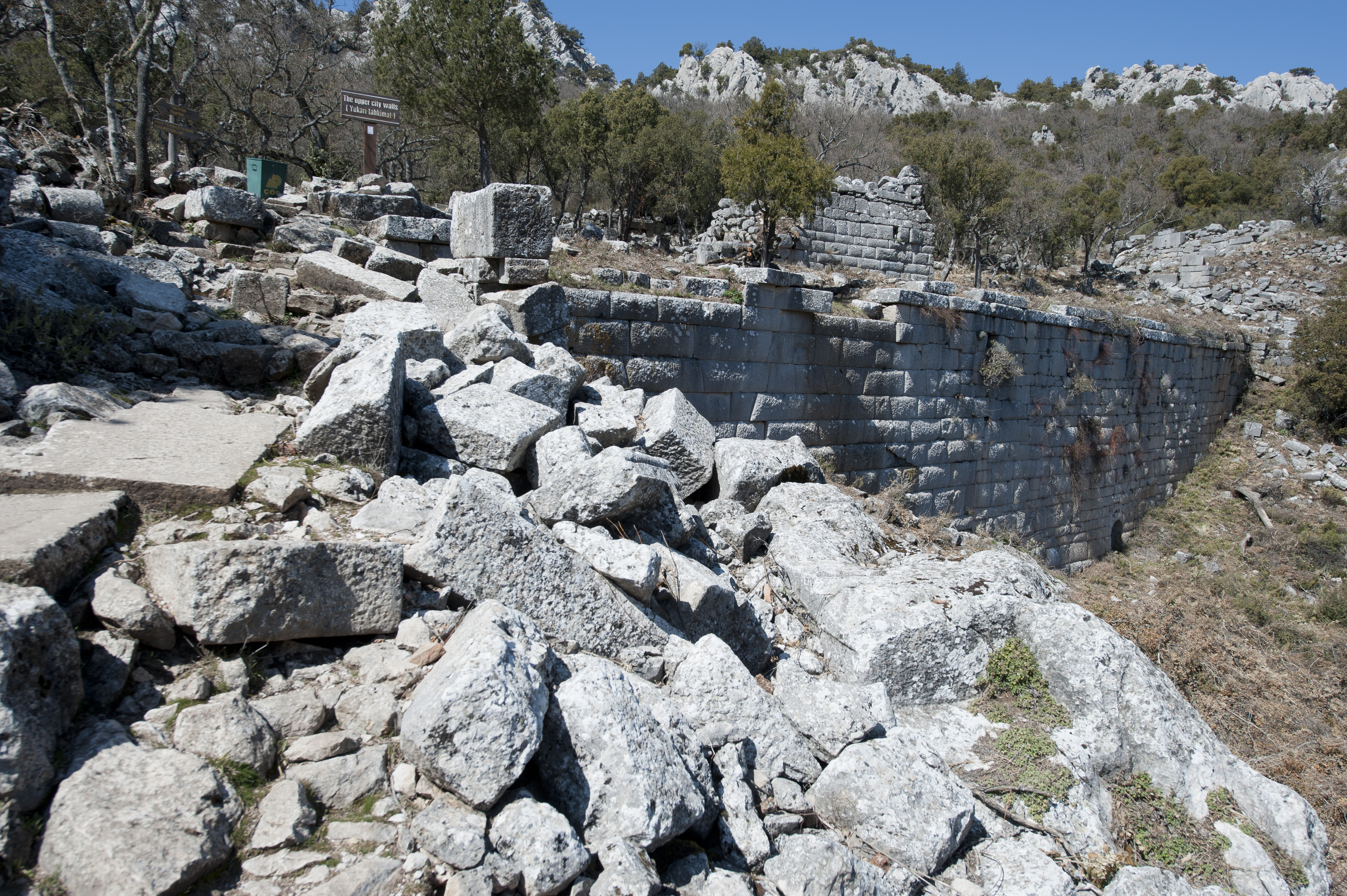
Termessos Upper city wall

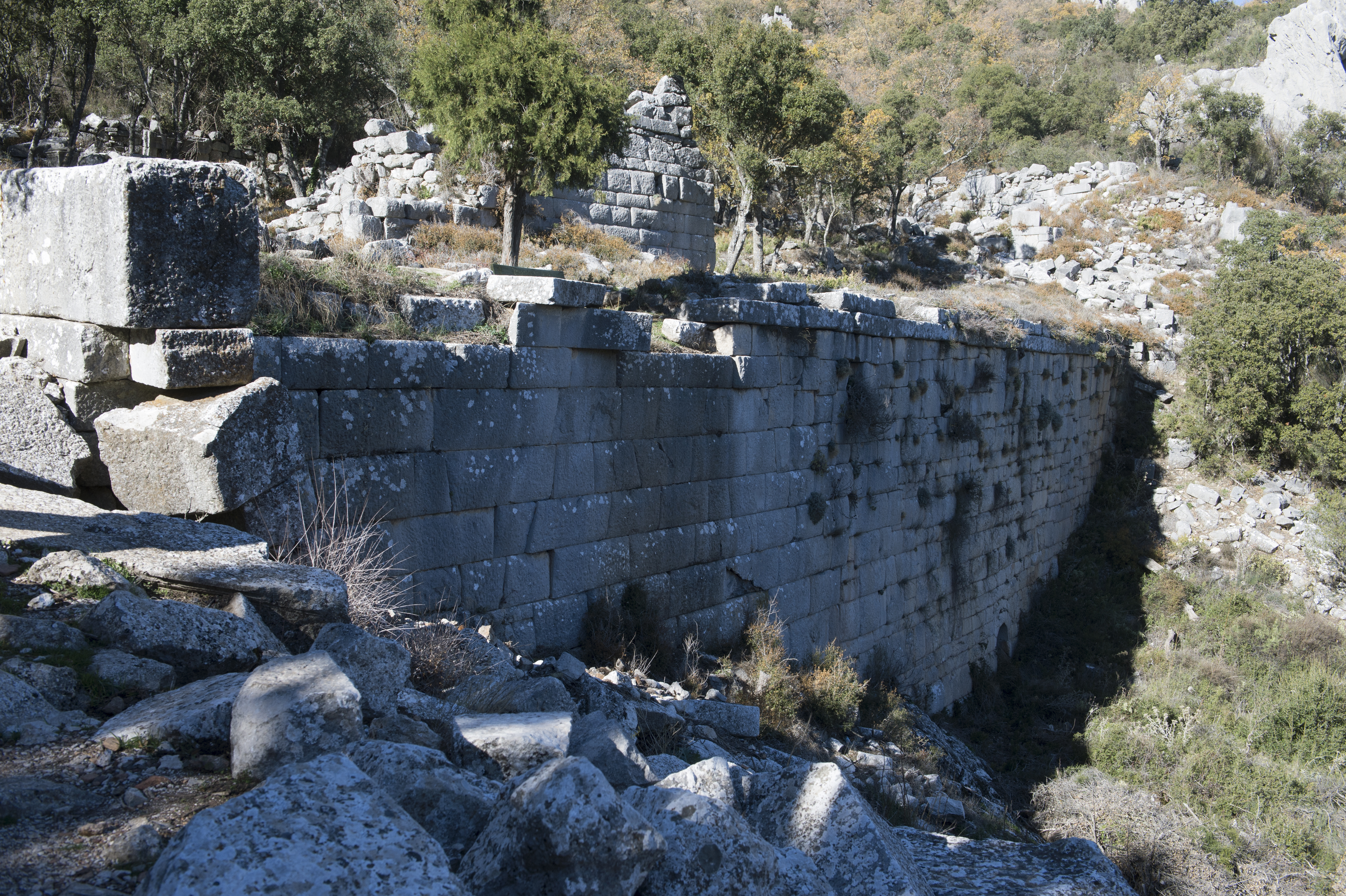
Termessos Upper city wall

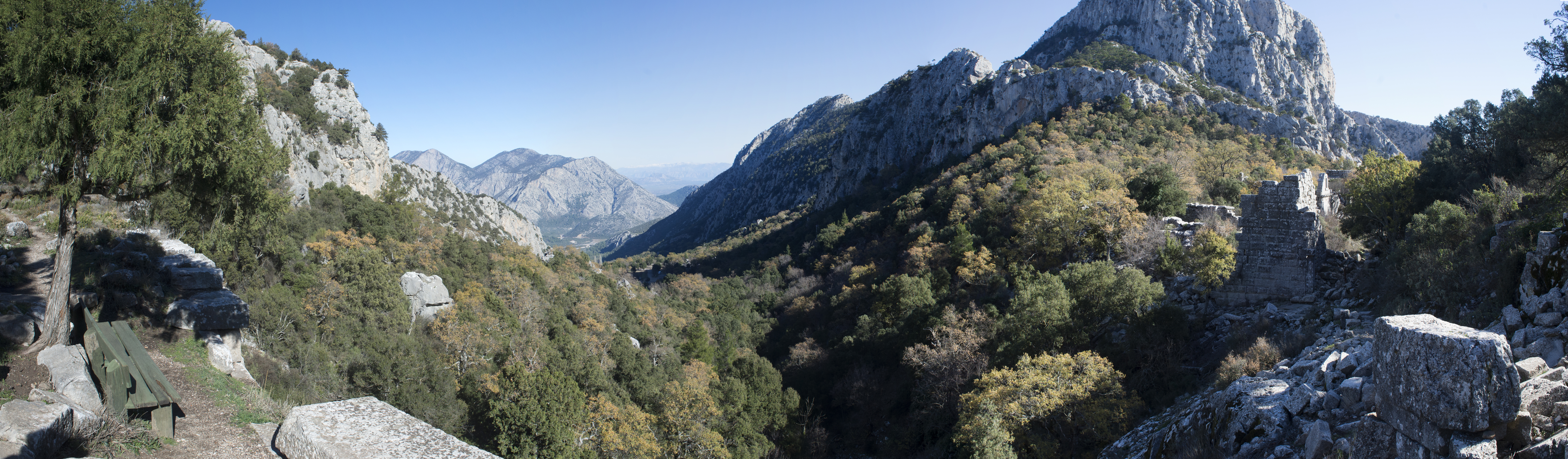
Termessos panorama

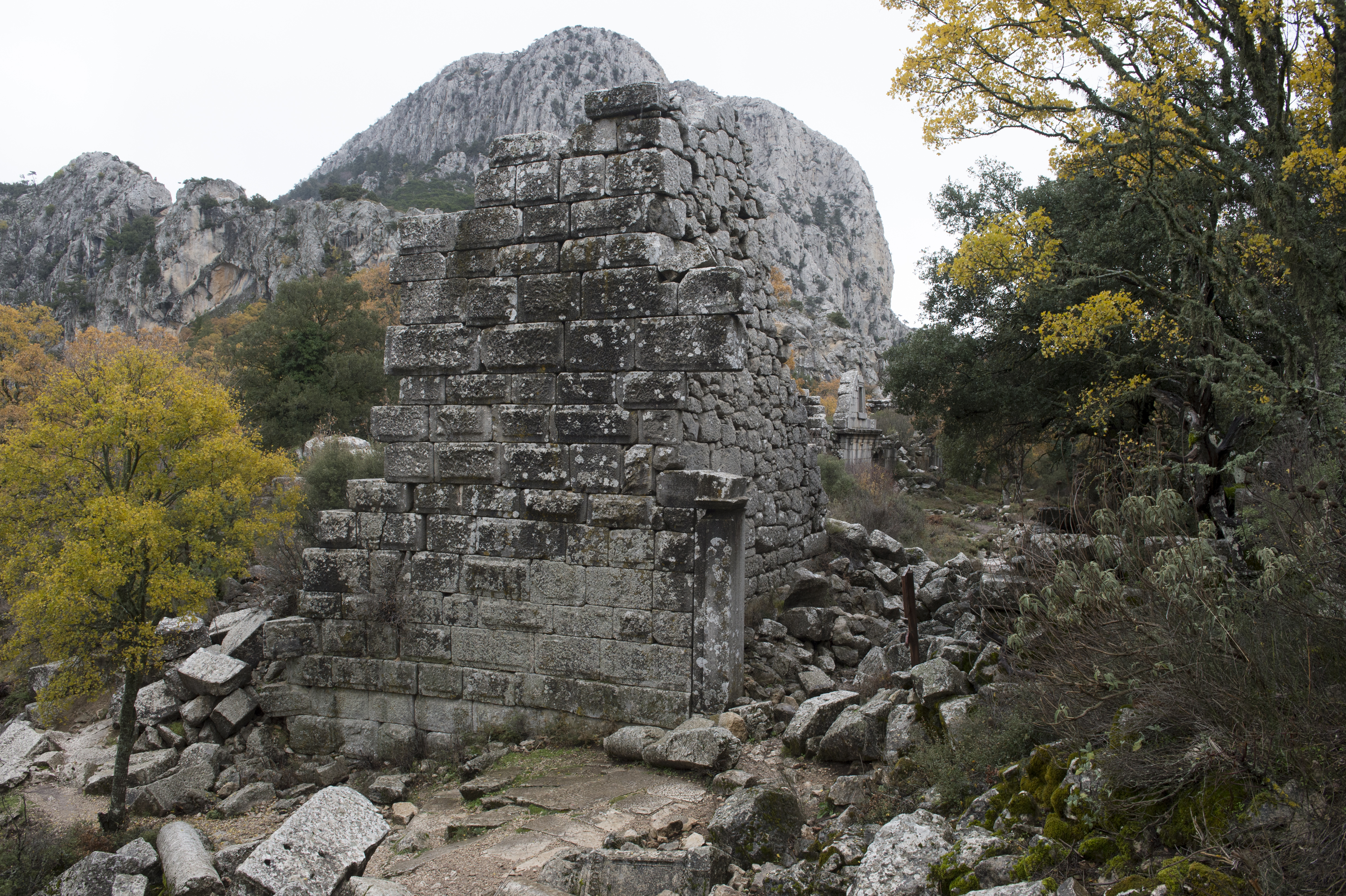
Termessos Upper city wall

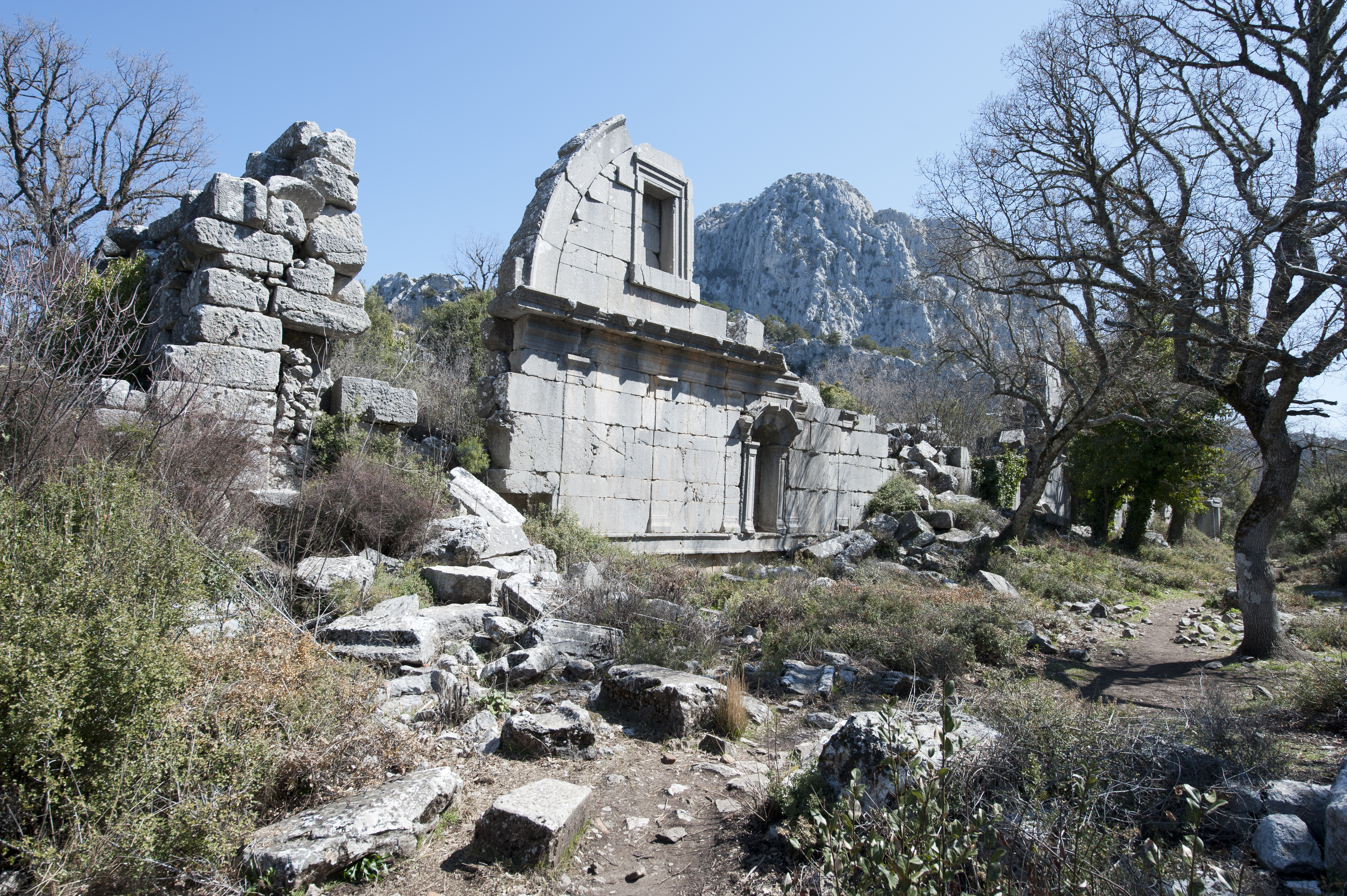
Termessos Gymnasium

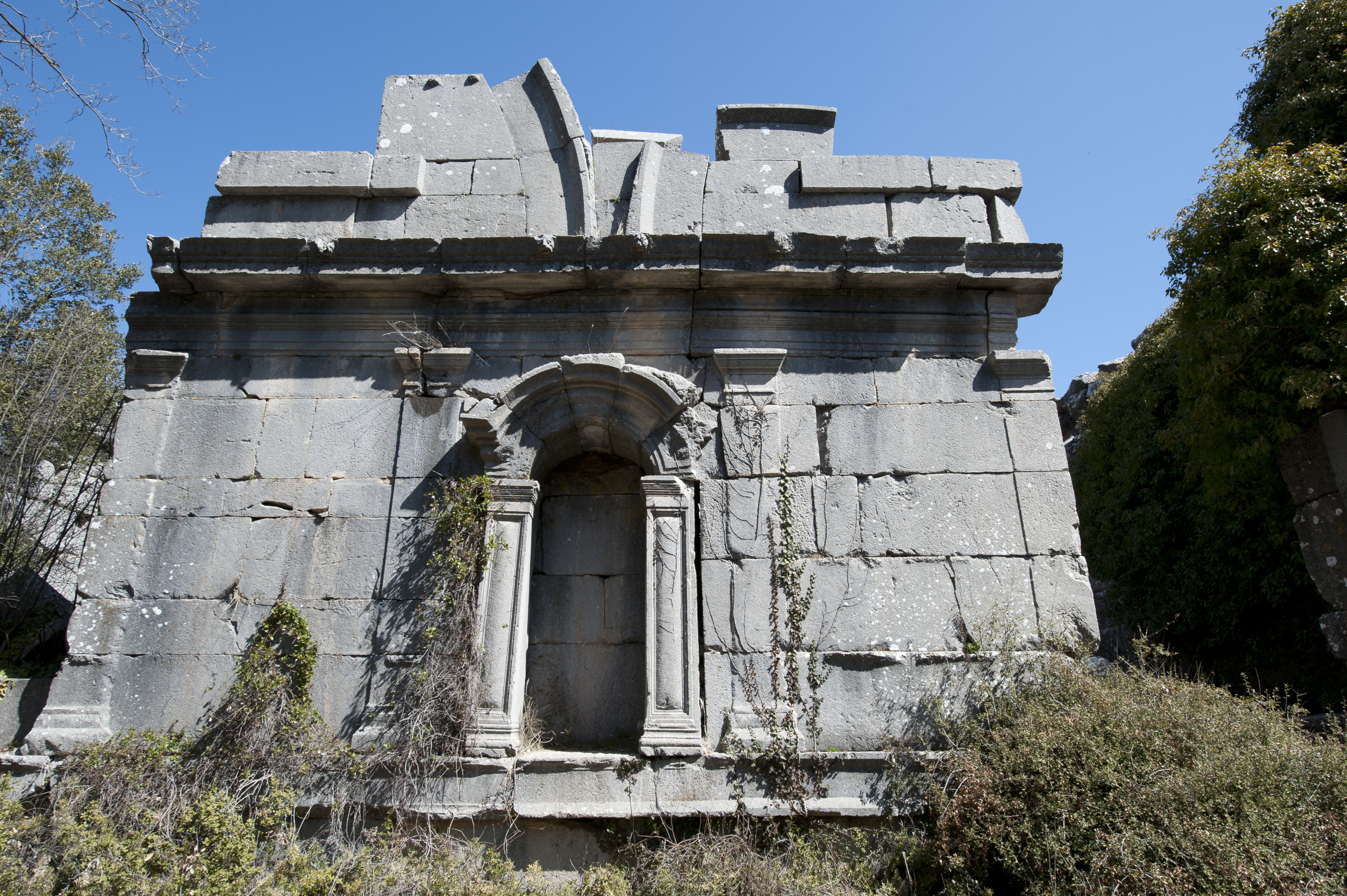
Termessos Gymnasium

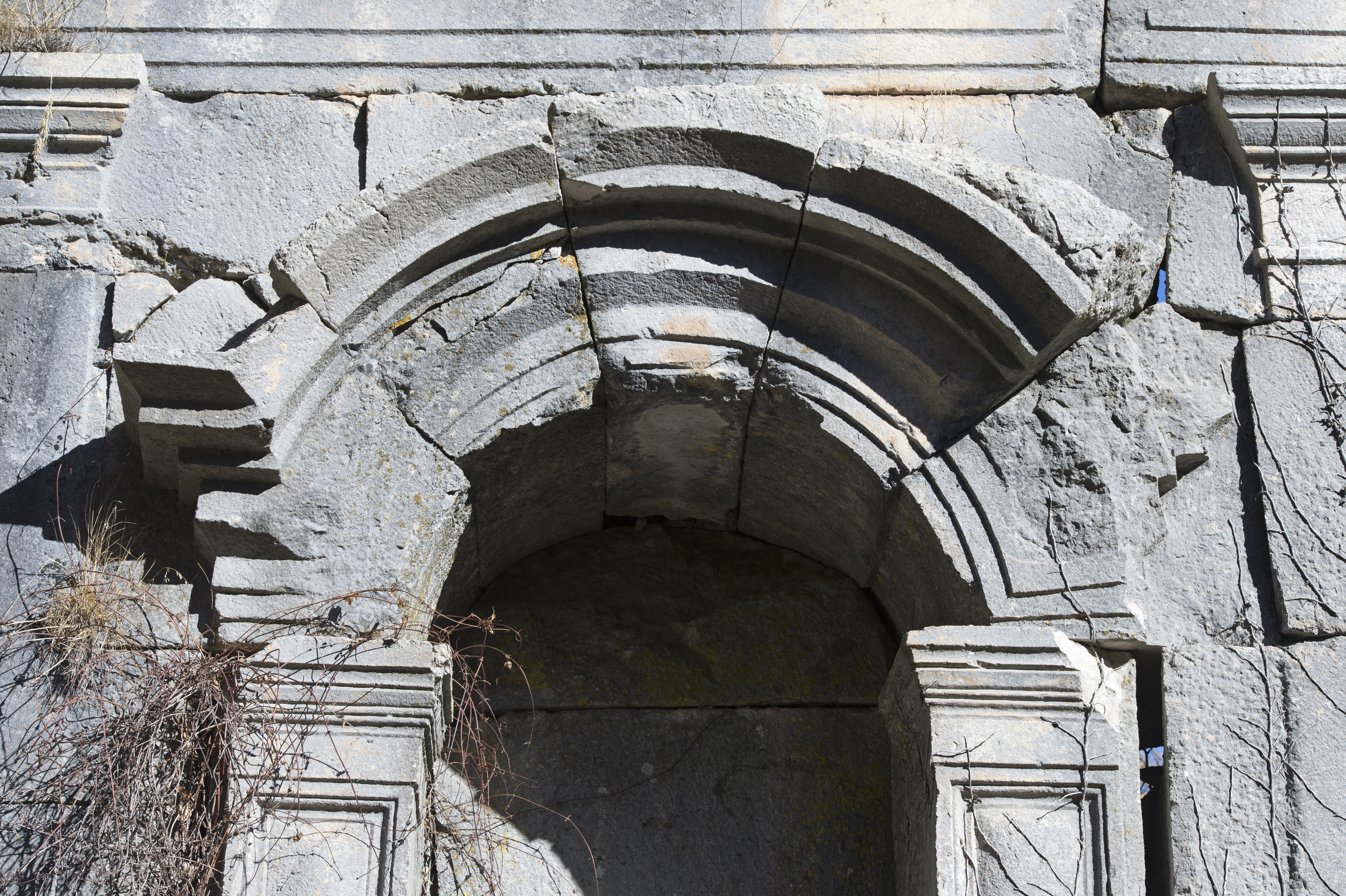
Termessos Gymnasium

=== Theatre ===
Immediately to the east of the agora lies the theatre. Commanding a view out over the Pamphylian plain, this building is notable within the Termessos plain.

It is a Hellenistic theatre later modified in Roman times, preserving its original Greek layout while incorporating distinctive Roman architectural additions such as vaulted entrances, an expanded stage building, and structural integration between the cavea and stage.

The Hellenistic cavea, or semicircular seating area, is divided in two by a diazoma. Above the diazoma rise eight tiers of seats, below it are sixteen, allowing for a seating capacity of some 4–5,000 spectators. A large arched entrance way connects the cavea with the agora. The southern parados was vaulted in Roman times, the northern has been left in its original open-air state. The stage building exhibits features characteristic of the 2nd century AD. A long narrow room is all that lies behind it. This is connected with the podium where the play took place, by five doors piercing the richly ornamented facade or scaenae frons. Under the stage lie five small rooms where wild animals were kept before being taken into the orchestra for combat.

As in other classical cities, an odeon lies about 100 metres from the theatre. This building, which looks like a small theatre, can be dated to the 1st century BC. It is well preserved all the way to roof level and exhibits the finest quality ashlar masonry. The upper storey is ornamented in the Doric order and coursed with square-cut blocks of stone, while the lower storey is unornamented and pierced by two doors. It is certain that the building was originally roofed, since it received its light from eleven large windows in the east and west walls. Just how this roof, which spanned 25 metres, was housed, has not been determined yet. Because the interior is full of earth and rubble at present, it is not possible to gauge either the building's seating arrangement or its capacity. Seating capacity was probably not larger than 600–700. Amid the rubble, pieces of coloured marble have been unearthed, giving rise to the possibility that the interior walls were decorated with mosaic. It is also possible that this elegant building served as the bouleuterion or council chamber.

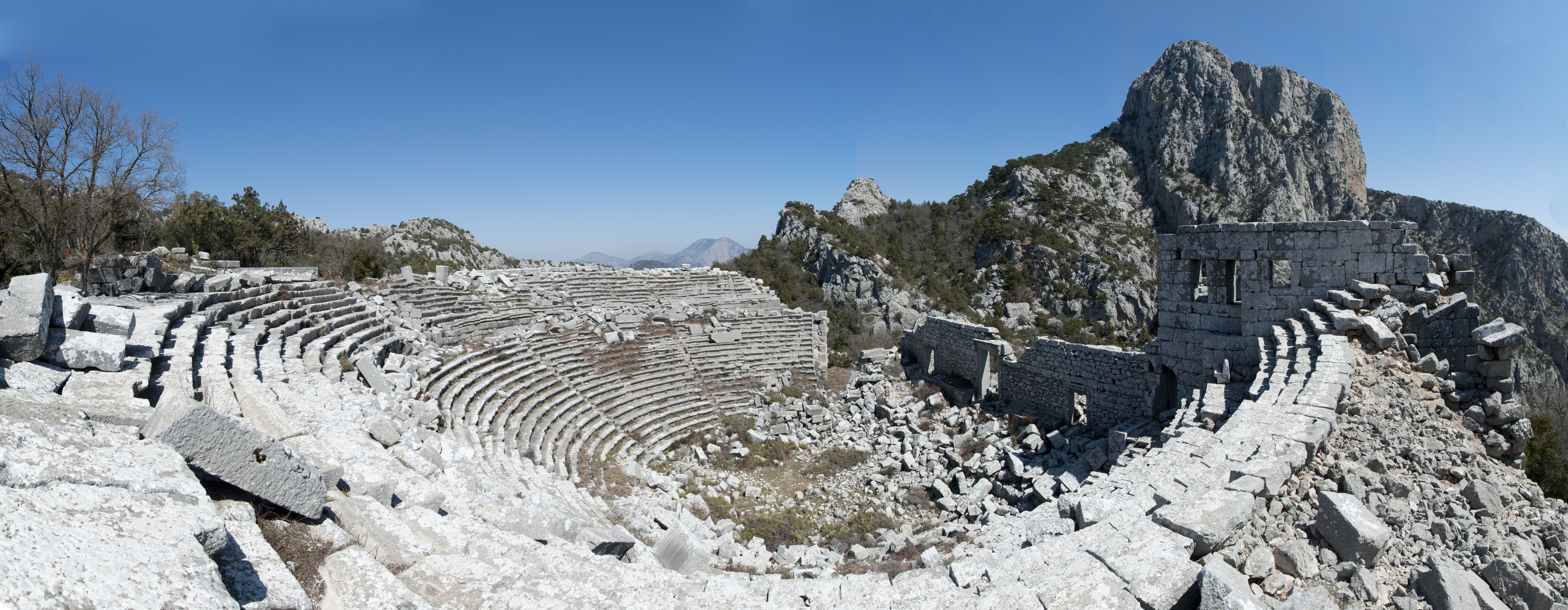
Termessos Theatre Panorama

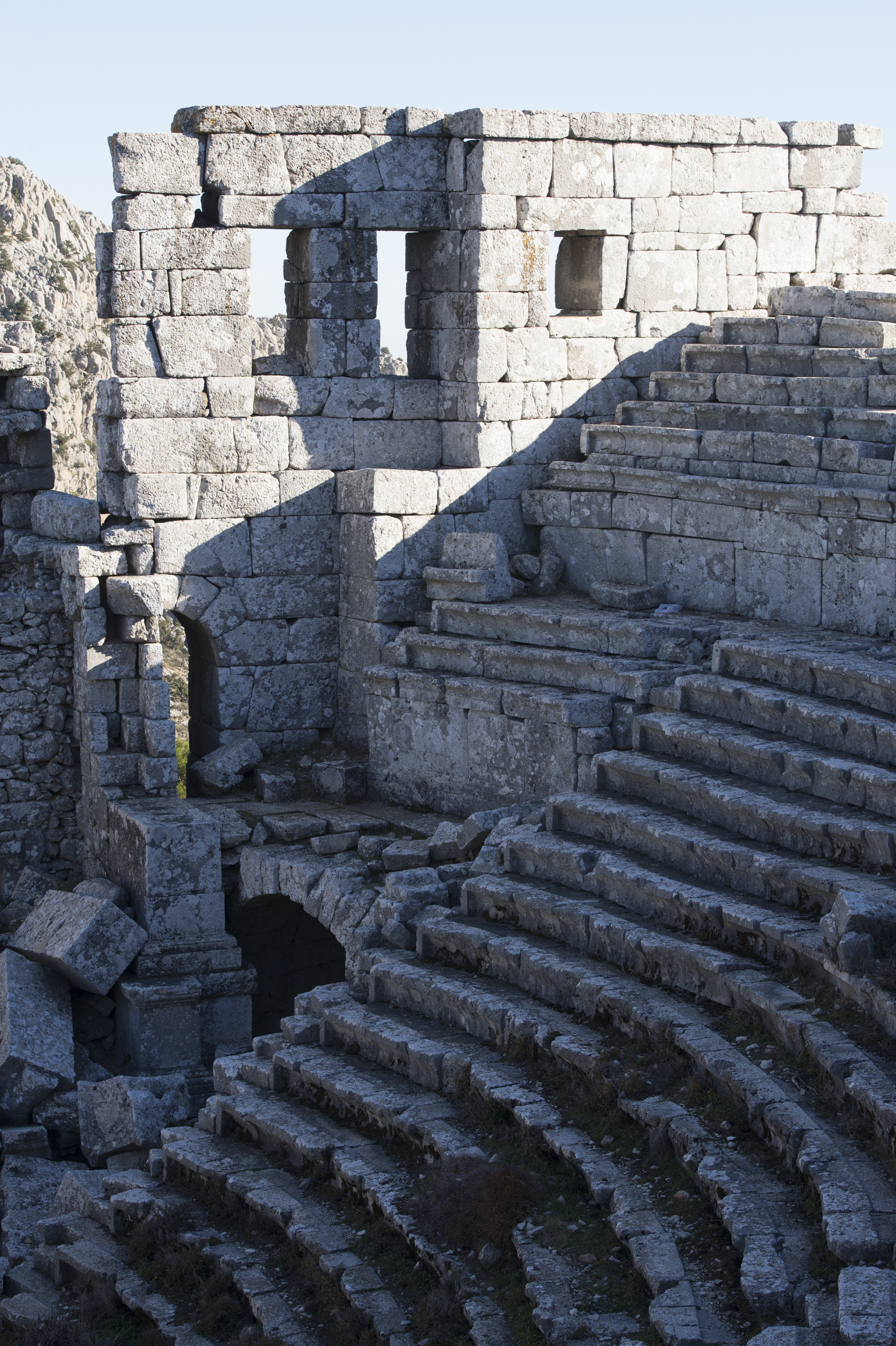
Termessos Theatre

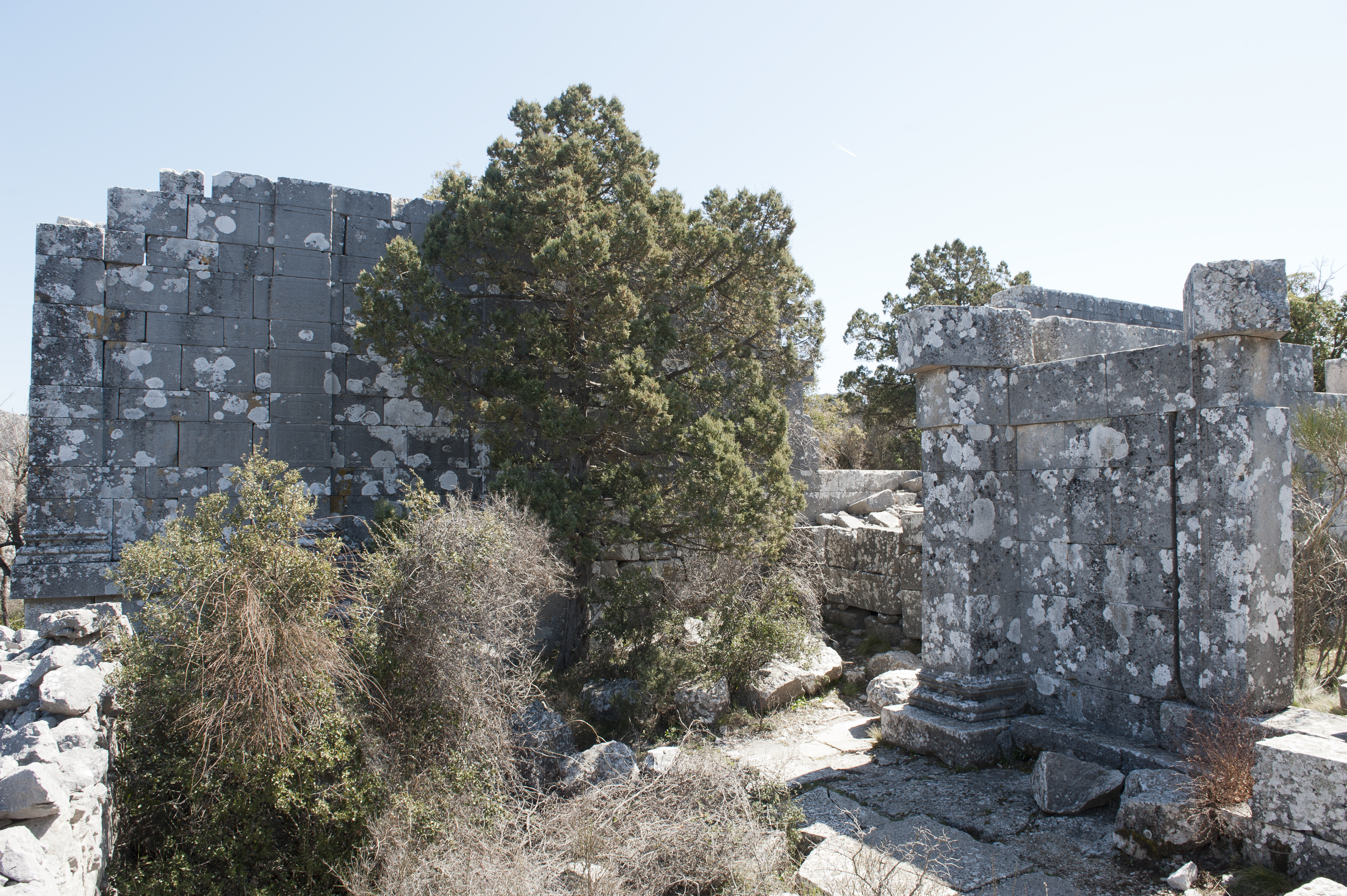
Termessos Odeon

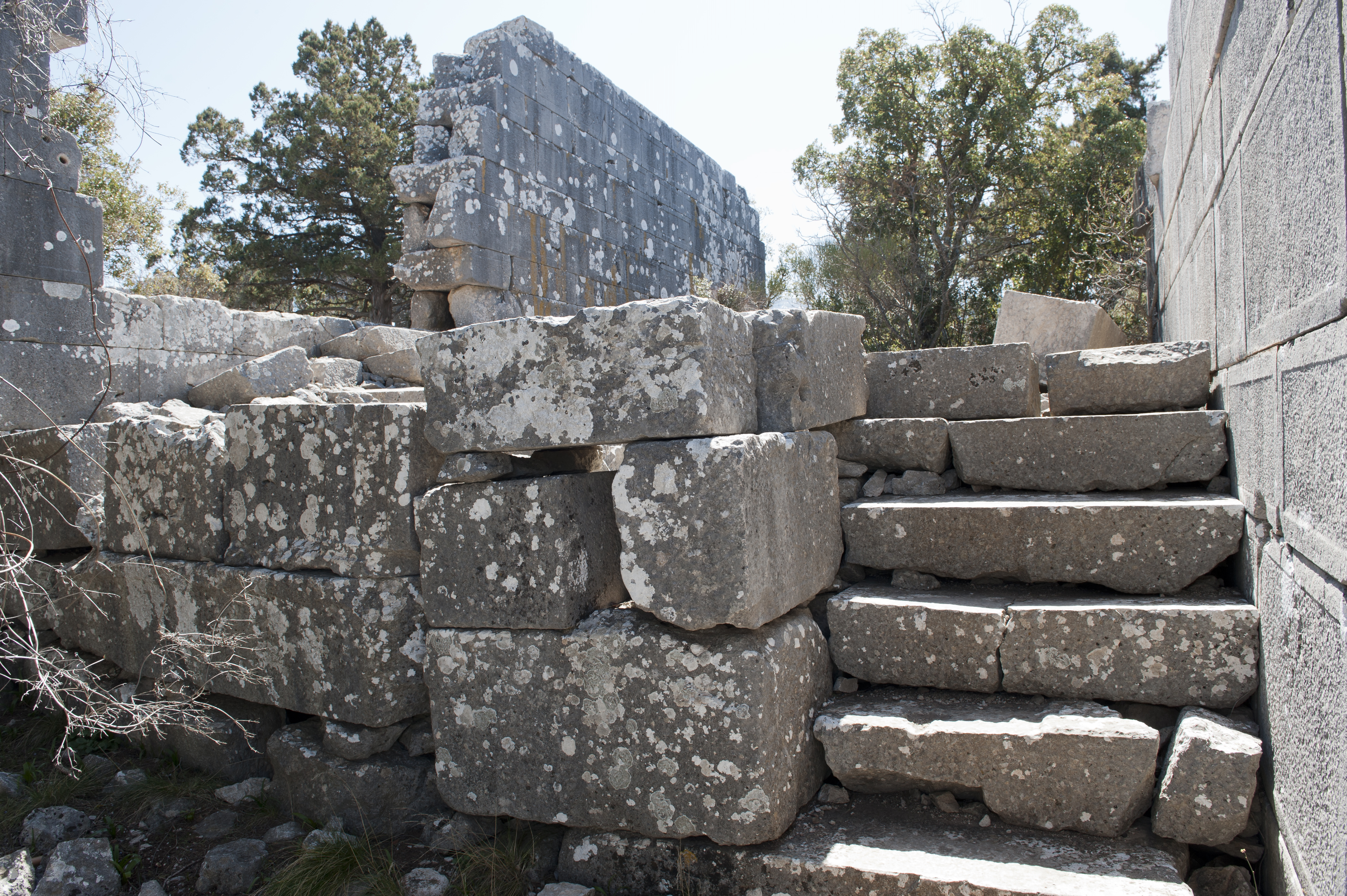
Termessos Odeon

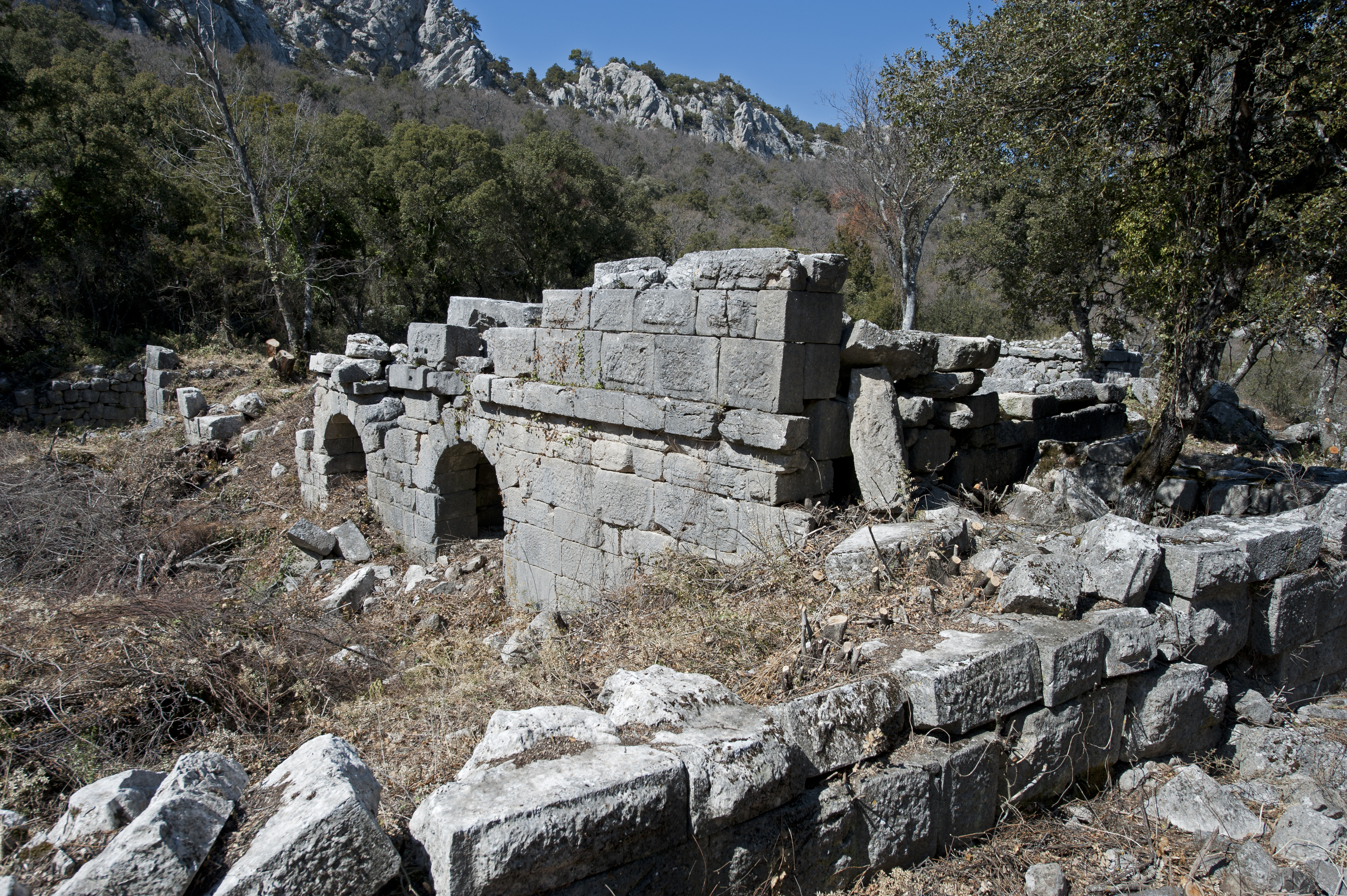
Termessos Unknown structure

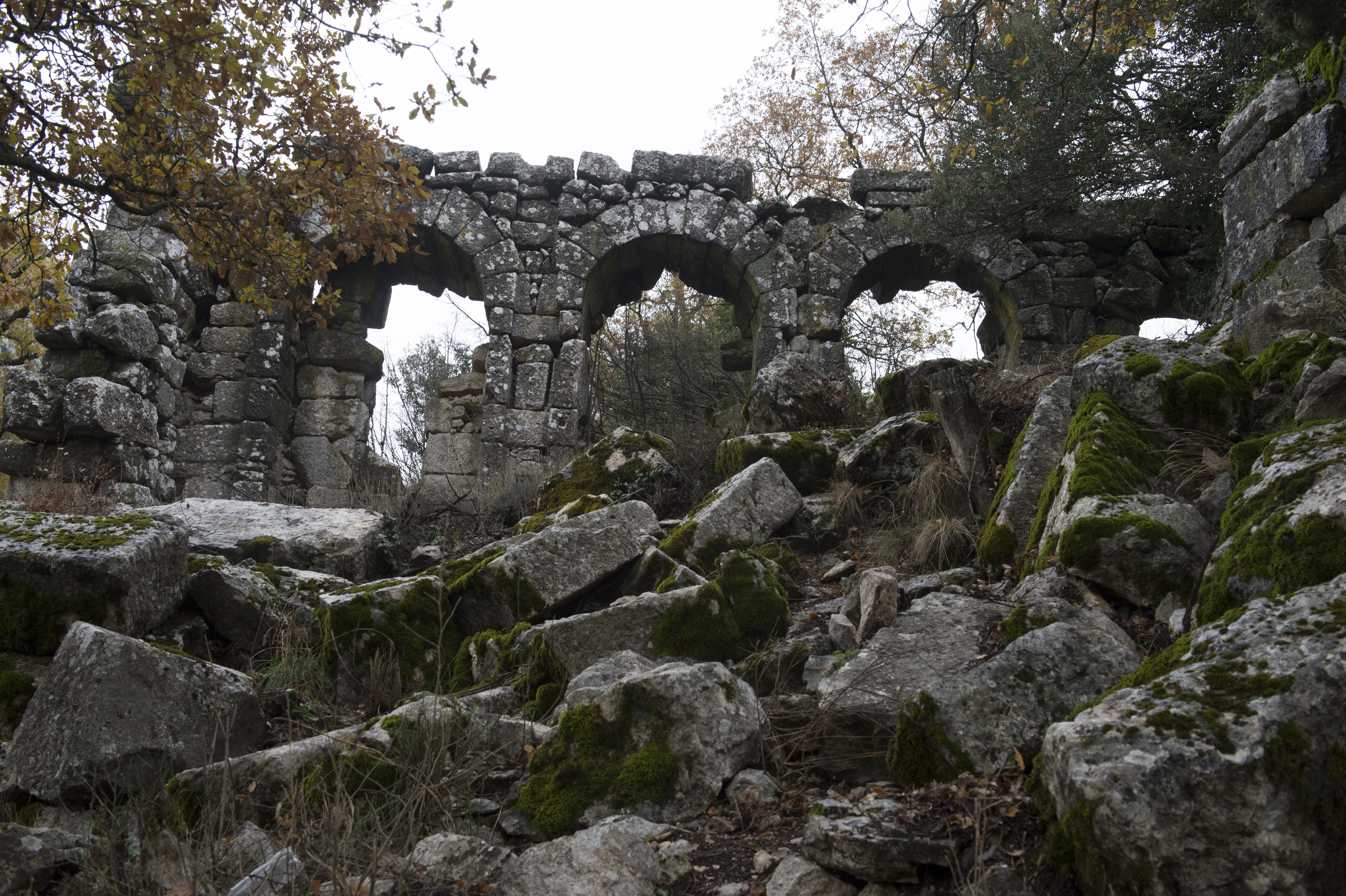
Termessos At colonnaded road

=== Temples ===
Six temples of varying sizes and types have been identified at Termessos. Four are near the odeon in an area that must have been sacred. The first is directly behind the odeon and is constructed of fine masonry. It has been proposed that this was temple of the city's chief god, Zeus Solymeus. Apart from its five-metre-high cella walls, very little remains of this temple.

The second lies near the south-west corner of the odeon. It has a 5.50 × 5.50 metre cella and is of the prostylos type. According to an inscription found on the still complete entrance, this temple was dedicated to Artemis, and both the building and the cult statue inside were paid for by a woman named Aurelia Armasta and her husband, using their own funds. To the other side of this entrance, a statue of this woman's uncle stands on an inscribed base. The temple can be dated on stylistic grounds to the end of the 2nd century AD.

To the east of the Artemis temple are the remains of a peripteral Doric temple with six or eleven columns to a side; it must have been the largest temple in Termessos. Surviving reliefs and inscriptions indictate that it was dedicated to Artemis.

Further to the east, the ruins of a smaller temple lie on a rock-hewn terrace. The temple rose on a high podium, but to what god it was dedicated is not known at present. Contrary to general rules of classical temple architecture, its entrance lies to the right, indicating that it may have belonged to a demi-god or hero. It can be dated to the beginning of the 3rd century AD.

As for the other two temples, they are located near the stoa of Attalos, belong to the Corinthian order, and are of the prostylos type. Also dedicated to deities who are as yet unknown, these temples can be dated to the 2nd or 3rd century AD.

=== Other parts of the city ===
Of all the official and cult buildings to be found in this broad central area, one of the most interesting is in the form of a typical Roman period house. An inscription can be seen above the Doric order doorway along the west wall, which rises to a height of six metres. In this inscription the owner of the house is praised as the founder of the city. Doubtless, this house was not really that of the founder of Termessos. Maybe it was a little gift awarded the owner for extraordinary service rendered to the city. This type of house generally belonged to nobles and plutocrats. The main entrance gives onto a hall which leads through a second entrance to a central courtyard, or atrium. An impluvium or pool designed to catch rainwater lies in the middle of the courtyard. The atrium held an important place in the daily activities of houses such as this, and was also used as a reception room for guests. As such it was often ostentatiously decorated. The other rooms of the house were arranged around the atrium.

A street with wide, shop-lined porticoes ran north–south through the city. The space between the columns of the porticoes was often filled with statues of well-known athletes, most of them wrestlers. The inscribed bases for these statues are still in place, allowing guests to experience the street as it originally was.

=== Cemeteries ===
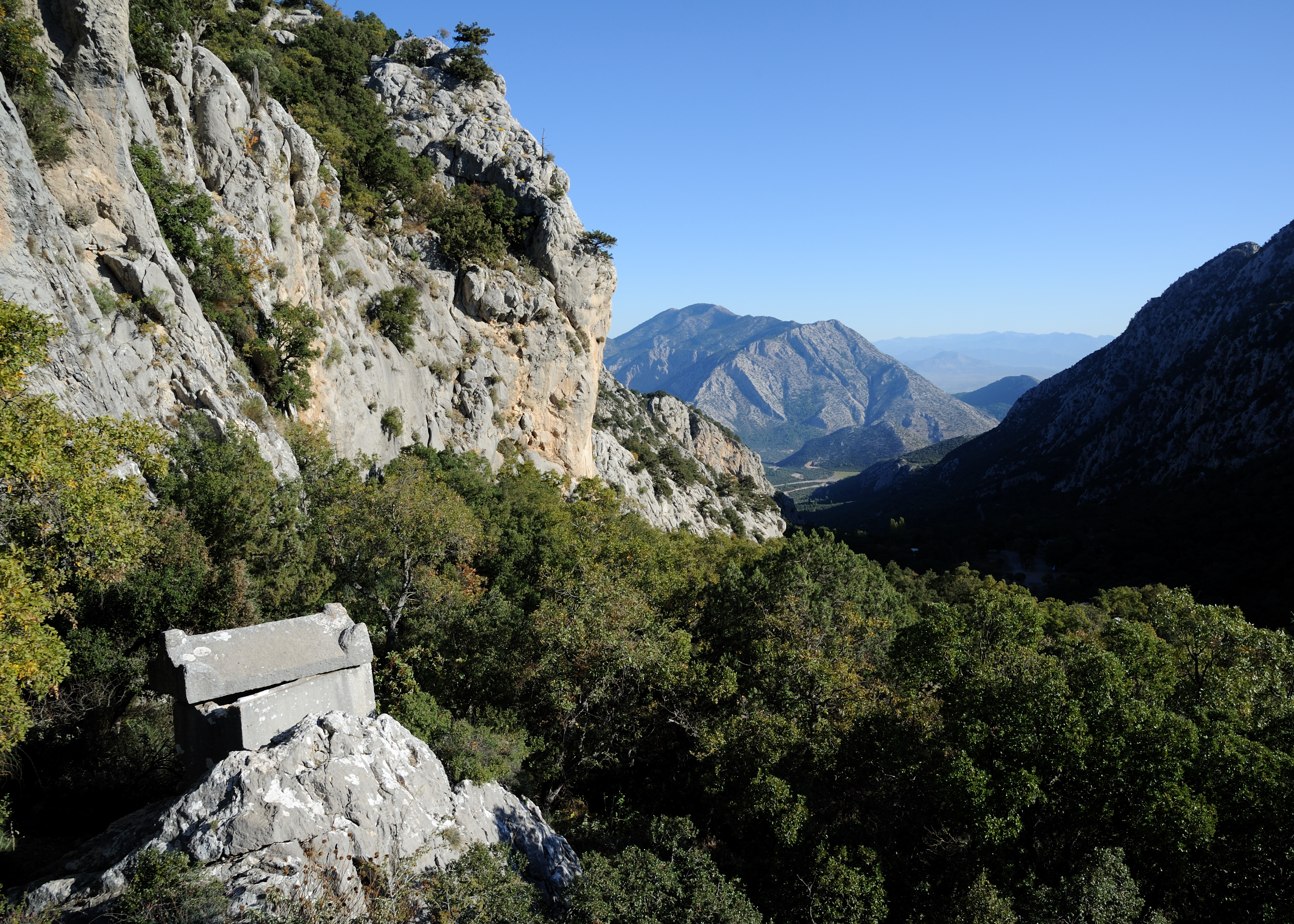
Tomb with a view.

To the south, west and north of the city, mostly within the city walls, there are large cemeteries containing rock-cut tombs, one is supposed to have belonged to Alcetas himself. Unfortunately the tomb has been despoiled by treasure hunters. In the tomb itself a kind of lattice work was carved between the columns behind the kline; at the top there was probably an ornamental frieze. The left part of the tomb is decorated with the depiction of a mounted warrior dateable to the 4th century BC. it is known that the youth of Termessos, much affected by the death of General Alcetas, built a magnificent tomb for him, and the historian Diodoros records that Alcetas did battle with Antigonos while mounted on a horse. These coincidences suggest that this is indeed the tomb of Alcetas and that it is he who is depicted in the relief.

The sarcophagi, hidden for centuries among a dense growth of trees south-west of the city, transports one in an instant to the depths of history ceremony, the dead were placed in these sarcophagi along with their clothing, jewellery, and other rich accouterments. The bodies of the poor were buried in simple stone, clay, or wooden sarcophagi. Dateable to the 2nd and 3rd centuries AD, these sarcophagi generally rest on a high pedestal. In the family tombs of the wealthy on the other hand, the sarcophagi were placed inside a richly ornamented structure built in the shape of the deceased together with his lineage, or the names of those given permission to be buried alongside him. Thus the right of usage was officially guaranteed. In this manner the history of one specific tomb can be ascertained. In addition, one finds inscriptions calling on the fury of the gods to prevent the sarcophagi from being opened and to scare away grave robbers. The inscriptions also state the fines meted out to those who did not conform to these rules. These fines, ranging from 300 to 100,000 denarii and generally paid to the city treasury in the name of Zeus Solymeus, took the place of legal judgments.

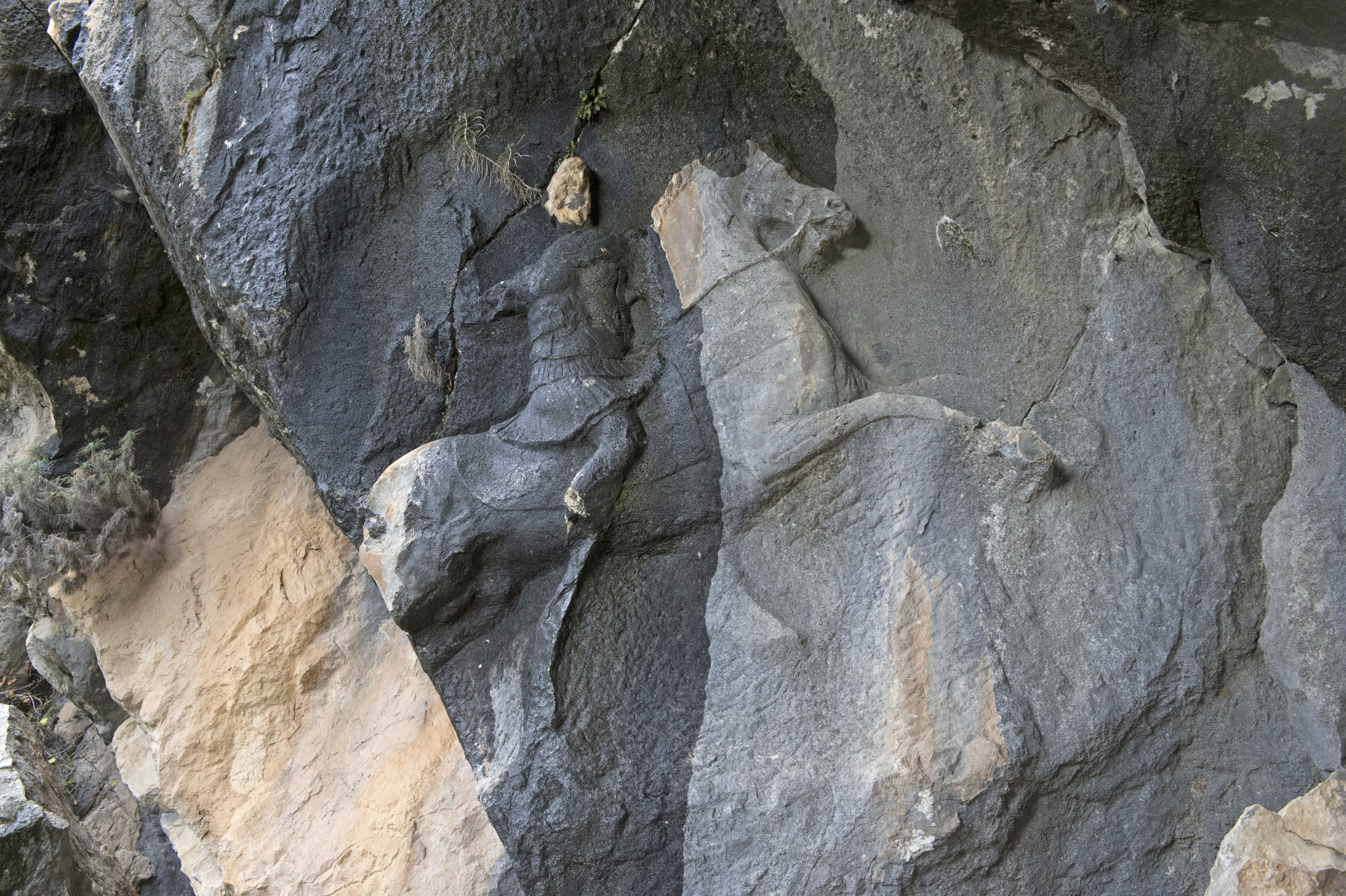
Termessos Alcetas grave Horseman

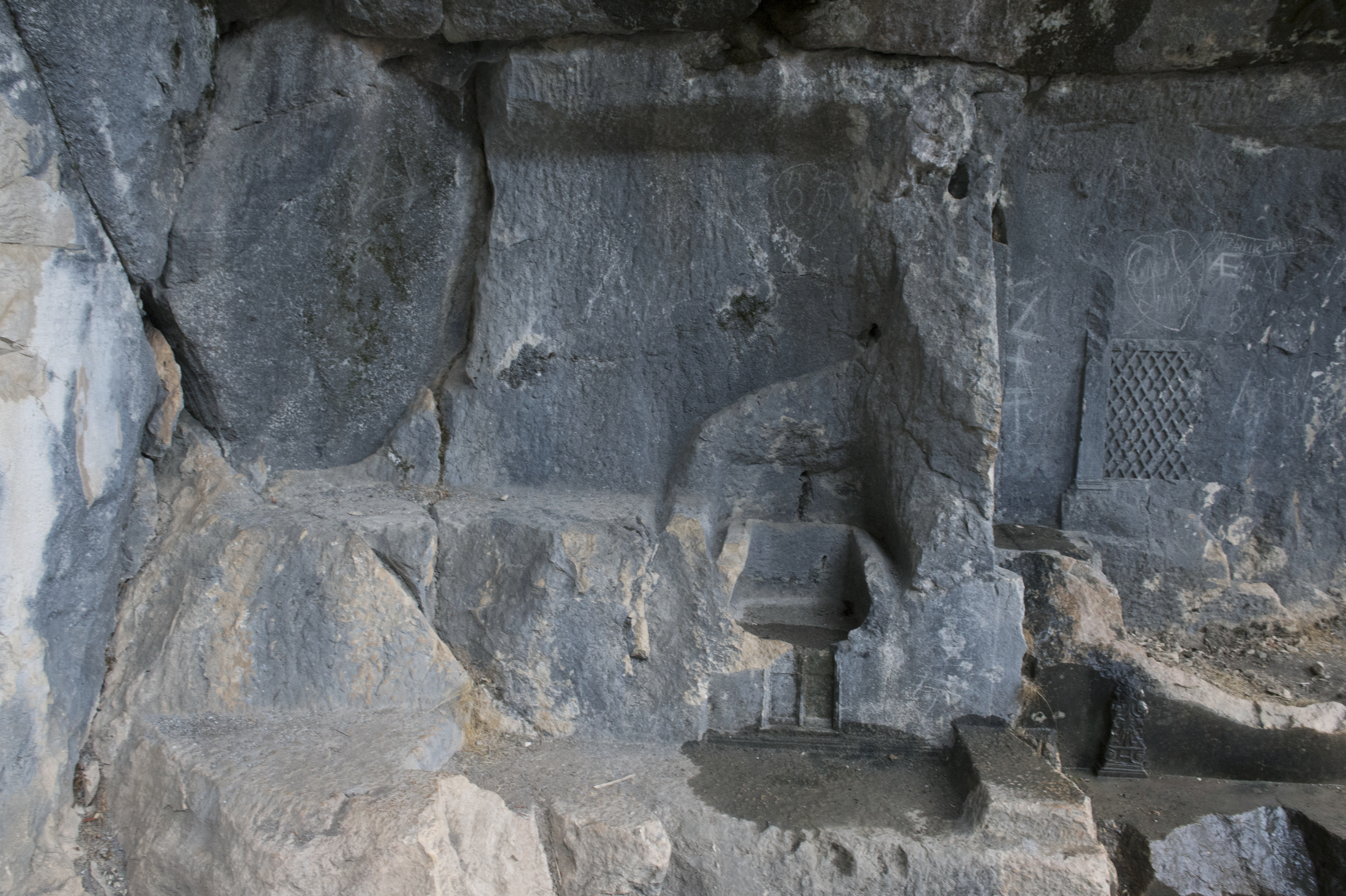
Termessos Alcetas grave site

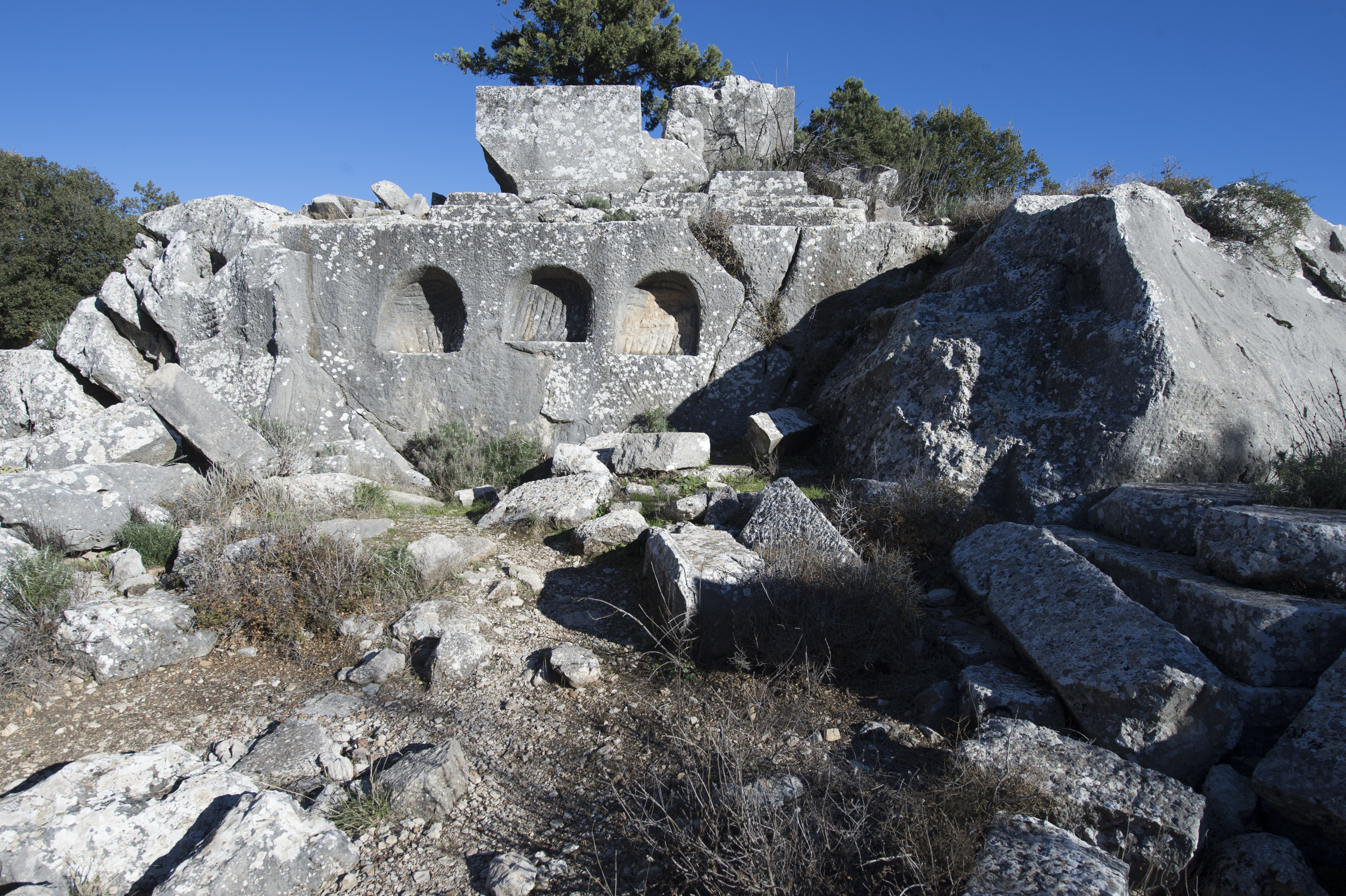
Termessos Heroon

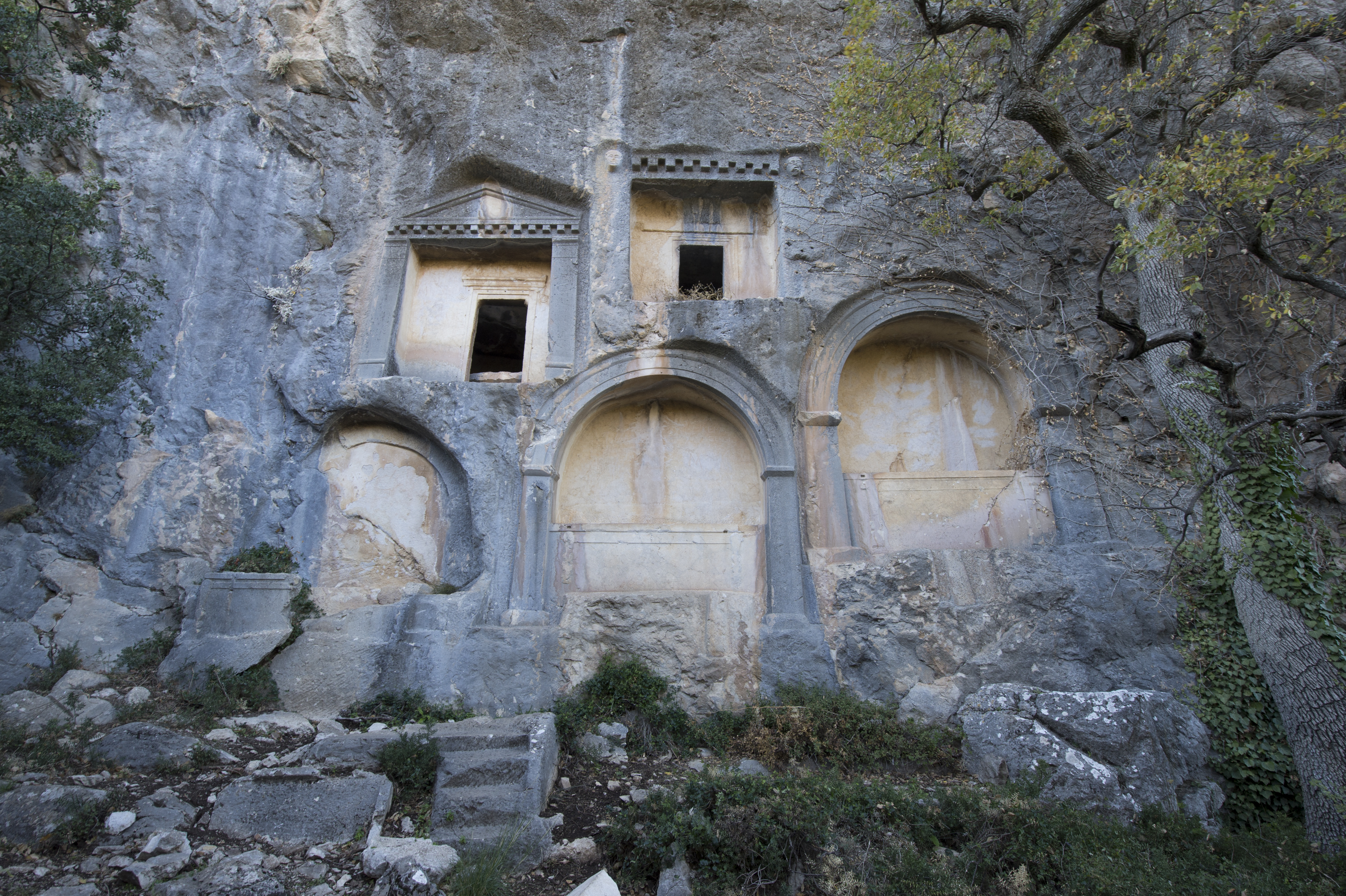
Termessos Alcetas rock graves

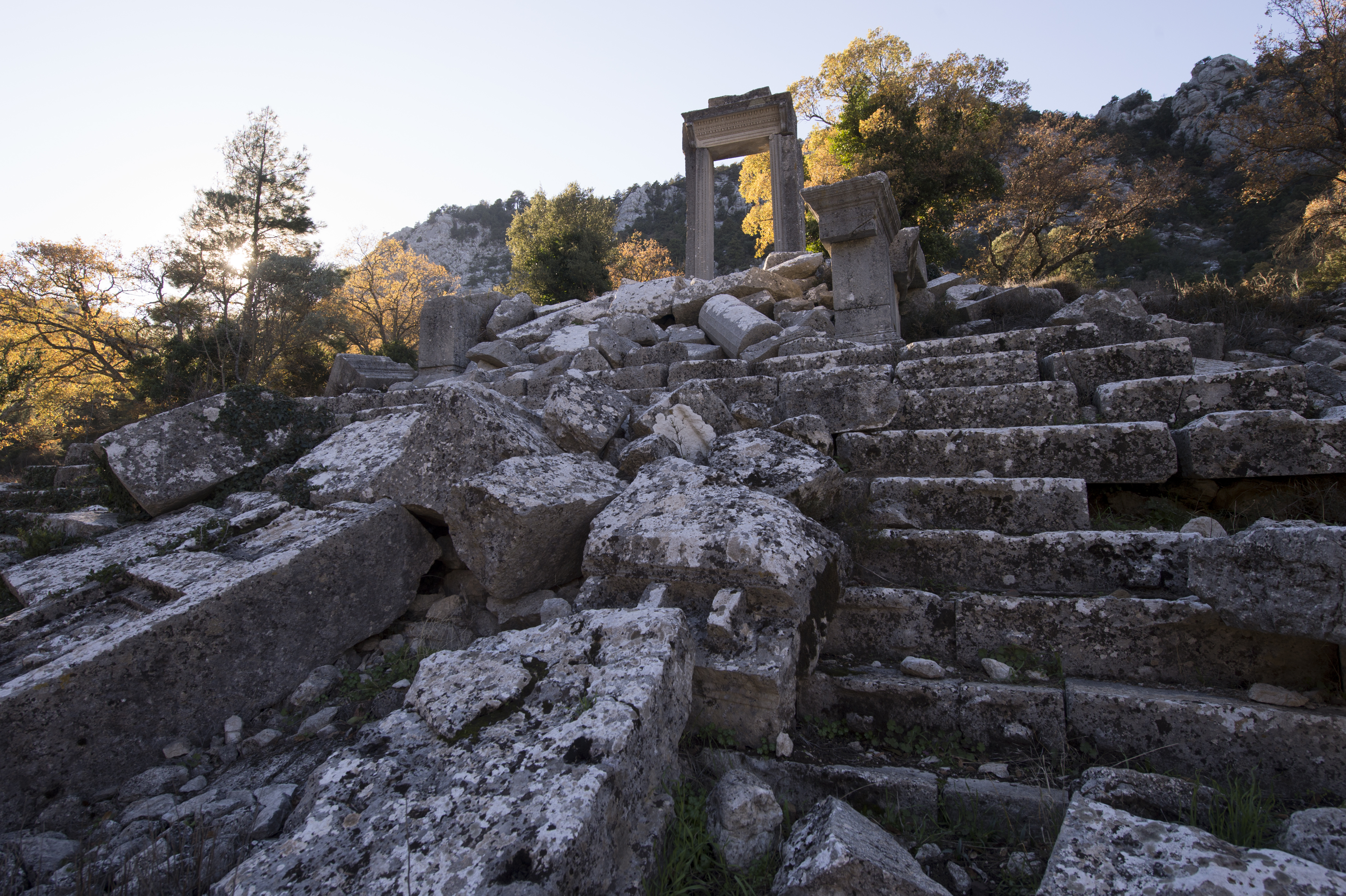
Temple of Hadrian

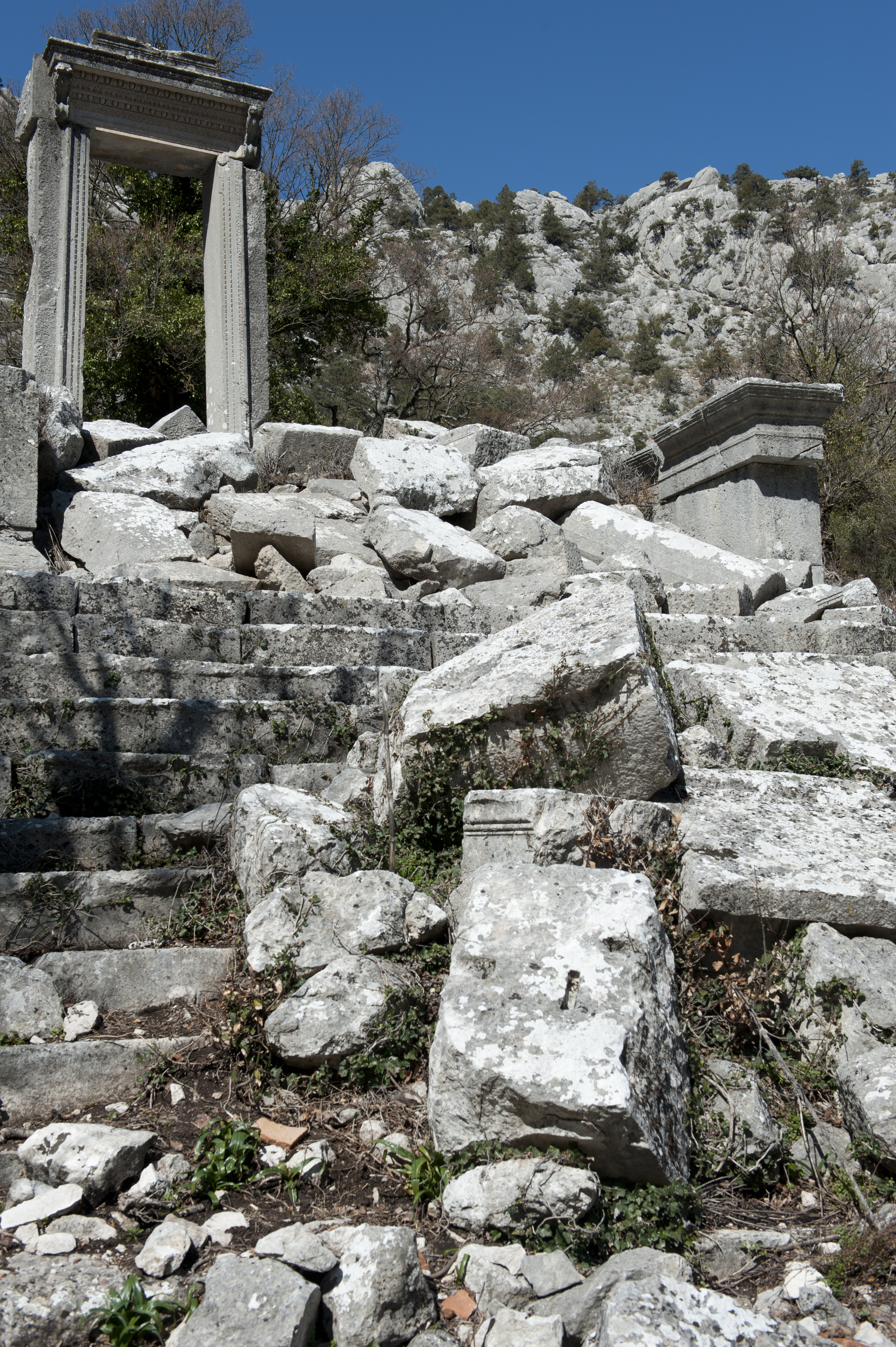
Temple of Hadrian

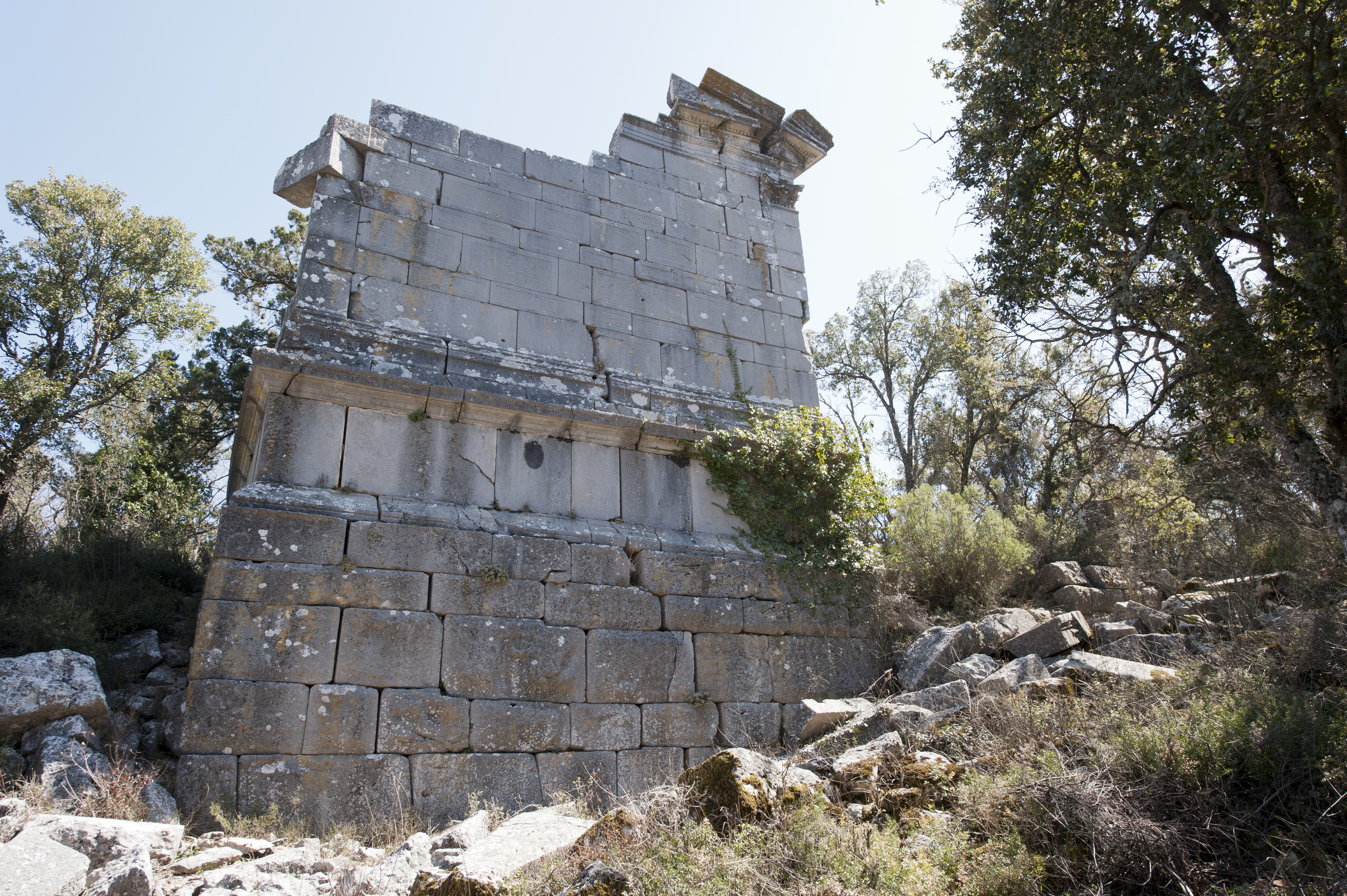
Termessos Corinthian temple

Termessos, after a gradual decline, was finally abandoned in the 5th century. Some of the remains found there are the walls, the Hadrian's triumphal arch, the cisterns, the theater, the gymnasium, the agora, the odeon and the heroon. Among the tombs which are scattered far and wide can be seen those of Alcates, Agatemeros and the Lion decorated sarcophagi, which are extraordinary.

No excavations have as yet been undertaken at Termessos.
