= Mount Güllük-Termessos National Park =

National park in Antalya, Turkey (1970)

- Güllük Dağı-Termessos Milli Parkı
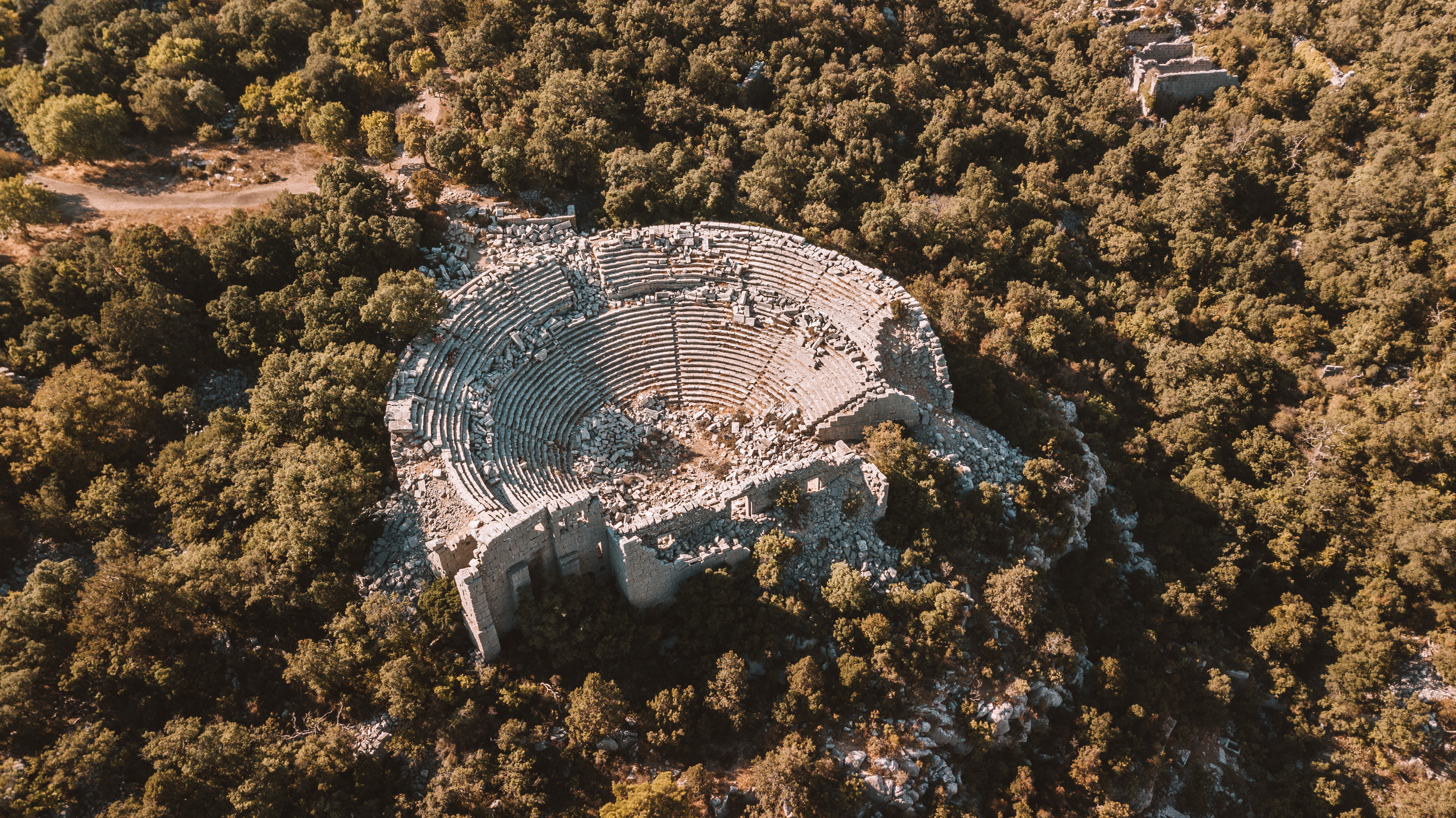
- Ancient theater of Termessos

- Location within Turkey
- Location: Korkuteli, Antalya Province, Turkey
- Nearest city: Antalya
- Coordinates: 36°59′18″N 30°28′04″E
- Area: 67,020 daa (67.02 km^{2}; 25.88 sq mi)
- Max. elevation: 1,665 m (5,463 ft)
- Min. elevation: 250 m (820 ft)
- Established: 3 November 1970; 55 years ago
- Governing body: Ministry of Forest and Water Management
- Website: www.milliparklar.gov.tr/mp/termessos/index.htm

Mount Güllük-Termessos National Park (Turkish: Güllük Dağı-Termessos Milli Parkı), established in 1970, is a national park located in Antalya Province, southwestern Turkey.

== Overview ==
The national park is located in Korkuteli district of Antalya Province, northwest of Antalya, 23 km (14 mi) in the Düzlerçamı direction from 30 km (19 mi) on the Antalyal-Burdur highway D-650.

Established on 3 November 1970, the national park covers an area of 67,020 daa (67.02 km^{2}; 25.88 sq mi). Rising from the travertine plains of Antalya, Mount Güllük contains the ruins of the ancient city of Termessos, founded by the Solymoi, one of the indigenous peoples of Anatolia. In the ancient city that has survived to this day, the most important works include tombs from the Hellenistic period, the royal road from the Roman period, agora, theater, cisterns, walls, towers, and a drainage system. In the region, where hills, valleys, and canyons are often found, there is the Mecene Strait, which reaches a depth of 600 m (2,000 ft).

== Fauna and flora ==
The national park, with an elevation difference of 250–1,665 m (820–5,463 ft), hosts a rich flora and fauna as well as historical values. The region is the habitat of the fallow deer, which is an extinct endangered species. It is also home to mammals such as mountain goats, caracals, lynxes, stone martens, foxes, rabbits, squirrels, badgers, hedgehogs, bats, and rare predators such as Eastern imperial eagles and songbirds. The endemic plant species in the national park, covered with red pine forests and maquis plant communities, also add special importance and value to the biodiversity of the region.

== Activities ==
The national park, where camping and picnicking are possible, hosts tens of thousands of visitors every year. The best time to visit is between April and December. The national park contains the Mount Güllük Interactive Natural History Museum, Turkey's first interactive nature museum, where the plant and animal species specific to the region can be examined, accompanied by technological applications.

== See also ==
- Termessos
- Altınbeşik Cave National Park
- Beydağları Coastal National Park
- Köprülü Canyon National Park
- Saklıkent National Park
