= Lycae =

Ancient Lycian town

Coordinates: 36°44′19″N 30°07′48″E

Lycae or Lykai (Ancient Greek: Λύκαι) was a town of ancient Lycia, located 60 stadia (11 km) from Kitanaura.

Its site is located on a hill near Ovacık, Asiatic Turkey. Ancient remains include a tower and sarcophagi.
