= Solymoi =

Ancient indigenous people of Anatolia

The Solymoi (Ancient Greek: Σόλυμοι, also known as Solymians) were an ancient indigenous people of southwestern Anatolia. They are considered one of the earliest known populations of the regions that would later become known as Lycia, Milyas, and Pisidia. Renowned for their martial prowess and mountain strongholds, the Solymoi are most famously recorded in Greek mythology and the historical accounts of antiquity, most notably as the original founders of the heavily fortified city of Termessos.

== Origins ==
The exact ethnic origins of the Solymoi remain a subject of historical and archaeological study, but they are widely recognized as an autochthonous, or indigenous, population of Anatolia. Classical historians documented them as the original inhabitants of the southern coastal regions before the arrival of migrating groups. According to Herodotus, the Solymoi occupied the territory that was later called Lycia. When the Termilae, the ancestors of the Lycians, arrived from the island of Crete, they displaced the Solymoi and pushed them further inland into the mountainous region of Milyas. Modern scholars suggest they may have been related to the broader Luwian speaking populations that dominated southern Anatolia during the Bronze Age.

== Mythology and early history ==
The Solymoi first appear in classical literature in the epic poetry of Homer. In the Iliad, the hero Bellerophon is sent on a seemingly impossible mission by the king of Lycia to battle the "glorious Solymi," who are described as fierce and formidable warriors.

Roman authors corroborated this deep rooted presence, with Pliny the Elder specifically identifying the native inhabitants of Pisidia as the Solymi.

== Culture and geography ==
The core of Solymian territory eventually centered around Mount Solymos, known today as Güllük Dağı in modern Turkey. At an altitude of over 1000 meters on the southwestern slopes of this mountain, they founded their most prominent and defensible settlement: Termessos. This city was virtually impregnable, famously defying even Alexander the Great during his conquests.

The Solymoi possessed their own unique language. The geographer Strabo noted that the Solymian language was one of the four distinct languages spoken in the Kibyran tetrapolis region, alongside Pisidian, Greek, and Lydian. Although the Solymian language was eventually absorbed as the region became Hellenized, remnants survived in local personal names and religious inscriptions.

Religion played a central role in their culture. They worshipped a chief Anatolian mountain deity named Solymeus. As the Solymoi integrated more closely with the broader Greek and Roman world, this local god became syncretized with the Greek pantheon, resulting in the prominent regional cult of Zeus Solymeus. Temples and inscriptions dedicated to Zeus Solymeus have been heavily documented throughout the ruins of Termessos. For instance, archaeological surveys of the Termessos necropolis revealed Roman era funerary inscriptions where fines for tomb violations, amounting to exactly 1000 drakhmai, were mandated to be paid directly to the temple treasury of Zeus Solymeus.

== Assimilation and decline ==
The end of the Solymoi as a distinct ethnic and cultural entity was a gradual process of assimilation rather than a sudden military defeat. Following the campaigns of Alexander the Great, the region underwent intense Hellenization. The Solymoi adopted the Greek language, civic structures, and cultural practices.

During the Roman Republic, Termessos remained powerful and even secured a formal alliance with Rome in 71 BC, known as the Lex Antonia de Termessibus, which guaranteed their independence and laws. However, as the centuries passed under Roman rule, the native Solymian identity faded into the broader provincial culture of the Roman Empire. By the third century AD, the unique language and distinct tribal identity had vanished. The final physical end of their civilization occurred when a massive earthquake severed the aqueduct system supplying water to Termessos, forcing the complete abandonment of the mountaintop city they had defended for centuries.
