= Flag of Tuscany =

- Proportion: 2:3
- Adopted: 3 February 1995
- Design: A white field with a silver Pegasus rampant in the center between two red horizontal bands.

The flag of Tuscany is the official flag of the region of Tuscany, Italy. The flag depicts a silver winged horse rampant on a white field between two horizontal red bands. The flag first appeared as a gonfalon on 20 May 1975 along with accompanying text Regione Toscana above the Pegasus. It was officially adopted as the flag of Tuscany on 3 February 1995.

== History ==
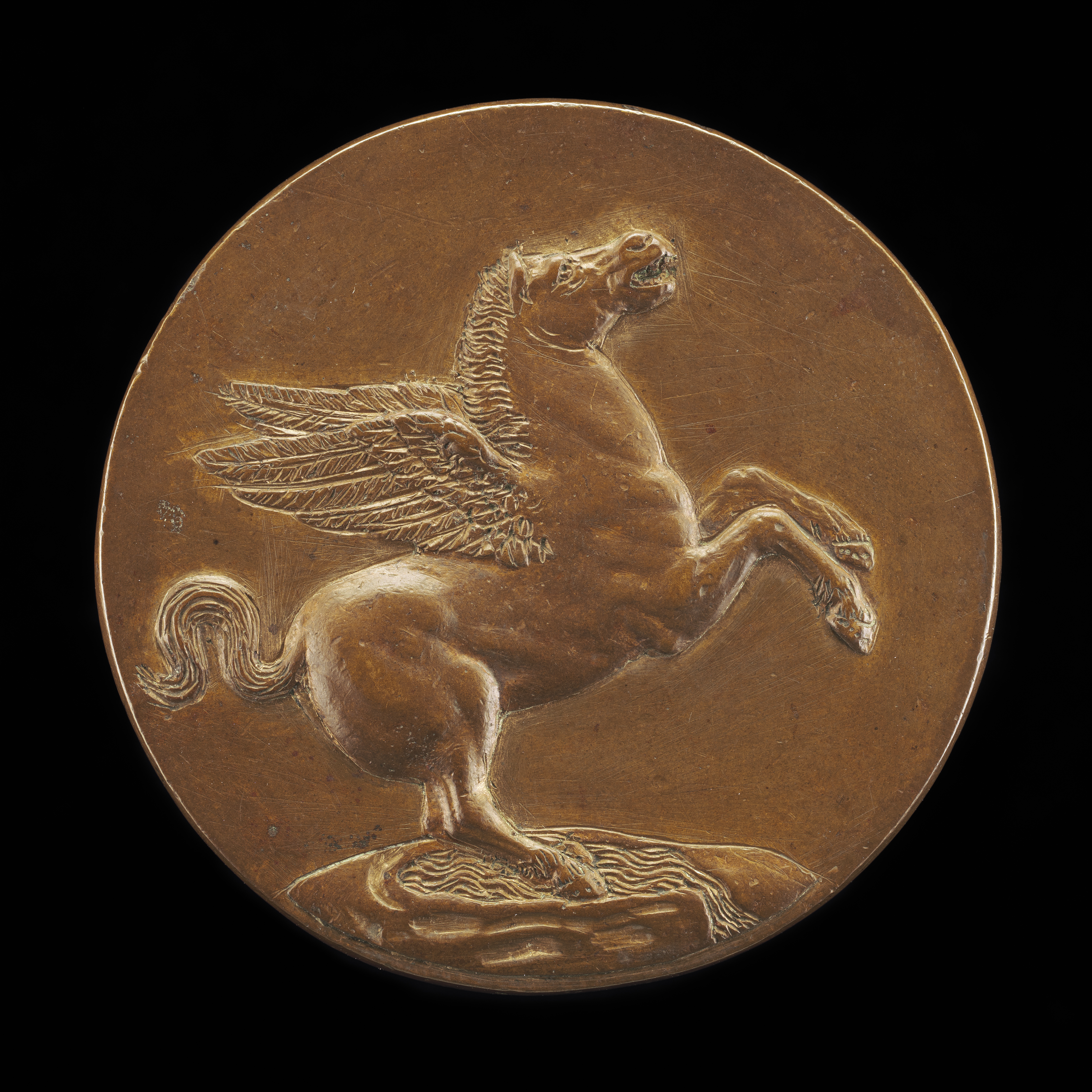
Benvenuto Cellini's 1537 coin.

The Pegasus image on the flag derives from a coin made by the Florentine artist Benvenuto Cellini in 1537. This coin was created by Cellini in order to honour Cardinal Pietro Bembo. Bembo was instrumental in the development of the Tuscan language as a literary medium and was honoured with the representation of Pegasus due to its symbolism and ties with creation. As a result, the Pegasus came to be associated as a symbol of the Tuscan region.

The usage of Pegasus by the Tuscan region endured and was adopted by the Tuscan Committee of National Liberation (CTLN) as a symbol of Italian resistance in Tuscany to the German occupation of Italy during the Second World War.

On 11 August 1975, the 26th anniversary of the liberation of Florence, the flag of the CTLN was symbolically handed over to the President of Tuscany, Lelio Lagorio by the mayor of Florence, Elio Gabbuggiani, in a ceremony at the Palazzo Vecchio. This demonstrated the symbolic adoption of the flag of Tuscany by the region. However, the flag was not officially recognised.

The flag was officially adopted in 1995 following President Oscar Luigi Scalfaro's call for the flag of each Italian region to be represented in the Quirinale Palace. The usage of the Pegasus was favoured by the Tuscan Regional Council over a depiction of Leonardo da Vinci's Vitruvian Man, as this was considered unsuitable to be reproduced simply.

The flag is often seen flying outside of Tuscan governmental buildings throughout the region. The seat of the Tuscan Regional Government, Palazzo Capponi-Covoni, is known as the Palazzo del Pegaso in reference to the flag. The flag also features on the sash used by the President of Tuscany to distinguish them from other members of the council.

=== Republic of Pisa ===
The Republic of Pisa was an independent state centered on the Tuscan city of Pisa, which existed from the 11th to the 15th century. It rose to become an economic powerhouse, a commercial center whose merchants dominated Mediterranean and Italian trade for a century, before being surpassed and superseded by the Republic of Genoa.

==== First flag ====
1162–1406

The flag was awarded together with the coat of arms of the republic by Frederick Barbarossa in 1162. The city was consistently loyal to the empire and had a fully red flag and coat of arms. The shape of the flag is uncertain and may not even have been standardized. This flag has been in force throughout the history of the state.

==== Second flag ====
from 13th century

It is not known under what circumstances or when exactly the cross was added, but it is supposed to have happened in the 13th century, probably in the second half. It is also not known if it has any connection with a similar Occitan cross. In 1406, when Pisa lost its independence, the flag remained as an insignia of the commune and is still the flag of the city to this day. It also appears on Italian coats of arms and nautical insignia, along with the emblems of the other great maritime republics of Venice, Genoa and Amalfi.

=== Republic of Siena ===
The Republic of Siena was a historic state consisting of the city of Siena. It existed for over 400 years, from 1125 to 1555. During its existence, it gradually expanded throughout southern Tuscany becoming one of the major economic powers of the Middle Ages, and one of the most important commercial, financial and artistic centers in Europe. In the Italian War of 1551–1559 the republic was defeated by the rival Republic of Florence in alliance with the Spanish crown. After 18 months of resistance, the Republic of Siena surrendered on 21 April 1555, marking the end of the republic.

c. 1246

13th century

The exact appearance of the municipal flag is undetermined. The earliest evidence of its existence is recorded in the Biccherna on the purchase of black and white fabrics to make 77 banners. The city of Siena uses this flag to this day.

The famous fresco in the Palazzo Pubblico in Siena "Guidoriccio da Fogliano at the Siege of Montemassi" (1328), attributed to Simone Martini, shows the black and white flags of the Siena military camps and captured castles fluttering with the flags of the commune. They are divided vertically with three tails.

=== Republic of Florence ===
The Republic of Florence was a state that was centered on the Italian city of Florence in Tuscany. The republic originated in 1115, when the Florentine people rebelled against the Margraviate of Tuscany upon the death of Matilda of Tuscany, who controlled vast territories that included Florence. The Florentines formed a commune in her successors' place. Cosimo I, established a strong Florentine navy and expanded his territory, conquering Siena in 1555. In 1569, the Pope declared Cosimo the first Duke of Tuscany. The Medici ruled the Grand Duchy of Tuscany until 1737.

State flag of Republic of Florence

Civil flag of Republic of Florence

After the founding of the Duchy of Florence, the state flag became obsolete and the civil flag became the flag of the city of florence.

=== Grand Duchy of Tuscany ===
The Grand Duchy of Tuscany was an Italian monarchy that existed, with interruptions, from 1569 to 1859, replacing the Republic of Florence. The grand duchy's capital was Florence. Having brought nearly all Tuscany under his control after conquering the Republic of Siena, Cosimo I de' Medici, was elevated by a papal bull of Pope Pius V to Grand Duke of Tuscany on 27 August 1569. The Grand Duchy was ruled by the House of Medici until the extinction of its senior branch in 1737. Francis Stephen of Lorraine, a cognatic descendant of the Medici, succeeded the family and ascended the throne of his Medicean ancestors. Tuscany was governed by a viceroy, Marc de Beauvau-Craon, for his entire rule. His descendants ruled, and resided in, the grand duchy until its end in 1859, barring one interruption, when Napoleon Bonaparte gave Tuscany to the House of Bourbon-Parma (Kingdom of Etruria, 1801–7). Following the collapse of the Napoleonic system in 1814, the grand duchy was restored. The United Provinces of Central Italy, a client state of the Kingdom of Sardinia, annexed Tuscany in 1859. Tuscany was formally annexed to Sardinia in 1860, as a part of the unification of Italy.

==== First flag ====
1532–1737

Naval flag 1562–1737

Civil ensign 17th century–1737

The state flag and the Medici banner, adopted in a stable form for the institutions of the Grand Duchy, survived until the accession of the throne to the House of Lorraine. The Medici shield, whose origin is lost in legend, has red spheres on a golden field and on top, a sixth blue ball with three French lilies, donated by King Louis XI to Piero di Cosimo de' Medici in 1466. The shield appears flanked by the chain of the Order of the Golden Fleece (added in 1548) and with the Cross of the Order of Saint Stephen (present since 1562, when the Order was founded). The crown is Florentine in shape with a red lily in the center, an ancient symbol of Florence (1251).

During the Medici period, the Tuscan navy identified itself with the fleet of the Order of Santo Stefano. The official flag raised by the galleys was red with yellow borders with the Cross of the Order in the center in a white circle. It appeared after 1562 (the year of the founding of the order) and probably lasted until the end of the Medici rule.

The flag known as "Livorno", for commercial use, used from the 17th century and probably survived until 1737. It comes from the flag of the Order of Saint Stephen, it is represented in many varieties and with different additions. The correct drawing is most likely the one shown here, taken from the Dutch manuscript reissued by K. Sierksma of the Flags of the World 1669-1670, with the Stefan cross surrounded by all the Medici balls.

==== Second flag ====
Naval flag c. 1737 – c. 1749

Flag for commercial use, used in the first half of the 18th century, possibly between the advent of Lorraine (1737) and the introduction of imperial flags by Francis II (1749). The origin and meaning are unknown, but it probably has to do with the Cross of the Order of Saint Stephen.

==== Third flag ====
1749–1765

The state and navy flag adopted around 1749 and replaced in 1765. Francesco II, Grand Duke of Tuscany and husband of Maria Theresa, became Emperor in 1745.

==== Fourth flag ====
State flag (1765–1800, 1815–1848, 1849–1860)

Civil ensign (1781–1800 1815–1848, 1849–1860)

Civil ensign (1824–1848, 1849–1860)

Austrian flag adorned with the coat of arms introduced in 1765 with the accession to the throne of Grand Duke Pietro Leopoldo. This flag lasted until the end of Tuscany's independence, but with two breaks during the Napoleonic period (1800-1814) and a short constitutional period (1848–1849). It was finally lowered and replaced with the Italian tricolor in May 1859. The shield, topped, was quartered with the coat of arms of Hungary, Bohemia, Burgundy and Bar, the entire shield with the coat of arms of Lorraine, Austria and the Medici. The Great Coat of Arms had different versions on the flags, with differentiation mainly in orders and ornaments. Normalised only after restoration in 1815.

Merchant flag introduced in 1781 and replaced with a tricolor in 1859. On the insignia reserved for large-tonnage merchant ships, it was limited to a coat of arms in the crown with the cross of Saint Stephen. The small boats used the version without the coat of arms, or with only the central shields in the canton.

==== Fifth flag ====
Grand Duchy of Tuscany (1848–1849)

Flag of general use, introduced on 17 April 1848 with the constitutional amendment issued a few weeks earlier by Leopold II. On 27 January 1849, the constitution was abrogated and the previous Austrian-colored flag was restored. It was an Italian tricolour with yet another version of the coat of arms in the middle lane.

=== Kingdom of Etruria ===
1803–1807

1803–1807

Merchant flag 1803–1807

Merchant flag (used by little tonnage ships)

The state and military flag of the Napoleonic kingdom, probably adopted in 1803 (certified on 1 January 1804) and survived until its incorporation into France on 10 December 1807. In the centre of the flag was the complete royal coat of arms: the coats of arms of the Farnese and Gonzaga lineages with two pieces of Lorraine and Austria on the basis, in the center the arms of Castile and Leon with the escutcheon representing France and the Medici. However, flags with very simplified versions of the coat of arms were also used, with only the shield of France and the Medici attached to the cross of St. Stephen, with or without a crown.

During the same period, the merchant flag was used with only two blue stripes and a coat of arms, usually in a simplified version as on the state flag, and at least without orders. The flag used on small-tonnage ships did not include the coat of arms at all.

=== State of the Presidi ===
1557–1700

The State of the Presidi was a small territory between 1557 and 1801. It consisted of five towns on the Tuscan coast—Porto Ercole and Porto Santo Stefano on the promontory of Monte Argentario, as well as Orbetello, Talamone and Ansedonia—and their hinterland, along with the islet of Giannutri and the fortress of Porto Longone on the island of Elba. The Presidi encompassed about 300 km^{2}. They were effectively attached to the Kingdom of Naples and changed hands several times with it, resulting in three distinct historical periods. From 1557 to 1707, they were a possession of the Crown of Spain administered by the Spanish Habsburg viceroy of Naples; from 1708 to 1733, a possession of the Austrian Habsburgs administered by their viceroy in Naples; and from 1733 to 1801, a dependency of the Spanish Bourbon kings of Naples. By the Treaty of Florence of 28 March 1801, the king of Naples ceded the Presidi to the French Republic, which then ceded them to the new Kingdom of Etruria. After the downfall of France in 1814 and the Congress of Vienna in 1815, the territories were granted to the restored Grand Duchy of Tuscany. The dependence of the state on Spain is in the period when the Habsburg Spanish kings used the cross of Burgundy.

=== Duchy of Massa and Carrara ===
1790–1796 and 1814–1829

The state of Massa and Carrara was established in 1473, freeing itself from the protection of Florence, and was ruled by the Marquesas Malaspina, then Cybo-Malaspina (1519), dukes from 1605. In the French period (1796-1814), the principality was attached to various Napoleonic states (Cispadana, Cisalpina, the Kingdom of Italy and Etruria, and the Duchy of Lucca), and then to France. Restored in 1814, it survived until it was incorporated into the Duchy of Modena in 1829. White flags with the family coat of arms. The naval flag that came into force in 1790 with the accession of Maria Beatrice Cybo-Malaspina Este to the throne and survived, excluding the Napoleonic period, until her death on 14 November 1829, which coincided with the end of the duchy.

=== Lordship and Principality of Piombino ===
The fief of Piombino and its territory, which for more than two centuries also included the island of Elba, was from 1594 a principality of the empire. In 1801, it was occupied by the French who united it with Lucca in the years 1805-1809. The Congress of Vienna did not restore a principality that became part of the Grand Duchy of Tuscany.

==== First flag ====
?–1628

The enigmatic banner of the House of Appiani used from the middle ages until the loss of the principality of the extinction of the dynasty with the death of Isabella Appiani.

==== Second flag ====
Principality of Piombino (1701–1803)

The princely and state flag, adopted in 1701 when the two branches of the ruling family merged and survived until the French occupation in 1801. The arms of the Boncompagni-Ludovisi family; the shield shows the coats of arms of two branches of the family alternately: three shortened golden rings on the red background of the Ludovisi family and a golden half-dragon on the red background of the Boncompagni family. There are insignia of the Holy Roman Church on the pale. Crown of the Prince of the Empire and chain of the Order of the Golden Fleece.

=== Republic and Duchy of Lucca ===
==== First flag ====
12th century–1799

Merchant flag (13th century–1799)

State flag before 1799. It was and still is the flag of the city of Lucca in use since the 12th century (perhaps even from the last half of the 11th century). It was practically a national flag. It was abolished with the French occupation in 1799 and the Austrian counter-occupation. When the French returned for longer in 1801, it was adopted as the national flag and remained so until 1805, when the republic became a principality. Color interpretation is uncertain. The red probably comes from the ghibelline faction that Lucca joined in the first half of the 11th century.

The merchant flag was a civilian flag for land and sea, which, according to medieval urban custom, differed from the flag of the commune. Also described (1370) are flags with two insignia joined into a single fabric. The flag and the motto "Libertas" definitely disappeared in 1799 after the French occupation.

==== Second flag ====
1799

In 1799 French Jacobins created a centralized republic, the State of Lucca, with a democratic constitution. The constitution granted the government to an Executive Directory, with a bicameral legislature composed of the Council of Juniors and the Council of Seniors. The democracy did not last long. When entering the Jacobin army, the government used a flag with an additional green stripe, imitating the Italian tricolor. It is possible that this flag never really existed, but if it is a historic design, it was used for 5 months.

==== Third flag ====
1801–1805

Merchant flag (1801–1805)

The nautical flag announced on 20 June 1803 (the white and red bicolour remained on land) and replaced in the summer of 1805 after the republic was transformed into a principality. The colours were both French and the combined colours of the two historic banners of the former aristocratic republic.

==== Fourth flag ====
1815–1818

Temporary flag, yellow and red are the colors of the Spanish Bourbons. Lucca became a duchy under the rule of the daughter of the Spanish king.

==== Fifth flag ====
Duchy of Lucca (1818–1824)

Merchant Flag (1818–1824)

? Merchant Flag (1819–1820)

Merchant Flag (1820–1847)

The royal and state flag introduced on 7 November 1818 by Regent Maria Luisa de Borbon-Parma, to whom Lucca was assigned after a series of provisional governments and replaced in 1824 after her death (13 March). In the center, the coat of arms of Maria Luisa with a quarter-oval shield: in 1 the coat of arms of the Medici and Farnese, in 2 Spain (Castile and León), in 3 Gonzaga, in 4 Austria and Lorraine. Usually a wheel with the colors and panther of Lucca, and generally another wheel of Bourbon. A crown above everything.

The flag without a coat of arms is a merchant's flag introduced by Maria Luisa on 7 November 1818 and probably survived until her death in 1824, although a new design was introduced in 1820. A flag with a cross very similar to the former Tuscan maritime flag is uncertain in Lucca.

Merchant flag certified on 1 June 1820. In theory, it was lowered on 4 October 1847, when the principality passed to Tuscany, it was in fact used in the ports of Lucca until the unification of Italy. It was a variant of the then Spanish merchant insignia, from which it differed in stripes of equal width.

==== Sixth flag ====
Duchy of Lucca (1824–1847)

The ducal and state flag introduced in 1824 by Duke Charles and lasted until the principality's anection to Tuscany on 4 October 1847. Charles changed the coat of arms on the flag, replacing the mother's coat of arms with his own. The coat of arms with the Spanish lace was quartered with the arms of Lucca (I and IV) and Spain (II and III), Bourbon oval in center.

=== Principality of Lucca and Piombino ===
1805–1814

Flag of general use adopted on 8 August 1805, with the establishment of the Principality of Lucca and Piombino for Elisa, sister of Napoleon. The previous colors were kept with the blue being lighter. The change was probably to make the Lucca symbol more in line with the French tricolor. It was abolished in 1809. On 3 March of the same year, the principality was actually united with Tuscany, already incorporated into the empire, which returned, only formally, to being a grand duchy with Eliza becoming sovereign.

=== Principality of Elba ===
1814–1815

Naval flag

The national and state flag raised by Napoleon on the island when he landed on 4 May 1814, and lowered on 1 March 1815, when the emperor touched French soil at Cap d'Antibes in his last attempt to regain the French throne. Today, the local flag of Elba remains unchanged. The golden bees, a symbol wrongly considered to be the symbol of the Merovingian kings, were chosen by Napoleon under the false belief that French lilies were formed from them through graphic deformation.

=== Tuscan Provisional Government ===
1859–1860

The United Provinces of Central Italy existed in the former Grand Duchy of Tuscany during the period between the abdication of Leopold II and the annexation of the country by Kingdom of Sardinia. Flag for merchant ships and consulates, decreed on 29 September 1859 and abolished in March 1860 with the end of its existence. Provisional Government adopted the tricolor with the coat of arms of the House of Savoy and a small silver lion in the canton.

=== Tuscan National Liberation Committee ===
1943–1945

The Tuscan Committee of National Liberation was an underground Italian resistance organisation during World War II based in Tuscany An offshoot of the National Liberation Committee (CLN), it was charged with organising resistance and partisan activities throughout Tuscany. Throughout the duration of its life, the CTLN adopted the symbol of a Pegasus emblazoned on top of the flag of Italy. The Pegasus had long been associated with Tuscany, and with the Pegasus' connotations of peace and the triumph of good over evil, made it an obvious symbol for adoption by the CTLN.

== Colours ==
The usage of the colours red and white to represent the Tuscan region can be dated back to at least the year 969 and the reign of Hugh, Margrave of Tuscany. He adopted a palleted shield of alternating red and white vertical stripes as his coat of arms.

Prominent Tuscan family, the Guidi's, also adopted a coat of arms coloured in red and white between the 10th and 15th centuries. The Guidi coat of arms depicted a red and silver rampant lion decussated on a red and silver field.

The colours also share a similarity to those of the flag of Austria which widely came to be used as a basis for Tuscan flags whilst Tuscany was ruled by the Austrian House of Habsburg-Lorraine between 1737 and 1848.

Red and white may also have derived from the traditional usage of the colours in the symbolism of Tuscan towns. For example, the flags and coats of arms of Florence, Pisa, Lucca, Pistoia, Elba, and Grosseto all heavily feature the colours red and white.

== Bibliography ==
- Angiolini, Franco (2006). "I presidios di Toscana: cadena de oro e llave y freno de Italia". In García Hernán, Enrique; Maffi, Davide (eds.). Guerra y sociedad en la monarquía hispánica: política, estrategia y cultura en la Europa moderna (1500–1700). Vol. 1. pp. 171–88.
- Menning, Ralph (1995). "Stato dei Presidi". In Frey, Linda; Frey, Marsha (eds.). The Treaties of the War of the Spanish Succession: An Historical and Critical Dictionary. Greenwood Publishing Group. pp. 421–22. ISBN 978-0-313-27884-6.
- Najemy, John M. (2006). A history of Florence 1200-1575. Wiley. ISBN 978-1-4051-1954-2.
