= Pegasus =

Winged horse in Greek mythology

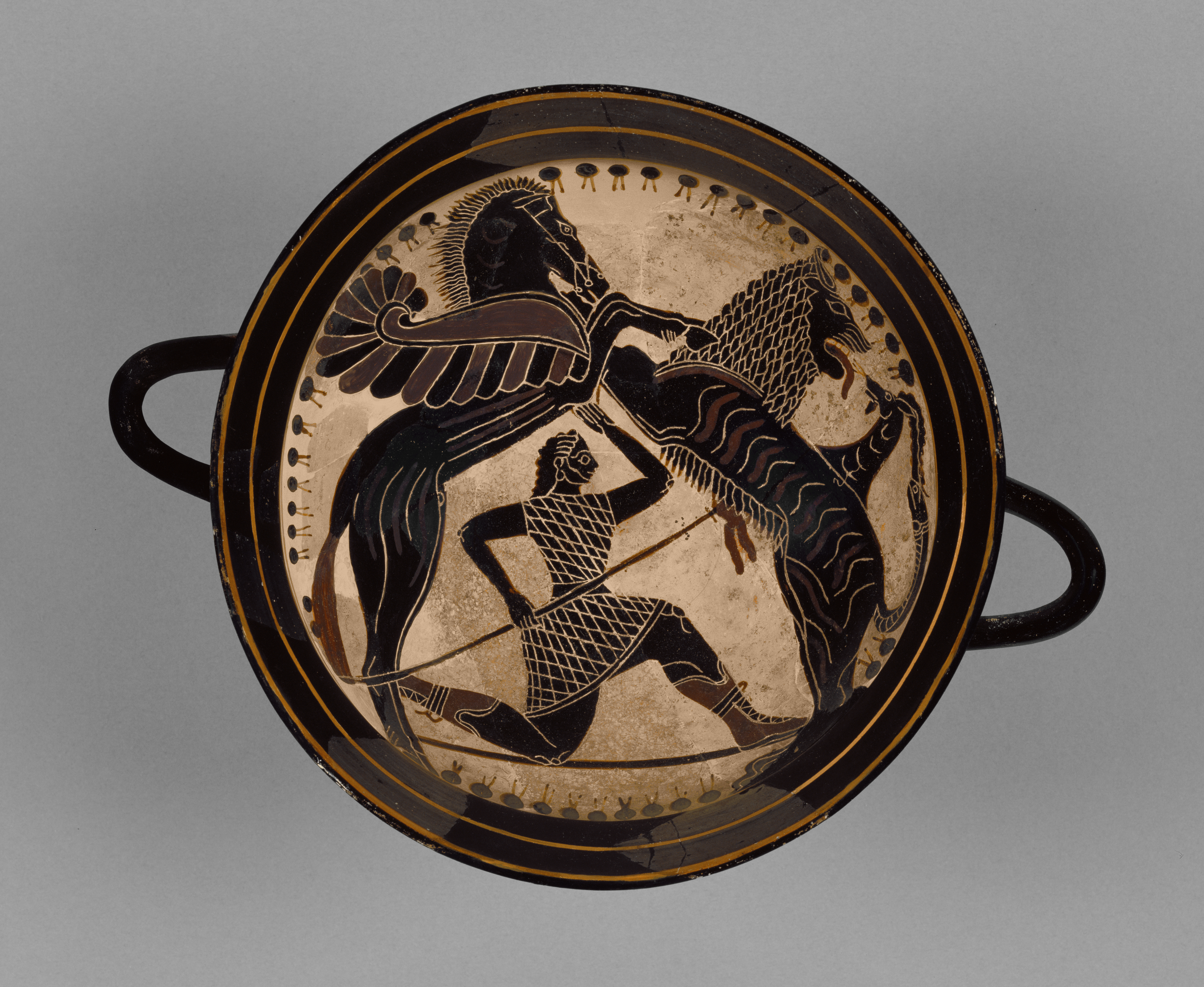
Pegasus attacking the Chimera with his hooves, above the hero Bellerophon, on a Laconian black-figure kylix, attributed to the Boreads Painter and dating to c. 575–550 BC

Pegasus (Ancient Greek: Πήγασος, romanized: Pḗgasos; Latin: Pegasus, Pegasos) is a winged horse in Greek mythology, usually depicted as a white stallion. He was sired by Poseidon, in his role as horse-god, and foaled by Medusa, one of three Gorgon sisters. Pegasus was the brother of Chrysaor, both born from Medusa's blood when their mother was decapitated by Perseus. Greco-Roman poets wrote about his ascent to heaven after his birth and his obeisance to Zeus, who instructed him to bring lightning and thunder from Olympus.

Pegasus is the creator of Hippocrene, the fountain on Mount Helicon. He was captured by the Greek hero Bellerophon, near the fountain Peirene, with the help of Athena and Poseidon. Pegasus allowed Bellerophon to ride him in order to defeat the monster Chimera, which led to many more exploits. Bellerophon later fell from Pegasus's back while trying to reach Mount Olympus. Both Pegasus and Bellerophon were said to have died at the hands of Zeus for trying to reach Olympus. Other tales have Zeus bring Pegasus to Olympus to carry his thunderbolts.

Also known as a constellation, Pegasus is a subject of much iconography, especially through ancient Greek pottery as well as paintings and sculptures of the Renaissance.

== Etymology ==
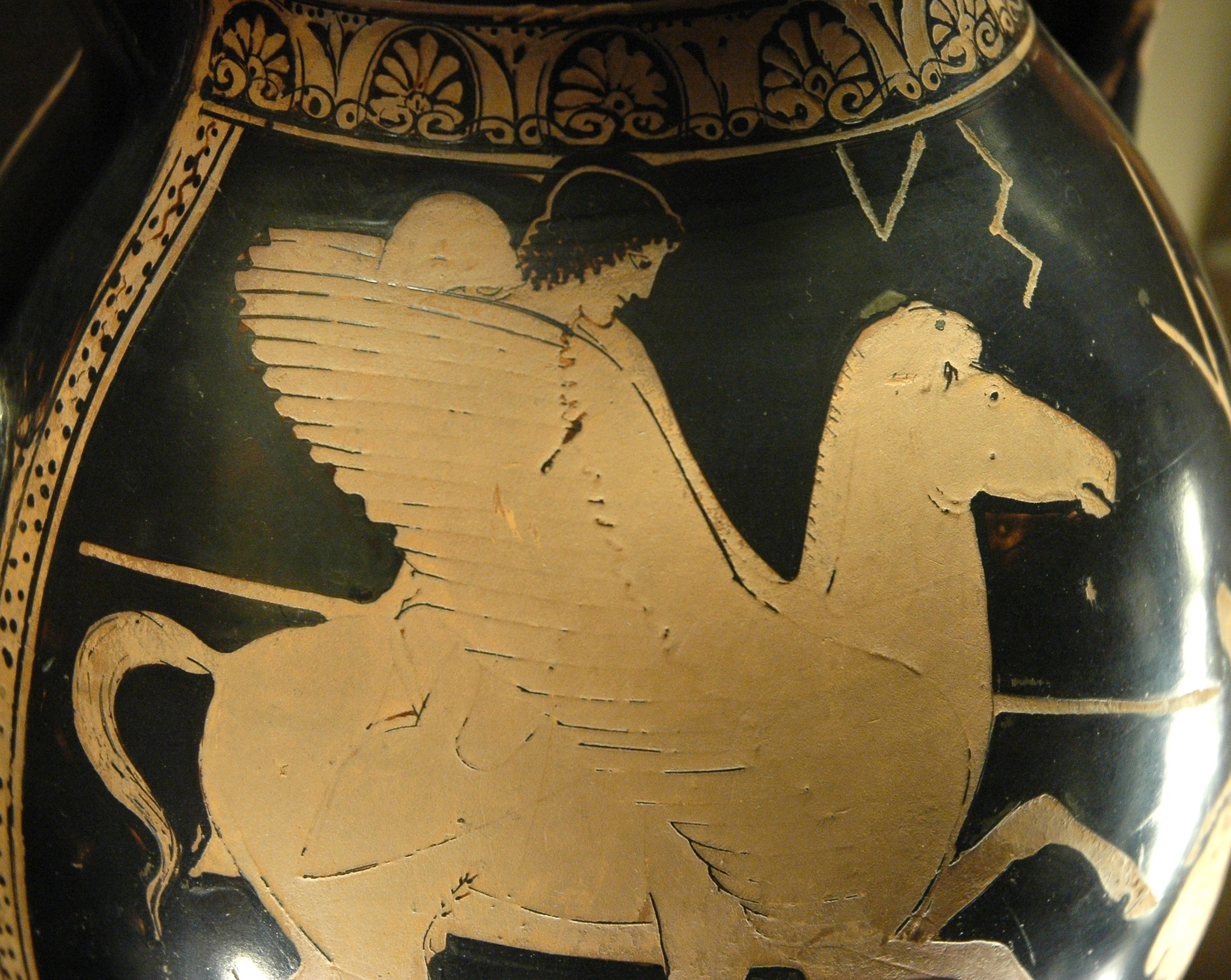
Bellerophon mounted on Pegasus fighting the Chimera, side A from an Attic red-figure pelike

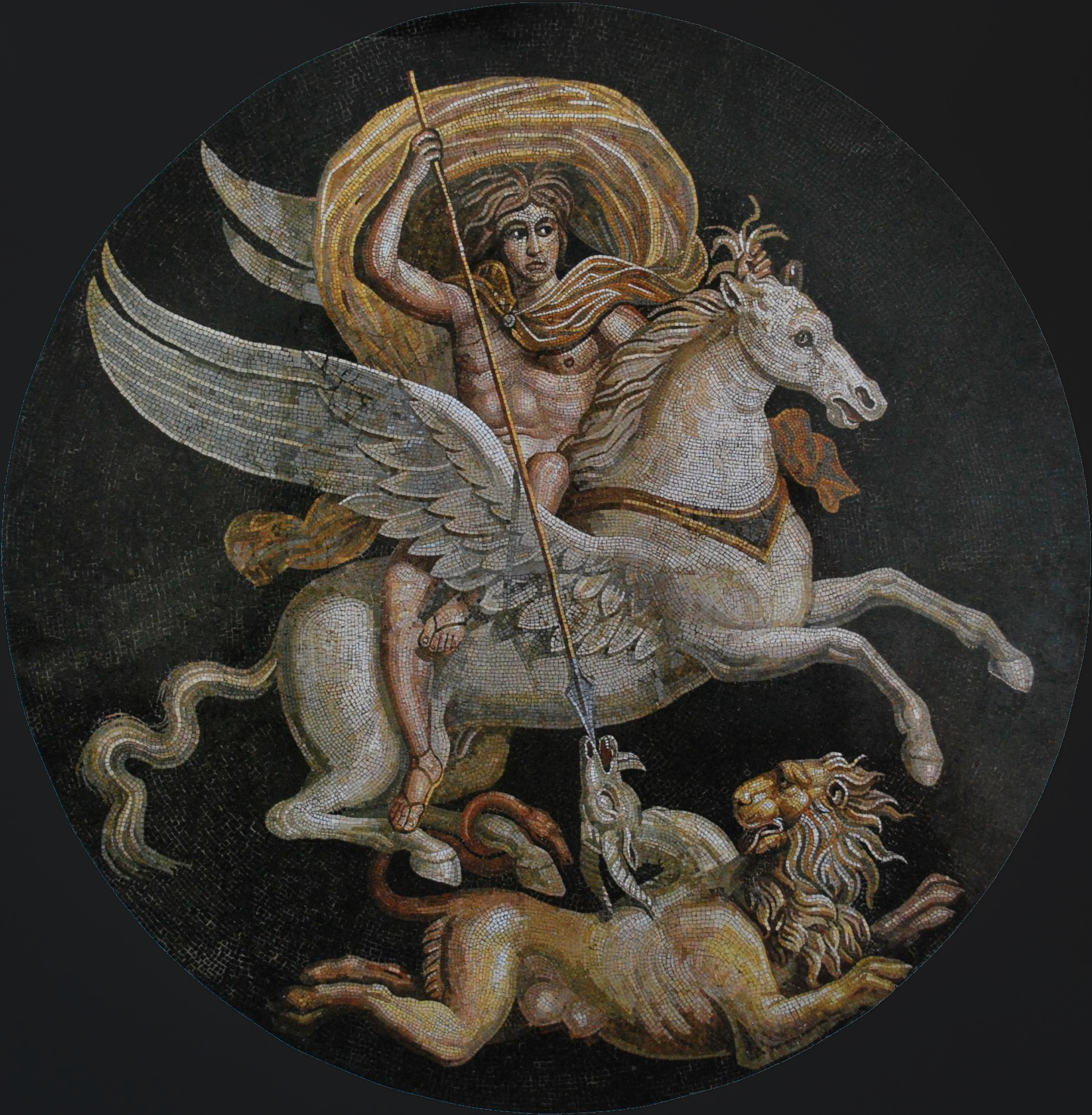
Bellerophon riding Pegasus and slaying the Chimera, central medallion of a Gallo-Roman mosaic from Autun, Musée Rolin, 2nd to 3rd century AD

The poet Hesiod presents a folk etymology of the name Pegasus as derived from πηγή pēgē 'spring, well', referring to "the pegai of Okeanos, where he was born".

A proposed etymology of the name is Luwian pihassas 'lightning', and Pihassassi, a local Luwian-Hittite name in southern Cilicia of a weather deity associated with thunder and lightning. The proponents of this etymology adduce the role of Pegasus, reported as early as Hesiod, as the bringer of thunderbolts to Zeus. That interpretation was first suggested in 1952 and remains widely accepted, but Robin Lane Fox (2009) has criticized it as implausible.

== Springs ==
According to early myths, everywhere the winged horse struck his hoof to the earth, an inspiring water spring burst forth. One of these springs was upon the Muses' Mount Helicon, the Hippocrene ("horse spring"). Antoninus Liberalis suggested, that it was opened at the behest of Poseidon to prevent the mountain from swelling with rapture at the song of the Muses. Another spring associated with Pegasus was at Troezen. Hesiod relates how Pegasus was peacefully drinking from a spring when the hero Bellerophon captured him. Based on this connection, the Muses were also referred to as Pegasides.

== Thunderbolts ==
Hesiod wrote that Pegasus carried thunderbolts for Zeus.

=== Roman iconography ===
McCartney examines early Roman aes signatum (cast bronze currency) that pairs Pegasus with an eagle carrying a thunderbolt. He interprets this imagery in light of literary traditions that describe Pegasus as bearing Zeus’s thunder or drawing the god’s storm chariot, suggesting that Roman iconography viewed Pegasus as linked to divine power and storm symbolism.

== Birth ==
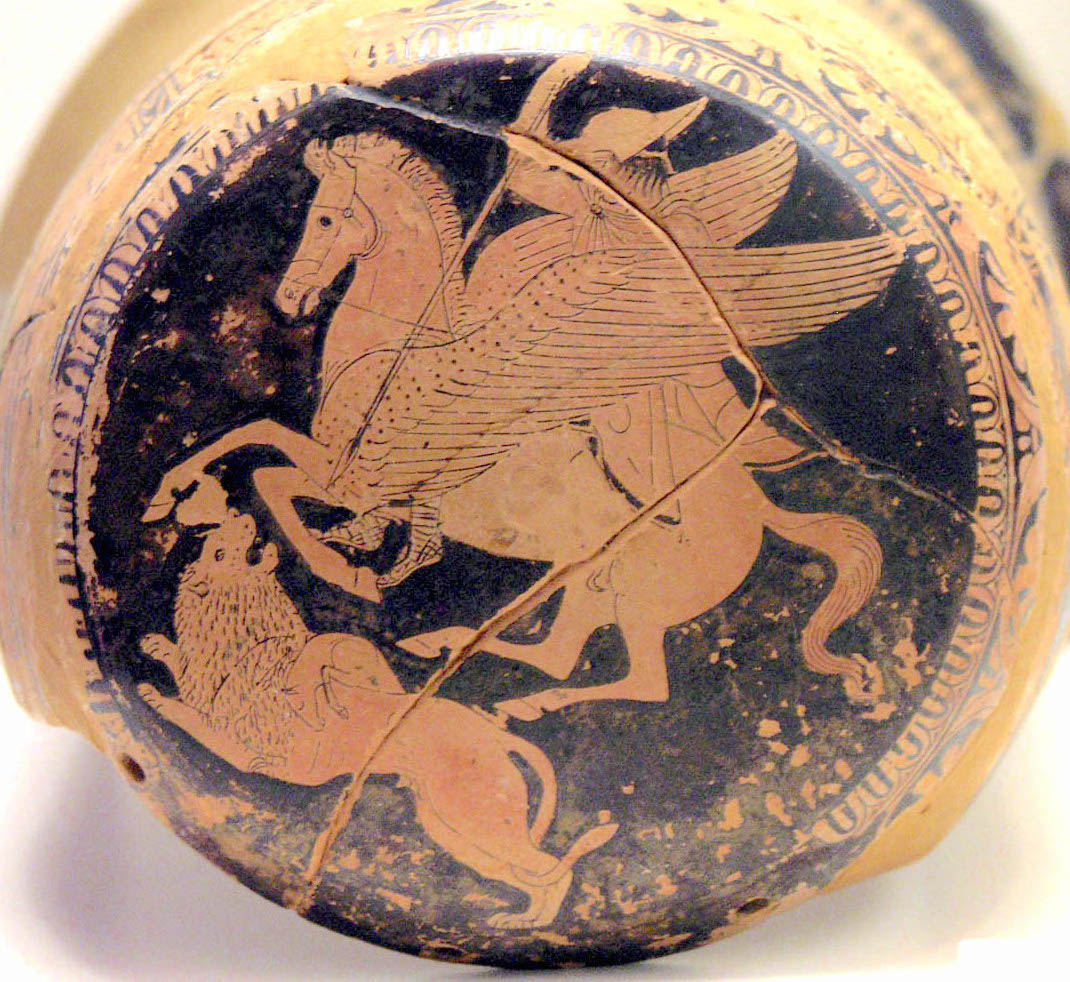
Bellerophon and the Chimera, edge of an Attic red-figure epinetron (thigh-protector used by a woman when weaving)

There are several versions of the birth of the winged stallion and his brother Chrysaor in the far distant place at the edge of Earth, Hesiod's "springs of Oceanus", which encircles the inhabited earth, where Perseus found Medusa:

One is that they sprang from the blood issuing from Medusa's neck as Perseus was beheading her, similar to the manner in which Athena was born from the head of Zeus after he swallowed her pregnant mother.

In another version, when Perseus beheaded Medusa, the brothers were born of the Earth, when the Gorgon's blood fell upon her. A variation of this story holds that they were formed from the mingling of Medusa's blood, pain, and sea foam, implying that Poseidon had involvement in their making.

The last version bears resemblance to Hesiod's account of the birth of Aphrodite from the foam created when the severed genitals of Uranus were cast into the sea by Cronus.

== Bellerophon ==
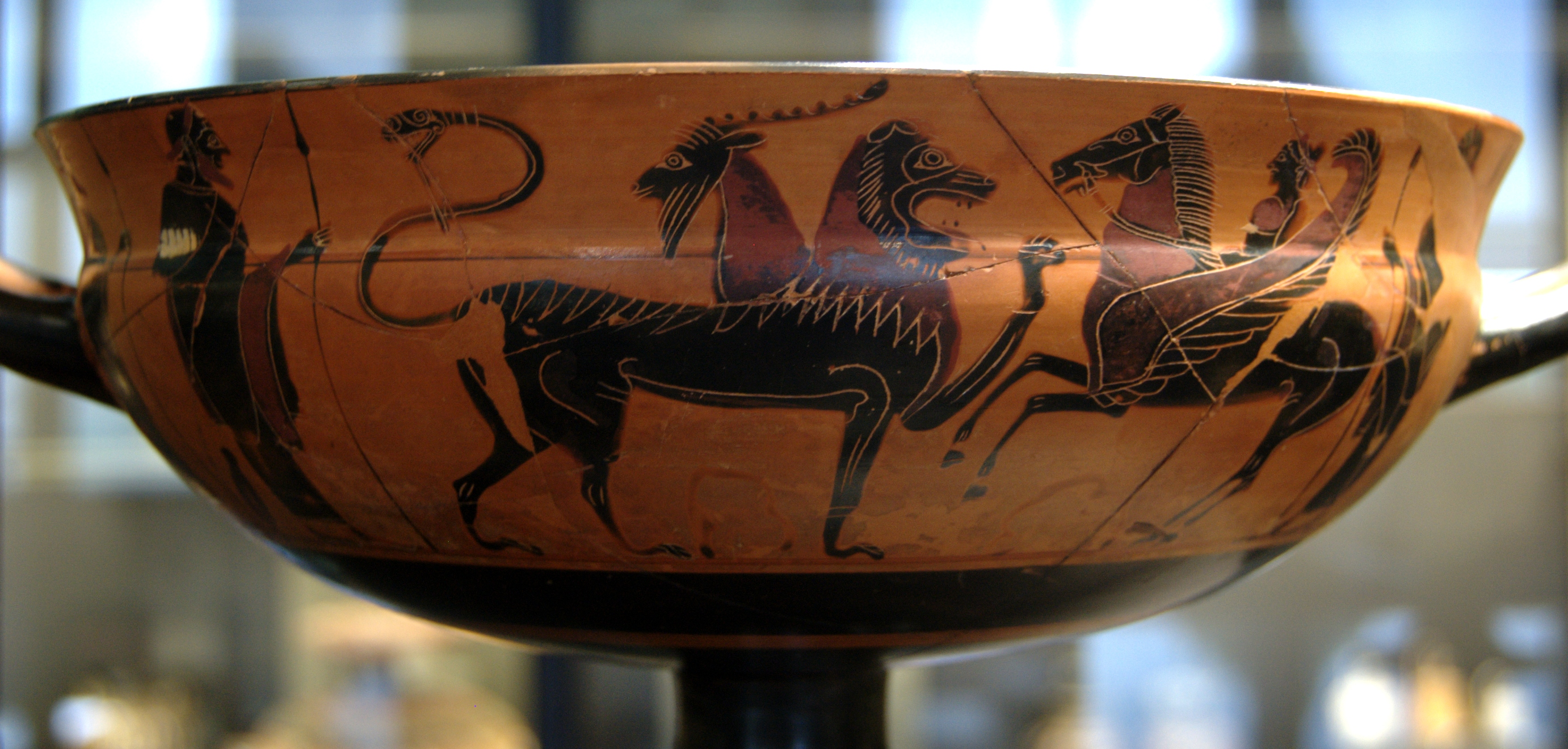
Bellerophon fighting the Chimera on an Athenian black-figure Siana cup found in Camiros (Rhodes)

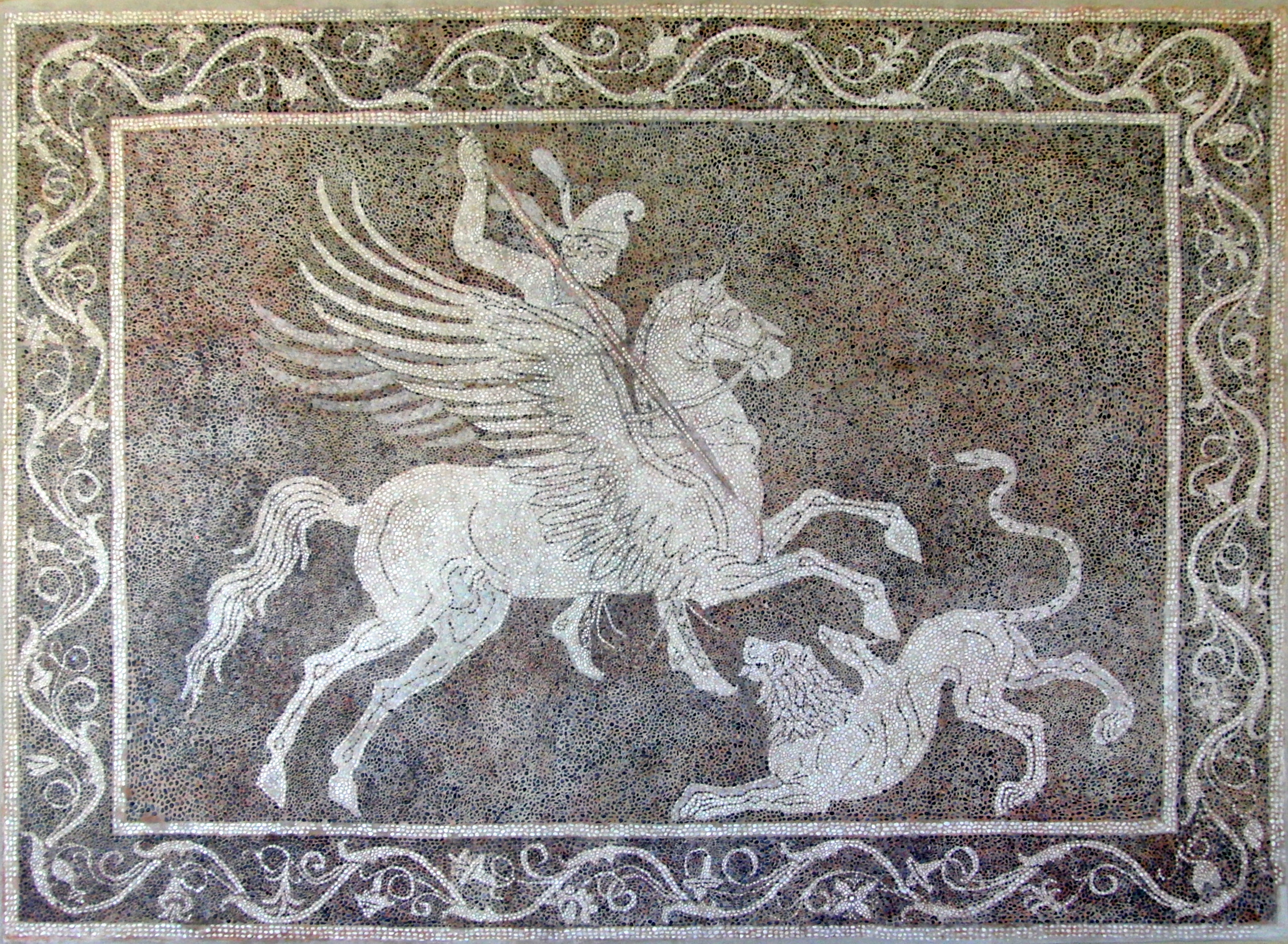
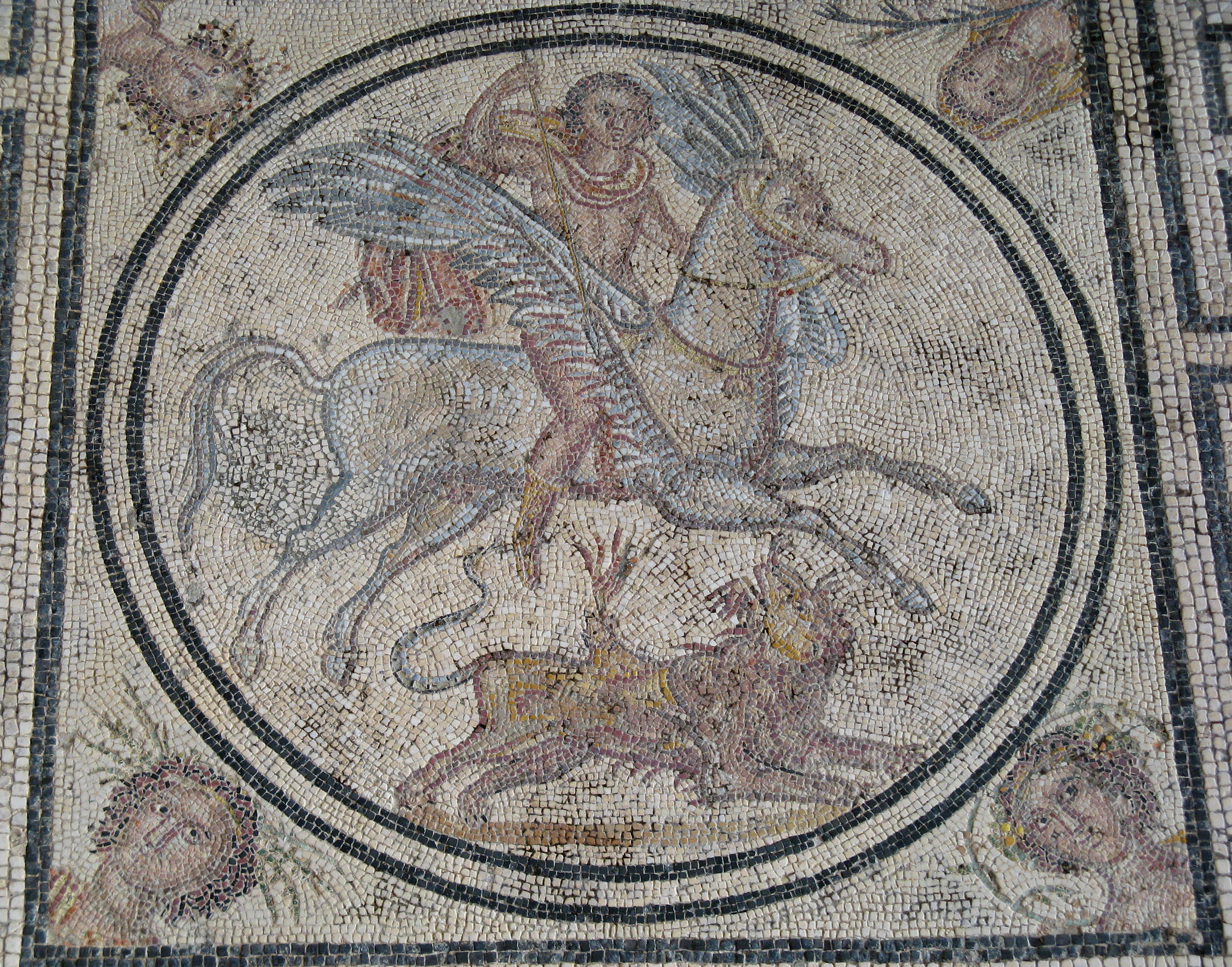
Left: a Hellenistic Greek mosaic of Bellerophon slaying the Chimera, 300–270 BC, Archaeological Museum of Rhodes
Right: a Roman mosaic of Bellerophon slaying the Chimera, 2nd to 3rd centuries AD, Musée de la Romanité, Nîmes

Pegasus aided the hero Bellerophon in his fight against the Chimera. There are varying tales about how Bellerophon found Pegasus; the most common being that the hero was told by Polyeidos to sleep in the temple of Athena, where the goddess visited him in the night and presented him with a golden bridle. The next morning, still clutching the bridle, Bellerophon found Pegasus drinking at the Pierian spring, caught him, and eventually tamed him.

=== Ancient interpretations ===
Hubbard discusses multiple ancient accounts of Pegasus’s capture, including versions in Hesiod, Pindar, and Corinthian cult tradition. He highlights Athena’s role in providing the bridle that allowed Pegasus to be tamed and connects this motif to the Corinthian cult of Athena Hippia/Chalinitis. Hubbard also notes Pegasus’s appearance on early Corinthian coinage, where the winged horse served as a civic symbol.

== Perseus ==
Michaud's Biographie universelle relates that when Pegasus was born, he flew to where thunder and lightning are released. Then, according to certain versions of the myth, Athena tamed him and gave him to Perseus, who flew to Ethiopia to help Andromeda.

== Olympus ==
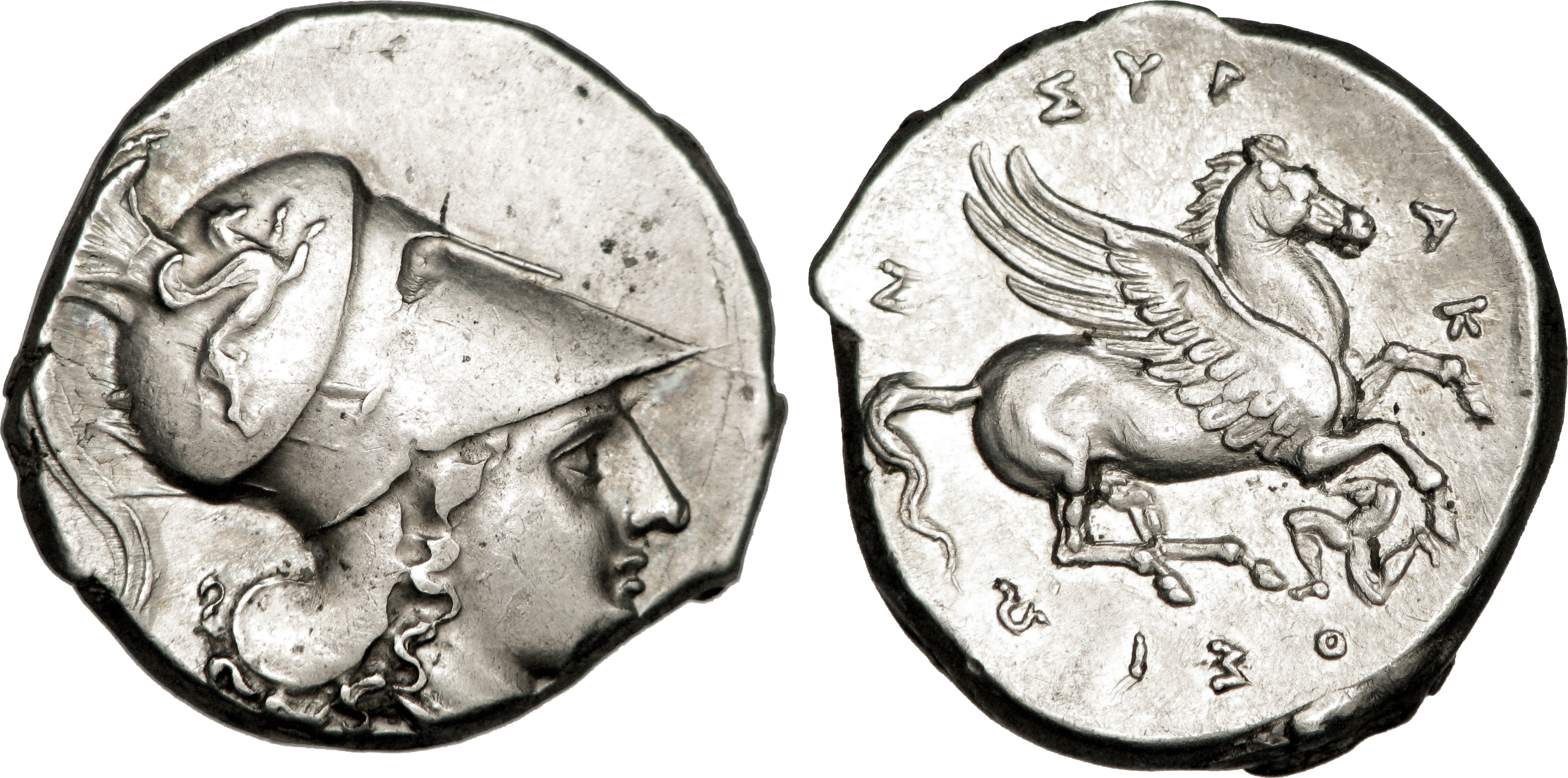
Silver coin of Syracuse: obverse, head of Athena wearing a Corinthian helmet adorned with a griffin; reverse, Pegasus flying and beneath him a triskeles

After Bellerophon fell off Pegasus while trying to reach Olympus, Pegasus and Athena left him and continued to Olympus where he was stabled with other steeds belonging to Zeus, and was given the task of carrying Zeus's thunderbolts, along with other members of his entourage, his attendants/handmaidens/shield bearers/shieldmaidens, Astrape and Bronte.

Because of his years of faithful service to Zeus, Pegasus was later honoured with transformation into a constellation. On the day of his catasterism, when Zeus transformed him into a constellation, a single feather fell to Earth near the city of Tarsus.

=== Indo-European context ===
Lobell and Powell situate Pegasus within the wider Indo-European tradition of divine or supernatural horses. They note that Pegasus’s transformation into a constellation reflects ancient associations between equine imagery and seasonal renewal, with the Pegasus constellation linked to the arrival of spring in several early traditions.

== Legacy ==
=== In heraldry ===
The pegasus became a common element in British heraldry, appearing chiefly as a supporter or a crest. Pegasi may also appear upon escutcheons, although this is rare. A pegasus rampant is featured on the arms of the Inner Temple, while those of the Richardson family contain a rare depiction of a pegasus sejant.

=== World War II emblem ===
During World War II, the silhouetted image of Bellerophon the warrior, mounted on the winged Pegasus, was adopted by the United Kingdom's newly raised parachute troops in 1941 as their upper sleeve insignia.

The emblem of the World War II, British Airborne Forces, Bellerophon riding the flying horse Pegasus

The image clearly symbolized a warrior arriving at a battle by air, the same tactics used by paratroopers. The square upper-sleeve insignia comprised Bellerophon/Pegasus in light blue on a maroon background. One source suggests that the insignia was designed by famous English novelist Daphne du Maurier, who was wife of the commander of the 1st Airborne Division (and later the expanded British Airborne Forces), General Frederick "Boy" Browning. According to the British Army Website, the insignia was designed by the celebrated East Anglian painter Major Edward Seago in May 1942. The maroon background on the insignia was later used again by the Airborne Forces when they adopted the famous maroon beret in Summer 1942. The beret was the origin of the German nickname for British airborne troops, the Red Devils. Today's Parachute Regiment carries on the maroon beret tradition. The selection process for the elite Parachute Regiment is called Pegasus Company (often abbreviated to "P Company").

In 2015 it was announced that the units of 16 Air Assault Brigade would once again use the Pegasus insignia after a 15-year hiatus.

During the airborne phase of the Normandy invasion on the night of 5–6 June 1944, British 6th Airborne Division captured all its key objectives in advance of the seaborne assault, including the capture and holding at all costs of a vital bridge over the Caen Canal, near Ouistreham. In memory of their tenacity, the bridge has been known ever since as Pegasus Bridge.

=== Tuscany ===
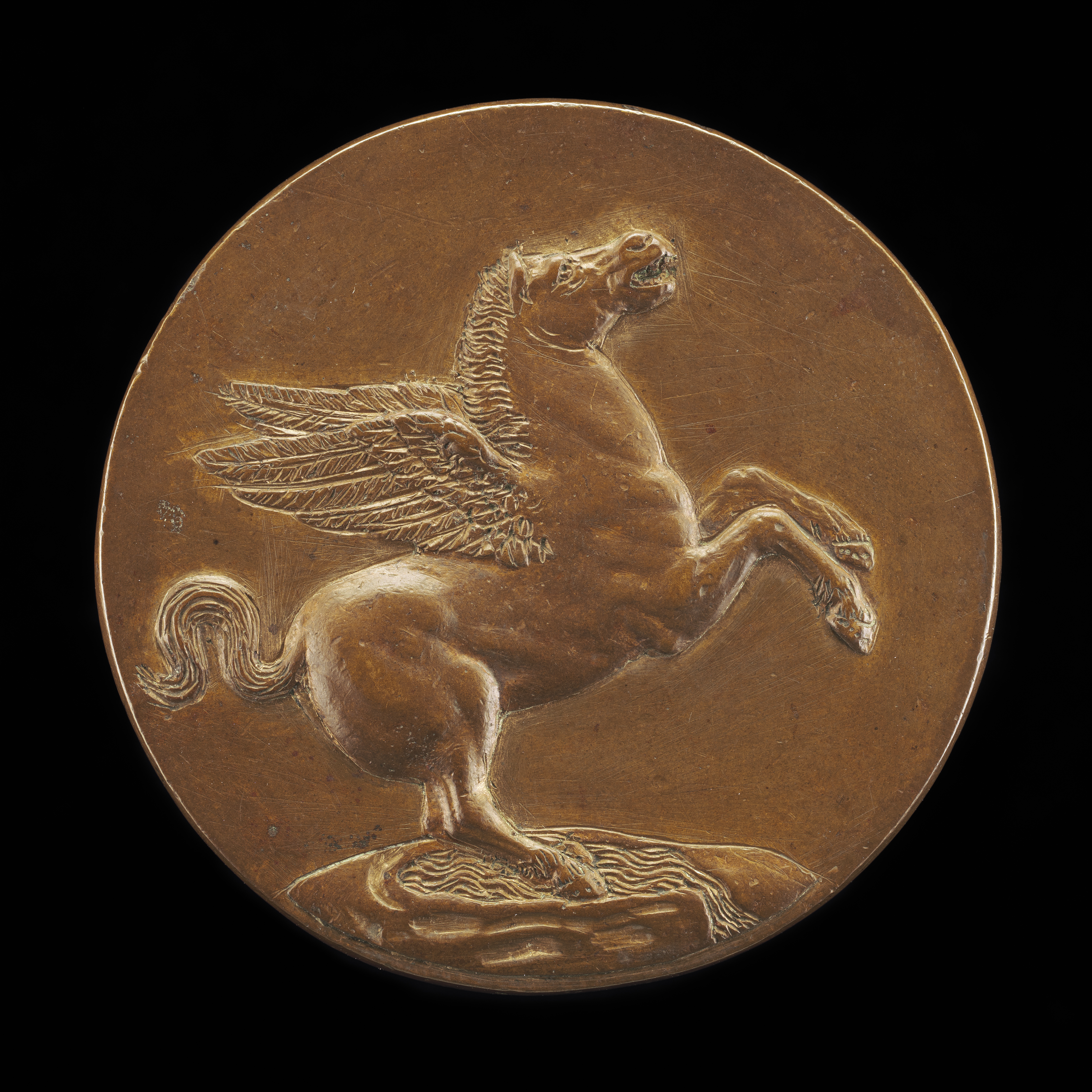
Benvenuto Cellini's 1537 coin.

The Pegasus has been a symbol of Tuscany ever since Benvenuto Cellini incorporated it in a coin made in 1537 to honor Cardinal Pietro Bembo.

The Tuscan Committee of National Liberation during the German occupation of Italy also had a Pegasus as its emblem. The winged horse is still featured on the Tuscan flag and coat of arms.

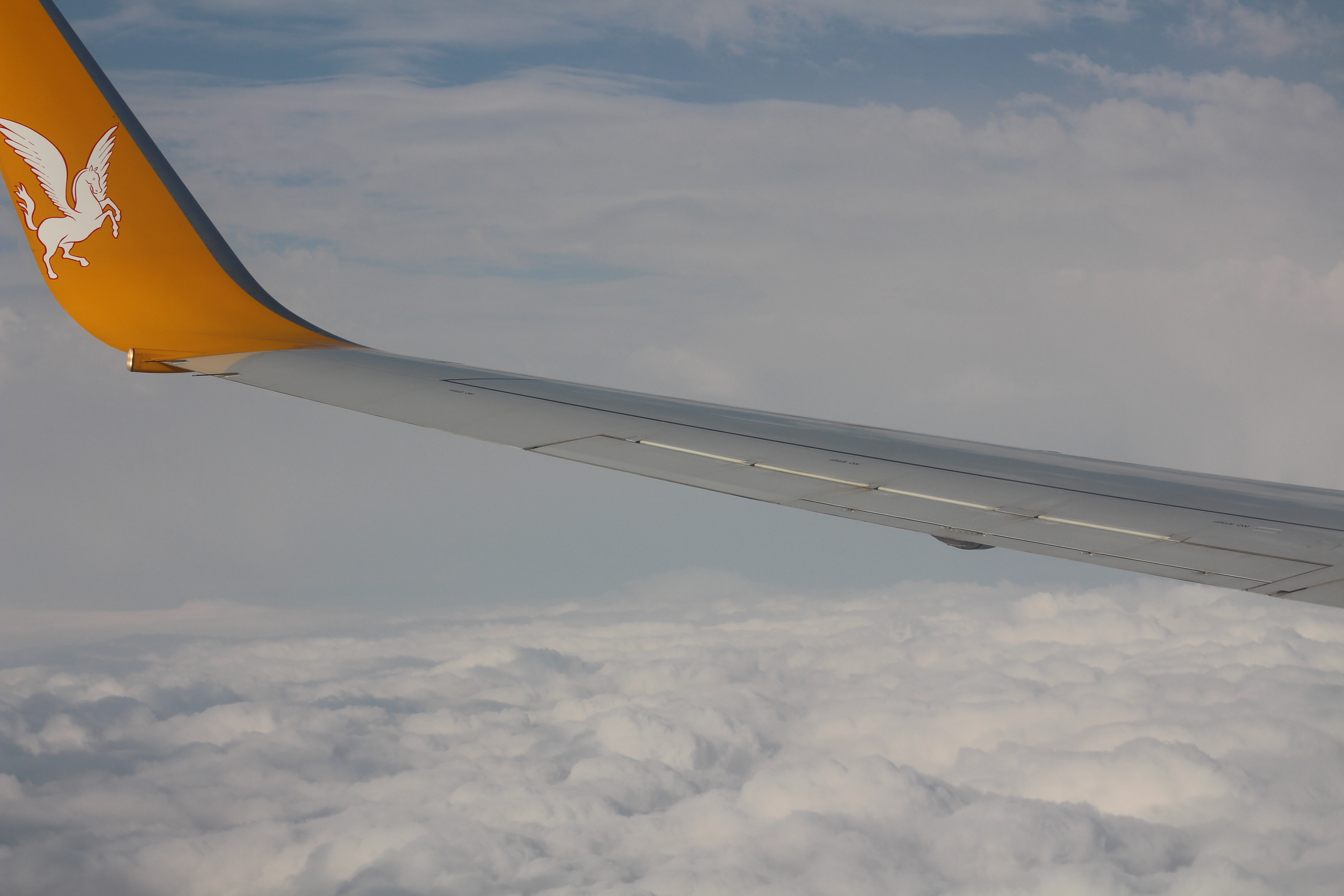
Wing of the Pegasus Airlines plane

=== In popular culture ===
The winged horse has provided an instantly recognizable corporate logo or emblem of inspiration. Ecuador launched its weather satellite, named Pegaso (pronounced [peˈɣaso], Pegasus in Spanish), on 26 April 2013 but it was damaged by Russian space debris. Pegasus Airlines (Turkish: Pegasus Hava Taşımacılığı A.Ş.) is a low-cost airline headquartered in the Kurtköy area of Pendik, Istanbul, Turkey. Mobil Oil has had a Pegasus as its company logo since its affiliation with Magnolia Petroleum Company in the 1930s. TriStar Pictures famously uses a winged horse in their logo.

== Gallery ==
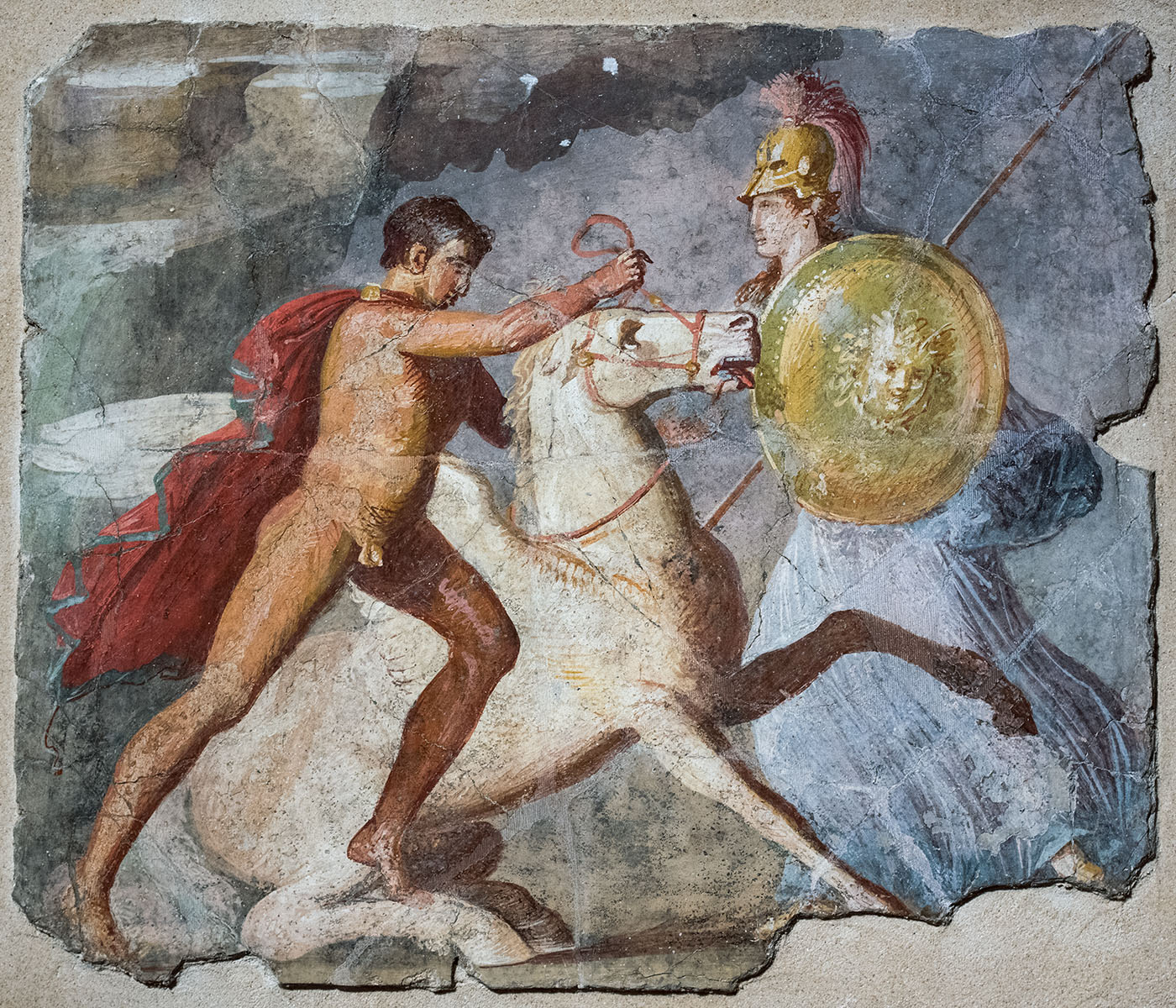
Bellerophon, Pegasus, and Athena, fresco of the 3rd style from Pompeii, first half of the 1st century

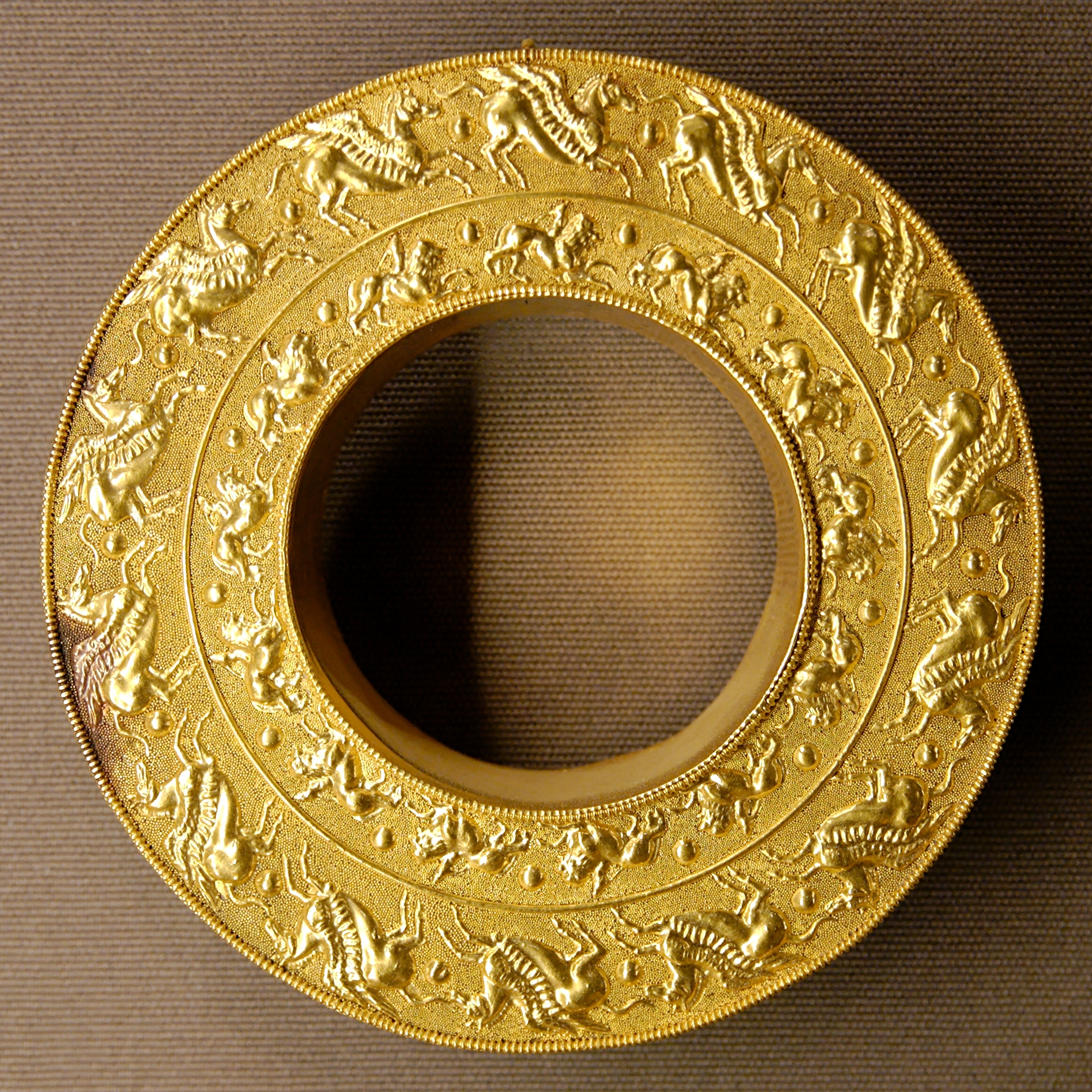
Reel (probably an ear-stud) with representations of Pegasus and Chimaira

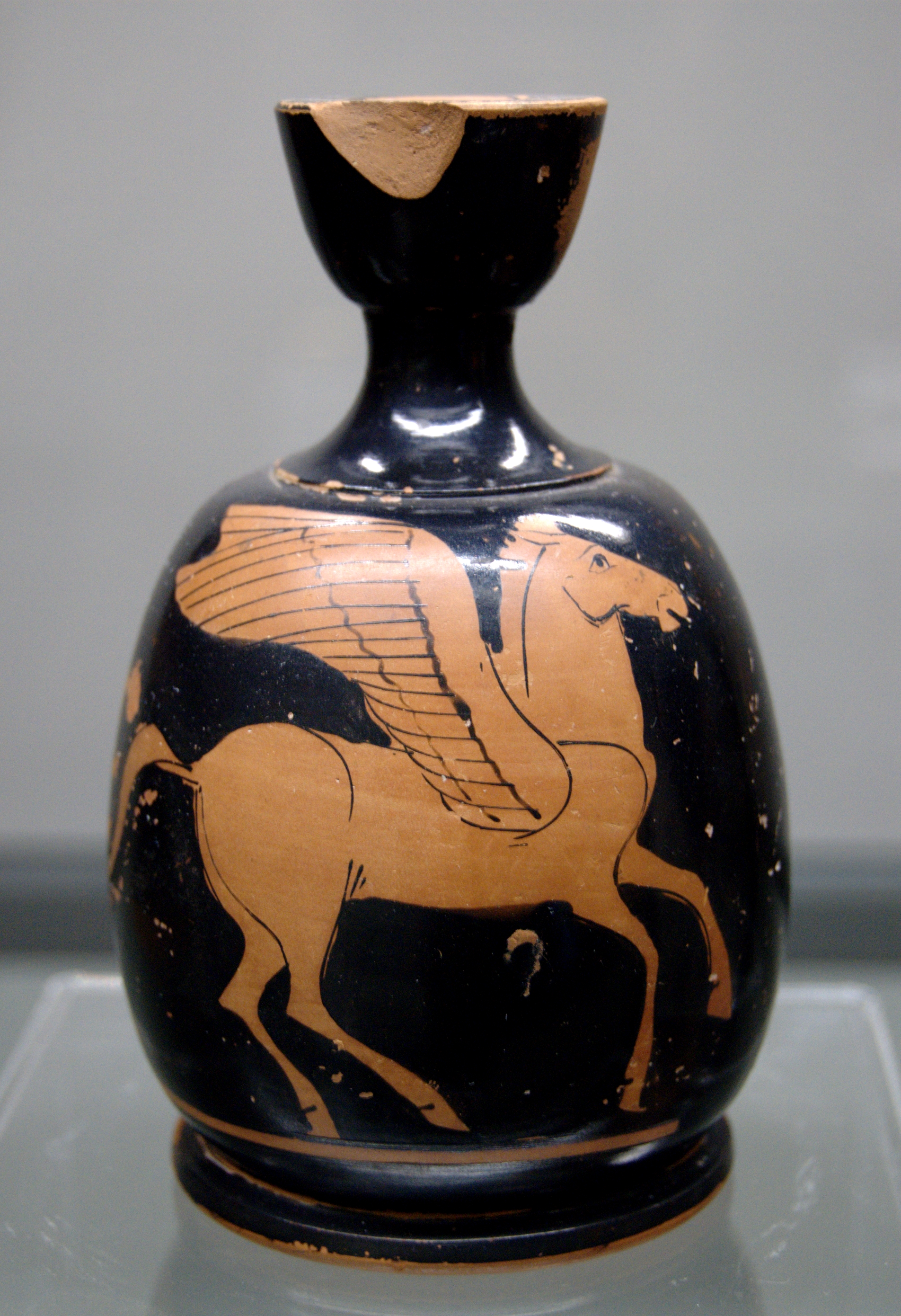
Pegasus, Attic red-figure squat lekythos, 480–460 BC, from Sicily

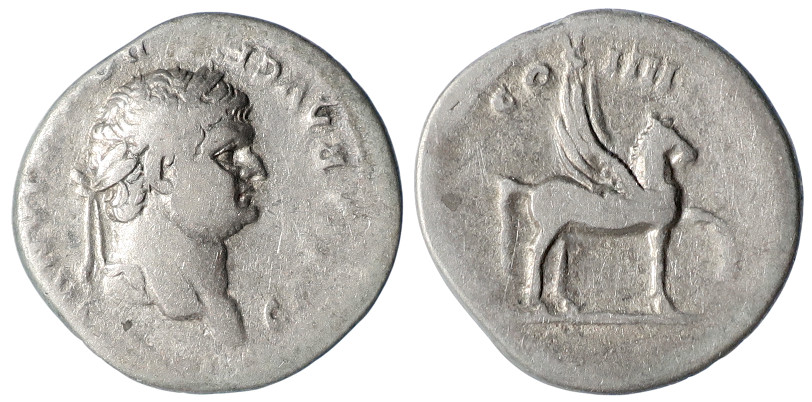
Silver denarius of Domitian with Pegasus on the reverse, dated 79–80 AD

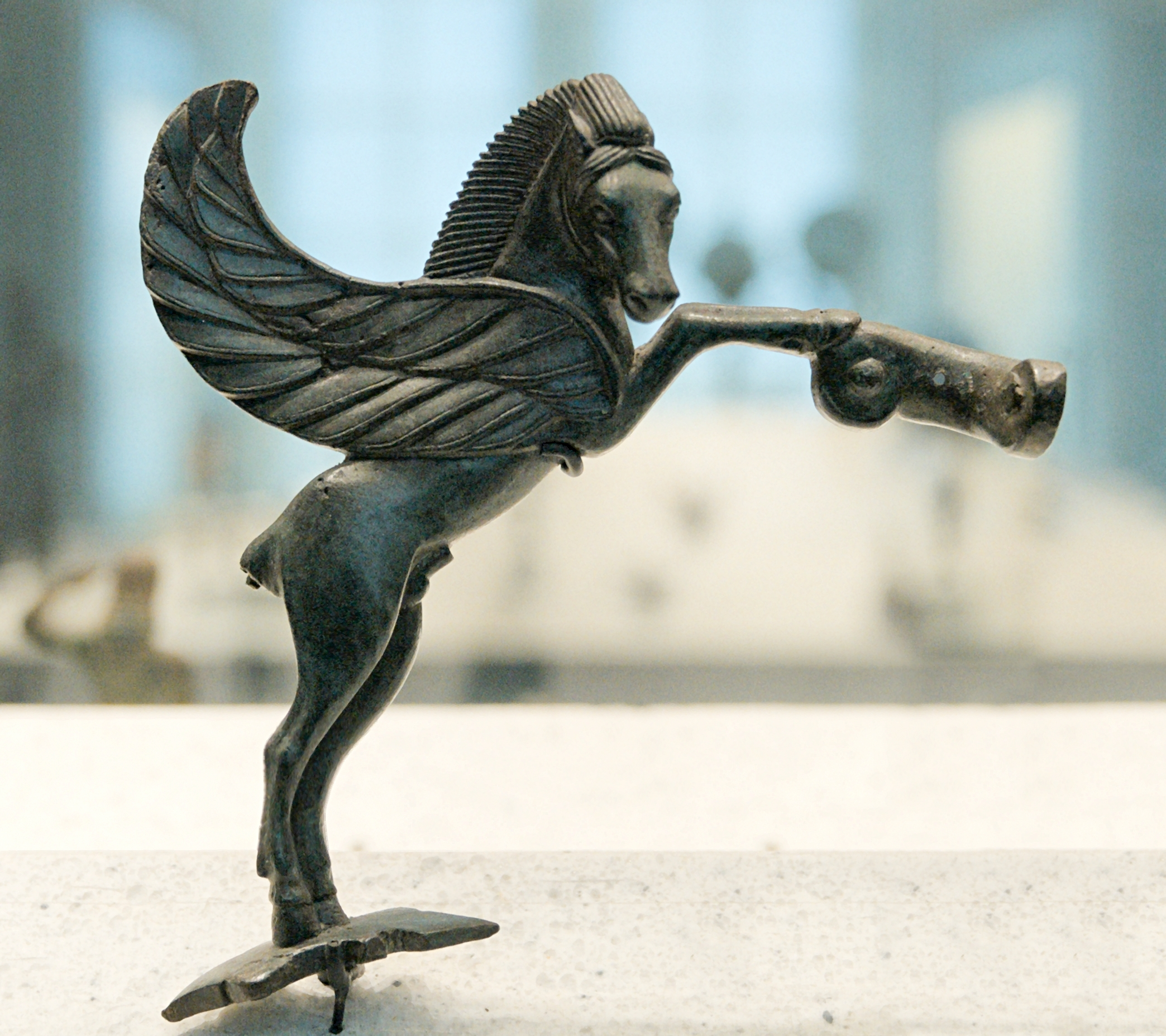
Bronze figurine of a winged horse, sixth century BC

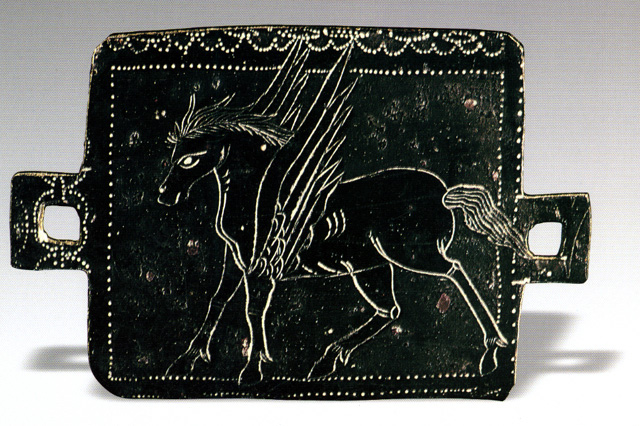
Parthian era bronze plate depicting Pegasus (Pegaz in Persian), excavated in Masjed Soleyman, Khūzestān, Iran

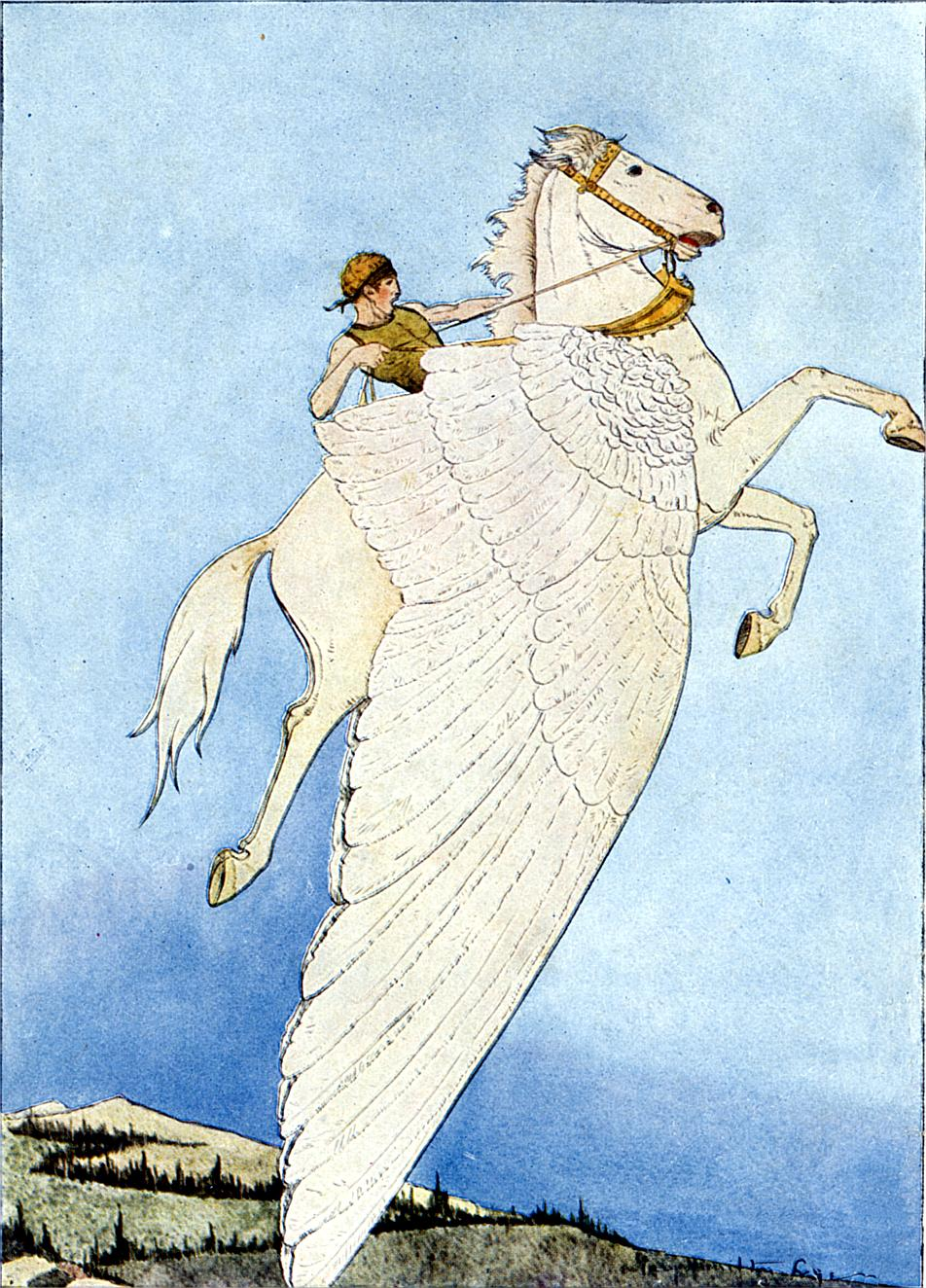
A 1914 illustration depicting Bellerophon riding Pegasus

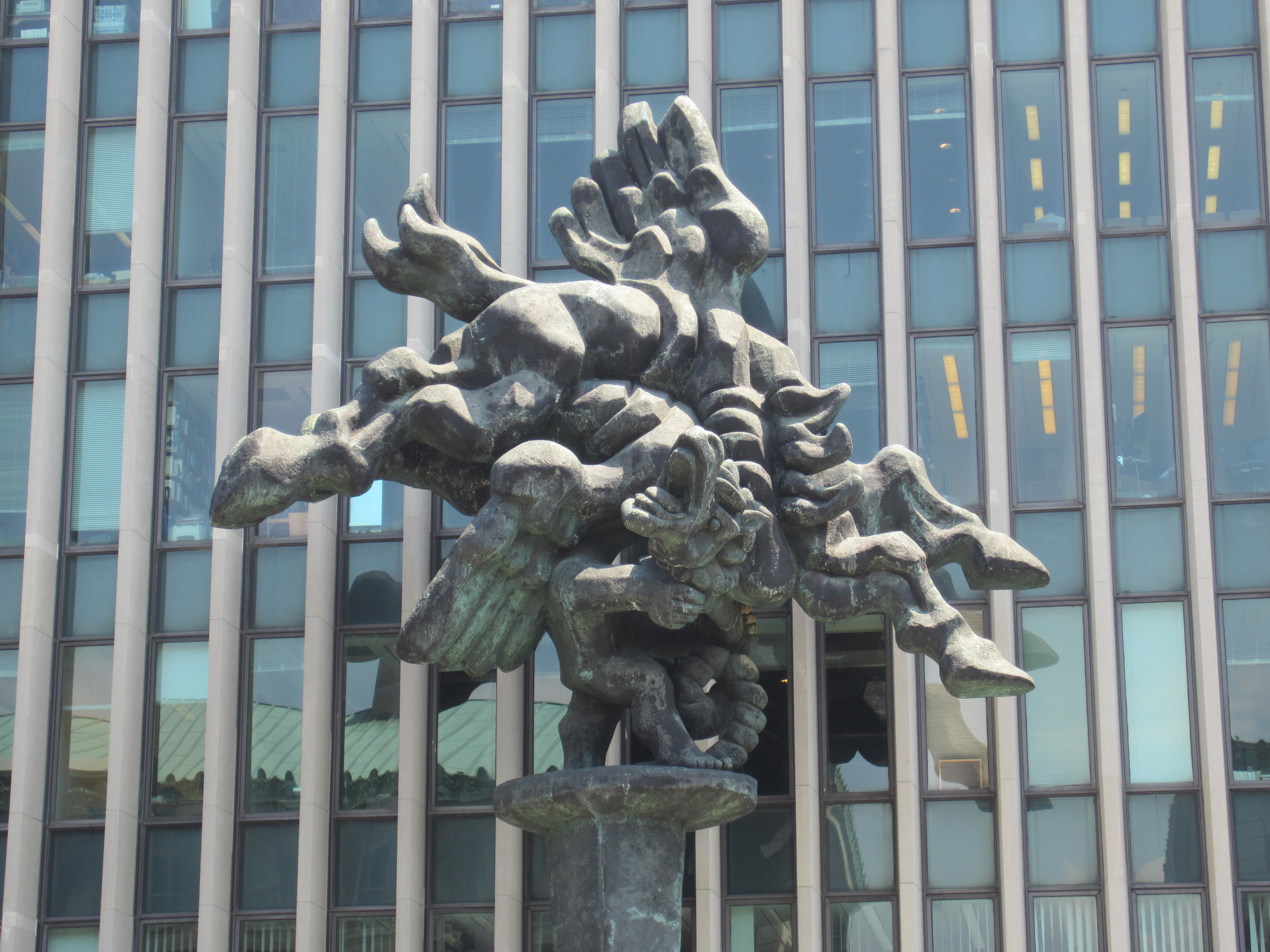
Bellerophon Taming Pegasus, by Jacques Lipchitz. 1977. Columbia University, New York

== See also ==
- Winged horse
- Uchchaihshravas
- Hippogriff
- Qianlima
- Ethiopian pegasus
- Tulpar
- Wind horse
- Hybrid creatures in mythology
