= Tuscan Committee of National Liberation =

Italian resistance organisation

Tuscan Committee of National Liberation Comitato Toscano di Liberazione Nazionale
- Leaders: Bruno Calvisi; Amleto Nepi; Nicola Zingarelli
- Founded: 9 October 1943
- Dissolved: 26 June 1946
- Headquarters: Florence
- Ideology: Anti-fascism

The Tuscan Committee of National Liberation (Italian: CTLN or Comitato Toscano di Liberazione Nazionale) was an underground Italian resistance organisation during World War II based in Tuscany, Central Italy. An offshoot of the National Liberation Committee (CLN), it was charged with organising resistance and partisan activities throughout Tuscany. It was opposed to the forces of Nazi Germany as well as Nazi Germany's puppet state local regime, the Italian Social Republic, in Tuscany following the German invasion and military occupation of Italy between September 1943 and April 1945. The CTLN became an umbrella organisation for the five main anti-fascist partisan groups operating within Tuscany.

== Beginnings ==
The CTLN formed in October 1943 following the Nazi occupation of Tuscany the previous month. Five anti-fascist groups united under the banner of the CTLN. The largest of these groups was the Italian Communist Party (PCI) followed by the Italian Socialist Party (PSI). CTLN also incorporated Partito d'Azione (PDA), the Christian Democracy (DC), and the Italian Liberal Party (PLI). The group initially met clandestinely in Florence in an artisan workshop in San Frediano and in the offices of local socialist, Natale Dall'Oppio whilst Tuscany remained under occupation.

The actions of the CTLN centered around stockpiling weapons, providing food for the local populace, and sabotaging enemy equipment and transport. CTLN activity also focused on passive resistance. This manifested itself in the form of encouraging the populace to slow down work, non-participation in Fascist activities, and distribution of anti-Fascist propaganda.

Though not without political differences, the CTLN was able to establish a dense network of committees at provincial, town, and neighborhood levels.

Since the fall of Florence in 1943 there was sporadic insurrectionist violence by the CTLN against the occupiers. However, one of the most important forms of resistance was the continued use of the clandestine Radio Cora operated by members of the PDA. Through this, the CTLN was able to feed intelligence reports to the Allied forces as well as direct supply drops into the city from Allied air forces.

== Battle of Florence ==
As the Allied forces headed towards Florence in August 1944, the CTLN began to prepare a general uprising in order to further undermine the fighting capacity of the retreating Axis armies. on 4 August 1944 a general insurrection was announced and the CTLN fought to remove the last pockets of German resistance.

At 4am on 5 August 1944 the 6th South African Armoured Division crossed the Ponte Vecchio into Florence and joined up with CTLN resistance fighters. They were closely followed by the New Zealand Māori Battalion and the British 6th Armoured Division.

On 11 August 1944, the CTLN issued a citywide proclamation stating:

"The TUSCAN COMMITTEE OF NATIONAL LIBERATION took over from today, 11 August 7 am, all the powers of provisional government that belong to him as the only representative body of the Tuscan people and by delegation of the democratic government of free Italy. CTLN forces have occupied the city since this morning and, siding in his defense, fight against the Germans, the fascists and the snipers. All citizens must contribute with all their strength to the liberation of the city, give all the moral and material help to our courageous patriots. The most serious suffering of the population is about to end with our victory.We salute the victorious allied armies and prepare to welcome them with the fraternity we feel for all the comrades in arms who fight for the same cause. Let us gain the right to be a free people by fighting and falling for freedom."

German forces utilised snipers during the Battle of Florence to target CTLN fighters in an attempt to demoralise them.

The city of Florence was finally liberated on 16 August 1944 and effective control of the city was handed over to the Allies by the CTLN. Pockets of fighting continued in the city until 1 September 1944, when the last remnants of the Fascist occupiers were driven from Florence.

CTLN forces suffered approximately 600 casualties liberating Florence, with 205 dead and over 400 injured.

== Post liberation ==
The Allied forces found Florence in the hands of an almost fully functioning government in the form of the CTLN.

Following the removal of the Fascist forces from Tuscany, the CTLN worked to provide material assistance to the population, assist in the reconstruction process, collaborate with the first town councils established by the CLN, provide help in maintaining public order, and participate in the removal of the remnants of Fascism from the local administrations.

Yet the role of the CTLN in post-occupation Tuscany was unclear. Some within the organisation began to lobby for the right of provincial committees to appoint the prefects, and of communal committees to appoint communal councils, police chiefs, and other local officials. In November 1944 a delegation of the CTLN, headed by the leader of the PDA, traveled to Rome to demand clarification of their position. The CTLN delegation met with Prime Minister Ivanoe Bonomi, who concluded that as the Italian government was back in control of most of Italy, the purpose of the CTLN and CLN had been completed and were therefore no longer required by the nation.

By early May 1945, the Allies had effective control over the whole of Italy. In exchange for 1000 lira and a merit certificate, partisans were encouraged to hand in their weapons and enter parades in which they were publicly thanked for their efforts. By June 1945, the power of the CTLN had been reduced drastically. The CTLN was dissolved on 26 June 1946 following the 1946 Italian general election.

== Symbolism ==
Throughout the duration of its life, the CTLN adopted the symbol of a Pegasus emblazoned on top of the flag of Italy. The Pegasus had long been associated with Tuscany, and with the Pegasus' connotations of peace and the triumph of good over evil, made it an obvious symbol for adoption by the CTLN.

== Legacy ==
The current flag of Tuscany features a Pegasus in recognition of the CTLN.

Numerous monuments, sculptures, and memorials have been built throughout Tuscany in recognition of the efforts and sacrifices made by the CTLN.

Tuscany celebrates 'Liberation Day' on 25 April every year to celebrate and remember the lives lost in the fight to free the region.
